= 2015 Harrisburg City Islanders season =

Harrisburg City Islanders
2015 season
- Owner: Eric Pettis
- Head coach: Bill Becher
- Stadium: Skyline Sports Complex
- USL: 8th place
- USL Playoffs: Did not qualify
- U.S. Open Cup: Third round
- Top goalscorer: League: Jason Plumhoff (10); All: Jason Plumhoff (10)
- Highest home attendance: 4,741 (August 29 vs FC Montreal)
- Lowest home attendance: League: 1,202 (September 12 vs. Richmond); All: 793 (May 27 vs. Rochester)
- Average home league attendance: League: 2,556; All: 2,430
Home colors	Away colors	Third colors

The 2015 season was the Harrisburg City Islanders's 12th season of competitive soccer–its twelfth season in the third division of American soccer and its fifth season in the United Soccer League since the league was first created with the City Islanders as one of the original ten founder-members.

== Anniversary Logo ==
Harrisburg City Islanders 12th Season

For the 2015 season, a new logo was developed to commemoration of the Islanders' 12th anniversary. According to the press release: "The design was developed to encompass the iconic Pennsylvania keystone; the Harrisburg Capitol building, which serves as the backdrop to the Skyline Sports Complex, and 12 stars, representing 12 seasons as a club and the 12th man on the field [the fans]." Club President, Tiago Lopes believes, “The 12th season of franchise history is a big milestone. This will be a season entirely dedicated to our fans. We wanted to do something to acknowledge and praise them for all the support. This season will be themed “11 and you,” acknowledging what it takes to accomplish wins and titles is the 12th element on the field; the importance of having the fans, partners and the community in support of our team.”

== Roster ==
No.	Position	Nation	Player
1	GK	USA	Nick Noble
4	MF	USA	Kyle McCord
5	DF	USA	Shane Johnson (on loan from Richmond Kickers)
6	MF	USA	Ken Tribbett
7	FW	CIV	Yann Ekra
8	MF	ESP	José Barril
9	FW	USA	Garret Pettis
10	MF	USA	Jason Plumhoff
11	MF	ESP	Enric Valles
12	FW	USA	Brett Jankouskas
13	GK	USA	Ciaran Nugent
14	MF	USA	Danny DiPrima
15	MF	USA	Tony Donatelli
16	MF	USA	Zach Pfeffer (on loan from Philadelphia Union)
17	FW	BIH	Dzenan Catic (on loan from Philadelphia Union)
18	MF	USA	Jimmy McLaughlin (on loan from Philadelphia Union)
19	MF	JAM	Cardel Benbow
20	DF	USA	Neil Shaffer
21	MF	BRA	Erick Neres da Cruz
22	MF	CMR	Eric Ayuk (on loan from Philadelphia Union)
22	FW	JAM	Craig Foster (on loan from Reno FC)
23	FW	FRA	Antoine Hoppenot (on loan from Philadelphia Union)
23	DF	USA	Raymond Lee (on loan from Philadelphia Union)
23	DF	USA	Eric Bird (on loan from Philadelphia Union)
27	GK	USA	Kyle Renfro
32	DF	JAM	Shaquille Dyer (on loan from Arnett Gardens FC)
63	DF	BER	Dante Leverock
77	FW	USA	Andrew Lubahn
—	DF	USA	Richie Marquez (on loan from Philadelphia Union)

Updated as of August 19, 2015. Roster listed here represents all players who are on the official roster and have made appearances for Harrisburg during the 2015 season.

== Transfers ==
=== In ===
Date	Player	Number	Position	Previous club	Fee/notes
March 17, 2015	(Brazil) Erick	21	MF	(Mexico) Irapuato FC	Undisclosed
March 17, 2015	(Jamaica) Cardel Benbow	19	MF	(Jamaica) Waterhouse FC	Undisclosed
March 23, 2015	(United States) Jason Plumhoff	10	MF	(United States) Reading United AC	Undisclosed
March 24, 2015	(United States) Ken Tribbett	6	MF	(United States) Ocean City Nor'easters	Undisclosed
August 3, 2015	(United States) Andrew Lubahn	77	F	(United States) Wake Forest Demon Deacons	Undisclosed
August 3, 2015	(United States) Kyle McCord	4	M	(United States) Virginia Cavaliers	Undisclosed
August 3, 2015	(United States) Tony Donatelli	15	M	(Canada) Ottawa Fury FC	Undisclosed

=== Out ===
Date	Player	Number	Position	New club	Fee/notes
December 4, 2014	(United States) Matt Bahner	16	DF	(United States) Jacksonville Armada	Undisclosed
February 6, 2015	(United States) Robbie Derschang	25	FW	(United States) Arizona United SC	Undisclosed
February 6, 2015	(United States) Brian Sylvestre	92	GK	(United States) Carolina Railhawks	Undisclosed
February 20, 2015	(United States) Jason Pelletier	22	MF		Retired
March 7, 2015	(Jamaica) Jamiel Hardware	5	FW	(United States) Saint Louis FC	Undisclosed
March 10, 2015	(United States) Morgan Langley	15	MF	(Republic of Ireland) St. Patrick's Athletic	Undisclosed
March 25, 2015	(United States) Raphael Cox	21	MF	(United States) Charlotte Independence	Undisclosed
April 2, 2015	(United States) Coady Andrews	4	DF		Released
	(Portugal) Edinho Júnior	11	FW	(Portugal) S.C. Farense	Undisclosed
	(United States) Colin Zizzi	6	MF		
	(United States) David Flynn	24	GK		

=== Loan in ===
Date	Player	Number	Position	Loaned from	Fee/notes
March 24, 2015	(United States) Shane Johnson	5	DF	(United States) Richmond Kickers	Loan for 2015 season
March 28, 2015	(United States) Jimmy McLaughlin	18	MF	(United States) Philadelphia Union	Temporary Loan
March 28, 2015	(United States) Zach Pfeffer	16	MF	(United States) Philadelphia Union	Temporary Loan
March 28, 2015	(Bosnia and Herzegovina) Dzenan Catic	17	FW	(United States) Philadelphia Union	Temporary Loan
April 4, 2015	(United States) Richie Marquez		DF	(United States) Philadelphia Union	Temporary Loan
April 18, 2015	(France) Antoine Hoppenot	23	FW	(United States) Philadelphia Union	Temporary Loan
May 9, 2015	(United States) Raymond Lee	23	DF	(United States) Philadelphia Union	Temporary Loan
May 27, 2015	(United States) Eric Bird	23	MF	(United States) Philadelphia Union	Temporary Loan
June 13, 2015	(Cameroon) Eric Ayuk	22	MF	(United States) Philadelphia Union	Temporary Loan
July 12, 2015	(Jamaica) Craig Foster	22	FW	(Jamaica) Reno FC	Loan through 2015 season
July 12, 2015	(Jamaica) Shaquille Dyer		FW	(Jamaica) Arnett Gardens FC	Loan through 2015 season

== Competitions ==
=== Preseason ===
March 8 Preseason 1	University of Maryland	Postponed	Harrisburg City Islanders	College Park, Maryland
11:00 a.m.				Stadium: Ludwig Field

March 11 Preseason 2	Saint Francis Red Flash	1 - 1	Harrisburg City Islanders	Millersville, Pennsylvania
8:30 p.m.				Stadium: Millersville University Stadium

March 13 Preseason 3	UMBC	0 - 6	Harrisburg City Islanders	Millersville, Pennsylvania
6:00 p.m.				Stadium: Millersville University Stadium

March 20 Preseason 4	Villanova Wildcats	Rescheduled	Harrisburg City Islanders	Villanova, Pennsylvania
4:00 p.m.				Stadium: Villanova West Campus Soccer Complex

March 22 Preseason 5	Georgetown Hoyas	0 - 1	Harrisburg City Islanders	College Park, Maryland
7:00 p.m.				Stadium: Ludwig Field

2015 Harrisburg City Islanders Schedule

=== USL ===
==== Standings (Eastern Conference) ====
Pos	Team	Pld	W	D	L	GF	GA	GD	Pts	Qualification
6	Richmond Kickers	28	10	11	7	41	35	+6	41	First round
7	Charlotte Independence	28	10	10	8	38	35	+3	40	
8	Harrisburg City Islanders	28	11	6	11	49	53	−4	39	
9	Saint Louis FC	28	8	9	11	30	40	−10	33	
10	FC Montreal	28	8	4	16	32	46	−14	28	

Source: 2015 USL schedule
Rules for classification: 1) head-to-head; 2) total wins; 3) total goal differential; 4) total goals scored; 5) disciplinary points; 6) away goals scored; 7) away goal differential; 8) home goals scored; 9) home goal differential; 10) coin toss or drawing of lots

==== Results ====
All times in Eastern Time.

March 28 1	Pittsburgh Riverhounds	5–2	Harrisburg City Islanders	Pittsburgh, Pennsylvania
19:00	Vincent 5'; Kerr 11', 52', 77'; Earls (yellow card) 40'; Arena (yellow card) 62'; Vincent 90'	Report; Box Score	Pfeffer 22'; Pettis 86'	Stadium: Highmark Stadium; Attendance: 2,244; Referee: Charles Murphy

April 4 2	Charleston Battery	2–0	Harrisburg City Islanders	Charleston, South Carolina
19:30	Cordoves 62'; Kelly 71'; Justin (yellow card) 78'	Box Score	Barril (yellow card) 70'	Stadium: Blackbaud Stadium; Attendance: 3,026; Referee: Howard Ash

April 18 3	Harrisburg City Islanders	2–1	FC Montreal	Harrisburg, Pennsylvania
19:00	McLaughlin 11' (pen.); Hoppenot 47'; Barril (yellow card) 72'	Report; Box Score	Bringolf (red card) 9'; Béland-Goyette 32'; Dinkota (yellow card) 40'; Temguia (yellow card) 89'	Stadium: Skyline Sports Complex; Attendance: 2,589; Referee: Matthew Kreitzer

April 24 4	Charlotte Independence	1–1	Harrisburg City Islanders	Charlotte, North Carolina
19:30	Finley 19'; Slogic (yellow card) 81'	Report; Box Score	Leverock 58'	Stadium: Transamerica Field; Attendance: 2,175; Referee: Richonne Clark

May 2 5	Wilmington Hammerheads FC	0–4	Harrisburg City Islanders	Wilmington, North Carolina
19:30	Anunga (yellow card) 68'	Report; Box Score	Tribbett 31', 70'; Jankouskas 59'; Plumhoff 89' (pen.)	Stadium: Legion Stadium; Attendance: 2,526; Referee: Mark Gorak

May 9 6	New York Red Bulls II	1–2	Harrisburg City Islanders	Harrison, New Jersey
14:00	Jean-Baptiste 9', (yellow card) 68'; Stolz (yellow card) 65' (yellow-red card) 86'	Report; Box Score	Barril 19' (pen.); Plewa 90' (o.g.)	Stadium: Red Bull Arena; Attendance: 380; Referee: Randall Kelley

May 16 7	Harrisburg City Islanders	2–0	Charlotte Independence	Harrisburg, Pennsylvania
19:00	Benbow 11'; Barril (yellow card) 26'; Tribbett 35'; Ekra (yellow card) 90'	Report; Box Score		Stadium: Skyline Sports Complex; Attendance: 2,178; Referee: Jaroslow Werel

May 30 8	Pittsburgh Riverhounds	6–5	Harrisburg City Islanders	Pittsburgh, Pennsylvania
19:00	Vincent 48', 90+'; Soumah 52', (yellow card) 90+'; Earls 81', 90'; Kerr 90+', (yellow card) 90+'	Report; Box Score	Ekra 28'; DiPrima 37'; Barril 38'; Plumhoff 56'; Pettis 86'	Stadium: Highmark Stadium; Attendance: 2,792; Referee: Jaroslow Werel

June 6 9	Harrisburg City Islanders	0 - 0	Toronto FC II	Harrisburg, Pennsylvania
19:00	Ekra (yellow card) 66'; Tribbett (yellow card) 72'	Report; Box Score	Aparicio (yellow card) 41'; Edwards (yellow card) 80'; Fraser (yellow card) 87'	Stadium: Skyline Sports Complex; Attendance: 2,640; Referee: Ryan Dusreis

June 13 10	Saint Louis FC	1 - 1	Harrisburg City Islanders	Fenton, Missouri
20:30	Fink 70'	Report; Box Score	Ayuk 38'; Johnson (yellow card) 73'; Shaffer (yellow card) 90'	Stadium: World Wide Technology Soccer Park; Attendance: 4,108; Referee: Cedric Adams

June 19 11	Harrisburg City Islanders	1 - 1	Rochester Rhinos	Harrisburg, Pennsylvania
19:30	Plumhoff 44'	Report; Box Score	Ringhof (yellow card) 56'; Volesky 87'	Stadium: Skyline Sports Complex; Attendance: 3,024; Referee: Mark Treilman

June 27 12	Charleston Battery	4 - 1	Harrisburg City Islanders	Charleston, South Carolina
19:30	Kelly 2', 62'; Mueller (yellow card) 31', (goal) 39' van Schaik (yellow card) 41'; Prince (yellow card) 41'; Garbanzo 75'; Griffith (red card) 85'	Report; Box Score	Barril (yellow card) 13'; Noble (yellow card) 40'; McLaughlin (yellow card) 43'; Jankouskas 89' (pen.)	Stadium: Blackbaud Stadium; Attendance: 4,523; Referee: Neil Barbulescu

July 4 13	Harrisburg City Islanders	1 - 0	Wilmington Hammerheads FC	Harrisburg, Pennsylvania
19:00	Leverock (yellow card) 18'; Valles (yellow card) 80'; Benbow 82'	Report; Box Score	Ackley (yellow card) 18'	Stadium: Skyline Sports Complex; Attendance: 2,281; Referee: Jaroslaw Werel

July 8 14	Harrisburg City Islanders	0 - 4	Charleston Battery	Harrisburg, Pennsylvania
19:00	Leverock (yellow card) 36'; Ekra (yellow card) 42'; Plumhoff (red card) 45'; Cruz (yellow card) 50'; Tribbett (yellow card) 72'	Report; Box Score	Kelly 3', 16'; Ferguson 37'; Garbanzo (yellow card) 45'; Woodbine 53'; Boyd 63'	Stadium: Skyline Sports Complex; Attendance: 2,643; Referee: Brandon Artis

July 12 15	New York Red Bulls II	0 - 2	Harrisburg City Islanders	New York City, New York
19:00	Metzger (yellow card) 72'; Bedoya (yellow card) 90'	Report; Box Score	Vallès (yellow card) 10', (goal) 86'; Cruz (yellow card) 15'; Foster 22'; Tribbett (yellow card) 81'; Hoppenot (yellow card) 90'	Stadium: Rocco B. Commisso Soccer Stadium; Attendance: 538

July 18 16	Harrisburg City Islanders	0 - 2	New York Red Bulls II	Harrisburg, Pennsylvania
19:00	Leverock (yellow card) 38' (yellow-red card) 65'	Report; Box Score	Thomas (yellow card) 41'; Stolz 75'; Bedoya 80'	Stadium: Skyline Sports Complex; Attendance: 2,177; Referee: Brandon Smith

July 26 17	Harrisburg City Islanders	4 - 3	Pittsburgh Riverhounds	Harrisburg, Pennsylvania
18:30	Plumhoff 43', 90', (yellow card) 44'; Barril (yellow card) 64' (yellow-red card) 65'; Foster 71', 79'	Report; Box Score	Amara 7'; Arena (yellow card) 10'; Vincent 22', (yellow card) 45'; O.G. 62'	Stadium: Skyline Sports Complex; Attendance: 2,022; Referee: Ryan Dos Reis

August 1 18	Richmond Kickers	4 - 2	Harrisburg City Islanders	Richmond, Virginia
19:00	Sekyere 15'; Yeisley 47', 90'; Davis 88'	Report; Box Score	Foster 25'; Leverock 69'; Ekra (yellow card) 79'	Stadium: City Stadium; Attendance: 5,580; Referee: Charles Carson

August 8 19	Harrisburg City Islanders	3 - 2	Richmond Kickers	Harrisburg, Pennsylvania
19:00	Tribbett (yellow card) 11'; Ekra 28', (yellow card) 76'; Jankouskas 56'; Leverock 61'; Bird (yellow card) 90'	Report; Box Score	Roberts (yellow card) 22'; Yeisley 66' (pen.), 87' (pen.), (yellow card) 90'	Stadium: Skyline Sports Complex; Attendance: 2,492; Referee: Charles Murphy

August 12 20	Harrisburg City Islanders	1 - 5	Louisville City FC	Harrisburg, Pennsylvania
19:00	Barril 56'	Report; Box Score	Fondy 2', 13', 44' (pen.), 74'; Dacres 22'	Stadium: Skyline Sports Complex; Attendance: 2,846; Referee: Mark Treilman

August 19 21	Toronto FC II	0 - 2	Harrisburg City Islanders	Woodbridge, Ontario
20:00	Jobe (yellow card) 45'; Mirabelli (yellow card) 66'	Report; Box Score	Foster 26'; Shaffer (yellow card) 35'; Jankouskas 50'; Noble 73'; Pettis (yellow card) 79'; Leverock (yellow card) 84'	Stadium: Ontario Soccer Centre; Attendance: 362; Referee: David Barrie

August 22 22	Rochester Rhinos	4 - 0	Harrisburg City Islanders	Rochester, New York
19:05	Walls 16' (pen.); Mendoza (yellow card) 19'; Dos Santos 67', 71'; Samuels 86'	Report; Box Score	Leverock (yellow card) 48'; Ekra (red card) 55'; Noble (yellow card) 60'	Stadium: Sahlen's Stadium; Attendance: 6,272; Referee: David Mon

August 29 23	Harrisburg City Islanders	6 - 0	FC Montreal	Lancaster, Pennsylvania
19:00	Valles 7'; Plumhoff 10', 45'; Foster 48', 54', 64'; Johnson (yellow card) 78'; Lubahn (yellow card) 81'	Report; Box Score	Haman (yellow card) 60'	Stadium: Clipper Magazine Stadium; Attendance: 4,741; Referee: Jaroslaw Werel

September 2 24	Louisville City FC	4 - 0	Harrisburg City Islanders	Louisville, Kentucky
19:30	Fondy 20', 22', 40'; Quinn (yellow card) 78'; Morad (yellow card) 84'; Ilic 90'	Report; Box Score	Ekra (yellow card) 36'; Dyer (yellow card) 89'	Stadium: Louisville Slugger Field; Attendance: 7,702; Referee: Hilario Grajeda

September 6 25	Harrisburg City Islanders	0 - 0	Saint Louis FC	Harrisburg, Pennsylvania
18:30	Ekra (yellow card) 4'; Shaffer (red card)	Report; Box Score	Gaul (yellow card) 13'; Roberts (red card)	Stadium: Skyline Sports Complex; Referee: Greg Dopka

September 12 26	Harrisburg City Islanders	1 - 1	Richmond Kickers	Harrisburg, Pennsylvania
19:00	Cruz (yellow card) 20'; Ekra (yellow card) 60'; Jankouskas 62'	Report; Box Score	Yomby (yellow card) 14'; Callahan (yellow card) 42'; Roberts (yellow card) 75'; Davis 90'	Stadium: Skyline Sports Complex; Attendance: 1,202; Referee: Darth Newman

September 16 27	FC Montreal	0 - 5	Harrisburg City Islanders	Montreal, Quebec
16:00	Bringolf (yellow card) 6'; Morelli (yellow card) 67'; Mkungilwa (yellow card) 74'	Report; Box Score	Plumhoff 9', 20', 90'; Hoppenot 47'; Lubahn 54'; Leverock (yellow card) 90'	Stadium: Saputo Stadium; Attendance: 141; Referee: Marie Beaudoin

September 19 28	Harrisburg City Islanders	1 - 2	Pittsburgh Riverhounds	Harrisburg, Pennsylvania
19:00	Barril (yellow card) 68'; Hoppenot 75'; Shaffer (yellow card) 89'	Report; Box Score	Moloto 34'; Kerr 35'; Arena (yellow card) 45'; Okiomah (yellow card) 89'; Brown (yellow card) 90'	Stadium: Skyline Sports Complex; Attendance: 2,388; Referee: Luis Guardia

2015 Harrisburg City Islanders Regular Season Schedule

==== Results summary ====
Overall								Home						Away					
Pld	Pts	W	L	T	GF	GA	GD	W	L	T	GF	GA	GD	W	L	T	GF	GA	GD
28	39	11	11	6	49	53	−4	6	4	4	22	21	+1	5	7	2	27	32	−5

Last updated: September 20, 2015
Source: 2015 USL season
Pld = Matches played; Pts = Points; W = Matches won; T = Matches tied; L = Matches lost; GF = Goals for; GA = Goals against; GD = Goal difference

Round	1	2	3	4	5	6	7	8	9	10	11	12	13	14	15	16	17	18	19	20	21	22	23	24	25	26	27	28
Stadium	A	A	H	A	A	A	H	A	H	A	H	A	H	H	A	H	H	A	H	H	A	A	H	A	H	H	A	H
Result	L	L	W	T	W	W	W	L	T	T	T	L	W	L	W	L	W	L	W	L	W	L	W	L	T	T	W	L

Updated to match(es) played on September 20, 2015. Source: 2015 USL season and Current USL Standing
A = Away; H = Home; W = Win; L = Loss; T = Tie

=== U.S. Open Cup ===
The City Islanders competed in the 2015 edition of the U.S. Open Cup. They were eliminated in the third round of competition after conceding three goals in extra time to the Rochester Rhinos.

May 20 Second round	Reading United A.C.	0–3	Harrisburg City Islanders	Reading, Pennsylvania
19:00 ET	Nygaard (yellow card) 24'; Smith (yellow card) 31'	Report	DiPrima 8'; Benbow 10'; Tribbett 46'; Shaffer (yellow card) 70' (yellow-red card) 76'	Stadium: Don Thomas Stadium; Attendance: 100; Referee: Darth Newman

May 27 Third round	Harrisburg City Islanders	1–3 (a.e.t.)	Rochester Rhinos	Harrisburg, Pennsylvania
19:00 ET	Jankouskas 106'	Report	Duba (red card) 38'; Forbes 108'; Samuels 15', 120'	Stadium: Skyline Sports Complex; Attendance: 793; Referee: Darth Newman

=== Friendlies ===
The 2015 annual friendly with the Philadelphia Union was the final friendly match of the two clubs MLS-USL affiliation. The match was held in Lancaster, Pennsylvania and drew a record crowd for an Islanders home match of 6,546 attendees.

August 31 Friendly	Harrisburg City Islanders	1-3	Philadelphia Union	Lancaster, Pennsylvania
7:00 PM	Pereira (yellow card) 33'; Jankouskas 44'; Donatelli (yellow card) 75'	Report	White 48'; Maidana 66'; Casey 75'	Stadium: Clipper Magazine Stadium; Attendance: 6,546; Referee: Ryan Dos Reis

== Statistics ==
As of September 20, 2015.

Players included in matchday squads
No.	Pos.	Nat.	Name	League		Playoffs		U.S. Open Cup		Total		Discipline	
No.	Pos.	Nat.	Name	Apps	Goals	Apps	Goals	Apps	Goals	Apps	Goals	A yellow rectangle, denoting the yellow penalty card shown to a player being cautioned	A red rectangle, denoting the red penalty card shown to a player being sent off
4	MF	(United States)	Kyle McCord	(4)	0	0	0	0	0	(4)	0	0	0
5	DF	(United States)	Shane Johnson	17(4)	0	0	0	0	0	17(4)	0	1	0
6	MF	(United States)	Ken Tribbett	28	3	0	0	2	1	30	4	7	0
7	FW	(Ivory Coast)	Yann Ekra	25	2	0	0	1(1)	0	26(1)	2	6	0
8	MF	(Spain)	José Barril	27	3	0	0	1(1)	0	28(1)	3	7	1
9	FW	(United States)	Garret Pettis	4(19)	2	0	0	2	0	6(19)	2	1	0
10	MF	(United States)	Jason Plumhoff	18(2)	10	0	0	2	0	20(2)	10	2	0
11	MF	(Spain)	Enric Valles	23(1)	2	0	0	2	0	25(1)	2	2	0
12	FW	(United States)	Brett Jankouskas	6(16)	5	0	0	1(1)	1	7(17)	6	1	0
14	MF	(United States)	Danny DiPrima	8(6)	1	0	0	2	1	10(6)	2	1	0
15	MF	(United States)	Tony Donatelli	3	0	0	0	0	0	3	0	0	0
16	MF	(United States)	Zach Pfeffer	3(1)	1	0	0	0	0	3(1)	1	0	0
17	FW	(Bosnia and Herzegovina)	Dzenan Catic†	3(4)	0	0	0	0	0	3(4)	0	0	0
18	MF	(United States)	Jimmy McLaughlin	7(2)	1	0	0	0	0	7(2)	1	1	0
19	MF	(Jamaica)	Cardel Benbow	11(8)	2	0	0	2	1	13(8)	3	0	0
20	DF	(United States)	Neil Shaffer	27	0	0	0	1	0	28	0	2	2
21	MF	(Brazil)	Erick Neres da Cruz	18(6)	0	0	0	2	0	20(6)	0	4	0
22	MF	(Cameroon)	Eric Ayuk	1	1	0	0	0	0	1	1	0	0
22	DF	(Jamaica)	Craig Foster*	13	8	0	0	0	0	13	8	0	0
23	FW	(France)	Antoine Hoppenot	4(7)	3	0	0	0	0	4(7)	3	1	0
23	DF	(United States)	Eric Bird	1(3)	0	0	0	(1)	0	1(4)	0	1	0
23	DF	(United States)	Raymond Lee	(1)	0	0	0	0	0	(1)	0	0	0
32	DF	(Jamaica)	Shaquille Dyer*	1(5)	0	0	0	0	0	1(5)	0	1	0
63	DF	(Bermuda)	Dante Leverock	20(2)	3	0	0	2	0	22(2)	3	6	1
77	FW	(United States)	Andrew Lubahn	7(1)	6	0	0	0	0	7(1)	1	1	0

Numbers in parentheses denote appearances as substitute.
Players with names struck through and marked † left the club during the playing season.
Players with names in italics were on loan from Philadelphia Union for individual matches with Harrisburg.
Players with names marked * were on loan from another club for the whole of their season with Harrisburg.
League denotes USL regular season
Playoffs denotes USL playoffs

=== Goalkeepers ===
As of September 20, 2015.

Players included in matchday squads
Nat.	No.	Player	Apps	Starts	Record	GA	GAA	SO	Booked	Sent off (straight red)
(United States)	1	Nick Noble	28	28	11–6–11	48	1.71	9	3	0
(United States)	13	Ciaran Nugent	0	0	0–0–0	0	0.00	0	0	0
(United States)	27	Kyle Renfro	(1)	0	0–0–0	1	1.00	0	0	0

== Honors ==
- Week 8 Team of the Week: M Enric Valles
  Honorable Mention: M José Barril
- Week 9 Team of the Week: D Dante Leverock
  Honorable Mention: D Ken Tribbett
- Week 14 Team of the Week: M Yann Ekra
- Week 16 Team of the Week: F Cardel Benbow
- Week 17 Team of the Week: M Enric Valles
- Week 19 Team of the Week: F Craig Foster and M Jason Plumhoff
- Week 21 Team of the Week: M Yann Ekra
- Week 23 Team of the Week: M Jose Barril and F Craig Foster
- Week 27 Team of the Week: M Jason Plumhoff
- USL Rookie of the Year Finalist: D Ken Tribbett
