= 2014 Harrisburg City Islanders season =

Harrisburg City Islanders
2014 season
- Owner: Eric Pettis
- Head coach: Bill Becher
- Stadium: Skyline Sports Complex
- USL Pro: 8th
- USL Pro Playoffs: Finals
- U.S. Open Cup: Fourth Round
- Top goalscorer: Morgan Langley (6); Jimmy McLaughlin (6); Robbie Derschang (6)
- Highest home attendance: 2,518 (July 18 vs. Wilmington)
- Lowest home attendance: 1,417 (May 17 vs. Dayton)
- Average home league attendance: 1,949
Home colors	Away colors	Third colors

The 2014 season was the Harrisburg City Islanders's 11th season of competitive soccer - its eleventh season in the third division of American soccer and its fourth season in USL Pro since the league was first created with the City Islanders as one of the original 10 founder-members.

== Roster ==
No.	Position	Nation	Player
1	GK	USA	Nick Noble
2	DF	USA	Richie Marquez (on loan from Philadelphia Union)
4	DF	USA	Coady Andrews
5	FW	JAM	Jamiel Hardware
6	MF	USA	Colin Zizzi
7	FW	FRA	Yann Ekra
8	MF	ESP	José Barril
9	FW	USA	Garret Pettis
10	FW	MOZ	Clésio Baúque (on loan from Benfica)
11	FW	POR	Edinho Júnior
14	MF	USA	Danny DiPrima
15	MF	USA	Morgan Langley
16	FW	USA	Matt Bahner
18	MF	USA	Jimmy McLaughlin (on loan from Philadelphia Union)
20	MF	USA	Neil Shaffer
21	MF	USA	Raphael Cox
22	MF	USA	Jason Pelletier
23	FW	MEX	Cristhian Hernández (on loan from Philadelphia Union)
24	GK	USA	David Flynn
25	DF	USA	Robbie Derschang
30	MF	BRA	Pedro Ribeiro (on loan from Philadelphia Union)
92	GK	USA	Brian Sylvestre
93	MF	BRA	Luan Silva (on loan from Corinthians)

== Transfers ==
=== In ===
Date	Player	Number	Position	Previous club	Fee/notes
January 24, 2014	(Portugal) Edinho Júnior	11	FW	(England) Blackburn Rovers	Free transfer
March 25, 2014	(United States) Raphael Cox	21	MF	(United States) Tampa Bay Rowdies	Undisclosed
March 27, 2014	(United States) Danny DiPrima	14	MF	(United States) North Carolina State University	Homegrown
April 3, 2015	(United States) Neil Shaffer	20	MF	(United States) Pittsburgh Riverhounds	Free

=== Out ===
Date	Player	Number	Position	New club	Fee/notes
	(Mozambique) Lucky Mkosana		FW	(United States) Tampa Bay Rowdies	Undisclosed
	(United States) Stephen Basso		DF	(United States) Richmond Kickers	Undisclosed
	(Trinidad and Tobago) Damani Richards		DF	(United States) Philadelphia Union	Undisclosed
	(The Gambia) Sainey Touray		DF	(United States) San Antonio Scorpions	Undisclosed

=== Loan in ===
Date	Player	Number	Position	Loaned from	Fee/notes
March 17, 2014	(Mozambique) Clésio	10	FW	(Portugal) S.L. Benfica	Season-long loan
March 21, 2014	(Mexico) Cristhian Hernandez	10	FW	(United States) Philadelphia Union	Season-long loan
March 21, 2014	(United States) Jimmy McLaughlin	18	MF	(United States) Philadelphia Union	Season-long loan
March 27, 2014	(Brazil) Pedro Ribeiro	30	MF	(United States) Philadelphia Union	Season-long loan
March 27, 2014	(United States) Richie Marquez	2	DF	(United States) Philadelphia Union	Season-long loan
June 11, 2014	(United States) Shane Johnson	26	DF	(United States) Richmond Kickers	Remainder of 2014 season

== Competitions ==
=== Preseason ===
March 7 Preseason 1	Harrisburg City Islanders	Cancelled	UMBC Retrievers	Millersville, Pennsylvania
6:00 p.m.				Stadium: Millersville University Stadium

March 19 Preseason 2	Harrisburg City Islanders	Cancelled	Saint Francis Red Flash	Millersville, Pennsylvania
8:00 p.m.				Stadium: Millersville University Stadium

March 22 Preseason 3	Penn State Nittany Lions	1 - 3	Harrisburg City Islanders	State College, Pennsylvania
4:00 p.m.	Goal		Goal	Stadium: Jeffrey Field

March 22 Preseason 4	Harrisburg City Islanders	1 - 1	Navy Midshipmen	Mechanicsburg, Pennsylvania
4:00 p.m.	Goal		Goal	Stadium: Cumberland Valley High School

March 30 Preseason 5	Maryland Terrapins	Cancelled	Harrisburg City Islanders	College Park, Maryland
5:00 p.m.				Stadium: Ludwig Field

=== USL Pro ===
==== Standings ====
Pos	Team	Pld	W	T	L	GF	GA	GD	Pts	Qualification
6	Rochester Rhinos (A)	28	10	8	10	29	25	+4	38	Playoffs
7	Wilmington Hammerheads (A)	28	9	11	8	35	33	+2	38	Playoffs
8	Harrisburg City Islanders (A)	28	10	7	11	45	46	−1	37	Playoffs
9	Arizona United SC	28	10	5	13	32	47	−15	33 (Note: Arizona was deducted two points for fielding an ineligible player on June 21 against LA Galaxy II.)	
10	Oklahoma City Energy FC	28	9	5	14	32	37	−5	32	

Source: USL Pro official standings
Rules for classification: 1) points; 2) goal difference; 3) number of goals scored.
(A) Advances to USL Pro Playoffs

==== Results ====
All times in Eastern Time.

April 5 1	Wilmington Hammerheads	0–0	Harrisburg City Islanders	Wilmington, North Carolina
19:30	Arnoux (yellow card) 78'; Parratt (yellow card) 82'; Fairclough (yellow card) 90'	Report	Hernández (yellow card) 60'; Langley (yellow card) 75'	Stadium: Legion Stadium; Attendance: 3,256; Referee: Matthew Jozaitis

April 19 2	Harrisburg City Islanders	0–1	Dayton Dutch Lions	Harrisburg, Pennsylvania
19:00	Noble (yellow card) 40'	Report	Thurière (yellow card) 25'; Schoenfeld 41'; Harada (yellow card) 45'	Stadium: Skyline Sports Complex; Attendance: 1,711; Referee: Dimitar Chavdarov

April 24 3	Orange County Blues	4–1	Harrisburg City Islanders	Irvine, California
22:30	Santana 6', 25'; Moses (yellow card) 17'; Cortez 74', 87'	Report	Hernández (yellow card) 31' (goal) 44'	Stadium: Anteater Stadium; Attendance: 616; Referee: Chris Calderon

April 26 4	Sacramento Republic	1–2	Harrisburg City Islanders	Sacramento, California
22:30	Jahn 32'; Alvarez (yellow card) 58'	Report	Derschang 5'; Langley (yellow card) 25' (goal) 52'; Bahner (yellow card) 42'	Stadium: Hughes Stadium; Attendance: 20,231; Referee: Alex Del Angel

May 2 5	Harrisburg City Islanders	0–4	Charleston Battery	Harrisburg, Pennsylvania
22:30	Langley (yellow card) 15'; Ekra (yellow card) 28'; White (red card) 66'	Report	Sanyang (yellow card) 20'; Salgado 25'; Prince 41'; Lewis 65'; Diouf (yellow card) 66 ' (goal) 90'	Stadium: Skyline Sports Complex; Attendance: 1,446; Referee: Jose Carlos Rivero

May 10 6	Harrisburg City Islanders	0–1	Arizona United SC	Harrisburg, Pennsylvania
22:30	Ekra (yellow card) 32'; Zizzi (yellow card) 63'	Report	Swartzendruber 19' (pen.); Kassel (yellow card) 69'	Stadium: Skyline Sports Complex; Attendance: 1,657; Referee: Alex Chilowicz

May 17 7	Harrisburg City Islanders	5–3	Dayton Dutch Lions	Harrisburg, Pennsylvania
22:30	Baúque 19', 23'; Shaffer 47'; Langley (yellow card) 43' (goal) 83', 90'	Report	Schoenfeld 1', 69'; Garner 65'; Khutsidze (yellow card) 73'	Stadium: Skyline Sports Complex; Attendance: 1,417; Referee: Neil Barbulescu

May 31 8	Harrisburg City Islanders	2 - 3	Richmond Kickers	Harrisburg, Pennsylvania
22:30	Cox (yellow card) 32'; McLaughlin (yellow card) 52'; Langley 55'; Silva (yellow card) 56'; O.G. 90'	Box Score	Jefery 6'; Delicate 62'; Porter 90'	Stadium: Skyline Sports Complex; Attendance: 2,233

June 1 9	Pittsburgh Riverhounds	1 - 1	Harrisburg City Islanders	Pittsburgh, Pennsylvania
22:30	Fekete 12'; Collins (yellow card) 40'; Angulo (yellow card) 43'; Kerr (yellow card) 78'	Box Score	Langley (yellow card) 19'; Ekra (yellow card) 42'; McLaughlin 85'	Stadium: Highmark Stadium; Attendance: 2,756

June 7 10	Richmond Kickers	1 - 0	Harrisburg City Islanders	Richmond, Virginia
22:30	Delicate 9'	Box Score	Barril (yellow card) 31'; Hernandez (yellow card) 82'	Stadium: City Stadium; Attendance: 2,333

June 11 11	Pittsburgh Riverhounds	1 - 3	Harrisburg City Islanders	Richmond, Virginia
22:30	John 6'; Angulo (yellow card) 90'	Box Score	McLaughlin 48'; Bauque 63'; Ekra 86'	Stadium: Highmark Stadium; Attendance: 2,005

June 14 12	Harrisburg City Islanders	0 - 0	Pittsburgh Riverhounds	Harrisburg, Pennsylvania
22:30	Zizzi (yellow card) 73'	Box Score	Vincent (yellow card) 53'; Ngwenya (yellow card) 85'	Stadium: Skyline Sports Complex; Attendance: 1,780

June 14 13	Montreal Impact Reserves	1 - 0	Harrisburg City Islanders	Montreal, Quebec
16:00	O.G. (yellow card) 73'	Box Score	Barril (yellow card) 62'	Stadium: Stade Saputo

June 27 14	Harrisburg City Islanders	1 - 0	Charlotte Eagles	Harrisburg, Pennsylvania
16:00	Andrews 90'	Box Score	Sekyere 57'	Stadium: Skyline Sports Complex; Attendance: 1,835

July 5 15	Harrisburg City Islanders	4 - 1	Charleston Battery	Harrisburg, Pennsylvania
16:00	McLaughlin 7'; Barril 11'; Langley 21' (yellow card) 55'; Hardware (yellow card) 45'; Bahner 48'; Noble (yellow card) 51'; Ribeiro (yellow card) 79'	Box Score	Kelly (yellow card) 39'; Sanyang (yellow card) 49' vanSchaik (yellow card) 52' (goal) 86'; Lewis (red card)	Stadium: Skyline Sports Complex; Attendance: 2,033

July 12 16	Dayton Dutch Lions	1 - 3	Harrisburg City Islanders	Dayton, Ohio
16:00	Pettis 4'; McLaughlin 35'; Derschang 90'	Box Score	Vickers (yellow card) 51'; Granger (yellow card) 83'; Garner (yellow card) 90'	Stadium: DOC Stadium; Attendance: 334

July 18 17	Harrisburg City Islanders	0 - 0	Wilmington Hammerheads	Harrisburg, Pennsylvania
16:00	Ekra (yellow card) 19'; Barril (yellow card) 57'; Bahner (yellow card) 85'	Box Score	Ochoa (yellow card) 19'; Cole (yellow card) 54'; Musa (yellow card) 62'; Hamilton (yellow card) 84'	Stadium: Skyline Sports Complex; Attendance: 2,518

July 23 18	Harrisburg City Islanders	3 - 3	OKC Energy FC	Harrisburg, Pennsylvania
16:00	Bahner 18'; Ribeiro 23', 84' (yellow card) 90'; Langley (yellow card) 62'; Bauque (yellow card) 78'; Derschang (yellow card) 87'	Box Score	Delgado 37'; Greig 38', 44'; Perry (yellow card) 52'	Stadium: Skyline Sports Complex; Attendance: 2,312

July 26 19	Richmond Kickers	2 - 1	Harrisburg City Islanders	Richmond, Virginia
16:00	Vercollone 5', pen.' Kalungi (yellow card) 13'; Goerres 23'; Arbelaez (yellow card) 81'	Box Score	Bahner (yellow card) 62'; Andrews 88'	Stadium: City Stadium; Attendance: 2,788

July 30 20	Harrisburg City Islanders	3 - 1	LA Galaxy II	Harrisburg, Pennsylvania
16:00	Hardware 17'; McLaughlin 54'; Derschang 86'	Box Score	Garcia 40'; Mendiola (yellow card) 76'	Stadium: Skyline Sports Complex; Attendance: 1,833

August 2 21	Dayton Dutch Lions	0 - 1	Harrisburg City Islanders	Dayton, Ohio
16:00	Clemens (yellow card) 56'; Thuriere (yellow card) 68'	Box Score	Pettis 8'; DiPrima (yellow card) 74'; Cox (yellow card) 88'; Noble (yellow card) 89'	Stadium: DOC Stadium; Attendance: 396

August 6 22	Harrisburg City Islanders	3 - 1	New York Red Bulls Reserves	Harrisburg, Pennsylvania
16:00	Ribeiro 33', 52'; Hardware 56'	Box Score	O.G. 65'	Stadium: Skyline Sports Complex; Attendance: 2,206

August 9 23	Harrisburg City Islanders	3 - 2	Orlando City	Harrisburg, Pennsylvania
16:00	Derschang 21', 30'; Langley (yellow card) 45'; Ekra (yellow card) 49' (goal) 53'; Noble (yellow card) 83'	Box Score	da Luz (yellow card) 49'; Molino 81'; Gentile 87'	Stadium: Skyline Sports Complex; Attendance: 2,051

August 16 24	Orlando City	3 - 1	Harrisburg City Islanders	Harrisburg, Pennsylvania
16:00	Derschang 6'; Cox (yellow card) 66'	Box Score	Ceren 8', 89'; Molino 19'; Rusin (yellow card) 41'; Heath (yellow card) 43'; Turner (yellow card) 83'	Stadium: Skyline Sports Complex; Attendance: 5,029

August 23 25	Rochester Rhinos	2 - 2	Harrisburg City Islanders	Rochester, New York
16:00	Walls 8'; Diallo (yellow card) 20'; Banks 54' (pen.); McMahon (yellow card) 87'	Box Score	Noble (red card); Bauque 37', 42'; Andrews (yellow card) 56'; Flynn (yellow card) 90'	Stadium: Sahlen's Stadium; Attendance: 4,388

August 30 26	Harrisburg City Islanders	1 - 4	Rochester Rhinos	Harrisburg, Pennsylvania
16:00	Langley 23'; Derschang (yellow card) 24'; Andrews (yellow card) 48'; Hoppenot (yellow card) 51'; Cox (yellow card) 55'	Box Score	O.G. 1'; Obasi (yellow card) 16'; Mendoza (yellow card) 38'; Sundly 48'; Banks 66'; Diallo 84'	Stadium: Skyline Sports Complex; Attendance: 2,257

September 5 27	Charleston Battery	2 - 1	Harrisburg City Islanders	Charleston, South Carolina
16:00	Cordoves (yellow card) 45'; Cuevas 45'; Diouf 56'; Prince (yellow card) 58'	Box Score	Marquez (yellow card) 28'; Barril (yellow card) 89'; Pettis 89'; Wheeler (yellow card) 90'	Stadium: Blackbaud Stadium; Attendance: 3,919

September 6 28	Charlotte Eagles	2 - 4	Harrisburg City Islanders	Charlotte, North Carolina
16:00	Thompson 9'; Kann (red card); Newnam (yellow card) 24'; Dixon (red card) 44'; Herrera 71'	Box Score	McLaughlin 14'; Hardware (yellow card) 25' (goal) 48'; Jose Barril 39'; Ekra (yellow card) 58'; Shaffer (yellow card) 77'	Stadium: Dickson Field; Attendance: 627

==== Results summary ====
Overall								Home						Away					
Pld	Pts	W	L	T	GF	GA	GD	W	L	T	GF	GA	GD	W	L	T	GF	GA	GD
28	37	10	11	7	45	46	−1	5	5	4	25	25	0	5	6	3	20	21	−1

Last updated: August 22, 2015
Source: 2014 USL Pro season
Pld = Matches played; Pts = Points; W = Matches won; T = Matches tied; L = Matches lost; GF = Goals for; GA = Goals against; GD = Goal difference

Round	1	2	3	4	5	6	7	8	9	10	11	12	13	14	15	16	17	18	19	20	21	22	23	24	25	26	27	28
Stadium	A	H	A	A	H	H	H	H	A	A	A	H	A	H	H	A	H	H	A	H	A	H	H	A	A	H	A	A
Result	T	L	L	W	L	L	W	L	T	L	W	T	L	T	W	W	T	T	L	W	W	W	W	L	T	L	L	W

Source: 2014 USL Pro season and Game Results
A = Away; H = Home; W = Win; L = Loss; T = Tie

==== Playoffs ====
The Islanders finished 8th place at the end of the regular season earning the last playoff seed. The seeding would require the Islanders to play any post-season matches on the road. Despite being considered the underdog of the playoffs, the Islanders advanced past Commissioner's Cup winners, Orlando City SC in the quarterfinals, 4th-seeded Richmond Kickers in the semifinals, ultimately losing to Sacramento Republic in the 2014 Championship final.

September 13 Quarterfinals	Orlando City	0–1	Harrisburg City Islanders	Lake Buena Vista, Florida
19:30	Valentino (yellow card) 24'; Pulis (yellow card) 89'	Box Score	Hoppenot 40', (yellow card) 65'; Barril (yellow card) 79'; Derschang (red card) 90+'	Stadium: ESPN Sports Complex; Attendance: 4,855; Referee: Matthew Miscannon

September 20 Semifinals	Richmond Kickers	2–3	Harrisburg City Islanders	Richmond, Virginia
19:00	Yeisley 32'; Shanosky 79'; Spitz (yellow card) 90+'	Box Score	Langley 27' (yellow card) 89'; Hardware 45'; Barril (yellow card) 64'; Bahner (yellow card) 71'; DiPrima 76'	Stadium: City Stadium; Attendance: 3,734; Referee: Mark Gorak

September 27 Final	Sacramento Republic	2–0	Harrisburg City Islanders	Sacramento, California
22:30	Guzman 36'; Evans (yellow card) 90'; Stewart 90+'	Report; Report; Report; Report	Langley (yellow card) 46'	Stadium: Bonney Field; Attendance: 8,000; Referee: Ricardo Salazar

=== U.S. Open Cup ===
The Islanders entered the 2014 U.S. Open Cup in the second round against USL PDL club FC Sonic Lehigh Valley. Advancing through to the fourth round, the Islanders were knocked out of the tournament by their MLS affiliate Philadelphia Union in a close match where Philadelphia captain, Maurice Edu slotted an 89th-minute equalizer, bringing the match to extra time. Through extra time, Pennsylvania native, Andrew Wenger, struck twice advancing the Union with a score 3–1.

May 14 Second round	FC Sonic Lehigh Valley	0–4	Harrisburg City Islanders	Whitehall, Pennsylvania
19:05 ET		Report	Barrill 48'; Pettis 82'; Baúque 90+1'; DiPrima 90+3'	Stadium: Whitehall H.S. Soccer Stadium

May 28 Third round	Baltimore Bohemians	2 - 4	Harrisburg City Islanders	Towson, Maryland
17:30 ET	Onwuka 76', 87'; Shinsky (red card) 90'	Report	Langley 8', 80'; McLaughlin 31', 37'	Stadium: Calvert Hall Stadium

June 17 Fourth round	Philadelphia Union	3–1 (a.e.t.)	Harrisburg City Islanders	Chester, Pennsylvania
19:00 ET	Gaddis (yellow card) 79'; Edu 89', (yellow card) 108'; Wenger 110', 117'; Hoppenot (yellow card) 112'	Report; Box Score	Langley (yellow card) 32'; Pelletier 38'; Júnior (yellow card) 94'	Stadium: PPL Park

== Statistics ==
Players included in matchday squads
No.	Pos.	Nat.	Name	League		Playoffs		U.S. Open Cup		Total		Discipline	
No.	Pos.	Nat.	Name	Apps	Goals	Apps	Goals	Apps	Goals	Apps	Goals	A yellow rectangle, denoting the yellow penalty card shown to a player being cautioned	A red rectangle, denoting the red penalty card shown to a player being sent off
00	DF	(United States)	Andrew Ribeiro	1	0	0	0	0	0	1	0	0	0
2	DF	(United States)	Richie Marquez *	28	0	3	0	0	0	31	0	1	0
4	DF	(United States)	Coady Andrews	14(3)	2	3	0	0	0	17(3)	2	2	0
5	FW	(Jamaica)	Jamiel Hardware	8(16)	3	3	1	0	0	11(16)	4	2	0
6	MF	(United States)	Colin Zizzi	8(14)	0	(1)	0	0	0	8(15)	0	2	0
7	FW	(France)	Yann Ekra	24(3)	1	3	0	0	0	27(3)	1	6	0
8	MF	(Spain)	José Barril	20(1)	2	3	0	0	0	23(1)	2	5	0
9	FW	(United States)	Garret Pettis	8(19)	3	(2)	0	0	0	8(21)	3	0	0
10	FW	(Mozambique)	Clésio Baúque *	9(11)	5	0	0	0	0	9(11)	5	1	0
11	FW	(Portugal)	Edinho Júnior	3(4)	0	0	0	0	0	3(4)	0	0	0
12	MF	(Brazil)	Leonardo Fernandes	1(2)	0	0	0	0	0	1(2)	0	0	0
14	MF	(United States)	Danny DiPrima	3(17)	0	(2)	1	0	0	3(19)	1	1	0
15	MF	(United States)	Morgan Langley	24(1)	6	2(1)	1	0	0	26(2)	7	7	0
17	FW	(United States)	Matt Bahner	28	2	3	0	0	0	31	2	3	0
18	MF	(United States)	Jimmy McLaughlin *	14(9)	6	3	0	0	0	17(9)	6	1	0
19	MF	(United States)	Zach Pfeffer *	1	0	0	0	0	0	1	0	0	0
20	MF	(United States)	Neil Shaffer	13(9)	1	3	0	0	0	16(9)	1	1	0
21	MF	(United States)	Raphael Cox	19(4)	0	0	0	0	0	19(4)	0	4	0
22	MF	(United States)	Jason Pelletier	11(11)	0	0	0	0	0	11(11)	0	0	0
23	FW	(Mexico)	Cristhian Hernández *	6(12)	1	(1)	0	0	0	6(13)	1	2	0
25	MF	(United States)	Robbie Derschang	6(12)	1	(1)	0	0	0	6(13)	1	2	0
26	DF	(United States)	Shane Johnson	2	0	0	0	0	0	2	0	0	0
27	MF	(France)	Antoine Hoppenot *	7(2)	1	3	1	0	0	10(2)	2	1	0
30	MF	(Brazil)	Pedro Ribeiro *	12	4	0	0	0	0	12	4	2	0
33	FW	(United States)	Aaron Wheeler	3	0	1	0	0	0	3	1	1	0
44	DF	(United States)	Ethan White	1	0	0	0	0	0	1	0	0	1
93	MF	(Brazil)	Luan Silva *	2(8)	0	0	0	0	0	2(8)	0	1	0

Numbers in parentheses denote appearances as substitute.
Players with names struck through and marked † left the club during the playing season.
Players with names in italics and marked * were on loan from another club for the whole of their season with Harrisburg.
Players listed with no appearances have been in the matchday squad but only as unused substitutes.
League denotes USL Pro regular season
Playoffs denotes USL Pro playoffs

=== Goalkeepers ===
Referenced from USL 2014 Statistics

Players included in matchday squads
Nat.	No.	Player	Apps	Starts	Record	GA	GAA	SO	Booked	Sent off (straight red)
(United States)	1	Nick Noble	27	1	10–9–6	39	1.58	3	4	1
(United States)	92	Brian Sylvestre	3	0	0–2–0	5	1.91	0	0	0
(United States)	24	David Flynn	2	0	0–0–1	2	2.65	0	1	0

== Honors ==
- Week 3 Team of the Week: F Jason Pelletier
  Honorable Mention: M Pedro Ribeiro and M Clesio Bauque
- Week 5 Team of the Week: M Pedro Ribeiro
  Honorable Mention: D Richie Marquez
- Week 9 Player of the Week: M Morgan Langley
  Week 9 Team of the Week: M Morgan Langley and M Clesio Bauque
  Honorable Mention: D Neil Shaffer and F Matt Bahner
- Week 11 Team of the Week: M Jimmy McLaughlin
  Honorable Mention: M Morgan Langley and M Luan Silva
- Week 12 Team of the Week - Honorable Mention: M Pedro Ribeiro and D Richie Marquez
- Week 14 Team of the Week - Honorable Mention: M Cristhian Hernandez and M Jimmy McLaughlin
- Week 15 Team of the Week: D Coady Andrews
  Honorable Mention: M Danny DiPrima
- Week 16 Team of the Week: D Matt Bahner, M Jose Barril, M Jimmy McLaughlin
  Honorable Mention: M Morgan Langley and D Richie Marquez
- Week 17 Team of the Week: M Jimmy McLaughlin
  Honorable Mention: M Yann Ekra and M Garret Pettis
- Week 19 Team of the Week: D Matt Bahner and M Pedro Ribeiro
  Honorable Mention: M Yann Ekra and M Robbie Derschang
- Week 20 Team of the Week: GK Nick Noble and M Yann Ekra
  Honorable Mention: M Jimmy McLaughlin and M Garret Pettis
- Week 21 Player of the Week: F Pedro Ribeiro
  Week 21 Team of the Week: M Pedro Ribeiro, M Yann Ekra, and M Robbie Derschang
  Honorable Mention: D Richie Marquez and F Antoine Hoppenot
- Week 22 Team of the Week - Honorable Mention: M Robbie Derschang and M Leonardo Fernandes
- Week 23 Team of the Week: F Clesio Bauque
  Honorable Mention: GK David Flynn and M Yann Ekra
- USL Pro All-League Second Team: D Matt Bahner
