= 2013 Harrisburg City Islanders season =

Harrisburg City Islanders 2013 football season

Harrisburg City Islanders
2013 season
- Owner: Eric Pettis
- Head coach: Bill Becher
- Stadium: Skyline Sports Complex
- USL Pro: 4th
- USL Pro Playoffs: Quarterfinal
- U.S. Open Cup: Second round
- Top goalscorer: Lucky Mkosana (13)
Home colors	Away colors	Third colors

The 2013 season was the Harrisburg City Islanders's 10th season of competitive soccer - its tenth season in the third division of American soccer and its third season in USL Pro since the league was first created with the City Islanders as one of the original 10 founder-members.

== Season overview ==
Tenth anniversary logo

In the end of season all-league teams, three players from the Islanders made the selections. Sainey Touray was the sole member from Harrisburg to make the first team, while goalkeeper Nick Noble and Lucky Mkosana - HCI's top scorer - were picked for the second team.

== Roster ==
No.	Position	Nation	Player
1	GK	USA	Nick Noble
2	MF	USA	Greg Jordan
4	DF	USA	Coady Andrews
5	MF	JAM	Jamiel Hardware
6	MF	USA	Colin Zizzi
7	DF	TTO	Damani Richards
7	MF	FRA	Yann Ekra
9	FW	USA	Garret Pettis
10	MF	BRA	Leo Fernandes (on loan from Philadelphia Union)
10	MF	ITA	Antonio Bau
13	DF	USA	Stephen Basso
11	DF	USA	Tom Brandt
12	MF	USA	Andrew Welker
14	MF	ENG	Tom Mellor
15	MF	USA	Morgan Langley
16	DF	USA	Matt Bahner
17	FW	ZIM	Lucky Mkosana
18	MF	USA	Jimmy McLaughlin (on loan from Philadelphia Union)
19	FW	USA	Don Anding (on loan from Philadelphia Union)
20	FW	GAM	Sainey Touray
21	DF	USA	Andrew Ribeiro
22	MF	USA	Jason Pelletier
23	FW	MEX	Cristhian Hernández (on loan from Philadelphia Union)
25	FW	USA	Aaron Wheeler (on loan from Philadelphia Union)
26	MF	CAN	Kenny Caceros
92	GK	USA	Brian Sylvestre

== Transfers ==
=== In ===
Date	Player	Number	Position	Previous club	Fee/notes
March 25, 2013	(Mexico) Cristhian Hernandez		FW	(United States) Philadelphia Union	Loan
March 25, 2013	(United States) Greg Jordan		MF	(United States) Philadelphia Union	Loan
March 25, 2013	(United States) Jimmy McLaughlin		MF	(United States) Philadelphia Union	Loan
April 10, 2013	(United States) Don Anding		FW	(United States) Philadelphia Union	Loan
April 10, 2013	(United States) Coady Andrews		DF	(United States) Missouri Comets	Free
April 10, 2013	(United States) Matt Bahner		DF	(United States) Cincinnati Bearcats	Free
April 10, 2013	(Jamaica) Jamiel Hardware		MF	(Sweden) Motala AIF	Free
April 10, 2013	(Trinidad and Tobago) Damani Richards		DF	(United States) Philadelphia Union	Free
April 18, 2013	(United States) Andrew Ribeiro		DF	(United States) Portland Timbers U23s	Free
May 3, 2013	(Brazil) Leo Fernandes		MF	(United States) Philadelphia Union	Free

=== Out ===
Date	Player	Number	Position	Previous club	Fee/notes
February 15, 2013	(United States) Drew Yates		MF	(United States) Charlotte Eagles	Free
March 6, 2013	(United States) Andrew Marshall		DF	(United States) Pittsburgh Riverhounds	Free
March 21, 2013	(United States) J. T. Noone		MF	(United States) VSI Tampa Bay	Free

== Competitions ==
=== USL Pro ===
==== League table ====
Pos	Team	Pld	W	T	L	GF	GA	GD	Pts	Qualification
2	Orlando City (A)	26	16	6	4	54	26	+28	54	Playoffs
3	Charleston Battery (A)	26	13	6	7	48	29	+19	45	Playoffs
4	Harrisburg City Islanders (A)	26	14	2	10	55	39	+16	44	Playoffs
5	Charlotte Eagles (A)	26	10	11	5	44	39	+5	41	Playoffs
6	Los Angeles Blues (A)	26	11	7	8	52	37	+15	40	Playoffs

Source: USL Pro official standings
Rules for classification: 1) points; 2) goal difference; 3) number of goals scored.
(A) Advances to USL Pro Playoffs

==== Results ====
All times in Eastern Time.

April 13 1	Pittsburgh Riverhounds	1–2	Harrisburg City Islanders	Pittsburgh, Pennsylvania
20:00	Kerr (yellow card) 61'; Angulo 70'	Box Score	Langley (yellow card) 70'; Touray 77'; Mkosana 90'	Stadium: Highmark Stadium; Referee: Kevin Terry

April 20 2	Colorado Rapids Reserves	1–2	Harrisburg City Islanders	Commerce City, Colorado
21:00	Serna 55' (yellow card) 55'	Box Score	Hernández 2'; Zizzi (yellow card) 62'; Jordan 64'	Stadium: Dick's Sporting Goods Park

April 27 3	Harrisburg City Islanders	5–1	Rochester Rhinos	Harrisburg, Pennsylvania
19:00	McLaughlin 30'; Ekra 66'; Mkosana 66', 90+2'; Mellor (yellow card) 78'; Touray 80'	Box Score	Brettschneider (red card); Duckett 62'	Stadium: Skyline Sports Complex; Referee: Neil Barbulescu

May 1 4	Harrisburg City Islanders	1–2	Charleston Battery	Harrisburg, Pennsylvania
19:00	Hernández 41'; Langley (yellow card) 45'; Jordan (yellow card) 67'	Box Score	Azira 9' (yellow card) 79'; Wiltse (yellow card) 29'; Paterson 37' (pen.)	Stadium: Skyline Sports Complex; Referee: Benjamin Larason

May 4 5	Rochester Rhinos	0–1	Harrisburg City Islanders	Rochester, New York
19:05	LaBauex (yellow card) 36'; Kyriasiz (yellow card) 54'; Polak (yellow card) 71'; Rosenlund (yellow card) 76'; McFayden (yellow card) 82'	Box Score]	Pelletier (yellow card) 30'; Langley 37'; Fernandes (yellow card) 72'	Stadium: Rhinos Stadium; Referee: Neil Barbulescu

May 10 6	Harrisburg City Islanders	4–0	Antigua Barracuda FC	Richmond, Virginia
20:00	Langley 1'; Touray 3', 67'; Andrews (yellow card) 55'; Fernandes 87'	Box Score	Pyle (yellow card) 43'; Thomas (yellow card) 52'; Robinson (red card)	Stadium: City Stadium; Referee: Eric Weisbrod

May 17 7	Harrisburg City Islanders	2–2	Orlando City	Harrisburg, Pennsylvania
20:00	Touray 16'; Pelletier (yellow card) 24'; Ekra 72'	Box Score	Dwyer 22', 55'	Stadium: Skyline Sports Complex; Referee: Alex Chilowicz

May 24 8	Richmond Kickers	2–0	Harrisburg City Islanders	Charleston, South Carolina
19:00		Box Score		Stadium: MUSC Health Stadium; Referee: Brandon Marion

May 31 9	Charleston Battery	1–2	Harrisburg City Islanders	Charleston, South Carolina
19:30	Fisk 35'; Ellison (yellow card) 52'	Box Score	Bahner (yellow card) 32'; Touray 37'; Basso 54' (pen.)	Stadium: MUSC Health Stadium; Referee: Rob Mauws

June 1 10	Charlotte Eagles	0–4	Harrisburg City Islanders	Charlotte, North Carolina
20:00	Asante (yellow card) 56'; Herrera (yellow card) 79'	Box Score	Hernández 6'; Wheeler 18', 22'; McLaughlin 89'	Stadium: Queens University Stadium; Referee: Daniel Burak

June 5 11	Harrisburg City Islanders	2–0	Wilmington Hammerheads	Harrisburg, Pennsylvania
19:00	Evans 48' (o.g.); Andrews 75'	Box Score	Steres (red card); Wallace (yellow card) 79'	Stadium: Skyline Sports Complex; Referee: Cory Richardson

June 8 12	Harrisburg City Islanders	1–3	Colorado Rapids Reserves	Harrisburg, Pennsylvania
19:00	Langley 42'	Box Score	Armstrong (yellow card) 45'; Harbottle 75', 85', 89'; Mwanga (yellow card) 90'	Stadium: Skyline Sports Complex

June 16 13	Harrisburg City Islanders	3–1	Antigua Barracuda FC	Harrisburg, Pennsylvania
16:00	Pelletier (yellow card) 4'; Langley 29'; Touray 38'; Ekra 66'	Box Score	Daniel (yellow card) 34'; Mitchum 47'	Stadium: Skyline Sports Complex; Referee: Ian Bongaart

June 21 14	Harrisburg City Islanders	3–4	Pittsburgh Riverhounds	Harrisburg, Pennsylvania
16:00	Mellor 1'; McLaughlin 21'; Mkosana (yellow card) 90'; Touray 90+1'	Box Score	Motagalvan (yellow card) 27'; Angulo 48' (pen.), 75'; Amoo 58'; Seth 83'	Stadium: Skyline Sports Complex; Referee: Eric Weisbrod

June 28 15	Harrisburg City Islanders	2–1	Phoenix FC	Harrisburg, Pennsylvania
16:00	Ekra 15' (yellow card) 90'; Ribeiro (yellow card) 44'; Pelletier (yellow card) 52'; Touray (yellow card) 72' (goal) 73'; Mellor (yellow card) 89'	Box Score	Schafer 37' (yellow card) 78'; Toia (yellow card) 75'; Bento (yellow card) 90'	Stadium: Skyline Sports Complex; Referee: Michael Donovan

July 6 16	Wilmington Hammerheads	2–1	Harrisburg City Islanders	Wilmington, North Carolina
19:30	Steres 33'; Wallace (yellow card) 85'; Arnoux 90'	Box Score	Langley (yellow card) 68'; Touray 74'; Basso (yellow card) 76'	Stadium: Legion Stadium; Referee: David McPhon

July 10 17	Harrisburg City Islanders	2–4	Orange County Blues	Harrisburg, Pennsylvania
19:30	Anding 18'; Touray (yellow card) 33' (goal) 66'	Box Score	Davis 6'; González 12'; Garcia (yellow card) 45'; Fondy 46', 84' (yellow card) 85'; Mohammadi (yellow card) 60'; Momeni (yellow card) 90'	Stadium: Skyline Sports Complex; Referee: Ryan dos Reis

July 13 18	Harrisburg City Islanders	0–1	Richmond Kickers	Harrisburg, Pennsylvania
19:30	Basso (yellow card) 26'; Touray (yellow card) 90'	Box Score	Davies (yellow card) 75'; Seaton 76'	Stadium: Skyline Sports Complex; Referee: Darth Newman

July 19 19	VSI Tampa Bay	0–2	Harrisburg City Islanders	Plant City, Florida
19:30	Thuriere (yellow card) 44'	Box Score	Mkosana 12'; McLaughlin 87'	Stadium: Plant City Stadium; Referee: Mark Kadlecik

July 20 20	Orlando City	3–1	Harrisburg City Islanders	Orlando, Florida
19:30	Alexandre 25', 35'; Chin 71'; Ellis (yellow card) 89'	Box Score	Caceros (yellow card) 16'; Mkosana 79'	Stadium: Camping World Stadium; Referee: Donald Dellavia

July 24 21	Harrisburg City Islanders	5–1	Dayton Dutch Lions	Harrisburg, Pennsylvania
19:00	Mkosana 8', 46', 60'; Mellor (yellow card) 19'; Basso 45+2'; McLaughlin 86'	Box Score	Westdijk 20'; Harada (yellow card) 48'; Garner (yellow card) 60'; Klaasse (yellow card) 64'	Stadium: Skyline Sports Complex; Referee: Eric Weisbrod

July 31 22	Phoenix FC	1–3	Harrisburg City Islanders	Tempe, Arizona
22:30	Toia 49'; Morrison (yellow card) 75'	Box Score	Bahner 24' (yellow card) 60'; Mkosana 67'; Andrews (yellow card) 72'; Hardware 90+1'	Stadium: Sun Devil Soccer Stadium; Referee: Paul Nothman

August 3 23	Orange County Blues	2–2	Harrisburg City Islanders	Fullerton, California
22:30	Mohammadi (yellow card) 3'; Turner (yellow card) 26'; Davis 55'; Lopez (yellow card) 56'; O'Leary (yellow card) 59'; González (yellow card) 62'; Fondy 85'; Russell (yellow card) 89'	Box Score	Mkosana 38' (yellow card) 51'; Basso 50' (pen.)	Stadium: Titan Stadium; Referee: Jared Kennedy

August 7 24	Harrisburg City Islanders	1–2	Charlotte Eagles	Harrisburg, Pennsylvania
19:00	Hernández 6'; Basso (yellow card) 83'	Box Score	Ramirez 27'; Herrera 38'	Stadium: Skyline Sports Complex; Referee: Ayodeji Obisesan

August 10 25	Harrisburg City Islanders	3–1	VSI Tampa Bay	Harrisburg, Pennsylvania
19:00	Zizzi (yellow card) 34'; Mkosana 40', 67', 82'	Box Score	Salles 62'; Budniy (yellow card) 88'	Stadium: Skyline Sports Complex; Referee: John Douglas

August 17 26	Dayton Dutch Lions	3–1	Harrisburg City Islanders	Beavercreek, Ohio
19:00	Garner 56'; Bardsley 62'; Swartzendruber 69'	Box Score	Andrews 2'	Stadium: Beavercreek High School Stadium; Referee: Tony Crush

==== Results summary ====
Overall								Home						Away					
Pld	Pts	W	L	T	GF	GA	GD	W	L	T	GF	GA	GD	W	L	T	GF	GA	GD
26	44	14	10	2	55	39	+16	7	6	1	34	23	+11	7	4	1	21	16	+5

Last updated: January 18, 2017
Source: 2013 USL Pro season
Pld = Matches played; Pts = Points; W = Matches won; T = Matches tied; L = Matches lost; GF = Goals for; GA = Goals against; GD = Goal difference

Round	1	2	3	4	5	6	7	8	9	10	11	12	13	14	15	16	17	18	19	20	21	22	23	24	25	26
Stadium	A	A	H	H	A	H	H	A	A	A	H	H	H	H	H	A	H	H	A	A	H	A	A	H	H	A
Result	W	W	W	L	W	W	T	L	W	W	W	L	W	L	W	L	L	L	W	L	W	W	T	L	W	L

Source: 2013 USL Pro season & Game Results
A = Away; H = Home; W = Win; L = Loss; T = Tie

==== Playoffs ====
The City Islanders were beaten in the quarterfinals of the 2013 USL Pro season playoffs by the Charlotte Eagles. The North Carolina club ran out 3–1 winners.

August 24 Quarter-Finals	Harrisburg City Islanders	1–2	Charlotte Eagles	Harrisburg, Pennsylvania
14:00	Pelletier (yellow card) 46'; Touray (yellow card) 51'; Basso (red card); Mkosana 84'	Box Score	Ramirez 27'; Herrera 38'	Stadium: Skyline Sports Complex; Referee: Eric Weisbrod

=== U.S. Open Cup ===
The Harrisburg City Islanders were knocked out of the U.S. Open Cup at the second round stage by Reading United.

May 21 Second round	Reading United	1–0	Harrisburg City Islanders	Reading, Pennsylvania
	Pinto 9'; Rosenberry (yellow card) 42'; Lowe (yellow card) 67'; Neumann (yellow card) 90+'	Box Score	Touray (yellow card) 67'	Stadium: Don Thomas Stadium
