= Shaquille Dyer =

Jamaican footballer (born 1995)

Personal information
- Full name: Shaquille Dyer
- Date of birth: 10 August 1995 (age 31)
- Place of birth: Kingston, Jamaica
- Position: Defender

Team information
- Current team: Mount Pleasant Football Academy
- Number: 33

Youth career
- 2014: Arnett Gardens U-20

Senior career*
Years	Team	Apps	(Gls)
2014–2016	Arnett Gardens	15	(1)
2015	→ Harrisburg City Islanders (loan)	8	(0)
2016–2017	Waterhouse	10	(0)
2017	Humble Lions	5	(0)
2018	Portmore United	2	(0)
2018–2022	Dunbeholden	100	(0)
2022–	Mount Pleasant	30	(0)

International career^{‡}
2014–2015	Jamaica U-20	6	(0)
- * Club domestic league appearances and goals as of 9 December 2023 ‡ National team caps and goals as of 9 December 2023

Shaquille Dyer (born 10 August 1995) is a Jamaican footballer who plays for Mount Pleasant Football Academy in the Jamaica Premier League.

== Career ==
Dyer started his playing career at Arnett Gardens FC in Kingston, Jamaica where he served as team captain for U-20 squad for the 2014 season. He was promoted to Arnett Gardens FC's first team in the 2014 season and became established as a starting player during the 2015 season.

In 2015, Dyer secured a loan deal to play with Harrisburg City Islanders of the USL for the remainder of the 2015 season. He debuted for the Islanders on 18 July 2015 against the New York Red Bulls II. Dyer made a total of six appearances for the club but was not signed by the Islanders for the 2016 season.

Dyer returned to Jamaica in 2016 signing for Waterhouse, only spending one season with the club before moving to Humble Lions in 2017. After brief spells at Humble Lions and Portmore United, Dyer moved to Dunbeholden, spending 4 season with the club. Dyer signed for Mount Pleasant in 2022.

=== International ===
Dyer was a member of the Jamaica National U-20 Team that recently competed at the 2015 CONCACAF U-20 Championship held in Kingston in January 2015. He is also currently a member of the Jamaica U23 Olympic Pool.

== Honors ==
=== Portmore United ===
- Jamaica Premier League: 2017–18

=== Dunbeholden ===
- Jamaica Premier League runner-up: 2022

=== Mount Pleasant ===
- Jamaica Premier League: 2022–23
