= Luan Silva =

Luan Silva may refer to:

- Luan (footballer, born May 1993) (Luan da Conceição Silva), Brazilian footballer
- Luan Silva (footballer, born 1999), Brazilian footballer
