= Clésio =

Mozambican footballer (born 1994)

Personal information
- Full name: Clésio Palmirim David Baúque
- Date of birth: 11 October 1994 (age 32)
- Place of birth: Maputo, Mozambique
- Height: 1.83 m (6 ft 0 in)
- Position: Winger

Team information
- Current team: Black Bulls

Youth career
- 2012: Ferroviário
- 2012–2013: Benfica

Senior career*
Years	Team	Apps	(Gls)
2013–2016	Benfica B	13	(1)
2014	→ Harrisburg City Islanders (loan)	20	(5)
2015–2016	Benfica	1	(0)
2016–2018	Panetolikos	56	(2)
2018–2019	Istanbulspor	25	(2)
2019–2020	Gabala	18	(0)
2020–2021	Zira	28	(5)
2021–2023	Marítimo	20	(0)
2021	→ Marítimo B	1	(0)
2023	Honka	25	(6)
2024	Gabala	11	(1)
2024–2025	Al Arabi		(0)
2025–	Black Bulls		

International career^{‡}
- Mozambique U20
2011–	Mozambique	62	(9)
- * Club domestic league appearances and goals as of 4 December 2025 ‡ National team caps and goals as of 4 December 2025

Clésio Palmirim David Baúque (born 11 October 1994), known simply as Clésio, is a Mozambican professional footballer who plays as a winger for Mozambican side Black Bulls and the Mozambique national team.

== Club career ==
=== Benfica ===
Born in Maputo, Clésio started with Ferroviário and after becoming the top scorer of Moçambola with 6 goals, he signed for Benfica in September 2012, joining the Portuguese club in January 2013. Before joining Benfica, he claimed to be inspired to follow in the footsteps of Eusébio. He was assigned to the under-19 side, playing nine matches and scoring twice.

On 14 March 2014, Clésio was loaned to American club Harrisburg City Islanders, a team competing in the United Soccer League, the third tier of the United States soccer league system. He made his debut on 6 April, in an away draw against the Wilmington Hammerheads, and scored his first goal on 17 May, bagging a double within five minutes to give the City Islanders the lead over Dayton Dutch Lions. On 12 June, he added another goal and helped his team beat the Pittsburgh Riverhounds, to win their first league game in four match-days. On 24 August, he netted a double in a 2–2 draw with Rochester Rhinos, increasing his goal tally to five. It would be his last match for the City Islanders, having started 9 games in 20 appearances in total throughout their season.

After returning to Benfica, the 20-year old moved to the Benfica B in the Segunda Liga, making his debut on 1 February 2015, replacing Nuno Santos on the 87th minute of a home loss with Leixões. On 24 May 2015, Clésio scored his first goal for Benfica B in a home win against Vitória de Guimarães B. His goal was an individual effort where he dribble past several players and finished in front of Miguel Oliveira. In 2015–16, he remained in the B-team, playing four times in nine match-days. However, after Nélson Semedo injury, Rui Vitória promoted him to the first team and converted him to play right-back against Tondela on 30 October. It would be his sole appearance for the main team, as he was immediately demoted back to the reserves.

=== Panetolikos ===
On 30 January 2016, Clésio moved to Panetolikos, penning a three-year deal with the Greek-side. He made his Greek Super League debut on 8 February 2016 in an away game against Panionios.

=== Gabala ===
On 10 July 2019, Clésio signed a one-year contract with Azerbaijani club Gabala.

=== Zira ===
On 18 July 2020, Zira announced the signing of Clésio.

=== Honka ===
On 28 February 2023, Clésio signed a multi-year contract with Honka in Finland. After the season, Honka was suddenly declared for bankruptcy, and Clésio was released.

=== Gabala SC ===
On 9 January 2024, Clésio returned to Azerbaijan and re-signed with Gabala on a 2.5-year contract. On 27 May 2024, Gabala announced that Clésio and five others had left the club with their contracts expiring.

== International ==
At the youth level he played in the 2013 COSAFA U-20 Cup.

Clésio made his senior international debut for Mozambique on 15 November 2011 against Comoros during the first round of 2014 FIFA World Cup qualification. In the match, he also scored his first international goal, the fourth goal of the 4–1 victory. He was also part of Mozambique's squad during 2013 Africa Cup of Nations qualification.

== Career statistics ==
=== Club ===
As of 27 November 2024

Club statistics
Club	Season	League			Cup (Note: Includes Greek Cup, Turkish Cup, Azerbaijan Cup, Finnish Cup)		League Cup		Continental		Other		Total	
Club	Season	Division	Apps	Goals	Apps	Goals	Apps	Goals	Apps	Goals	Apps	Goals	Apps	Goals
Benfica B	2013–14	LigaPro	0	0	–		–		–		–		0	0
Benfica B	2014–15	LigaPro	4	1	–		–		–		–		4	1
Benfica B	2015–16	LigaPro	9	0	–		–		–		–		9	0
Benfica B	Total		13	1	–	–	–	–	–	–	–	–	13	1
Harrisburg City Islanders (loan)	2014	USL Pro	20	5	0	0	–		–		0	0	20	5
Benfica	2015–16	Primeira Liga	1	0	0	0	0	0	0	0	–		1	0
Panetolikos	2015–16	Super League Greece	7	0	0	0	–		–		–		7	0
Panetolikos	2016–17	Super League Greece	25	1	5	1	–		–		–		30	2
Panetolikos	2017–18	Super League Greece	24	1	5	2	–		–		–		29	3
Panetolikos	Total		56	2	10	3	–	–	–	–	–	–	66	5
İstanbulspor	2018–19	TFF 1. Lig	25	2	1	1	–		–		–		26	3
Gabala	2019–20	Azerbaijan Premier League	18	0	2	3	–		2 (Note: Appearances in UEFA Europa League)	0	–		22	3
Zira	2020–21	Azerbaijan Premier League	28	5	4	1	–		–		–		32	6
Marítimo	2021–22	Primeira Liga	18	0	0	0	0	0	–		–		18	0
Marítimo	2022–23	Primeira Liga	2	0	0	0	0	0	–		–		2	0
Marítimo	Total		20	0	0	0	0	0	0	0	0	0	20	0
Marítimo B	2021–22	Campeonato de Portugal	1	0	–		–		–		–		1	0
Honka	2023	Veikkausliiga	25	6	4	0	0	0	2 (Note: Appearances in UEFA Conference League)	0	–		31	6
Gabala	2023–24	Azerbaijan Premier League	11	1	2	0	–		–		–		13	1
Al-Arabi	2024–25	UAE First Division	5	0	–		–		–		–		5	0
Career total			223	22	23	8	0	0	4	0	–	–	250	30

=== International goals ===
Scores and results list Mozambique's goal tally first.

#	Date	Venue	Opponent	Score	Result	Competition
1.	15 November 2011	Estádio do Zimpeto, Maputo, Mozambique	Comoros	4–1	4–1	2014 FIFA World Cup qualification
2.	29 February 2012	Benjamin Mkapa National Stadium, Dar es Salaam, Tanzania	Tanzania	1–0	1–1	2013 Africa Cup of Nations qualification
3.	16 November 2016	Estádio do Zimpeto, Maputo, Mozambique	South Africa	1–0	1–1	Friendly
4.	25 March 2017	Estádio do Zimpeto, Maputo, Mozambique	Angola	1–0	2–0	Friendly
5.	10 September 2019	Estádio do Zimpeto, Maputo, Mozambique	Mauritius	1–0	2–0	2022 FIFA World Cup qualification
6.	18 June 2023	Stade Huye, Butare, Rwanda	Rwanda	2–0	2–0	2023 Africa Cup of Nations qualification
7.	9 September 2023	Estádio do Zimpeto, Maputo, Mozambique	Benin	1–1	3–2	2023 Africa Cup of Nations qualification
8.	16 November 2023	Obed Itani Chilume Stadium, Francistown, Botswana	Botswana	1–0	3–2	2026 FIFA World Cup qualification
9.	14 January 2024	Felix Houphouet Boigny Stadium, Abidjan, Ivory Coast	Egypt	2–1	2–2	2023 Africa Cup of Nations

== Honours ==
Benfica

- Primeira Liga: 2015–16
