= Dustin Bixler =

American soccer player

Personal information
- Full name: Dustin Bixler
- Date of birth: December 21, 1982 (age 43)
- Place of birth: Mechanicsburg, Pennsylvania, U.S.
- Height: 6 ft 3 in (1.91 m)
- Position: Defender

Youth career
- 2001–04: Lock Haven University Bald Eagles

Senior career*
Years	Team	Apps	(Gls)
2005–12	Harrisburg City Islanders	122	(1)
- * Club domestic league appearances and goals

Dustin Bixler (born December 21, 1982, in Mechanicsburg, Pennsylvania) is an American former professional soccer player who spent his entire career with Harrisburg City Islanders.

== Career ==
=== College ===
Bixler attended Red Land High School and was a four-year starter at Lock Haven University, playing 71 career games and earning All-Conference honors in 2002, 2003, and 2004. He was also named to the Division II All-Northeast Region First Team in 2003 and 2004, and was voted the team's Most Valuable Player and the Conference's Athlete of the Year after his senior season.

=== Professional ===
Bixler turned professional when he signed with Harrisburg City Islanders of the USL Second Division in 2005. He made his professional debut on May 5, 2007, as a substitute in a 4–3 win over the Charlotte Eagles.

He was named to the 2008 All-League Second Team, was MVP of the 2007 USL-2 Championship Match, and is Harrisburg's all-time leader in starts and minutes played. On February 2, 2010, Harrisburg City announced the re-signing of Bixler for the 2010 season.

Bixler scored his first professional goal on his 88th appearance for Harrisburg, a 2–1 victory over the Charleston Battery on May 22, 2010.

He re-signed with the club on March 11, 2011.

On September 7, 2012, Bixler announced his retirement from professional soccer after eight seasons, all with Harrisburg City.

== Coaching ==
Bixler is also the head coach of the Cedar Crest High School boys varsity soccer team.
