= Kyle Renfro =

American soccer player (born 1991)

Personal information
- Full name: Kyle Renfro
- Date of birth: April 30, 1991 (age 35)
- Place of birth: Lynchburg, Virginia, U.S.
- Height: 6 ft 1 in (1.85 m)
- Position: Goalkeeper

Youth career
- Roanoke Stars

College career
Years	Team	Apps	(Gls)
2010–2013	Virginia Tech Hokies		

Senior career*
Years	Team	Apps	(Gls)
2014	Charlotte Eagles	5	(0)
2015	Harrisburg City Islanders	1	(0)
2016–2017	Charlotte Independence	1	(0)

Managerial career
- 2016–2017: Winthrop Eagles (asst.)
- 2018: Virginia Tech Hokies (asst.)
- 2019–: Duke Blue Devils (asst.)
- * Club domestic league appearances and goals as of 4 April 2021

Kyle Renfro (born April 30, 1991) is an American retired soccer player who is currently an assistant coach for the Duke Blue Devils.

== Career ==
=== College ===
Renfro attended Virginia Tech and played four years of college soccer. Renfro started all 17 games for the Hokies in 2013, recording 1642 minutes and earning First Team Scholar All-America honors, Second Team All-Region honors, and First Team All-State honors. Renfro also became only the second Hokie to garner First Team All-ACC honors after leading the ACC in saves for three straight years with 88 saves total.

=== Professional ===
In 2014, Renfro began his professional career with the Charlotte Eagles making five appearances for the team.

In 2015, Renfro joined the Harrisburg City Islanders. He made his debut for the City Islanders in the third round of the 2015 U.S. Open Cup against the Rochester Rhinos. Renfro maintained the shutout until extra time, when the Islanders fell 1–3 at home.

In 2016, Renfro was signed by the Charlotte Independence.
