= Raoul Voss =

German football coach

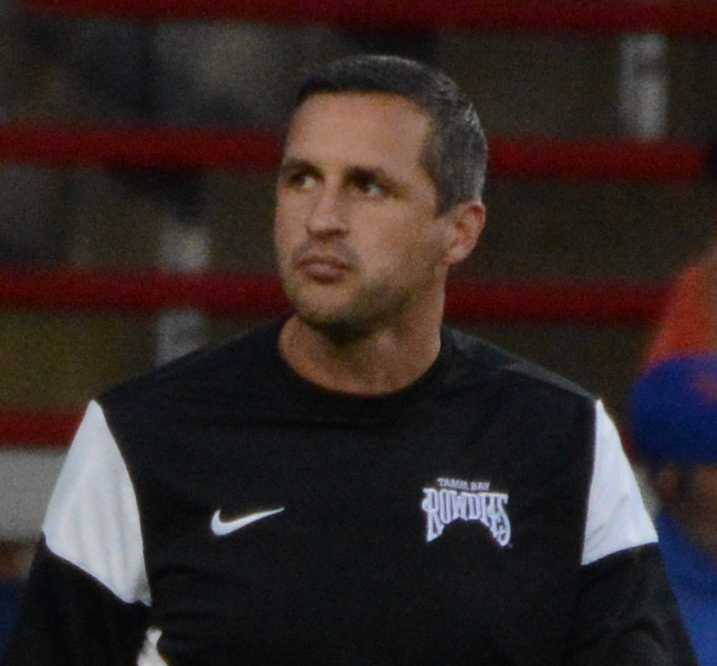
- Voss with Tampa Bay Rowdies in 2017

Personal information
- Date of birth: 26 May 1983 (age 43)
- Place of birth: Frankfurt am Main, Germany
- Height: 6 ft 2 in (1.88 m)
- Position: Defender

College career
Years	Team	Apps	(Gls)
2006–2009	FIU Panthers		
2009–2010	TGM SV Jügesheim		

Managerial career
- 2008–2009: Florida International University (assistant)
- 2011–2014: Fort Lauderdale Strikers (assistant)
- 2015: Fort Lauderdale Strikers (assistant)
- 2015–2017: Tampa Bay Rowdies (assistant)
- 2018: Penn FC
- 2021–present: VfL Wolfsburg (scout)

Raoul Voss is a German association football coach.

== Playing career ==
Voss played as a defender for the Florida International University and TGM SV Jügesheim.

== Managerial career ==
Voss became an assistant coach at Florida International University after a series of knee injuries ended his playing career. He would continue his coaching and technical staff development in Germany at both TSG Hoffenheim and Concordia Hamburg.

Returning to south Florida, Voss found work as an assistant coach with the NASL club, Fort Lauderdale Strikers until he was let go with head coach Gunter Kronsteiner in November 2015.

He joined Tampa Bay Rowdies in December 2015. Voss spent two seasons with the Rowdies, through their transition from NASL to the USL ahead of the 2017 season.

=== Penn FC ===
Voss was appointed his first professional head coaching position in February 2018 at Penn FC. He became the re-branded club's first official head coach. The club ceased operations following the end of the 2018 season.

=== Statistics ===
As of 29 November 2018

Team	From	To	Record				
Team	From	To	G	W	D	L	Win %
Penn FC	7 February 2018	13 October 2018	36	10	10	16	27.78
Total			36	10	10	16	27.78
