= Amara Soumah =

Guinean footballer

Personal information
- Full name: Amara Soumah
- Date of birth: 8 October 1990 (age 36)
- Place of birth: Conakry, Guinea
- Height: 1.85 m (6 ft 1 in)
- Position: Forward

Youth career
- 2007–2010: Colorado Rapids
- 2010–2012: ICC Cougars
- 2013–2014: Cal State Fullerton Titans

Senior career*
Years	Team	Apps	(Gls)
2015	Pittsburgh Riverhounds	11	(2)
- * Club domestic league appearances and goals

Amara Soumah (born 8 October 1990) is a Guinean professional footballer.

== Early life ==
Soumah was born in Conakry. He moved to the United States at age 13 and lived with relatives in Denver, Colorado.

== Youth and college ==
As a youth, Soumah was a member of the local Colorado Rush and Real Colorado club teams, and the academy of the Colorado Rapids of Major League Soccer. He was with the Rapids Academy, part of the U.S. Soccer Development Academy, from 2007 to 2010. Soumah played his freshman and sophomore years of college with the Cougars of Illinois Central College. He earned the team's "Forward of the Year" award his freshman year and its "Player of the Year" award his sophomore season. During the 2012–2013 season, he recorded 21 goals and 10 assists in 17 appearances. Following the season, Soumah transferred to California State University, Fullerton and played two seasons for the Titans. In total, he tallied eight goals in 38 appearances for the team and helped the school win the Big West championship in November 2014.

== Professional ==
In April 2015, Soumah trialed with Pittsburgh Riverhounds and appeared in a scrimmage match against the Pitt Panthers on 7 April as his first match with the club. In this match, he assisted on the Riverhounds' second goal of the 2–0 victory. On 15 April 2015, it was announced that Soumah had officially signed with the club for the 2015 USL season. His first appearance for the Riverhounds after signing with the club came in an exhibition match against the Saint Francis Red Flash which ended as a 3–0 victory for the Riverhounds. Soumah made his league debut in the club's next match, coming on as a 68th-minute substitute for Lebogang Moloto before being subbed off himself for Anthony Virgara in the 84th minute in a 1–1 draw with Louisville City FC on 19 April. On May 30, 2015, Soumah scored his first league goal for the Riverhounds in what a columnist called the "club’s greatest ever game" as the team scored three goals in stoppage time for a 6–5 victory over the Harrisburg City Islanders.
