= Jimmy McLaughlin (American soccer) =

American soccer midfielder (born 1993)

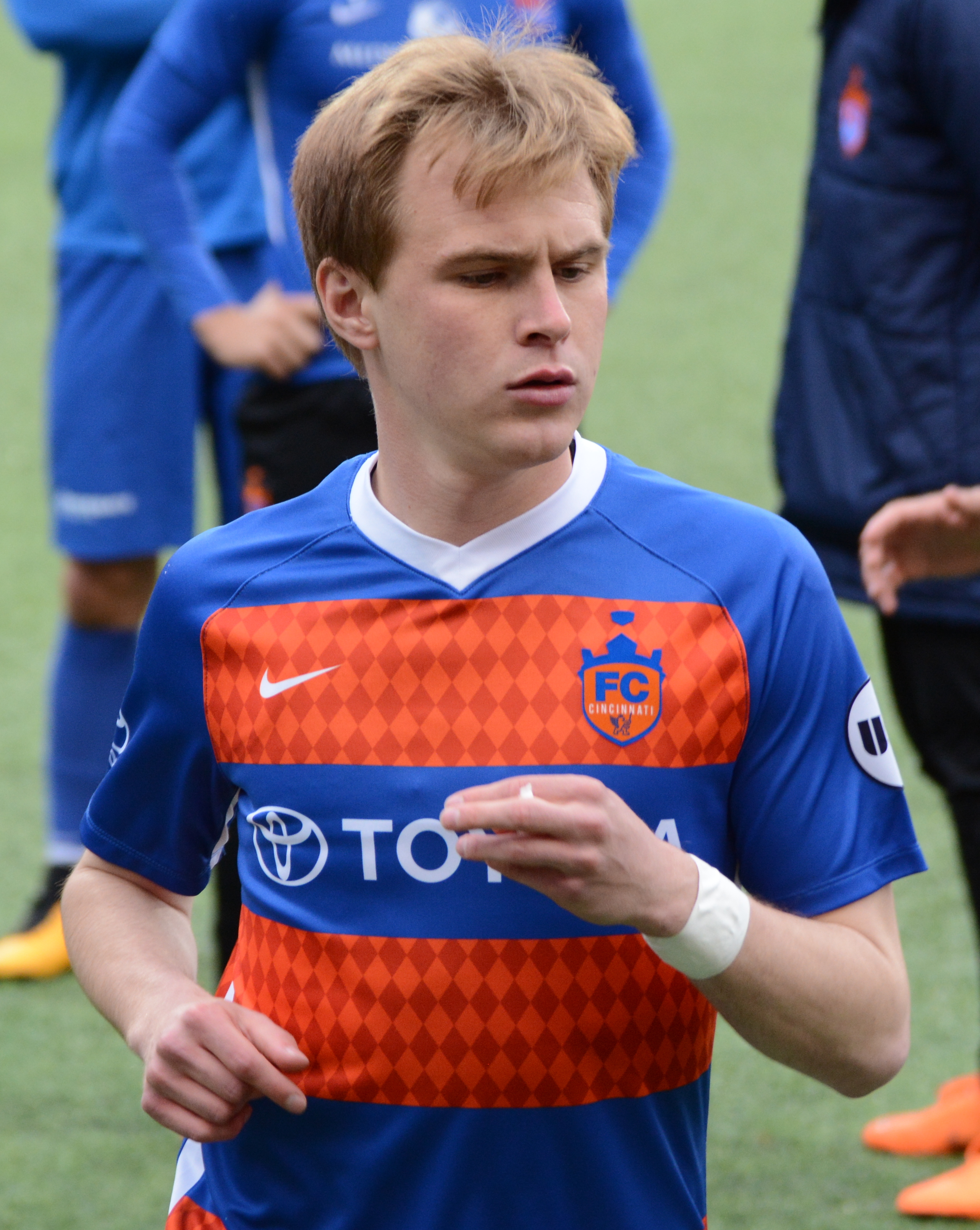
- McLaughlin warming up with FC Cincinnati in 2018

Personal information
- Full name: James Joseph McLaughlin III
- Date of birth: April 30, 1993 (age 33)
- Place of birth: Bryn Mawr, Pennsylvania, United States
- Height: 1.73 m (5 ft 8 in)
- Positions: Midfielder; forward

Youth career
- 2008–2011: FC Delco

College career
Years	Team	Apps	(Gls)
2011	Colgate Raiders	22	(1)

Senior career*
Years	Team	Apps	(Gls)
2012–2015	Philadelphia Union	3	(0)
2012–2015	→ Harrisburg City Islanders (loan)	50	(8)
2016–2020	FC Cincinnati	92	(11)
2021	Louisville City	21	(3)
- * Club domestic league appearances and goals

James Joseph McLaughlin III (born April 30, 1993) is an American former professional soccer midfielder who last played for USL Championship side Louisville City.

He began his professional career in 2012 as a homegrown player for MLS side Philadelphia Union. However, after two years without seeing much playing time, he spent 2014 and 2015 on loan to the Harrisburg City Islanders of the United Soccer League (USL).

McLaughlin left his native Philadelphia in 2016 to sign with USL expansion club FC Cincinnati. He became a fan favorite in Cincinnati and made 91 appearances through the club's first three seasons. As FC Cincinnati moved up to MLS for the 2019 season, he was signed to an MLS contract, but missed the entire season recovering from knee surgery. After a period of uncertainty, the club renewed his contract for the 2020 season.

== Youth and college ==
McLaughlin spent three seasons with Union Youth Development Affiliate FC Delco. In 2010–2011, McLaughlin led the club with 16 goals in 24 appearances.

Following his stint with Delco, McLaughlin committed to Colgate University. In his freshman year, McLaughlin was one of only six players and the only freshman to start in all 22 matches for Colgate during the 2011 season. On August 27, 2011, McLaughlin scored in his first collegiate start in a 1–0 win over Syracuse University. He finished the season with one goal and three assists in 22 appearances and was named 2011 Patriot League Rookie of the Year.

== Professional career ==
=== Philadelphia Union ===
On December 12, 2011, McLaughlin signed with the Philadelphia Union as the club's second homegrown player. He made his professional debut on May 29, 2012, coming on as a sub for Freddy Adu in a 3–0 win over the Rochester Rhinos in the third round of the 2012 U.S. Open Cup.

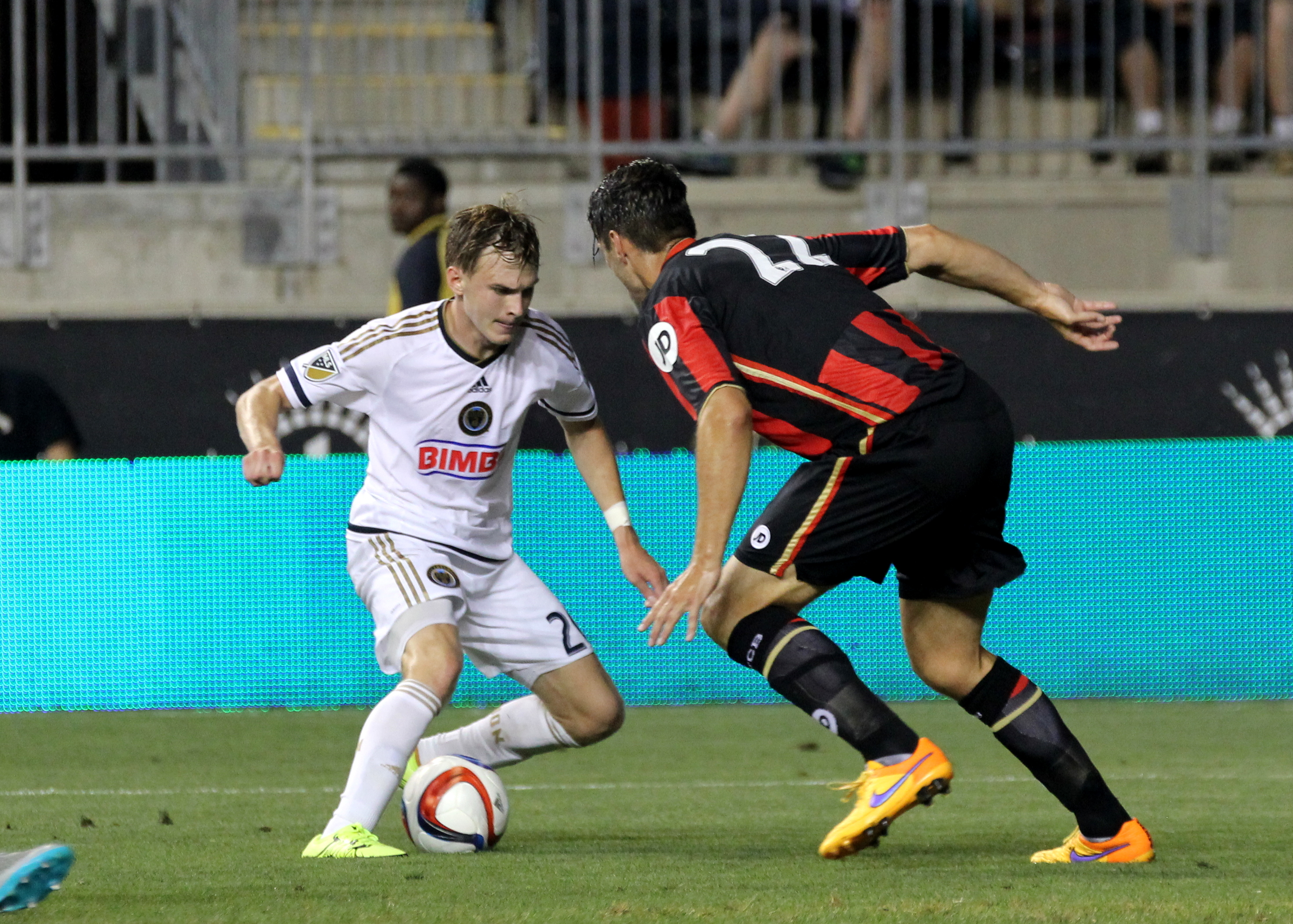
McLaughlin facing AFC Bournemouth defender Elliott Ward in 2015

He made his MLS debut on October 24, 2012, coming on as a sub for Danny Cruz in the 73rd minute during a 1–2 loss against Sporting Kansas City.

=== Harrisburg City Islanders ===
McLaughlin had been regularly loaned out to the Philadelphia Union third tier affiliate, Harrisburg City Islanders. The affiliation had loaned McLaughlin out sparingly until the 2014 season where he was sent out on a season-long loan. The move made McLaughlin an integral player in the Islanders campaign. He shared the team golden boot in 2014 with six goals and helped the Islanders through the USL playoffs ultimately finishing runners-up in the 2014 USL Pro final.

McLaughlin was loaned for individual matches during the 2015 season, making nine appearances and registering one goal.

=== FC Cincinnati ===
McLaughlin signed with expansion USL club FC Cincinnati ahead of the 2016 season. From the beginning of his Cincinnati career, head coach John Harkes used McLaughlin as one of his main starting midfielders. McLaughlin made 21 appearances, all starts, in his first season, tied for second-most on the team. McLaughlin played an offensive style of midfielding, leading him to score four regular season goals as well as one goal in the 2016 U.S. Open Cup. His total of five goals was the third highest on the team.

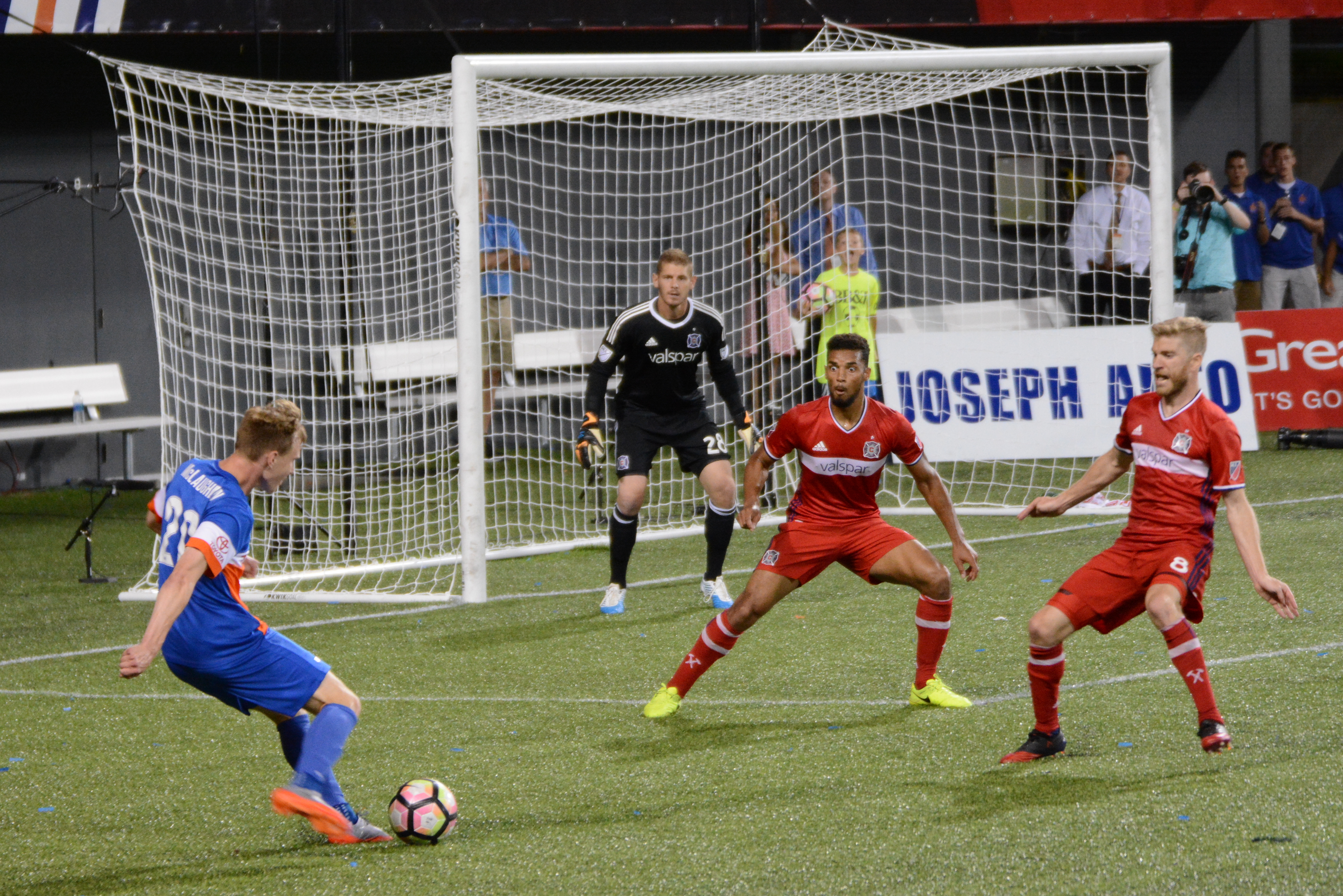
McLaughlin shooting on Chicago Fire in the 2017 U.S. Open Cup

He continued to be a primary starter for Cincinnati the following season, under the leadership of new head coach Alan Koch. In 2017, he started in 27 of his 32 appearances, made 3 U.S. Open Cup appearances, and scored 5 goals. By this time, McLaughlin had become fan favorite among close followers of the club, and was known for his goal celebration dances. He was also referred to by some as a key playmaker for the team, with Koch telling a reporter, "He's a younger player obviously in this business, and he's definitely got areas of his game to work on, but the beauty of Jimmy is he's got the willingness to address his deficiencies." On June 28, FC Cincinnati faced Chicago Fire SC in the Round of 16 of the 2017 U.S. Open Cup. In the penalty shootout that followed a scoreless 120 minutes, McLaughlin scored one of the three goals that lead his club to a win.

McLaughlin was one of just nine FC Cincinnati players to return for the 2018 season, as Koch spent the offseason making significant revisions to the roster. Although McLaughlin did make the cut, he began to see less starts and was used more as a late-game relief substitute. In the first twelve regular-season matches for the club, McLaughlin has seen 9 appearances, only 3 of which were starts.

On December 10, 2018, FC Cincinnati, which was then transitioning up to Major League Soccer for the 2019 season, announced that they had signed McLaughlin to an MLS contract. However, on January 9, 2019, he suffered a serious knee injury while training. This was later determined to be a torn ACL, which required surgery and forced him to miss the entire 2019 season in recovery.

McLaughlin's contract with FC Cincinnati was not initially renewed ahead of the 2020 season; however, he joined the club's preseason training camp in January 2020 in hopes of re-earning a roster spot. FC Cincinnati announced that McLaughlin had been re-signed for 2020 on February 7, following the conclusion of the training camp.

He was released by Cincinnati at the end of their 2020 season.

=== Louisville City ===
On December 29, 2020, McLaughlin joined USL Championship side Louisville City.

== Career statistics ==
Club performance			League		U.S. Open Cup		League Cup		Continental		Total	
Season	Club	League	Apps	Goals	Apps	Goals	Apps	Goals	Apps	Goals	Apps	Goals
2012	Philadelphia Union	Major League Soccer	1	0	2	0	0	0	0	0	3	0
2012	Harrisburg City Islanders (loan)	USL Pro	7	0	0	0	2	0	0	0	9	0
2013	Philadelphia Union	Major League Soccer	0	0	0	0	0	0	0	0	0	0
2013	Harrisburg City Islanders (loan)	USL Pro	8	1	1	0	0	0	0	0	9	1
2014	Philadelphia Union	Major League Soccer	1	0	0	0	0	0	0	0	1	0
2014	Harrisburg City Islanders (loan)	USL Pro	26	6	0	0	0	0	0	0	26	6
2015	Philadelphia Union	Major League Soccer	1	0	0	0	0	0	0	0	1	0
2015	Harrisburg City Islanders (loan)	USL	9	1	0	0	0	0	0	0	9	1
2016	FC Cincinnati	USL	31	4	2	1	1	0	0	0	34	5
2017	FC Cincinnati	USL	32	5	3	0	1	0	0	0	36	5
2018	FC Cincinnati	USL	30	2	3	1	2	0	0	0	35	3
2019	FC Cincinnati	Major League Soccer	0	0	0	0	0	0	0	0	0	0
Philadelphia Union total			3	0	2	0	0	0	0	0	5	0
Harrisburg City Islanders total			50	8	1	0	2	0	0	0	53	8
FC Cincinnati total			93	11	8	2	4	0	0	0	105	13
Career total			146	19	13	2	6	0	0	0	163	21
