= Danny DiPrima =

American soccer player

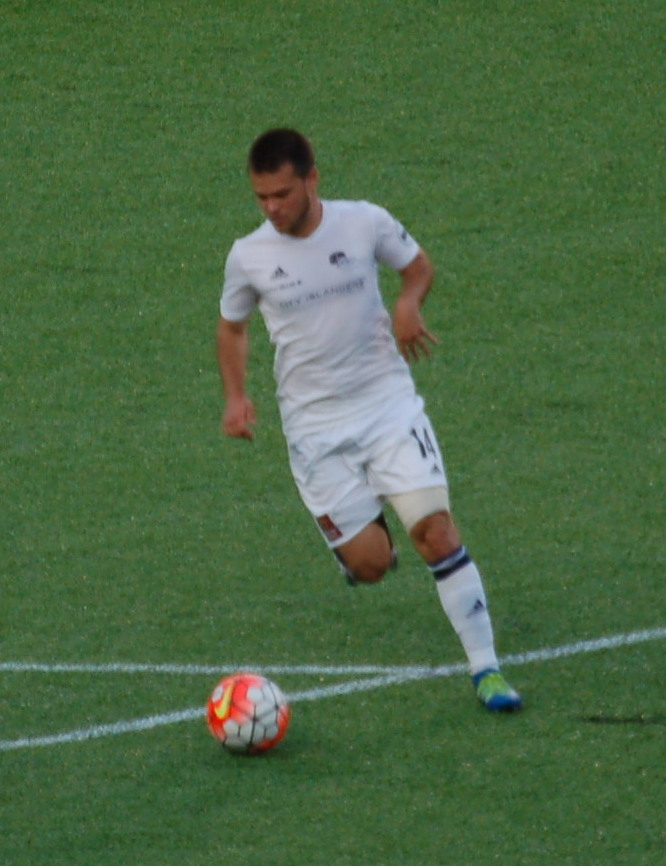
- DiPrima in 2016

Personal information
- Date of birth: October 30, 1991 (age 34)
- Place of birth: Dillsburg, Pennsylvania, U.S.
- Height: 1.83 m (6 ft 0 in)
- Position: Midfielder

Team information
- Current team: Harrisburg Heat
- Number: 4

College career
Years	Team	Apps	(Gls)
2010	St. John's Red Storm	10	(0)
2011–2013	NC State Wolfpack	51	(3)

Senior career*
Years	Team	Apps	(Gls)
2013–2014	Harrisburg Heat (indoor)	6	(0)
2014–2017	Harrisburg City Islanders	59	(2)
2017–	Harrisburg Heat (indoor)	123	(4)

Managerial career
- 2018–2021: York Spartans (assistant)
- 2022–: Millersville Marauders (assistant)
- * Club domestic league appearances and goals as of November 27, 2024

Danny DiPrima (born October 30, 1991) is an American soccer player who currently plays for the Harrisburg Heat in the Major Arena Soccer League.

== Career ==
Diprima played his youth soccer for JBS FC a premier club based out of Westchester County, New York and was coached by Jonathan Langer. While at JBS FC Diprima helped lead his JBS FC team to Tournament Titles at the Disney Soccer Showcase, Potomac Memorial Day Tournament, Annandale Premier Cup, etc.. DiPrima played college soccer at St. John's University in 2010, before transferring to North Carolina State University in 2011.

DiPrima signed with USL Pro club Harrisburg City Islanders on March 27, 2014.
