= Andrew Ribeiro =

American soccer player (born 1990)

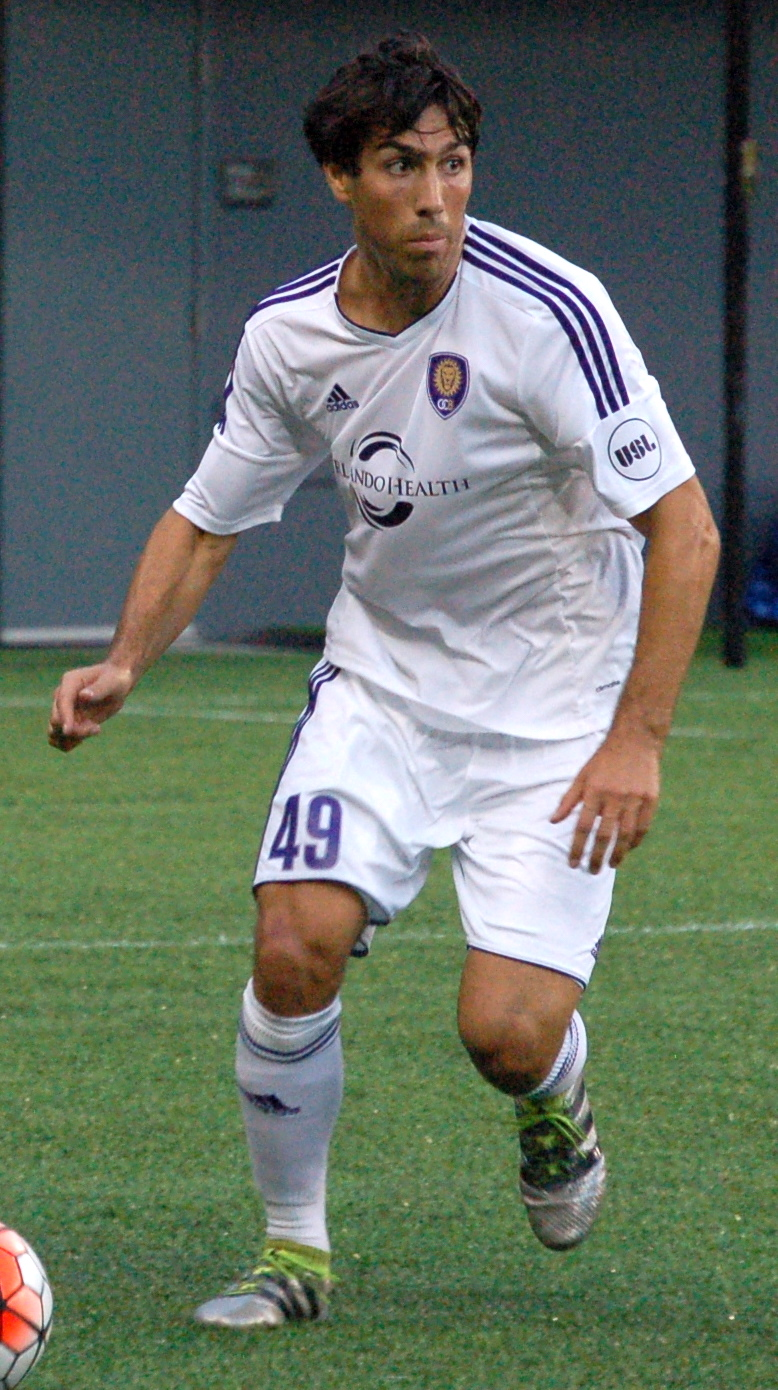
- Ribeiro playing with Orlando City B in 2016

Personal information
- Date of birth: October 22, 1990 (age 36)
- Place of birth: Green Bay, Wisconsin, United States
- Height: 1.82 m (6 ft 0 in)
- Position: Defender

Team information
- Current team: Chicago House AC

College career
Years	Team	Apps	(Gls)
2009–2012	Creighton Bluejays		

Senior career*
Years	Team	Apps	(Gls)
2011	Chicago Fire Premier	9	(1)
2012	Portland Timbers U23s	14	(2)
2013	Harrisburg City Islanders	24	(0)
2014	Chivas USA	0	(0)
2014	Pittsburgh Riverhounds	7	(0)
2015	Charlotte Independence	28	(0)
2016	Orlando City B	25	(1)
2021–	Chicago House AC	0	(0)
- * Club domestic league appearances and goals as of October 1, 2021

Andrew Ribeiro (born October 22, 1990) is an American soccer player who plays for National Independent Soccer Association club Chicago House AC.

== Prep career ==
In high school, Ribeiro played four years of varsity soccer at Green Bay's Notre Dame Academy. Boasting a 44–9–4 record during his junior and senior years, Ribeiro lead his team to back to back state titles in 2008 and 2009 while earning First Team All-Conference both years. He was named the Green Bay Press Gazette's Player of the Year and tabbed second-team all-state as a senior, after totalling 64 points on 26 goals and 12 assists. Ribeiro participated in the Masonic All-Star Game as a senior and had 19 goals, six assists and 44 points as a junior Olympic Development Program Super Y National Team Selection in 2008.

== College career ==
Ribeiro played four years of college soccer at Creighton University between 2009 and 2012. During his time at Creighton, Ribeiro helped lead the Bluejays to two consecutive NCAA College Cup appearances. In addition, he was named NSCAA All-American First Team in 2012 as a senior, as well as the Missouri Valley Conference Defensive Player of the Year.

== Professional career ==
On January 22, 2013, Ribeiro was selected in the fourth round, 70th overall, of the 2013 MLS Supplemental Draft by New York Red Bulls. After being released by New York during the pre-season, Ribeiro was signed by Harrisburg City Islanders and was a regular starter for the club appearing in 24 league matches in his first professional season.

He signed with Chivas USA ahead of the 2014 season but was released a month into the season without making a first team appearance.

Ribeiro signed with USL Pro club Pittsburgh Riverhounds on July 29, 2014.

After five years off from competing professionally, Ribeiro joined Chicago House AC of the National Independent Soccer Association on September 30, 2021.

== Personal life ==
Andrew resides in Chicago and is a skilled pool player, with an APA (American Poolplayers Association) rating of 5. He is a big fan of 50 Cent.
