= Luan (footballer, born May 1993) =

Brazilian footballer

Personal information
- Full name: Luan da Conceição Silva
- Date of birth: May 28, 1993 (age 33)
- Place of birth: Rio de Janeiro, Brazil
- Height: 1.82 m (6 ft 0 in)
- Position: Midfielder

Youth career
- Botafogo
- Corinthians

Senior career*
Years	Team	Apps	(Gls)
2013–2014	Corinthians	0	(0)
2013	→ Flamengo (SP) (loan)	0	(0)
2014	→ Harrisburg City Islanders (loan)	8	(0)
2015–2016	Boavista (RJ)	0	(0)
2016	Cruzeiro (RS)	0	(0)
2017	Potiguar de Mossoró	0	(0)
2017	São Gonçalo (RJ)	0	(0)
- * Club domestic league appearances and goals as of 2017

Luan da Conceição Silva (born May 28, 1993) is a Brazilian footballer who has played professionally in Brazil and the United States.

== Career ==
Luan began playing football in Corinthians' youth system. He was loaned to Harrisburg City Islanders in 2014, and played in various Brazilian state leagues with Flamengo (SP), Cruzeiro (RS) and Boavista (RJ) before signing with Potiguar de Mossoró in early 2017.
