= David Flynn (soccer) =

American soccer player

Personal information
- Date of birth: March 21, 1989 (age 37)
- Place of birth: Warsaw, Indiana, United States
- Height: 6 ft 3 in (1.91 m)
- Position: Goalkeeper

College career
Years	Team	Apps	(Gls)
2007–2010	St. Bonaventure Bonnies		

Senior career*
Years	Team	Apps	(Gls)
2012	Pittsburgh Riverhounds	0	(0)
2013–2014	Harrisburg City Islanders	2	(0)
- * Club domestic league appearances and goals as of September 15, 2014

David Flynn (born March 21, 1989, in Warsaw, Indiana) is an American soccer player who played for the Harrisburg City Islanders in the USL Pro.

== Career ==
=== College and amateur ===
Flynn played four years of college soccer at St. Bonaventure University between 2007 and 2010.

=== Professional ===
Flynn signed with USL Pro club Pittsburgh Riverhounds in December 2013, before moving to Harrisburg City Islanders in April 2013.

He made his professional debut on August 23, 2014, as a 33rd-minute substitute in a 2–2 draw against Rochester Rhinos.
