= Colin Zizzi =

American footballer (born 1988)

Personal information
- Full name: Colin Zizzi
- Date of birth: January 20, 1988 (age 38)
- Place of birth: Carlisle, Pennsylvania, United States
- Height: 5 ft 8 in (1.73 m)
- Position: Midfielder

Youth career
- 2007–2010: American Eagles

Senior career*
Years	Team	Apps	(Gls)
2010–2011	Vallecas CF		
2012–2014	Harrisburg City Islanders	50	(0)
- * Club domestic league appearances and goals as of September 15, 2014

Colin Zizzi (born January 20, 1988) is a former American soccer player. Zizzi played for Tercera División side Vallecas CF during the 2010–11 season. The following year, he joined Harrisburg City Islanders.
