= Yann Ekra =

Footballer (born 1990)

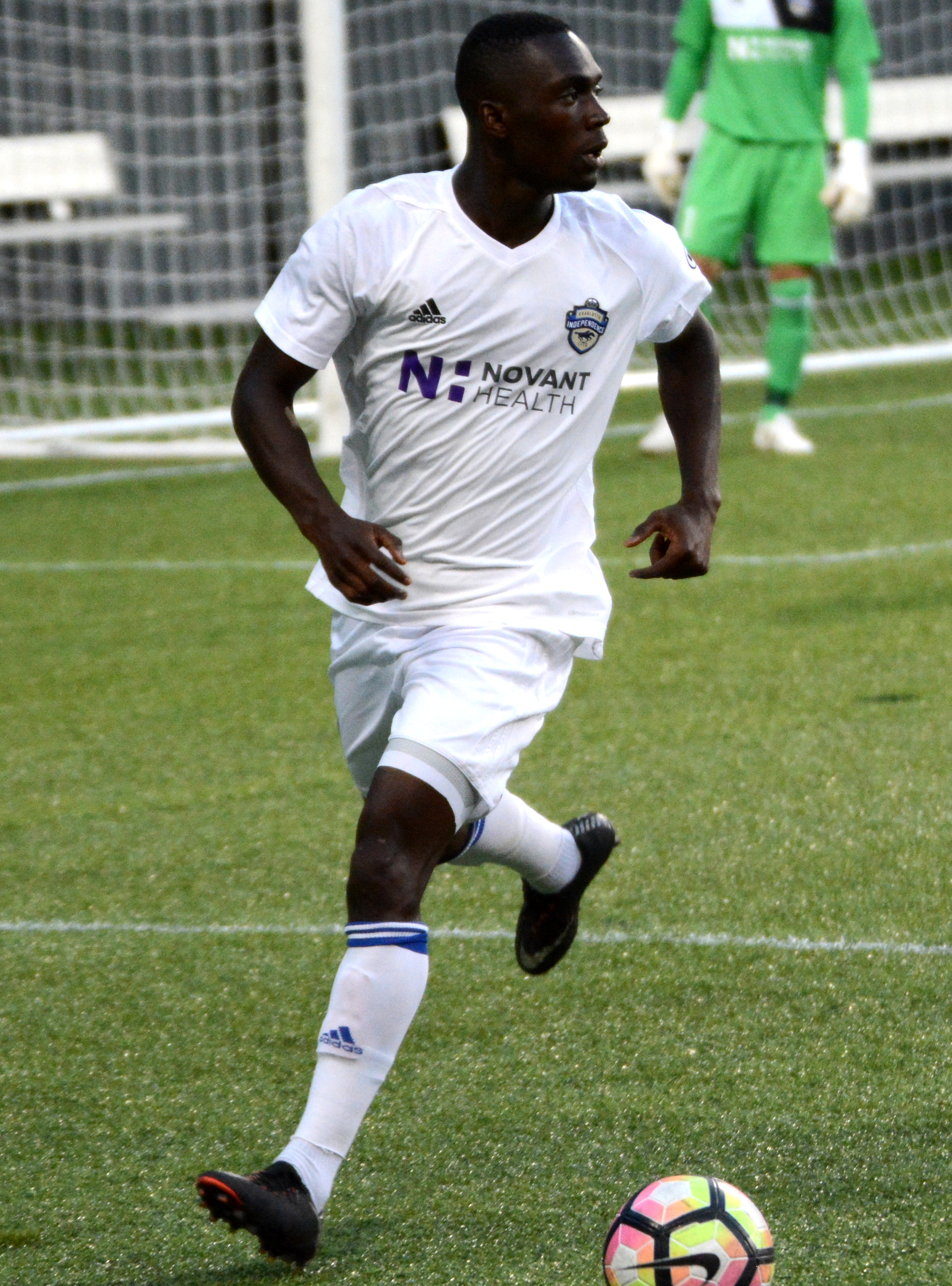
- Ekra with Charlotte Independence in 2017

Personal information
- Date of birth: 12 October 1990 (age 36)
- Place of birth: Abidjan, Ivory Coast
- Height: 1.80 m (5 ft 11 in)
- Position: Midfielder

Youth career
- 2000–2002: Esperance Paris 19ème
- 2002–2008: Lyon B

Senior career*
Years	Team	Apps	(Gls)
2007–2008	Lyon B	2	(1)
2008–2010	Hull City	0	(0)
2009	→ Panionios (loan)	0	(0)
2010–2012	Châteauroux	0	(0)
2012–2013	Harrisburg City Islanders	45	(10)
2012–2013	Harrisburg Heat (indoor)	11	(7)
2013	Philadelphia Union	0	(0)
2014–2015	Harrisburg City Islanders	54	(3)
2016–2018	Charlotte Independence	69	(3)
2019–2023	Tampa Bay Rowdies	112	(3)
Total		293	(27)

International career
- France U15
- France U16
- France U17
- France U18

Managerial career
- 2025–: Tampa Bay Rowdies (assistant)
- * Club domestic league appearances and goals as of 05:41, 25 April 2024 (UTC)

Yann Ekra (born 10 December 1990) is a former professional footballer who played as a midfielder. Born in Ivory Coast, he represented France at youth international level. He is currently an assistant coach with the Tampa Bay Rowdies in the USL Championship.

A product of the Lyon academy, Ekra began his senior career in England with Hull City, before enjoying a loan spell at Greek club Panionios. He then signed for French club Châteauroux in 2010. In 2012, having not yet made a first-team league appearance in his career, Ekra moved to the United States and signed for the Harrisburg City Islanders. He established himself as a key player, and simultaneously competed for the Harrisburg Heat in indoor soccer competitions.

After a brief period at the Philadelphia Union of Major League Soccer, Ekra returned to the Islanders for another two seasons. He then signed for the Charlotte Independence in December 2015, where he competed for the following three seasons. Ekra signed for the Tampa Bay Rowdies ahead of the 2019 season, eventually helping the club win two Eastern Conference titles in 2020 and 2021 before leaving in 2023.

== Club career ==
=== Lyon ===
Ekra began his youth career with Esperance Paris 19ème at the age of 11. He joined Lyon at the age of 12. His roommate for several years was Karim Benzema. Ekra played two games and scored one goal for Lyon's reserve team in the 2007–08 season.

=== Hull City ===
Ekra signed with Hull City at the beginning of the 2008–09 season. In the 2009–10 season, he played seven games for the reserve team, but did not score.

To further his career, Ekra joined Greek side Panionios on loan in January 2009 until the end of the season. He played for the club's under-21 side. He did not play any first team games although he made the gameday roster in a Super League Greece game in which Panionios beat Asteras Tripoli 4–3 on 26 April 2009.

On 29 May 2010, Ekra was released by Hull.

=== Châteauroux ===
For the 2010–11 and 2011–12 seasons, Ekra played in France on the reserve team of Châteauroux.

=== Harrisburg City Islanders ===
While visiting his in-laws in Washington D.C. in the Spring of 2012, Ekra attended an open tryout with Harrisburg City Islanders of USL Pro. Following a strong performance in preseason scrimmages in which Ekra scored three goals in three games, he signed with the team. He made his debut on 4 May 2012 in 2–1 loss to the Charlotte Eagles. In his first start on 19 May 2012 against Dayton Dutch Lions, Ekra scored a hat trick on his first three shots. In the 2012 regular season, he played 21 regular season games – scoring 6 goals and assisting on 1 goal. He also played three U.S. Open Cup games – scoring one goal and assisting on three goals. He also played in one playoff game. In the 2013 regular season, he played 24 regular season games – scoring 4 goals and assisting on 3 goals. He also played in one playoff game and one U.S. Open Cup game.

After the 2012 season, Ekra trialed with D.C. United of Major League Soccer.

=== Harrisburg Heat (Indoor) ===
In 2012–13, Ekra played his first season of indoor soccer with the Harrisburg Heat of the Professional Arena Soccer League. He made his debut on 3 November 2012 in a 6–2 loss to the Dallas Sidekicks. His most productive performance was a two-goal, three-assist performance in a 10–8 loss against the Chicago Mustangs. He finished the season playing 11 games, scoring 7 goals and assisting on 8 goals.

=== Philadelphia Union ===
On 13 September 2013, Ekra signed with the Philadelphia Union of Major League Soccer. In 2012, Ekra had been productive against Philadelphia – scoring a goal in a 12 June 2012 friendly in which Harrisburg City Islanders won, getting two assists in a 26 June 2012 5–2 U.S. Open Cup loss to the Union as well as playing as a guest player and assisting on the only goal in a D.C. United 1–0 reserve league win over the Union on 12 October 2012. He did not appear for the club and was released at the end of the 2013 season.

=== Return to Harrisburg City Islanders ===
In March 2014, Ekra returned to Harrisburg City Islanders.

=== Charlotte Independence ===
Ekra signed with the Charlotte Independence in December 2015.

=== Tampa Bay Rowdies ===
On 7 December 2018, Ekra moved to the Tampa Bay Rowdies of the USL Championship ahead of their 2019 season.

== International career ==
Ekra played on national youth teams for France at the U15, U16, U17 and U18 levels. He played on the U17 team that won the Disney Soccer Showcase in 2005.

== Coaching career ==
In April 2025, Ekra returned to the Rowdies as an assistant coach.

== Personal life ==
Ekra's daughter Kylie has been called in to camps with both the United States girls' national under-15 team in April 2025, and the French girls' national under-15 team in October 2025.
