= Garret Pettis =

American soccer player

Personal information
- Full name: Garret Pettis
- Date of birth: August 31, 1989 (age 37)
- Place of birth: Elizabethtown, Pennsylvania, U.S.
- Height: 1.83 m (6 ft 0 in)
- Position: Forward

Youth career
- 2008–2011: Lipscomb Bisons

Senior career*
Years	Team	Apps	(Gls)
2012	Harrisburg City Islanders	22	(3)
2014–2016	Harrisburg City Islanders	59	(6)
- * Club domestic league appearances and goals as of October 2, 2016

Garret Pettis (born August 31, 1989) is an American retired soccer player who recently played for Harrisburg City Islanders in the USL Professional Division.
