= Nick Noble (soccer) =

American soccer player

Personal information
- Full name: Nicholas Noble
- Date of birth: September 1, 1984 (age 42)
- Place of birth: Charleston, West Virginia, U.S.
- Height: 6 ft 4 in (1.93 m)
- Position: Goalkeeper

College career
Years	Team	Apps	(Gls)
2003–2006	West Virginia Mountaineers		

Senior career*
Years	Team	Apps	(Gls)
2005	Bradenton Academics	4	(0)
2006	West Virginia Chaos	11	(0)
2007–2009	Chicago Fire	0	(0)
2009	Austin Aztex	5	(0)
2010–2011	Ljungskile SK	59	(0)
2012–2017	Harrisburg City Islanders	122	(0)
2016–2017	Harrisburg Heat (indoor)	1	(0)

Managerial career
- 2018–: West Virginia Mountaineers (assistant)
- * Club domestic league appearances and goals as of May 15, 2020

Nicholas Noble (born September 1, 1984) is an American retired soccer player. Noble is currently an assistant coach for the West Virginia Mountaineers men's soccer team.

== Career ==
=== College and amateur ===
Noble was born in Charleston, West Virginia. He grew up in Damascus, Maryland, played soccer and attended Georgetown Preparatory School from 1999 to 2003, played college soccer at West Virginia University from 2003 to 2006, where he was a four-year starter for the Mountaineers appearing in 80 matches. He was named Big East Conference Goalkeeper of the Year in 2006 under first-year head coach Marlon LeBlanc. During his college years he also played with both Bradenton Academics and West Virginia Chaos in the USL Premier Development League.

=== Professional ===
Noble was drafted in the first round, 7th overall, by the Chicago Fire in the 2007 MLS Supplemental Draft. He made his professional debut on July 1, 2008, in the Lamar Hunt U.S. Open Cup against Cleveland City Stars, but never made an MLS appearance for the Fire prior to his release on June 26, 2009.

On December 13, 2009, Swedish Superettan club Ljungskile SK confirmed that they had signed Nick Noble. He quickly established himself as the club's top goal keeper and appeared in 59 league matches for Ljungskile. On December 22, 2011, Noble announced to his fans in Sweden that he had signed a contract to return to his home country and play for the Los Angeles Galaxy of Major League Soccer. On February 29, 2012, Noble was waived so the Galaxy could sign Bill Gaudette.

Noble signed with USL Pro club Harrisburg City Islanders in April, 2012. After the 2012 season he was nominated for the USL Goalkeeper of the Year award and his coach Bill Becher called him one of the best goalkeepers that the club has ever had. The following year he was one of the top performing goalkeepers of the 2013 USL Pro season and was selected for the All League Second Team.

On November 29, 2017, the City Islanders announced Noble's retirement.

=== Coaching ===
Noble returned to his alma mater West Virginia University in 2018, joining the men's soccer coaching staff.
