= Harrisburg City Islanders =

Defunct soccer team in Pennsylvania

- Founded: September 24, 2003; 23 years ago
- Dissolved: December 2019; 6 years ago
- Stadium: FNB Field, Harrisburg, Pennsylvania, United States
- Capacity: 6,187
- League: United Soccer League
Home colors	Away colors

Penn FC crest from their final season

Harrisburg City Islanders, known as Penn FC in their final season, were an American professional soccer team based in Harrisburg, Pennsylvania, United States. Founded in 2003, the team most recently played in the USL Pro, the second tier of the United States soccer league system.

In October 2018, the club formally announced it would not participate in the 2019 season and would have to resume play in 2020 as a member of USL League One, a league in the third tier. In December 2019, it was reported that the club had ceased operations and had no employees.

On November 15, 2017, the team was rebranded as Penn FC. The rebrand served in conjunction with a partnership with Rush Soccer youth development program. Penn FC served Rush Soccer's professional team and the club's most important piece to their extensive network. The team played its home games at FNB Field on City Island. The team's colors were blue, black and grey corresponding to Rush Soccer's branding established in 1997. In December 2019, ahead of the 2020 season, reports noted that the club had ceased operations and no longer had any employees on payroll.

== History ==
=== League ===
==== USL Pro Soccer League – inaugural season (2004) ====
The Harrisburg City Islanders were announced as a new professional soccer team on September 24, 2003, as a member USL Pro Soccer League’s Atlantic Division on the third tier of the American soccer pyramid. As the team prepared for its inaugural season, Bill Becher was named the first head coach of the club and forward David Bascome was signed as the first player. The City Islanders won their first match 5–2 on the road against the Northern Virginia Royals with Steve Fisher scoring the club's first ever goal.

The City Islanders were powerful contenders in the USL second division, finishing second the Atlantic Division and fifth overall in their inaugural season and qualifying for the playoffs. They were eliminated in the Atlantic Division Finals by the Pittsburgh Riverhounds.

==== USL Second Division and USL Pro (2005–2014) ====
The 2005 season saw the City Islanders continue to be contenders in the league, now organized in a single table as the USL Second Division (USL-2), finishing third in the table and qualifying for the playoffs. They were eliminated in the Atlantic Division Finals by the eventual champions, Charlotte Eagles. The season's success was recognized as Bill Becher was named USL-2 Coach of the Year, while Chad Severs was named Rookie of the Year who led the scoring with 13 goals and 5 assists.

In 2006, the club failed to reach the playoffs, but regained form in 2007. The City Islanders would win their first championship in USL Second Division Championship, defeating the Richmond Kickers on penalty kicks. Dustin Bixler was named the match's Most Valuable Player.

The City Islanders qualified for the playoffs in 2008 and 2009 but were unable to recapture the title. Danny Cepero played for Harrisburg on loan from the New York Red Bulls in 2008, and upon returning to New York, became the first goalkeeper in Major League Soccer history to score from open play. In 2009, Ty Shipalane became the second City Islander to win Rookie of the Year and became the first City Islander to jump directly to Major League Soccer after signing with D.C. United at the conclusion of the season.

The 2010 season would be the second time in the club's history missing the playoffs. On March 1, 2010, the City Islanders entered into an agreement to become the official USL affiliate of Major League Soccer's Philadelphia Union. The affiliation would soon have City Islanders defender, Sheanon Williams sign with the Union and become an immediate insertion in the first tier club's starting eleven.

The 2011 season saw the USL Second Division be reorganized into the USL Pro with Harrisburg competing in the National Division. The City Islanders won the USL Pro National Division title over the Rochester Rhinos advancing to the first USL Pro final against the newly formed, and regular-season champion, Orlando City. Similar to the last championship appearance, the City Islanders would play to a draw (2–2) in regulation time, only this time falling on penalty kicks 3–2.

The City Islanders would have successful seasons in 2012 and 2013, but would earn a spot in the USL Pro final during the 2014 season after a dark horse run through the playoffs, having finished in the last remaining qualifier spot. The final was, again, played at a newly formed club, and regular-season champion, Sacramento Republic FC. Sacramento would win the title 2–0, with Harrisburg earning their second runner-up in four seasons.

==== USL and rebrand (2015–2018) ====
Undergoing massive expansion and vying for second division status in the American soccer pyramid, the USL Pro was rebranded as simply "USL." The re-branding and additional teams intended to increase the quality of play and infrastructure throughout the league, as well as provide better player development in cooperation with Major League Soccer. Since the league restructured, the City Islanders have struggled to keep pace, missing out on the playoffs for both the 2015 and 2016 seasons.

On January 5, 2017, the United States Soccer Federation granted USL provisional Division II status; making the 2017 season the first time the City Islanders would compete as a Division II team. Shortly before the 2017 season, George Altirs was announced as new majority owner of the club so as to "stay in Harrisburg and build an international developmental base that is unique and exciting." As majority owner, Altirs "will oversee the technical side of the club, including player and staff selections, transfers, and outside, non-local partnerships for the Harrisburg City Islanders." The ownership addition was intended to allow the City Islanders to keep pace with the growth of the USL.

On November 15, 2017, it was announced that the City Islanders would be rebranded as Penn FC starting with the 2018 season. The rebrand was announced as a focus on player and product development, situating the team as the top of a development pyramid for the existing Rush Soccer program. The rebranding saw wholesale changes with the team's personnel, retaining only five players from the 2017 roster. Bill Becher was appointed technical director, leaving his role as the club's first and only head coach. In February 2017, Raoul Voss was announced as the first head coach for Penn FC. Ahead of the 2018 season, Penn FC made some key signings including the return of former City Islander standouts Ken Tribbett and Lucky Mkosana, and forward Tommy Heinemann.

Penn FC's inaugural season started off with mixed results, going 6-4-7 through their first 17 matches. Conflicts with baseball operations and schedule at FNB Field required the team to have long away stints until a final 9-match home stand. The team's poor away form mid-season carried into the home-stand with Penn FC going 1-2-6 in their remaining 9 matches. The team finished 13th in the Eastern Conference, their lowest position since joining the USL.

==== Hiatus and cessation of operations ====
Prior to the conclusion to the 2018 season, the Penn FC officially announced the team would be on hiatus for the 2019 season and return play in 2020 as part of the newly formed USL League One in the third tier of American soccer. After months of speculation, there had been minimal announcements regarding the team's preparations for entering League One. In December 2019, during the USL Winter Meetings, reports noted that the club had ceased operations and no longer had any employees on payroll after 16 years of professional soccer.

=== U.S. Open Cup ===
Harrisburg also competed in the U.S. Open Cup, where they developed a reputation as "giant killers" for defeating several teams from Major League Soccer. Harrisburg boasts an overall record of 12–5–3 in the competition, including a perfect 5–0 mark against teams from the Premier Development League and 5–6 record against MLS clubs. The City Islanders first competed in the U.S. Open Cup in 2007, defeating two amateur squads before upsetting D.C. United 1–0 to reach the quarterfinals. They subsequently lost to the New England Revolution 1–2, but in 2009 exacted revenge by beating the Revolution 2–1 before losing to D.C. United 1–2 in the quarterfinals. The City Islanders repeated the feat in 2010, knocking off Major League Soccer's New York Red Bulls 1–0 in the round of 16 and claiming a cash prize for advancing furthest of any USL Pro team in the tournament. The City Islanders again dispatched the New England Revolution in the 2012 edition of the U.S. Open Cup, prevailing on penalty kicks after a 3–3 draw in the round of 32. Harrisburg next defeated the Red Bulls 3–1 to advance to the quarterfinals, where they lost to the Philadelphia Union by a 5–2 scoreline. In 2012, the City Islanders again won the cash prize for advancing further than any USL Pro team in the tournament by virtue of a tie-breaker.

=== Friendlies ===
The City Islanders hosted several exhibition matches, or friendlies, against international and top-flight competition. A partnership with D.C. United of Major League Soccer created the "Clash of the Capitals," annual matches between the two capital cities held in 2005–06. In the inaugural edition of the competition in 2005, D.C. United won 1–0 in front of over 4,000 fans at the Skyline Sports Complex. The following year's matchup was staged at Cumberland Valley High School, where 5,133 fans turned out to witness Freddy Adu and United prevail 2–1. That same year included the City Islanders' first international exhibition, as the club defeated Jamaica's Village United F.C. 5–1 at Hersheypark Stadium.

In 2009, the City Islanders played Crystal Palace F.C. of the Football League Championship, England's second division, at Lancaster's Clipper Magazine Stadium. A crowd of 5,099 witnessed the match, a 3–1 Crystal Palace win that included goals by Palace stars Darren Ambrose, Neil Danns, and Freddie Sears. Brandon Swartzendruber scored the lone goal for the City Islanders.

==== Affiliation with Philadelphia Union ====
On March 1, 2010, the City Islanders entered into an agreement to become the official USL affiliate of Major League Soccer's Philadelphia Union. As part of their affiliation, the City Islanders host annual friendly matches against the Philadelphia Union of Major League Soccer. As of the 2014 season, the Islanders have only won one match against their top flight affiliate.

In 2010, the teams played to a 1–1 draw, with Danny Mwanga giving the Union a lead in the 30th minute before an own goal allowed Harrisburg to equalize a minute later. J.T. Noone appeared for both clubs in the match, playing the first half for the City Islanders before switching jerseys and completing the second half for Philadelphia.

The Union prevailed in the 2011 edition by a 5–3 scoreline. The City Islanders carried a 2–0 lead into halftime behind goals by Nelson Becerra and Andrew Welker, but heavy substitutions allowed the Union to demonstrate their superior depth, and they scored five times in thirty minutes before Jose Angulo pegged one back.

With both teams fielding numerous reserves, the City Islanders won the 2012 rematch, which was played at Hersheypark Stadium. Jorge Perlaza and Kai Herdling scored for the Union, while a brace by Garret Pettis and goal by Yann Ekra carried the USL-PRO outfit to the 3–2 victory.

After five years of cooperation, it was announced on August 19, 2015 that the affiliation would dissolve at the conclusion of the 2015 season as the Union would develop their own USL team, Bethlehem Steel FC, in the Lehigh Valley starting in 2016. The final friendly between the two teams as affiliates took place in Lancaster, Pennsylvania in front of a record crowd of 6,546 attendees. The Union won the match 3–1.

The table below summarizes the results of the annual contests between the Islanders and Union.

July 27, 2010 Friendly	Harrisburg City Islanders	1–1	Philadelphia Union	Harrisburg, Pennsylvania
7:00 ET	Harvey 31' (o.g.)	Report	Mwanga 30'	Stadium: Skyline Sports Complex

August 24, 2011 Friendly	Harrisburg City Islanders	3–5	Philadelphia Union	Harrisburg, Pennsylvania
7:00 ET	Becerra 6'; Welker 19'; Angulo 85'	Report	Mapp 48'; Richter 49'; Pfeffer 60'; Torres 76'; Tait 78'	Stadium: Skyline Sports Complex

June 12, 2012 Friendly	Harrisburg City Islanders	3–2	Philadelphia Union	Hershey, Pennsylvania
7:00 pm ET	Pettis 17', 76'; Ekra 55'	Report	Perlaza 45'; Herdling 81'	Stadium: Hersheypark Stadium; Attendance: 820

June 18, 2013 Friendly	Harrisburg City Islanders	2–4	Philadelphia Union	Harrisburg, Pennsylvania
7:00 pm ET	Basso 13' (pen.); Touray 60'	Report	Carroll 4'; Le Toux 19'; Hoppenot 69'; Torres 90'	Stadium: Skyline Sports Complex

August 28, 2014 Friendly	Harrisburg City Islanders	2–3	Philadelphia Union	Harrisburg, Pennsylvania
7:00 p.m. EDT	Barril 22'; Baúque 55'	Report	Le Toux 13'; Fernandes 45'; Fred 75'	Stadium: Skyline Sports Complex; Attendance: 2,558

August 31, 2015 Friendly	Harrisburg City Islanders	1–3	Philadelphia Union	Lancaster, Pennsylvania
7:00 p.m. EDT	Pereira (yellow card) 33'; Jankouskas 44'; Donatelli (yellow card) 75'	Report	White 48'; Maidana 66'; Casey 75'	Stadium: Clipper Magazine Stadium; Attendance: 6,546; Referee: Ryan Dos Reis

== Colors and badge ==
The team's colors were blue and white. The logo can also be adorned with a gold star above it, representing the USL Championship the team won in 2007. The team has since issued two anniversary crests for their 10th and 12th seasons.

In 2016, the City Islanders alternatively dropped "Harrisburg" from the team's title in an attempt to increase the club's footprint in central Pennsylvania.

2003–2017

Alternative logo (2016)

== Stadium ==
For the first 12 seasons, the City Islanders competed at the Skyline Sports Complex. Since the 2016 season at FNB Field on City Island in Harrisburg, Pennsylvania. The stadium has a capacity of 6,187 spectators. The City Islanders also compete at Clipper Magazine Stadium in Lancaster, Pennsylvania which serves as an alternate home ground during the 2016 season.

=== Stadium expansion/upgrade ===
Recognizing the need to modernize the facilities with the growth of the USL, in 2015 the parent company of the Harrisburg City Islanders, the Harrisburg Capital Soccer, Inc. have begun applying for grant funding to facilitate upgrades to the existing complex. The proposed upgrades were anticipated to include increasing capacity to 5,000 seats, dedicated VIP areas, entrance plaza, upgraded concessions, restrooms, indoor locker rooms, state-of-the-art broadcasting booth, and a new scoreboard. New seating is intended to be an upgrade from existing bleachers with a mix of individual bucket seats, ten luxury suites, a VIP deck with seating, and bleacher seats with back supports. This expansion is intended to meet the minimum capacity required by the USSF for a league to compete as Division 2 in the American soccer pyramid.

=== Relocation to FNB Field ===
The 2016 season marked the City Islanders transition from Skyline Sports Complex to FNB Field on City Island in Harrisburg, Pennsylvania. The transition was a result of the collaboration with the current tenants, the Harrisburg Senators, and to keep pace with the stadium standards being implemented by the USL. The team would also share home matches with Clipper Magazine Stadium in Lancaster, Pennsylvania as an effort to expand the Islanders fanbase throughout south central Pennsylvania. From the 2017 season, the Penn FC plays all of their home matches at FNB Field to focus on the Harrisburg area.

Period	Stadium	Location	Capacity
2004–2015	Skyline Sports Complex	City Island, Harrisburg, Pennsylvania	4,000
2016	Clipper Magazine Stadium	Lancaster, Pennsylvania	6,000
2017–2018	FNB Field	City Island, Harrisburg, Pennsylvania	6,187

When Penn FC announced their hiatus for the 2019 season, the decision was largely cited as looking for a more permanent stadium solution. Sharing FNB Field with the Harrisburg Senators proved to be difficult due to scheduling and poor playing conditions because of the transitions between soccer and baseball fields.

== Youth development ==
As the City Islanders, The City Islanders Academy system fielded both boys and girls teams U-9 through U-17, and U20 and U23 adult men's teams. The club also fielded teams that competed in the Super-20 League, a league for players 17 to 20 years of age, operated by the United Soccer Leagues. The academy has also established partnerships with 17 youth soccer clubs across Central Pennsylvania.

The rebranding of the club to Penn FC has also begun the club's partnership with Rush Soccer, an established youth academy system based in Littleton, Colorado representing over 32,000 youth soccer players from 85 clubs around the world. The goal of the partnership was to provide the academy with a professional team to be at the pinnacle of the Rush Soccer development program, drawing from large player pools and international affiliations. Rush soccer became a pioneer by reverse-engineering the pathway from youth soccer to the professional level.

== Supporters groups ==
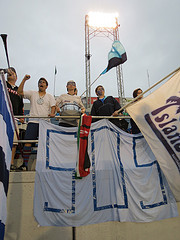
The "SOS" attend the City Islanders vs Union friendly at Hersheypark Stadium.

As the City Islanders, two supporters groups had formed: the City Island Hecklers (founded by "Them Hecklerz"), and the Sons of the Susquehanna (founded by former Cedar Cliff High School students Tyler Knupp, Kris Ortega, Ian Goldinger, and Raymond Stellhorn). The two groups would position themselves behind opposing goals on matchdays. During the City Islanders affiliation with the Philadelphia Union, members of the Sons of Ben (supporters of the Philadelphia Union) also provided support.

=== Capital City Crew ===
Ahead of the 2017 season, the newly formed Capital City Crew became the recognized supporters group of the team.

== Broadcasting and media coverage ==
Most Penn FC home matches were broadcast live on Invica, with tape delay feeds on ABC 27 Weather Channel, Comcast channel 245 and Verizon Fios channel 462. Additionally, many road games were broadcast through USLLive. Michael Bullock covers the team for the Patriot-News, while Derek Meluzio provides commentary and videos from his Upper 90 blog. The column "Confessions of a Soccer Nobody" appears regularly in the Sports' Burger, offering additional coverage and insight.

As of the 2014 season, USL began regularly broadcasting all league matches on the USL YouTube channel. Home match broadcasting is provided live by Inivca where play-by-play announcing covered by Brian Keyser with color commentary by Charlie Gerow.

== Sponsorship ==
Period	Kit Manufacturer	Shirt Sponsor
2007–2014	Adidas	Capital Blue Cross; Snickers
2015–2016	Adidas	Capital Blue Cross; Select Physical Therapy
2017–2018	Capelli Sport	Capelli Sport; Select Physical Therapy

== Staff ==
Position	Staff	Nation
Technical advisor^{1}	Bill Becher	United States
General manager^{2}	Tim Schulz	United States
Head coach	Raoul Voss	Germany
Assistant coach	Rodolfo Correia	Portugal
Goalkeeping coach	Steve Widdowson	United States
Strength and conditioning coach	Denis Clarke	(Republic of Ireland) Ireland
Club president	Tiago Lopes	Portugal
Academy coordinator	Dave Kern	United States

Referenced from HCI coaching staff and front office.
^{1}Bill Becher appointed general manager in February 2016.
^{2}Tim Schulz, Rush Soccer President & CEO, appointed general manager in January 2018.

=== Head coaches ===
- Figures correct as of November 17, 2018. Includes all competitive matches

Coach	From	To	Record				
Coach	From	To	G	W	D	L	Win %
(United States) Bill Becher	September 24, 2003	January 23, 2018	376	152	95	129	40.43
(Germany) Raoul Voss	February 7, 2018	October 13, 2018	36	10	10	16	27.78
Total			412	162	105	145	39.32

== Honors ==
United Soccer Leagues Champions
Winners: 2007
Finalists: 2011, 2014

=== Individual Achievements ===
The following detail individual achievements earn by Penn FC players over the club's history.

United Soccer Leagues Coach of the Year
2005: Bill Becher

USL Rookie of the Year
2005: Chad Severs
2009: Ty Shipalane

USL Championship MVP
2007: Dustin Bixler

USL All-League First Team
2005: Shane Crawford, Sumed Ibrahim
2007: Matt Nelson, Mike Lookingland, Mo Oduor, Brian Ombiji
2009: Dustin Bixler, Ty Shipalane
2010: Dustin Bixler
2013: Sainey Touray

USL All-League Second Team
2005: David Schofield, Chad Severs
2008: Dustin Bixler
2009: Chase Harrison, Chad Severs
2010: Anthony Calvano, Jason Pelletier
2011: José Angulo
2012: Luckymore Mkosana
2013: Luckymore Mkosana, Nick Noble
2014: Matt Bahner
2016: Jose Barril

== Record ==
=== Year-by-year ===
Year	Division	League	Regular season	Playoffs	U.S. Open Cup	Avg. attendance	Leading goal scorer
Harrisburg City Islanders
2004	3	USL Pro Soccer League	2nd, Atlantic	Quarter-finals	did not qualify	1,510	(United States) Matt Tanzini (6)
2005	3	USL Second Division	3rd	Semi-finals	did not qualify	1,604	(United States) Chad Severs (13)
2006	3	USL Second Division	7th	did not qualify	did not qualify	1,781	(United States) Jamel Mitchell (6)
2007	3	USL Second Division	3rd	Champions	Quarter-finals	1,724	(Kenya) Mo Oduor (6)
2008	3	USL Second Division	5th	Quarter-finals	2nd round	1,684	(United States) Ryan Heins (7)
2009	3	USL Second Division	3rd	Semi-finals	Quarter-finals	1,857	(United States) Chad Severs (9)
2010	3	USL Second Division	5th	did not qualify	Quarter-finals	1,666	(United States) Jason Hotchkin (5)
2011	3	USL Pro	2nd, National	Finals	2nd round	1,404	(Colombia) Jose Angulo (9)
2012	3	USL Pro	6th	Quarter-finals	Quarter-finals	1,452	(Zimbabwe) Luckymore Mkosana (7)
2013	3	USL Pro	4th	Quarter-finals	2nd round	1,456	(Zimbabwe) Luckymore Mkosana (13)
2014	3	USL Pro	8th	Finals	4th round	1,941	(United States) Morgan Langley (6) (United States) Jimmy McLaughlin (6) (United States) Robbie Derschang (6)
2015	3	USL	8th, Eastern	did not qualify	3rd round	2,430	(United States) Jason Plumhoff (10)
2016	3	USL	10th, Eastern	did not qualify	4th round	1,622	(Jamaica) Craig Foster (10)
2017	2	USL	11th, Eastern	did not qualify	4th round	2,429	(Ghana) Ropapa Mensah (7)
Penn FC
2018	2	USL	13th, Eastern	did not qualify	3rd round	2,147	(Zimbabwe) Luckymore Mkosana (11)

Referenced from Harrisburg City Islanders club history.

=== Keystone Derby ===
Although they had been rivals and competed against each other in previous seasons, the inaugural Keystone Derby was officially contested between Penn FC and the Pittsburgh Riverhounds in 2015. Pittsburgh went on to win the cup in the first edition of the tournament in a series that saw 28 goals through four matches. The City Islanders would claim their first derby title in 2016.

Year	GP	Win	Loss	Draw	GF	GA	±	Result	Ref.
2015	4	1	3	0	12	16	-4		
2016	3	1	0	2	3	2	+1		
2017	3	0	2	1	0	4	-4		
2018	3	0	1	2	0	2	-2		

Key

- Won
- Lost
