= 2014 Pittsburgh Riverhounds season =

Pittsburgh Riverhounds
2014 season
- Chairman: Jason Kutney
- Manager: Nikola Katic (interim)
- Stadium: Highmark Stadium
- USL Pro: 13th
- U.S. Open Cup: Fourth round
- Top goalscorer: League: José Angulo (8); All: José Angulo (9)
- Highest home attendance: 3,902 (April 12 v. Wilmington)
- Lowest home attendance: 2,005 (June 11 v. Harrisburg)
- Average home league attendance: 2,791

The 2014 Pittsburgh Riverhounds season was the club's fifteenth season of existence. It is the Riverhounds' fourth season playing in the USL Professional Division. It was the second season the Riverhounds played at Highmark Stadium, a 3,500 capacity soccer specific stadium.

== Background ==
After a modestly successful first season at Highmark Stadium, the Riverhounds, aided by investments of new majority owner Terry "Tuffy" Shallenberger, aimed to make headway on last season's 7th-place finish.

== Pre-Season Activity ==
=== October ===
On October 29, the Riverhounds held a press conference to announce the re-signings of two players:

- Reigning USL-Pro MVP José Angulo was re-signed for 2014, with a club option in 2015
- Midfielder Matthew Dallman was re-signed to a new two-year deal

=== November ===
- On November 5, the Riverhounds announced the signing of veteran Joseph Ngwenya from Richmond.
- On November 7, an ad in the Pittsburgh Tribune-Review confirmed the signing of Ghanaian midfielder Anthony Obodai.
- On November 26, the Riverhounds officially formed an affiliate partnership with Houston Dynamo of Major League Soccer, becoming the fifth USL club to have an MLS affiliate. The partnership will be effective immediately, and "will enable the Dynamo to loan a minimum of four MLS-contracted players to Pittsburgh for the 2014 USL PRO season."

=== February ===
- On February 7, the Pittsburgh Tribune-Review announced the re-signings of Mike Seth, Rob Vincent, Seth C'deBaca, Sterling Flunder, Mike Green, and Greg Blum.

=== March ===
- On March 20, the Riverhounds announced the signing of Collins John, a veteran of the Premier League, and MLS.
- On March 26, the team filed for Chapter 11 Bankruptcy Reorganization.

== Competitions ==
=== Preseason ===
February 16, 2014 Preseason	Pittsburgh Riverhounds	2–0	Houston Dynamo Academy	Houston, Texas
4:00 p.m. CST	Cabrilo 68', 85' (pen.)	Report		Stadium: Houston Sports Park

February 19, 2014 Preseason	Pittsburgh Riverhounds	1–4	Houston Dynamo	Houston, Texas
11:00 p.m. CST	Kerr 25'	Report	Cascio 18'; Barnes 28', 59'; Cummings 79'	Stadium: Houston Sports Park

February 22, 2014 Preseason	Pittsburgh Riverhounds	2–3	Houston Baptist Huskies	Houston, Texas
11:00 p.m. CST	Kerr 9', 58'	Report	Lamanna 65'; Kromholtz 79'; Toh 90'	Stadium: Houston Sports Park

March 8, 2014 Preseason	Virginia Cavaliers	2–0	Pittsburgh Riverhounds	Pittsburgh, Pennsylvania
11:00 a.m. EDT	(pen.)			Stadium: Highmark Stadium

March 16, 2014 Preseason	Rochester Rhinos	1–2	Pittsburgh Riverhounds	Pittsburgh, Pennsylvania
3:00 p.m. EDT	Vu 86'	Report	Arteaga 32'; Seth 84'	Stadium: Highmark Stadium

March 18, 2014 Preseason	Pitt Panthers	0–2	Pittsburgh Riverhounds	Pittsburgh, Pennsylvania
7:00 p.m. EDT		Report	Vincent 61'; C'deBaca 81'	Stadium: Highmark Stadium

March 20, 2014 Preseason	Robert Morris Colonials	2–5	Pittsburgh Riverhounds	Pittsburgh, Pennsylvania
7:00 p.m. EDT	17' (pen.); 55'	Report	Angulo 50', 65', 85'; Cabrillo 60'; Vincent 75'	Stadium: Highmark Stadium

March 22, 2014 Preseason	Duquesne Dukes	0–1	Pittsburgh Riverhounds	Pittsburgh, Pennsylvania
7:00 p.m. EDT			Vincent 39'	Stadium: Highmark Stadium

=== USL Pro ===
March 29, 2014 1	Orlando City	1–1	Pittsburgh Riverhounds	Lake Buena Vista, Florida
7:30 pm EDT	Boden 58'	Report	Marshall (yellow card) 34'; Angulo 50'	Stadium: Hess Field 17, ESPN WWOS; Referee: Caleb Mendez

April 5, 2014 2	Richmond Kickers	3–1	Pittsburgh Riverhounds	Richmond, Virginia
5:00 pm EDT	Seaton 19'; Porter 57', 90'	Report	John 82'	Stadium: City Stadium; Attendance: 3,507; Referee: Mark Gorak

April 12, 2014 3	Pittsburgh Riverhounds	3–4	Wilmington Hammerheads	Pittsburgh, Pennsylvania
7:00 pm EDT	Ownby (yellow card) 46'; Angulo 52'; John 67' (red card) 90'; Marshall (yellow card) 72'; Ngwenya (yellow card) 75'; Kerr 86'	Report	Miller 27'; Lovitz 39'; Ochoa 58', 72' (yellow card) 58'; Roberts (yellow card) 67'	Stadium: Highmark Stadium; Attendance: 3,902; Referee: Matthieu Bordeau

April 19, 2014 4	Richmond Kickers	2–2	Pittsburgh Riverhounds	Richmond, Virginia
5:00 pm EDT	Porter 65'; Delicate 77'	Report	Ownby 11'; Arteaga 61'	Stadium: City Stadium; Attendance: 2,523; Referee: Ted Unkle

April 26, 2014 5	Pittsburgh Riverhounds	0–0	Charleston Battery	Pittsburgh, Pennsylvania
6:00 pm EDT	Obodai (yellow card) 20'	Report	vanSchaik (yellow card) 23'; Prince (yellow card) 54'; Lewis (yellow card) 67'	Stadium: Highmark Stadium; Attendance: 2,253; Referee: Charles Murphy

May 9, 2014 6	Pittsburgh Riverhounds	0–1	Orlando City SC	Pittsburgh, Pennsylvania
7:00 pm EDT	Dallman (yellow card) 52'; Obodai (yellow card) 58'	Report	Molino 14'; Ceren (yellow card) 59'; Boden (yellow card) 62'; Turner (yellow card) 64'; Álvarez (yellow card) 70'; Gallardo (yellow card) 78'; Pulis (yellow card) 90+'	Stadium: Highmark Stadium; Attendance: 2,485; Referee: Kevin Terry Jr.

May 17, 2014 7	Pittsburgh Riverhounds	0–1	Rochester Rhinos	Pittsburgh, Pennsylvania
7:00 pm EDT	Kerr (yellow card) 73'	Report	Dixon 41'; Sundly (yellow card) 50'; Mendoza (yellow card) 69'	Stadium: Highmark Stadium; Attendance: 2,705; Referee: Charles Murphy

May 23, 2014 8	Wilmington Hammerheads	5–1	Pittsburgh Riverhounds	Wilmington, North Carolina
7:30 pm EDT	Hamilton 1'; Miller 5'; Ochoa 35'; Arnoux 90'; Heaney 90'		John 62'	Stadium: Legion Stadium; Attendance: 2,074

May 24, 2014 9	Charleston Battery	1–0	Pittsburgh Riverhounds	Charleston, South Carolina
7:30 pm EDT	Sanyang 40'			Stadium: Blackbaud Stadium; Attendance: 5,415

June 1, 2014 10	Pittsburgh Riverhounds	1–1	Harrisburg City Islanders	Pittsburgh, Pennsylvania
6:00 pm EDT	Fekete 12'		McLaughlin 85'	Stadium: Highmark Stadium; Attendance: 2,756

June 7, 2014 11	Rochester Rhinos	2–3	Pittsburgh Riverhounds	Rochester, New York
7:05 pm EDT	Vu 26'; Banks 90'		Fekete 43'; Vincent 75'; Angulo 84'	Stadium: Sahlen's Stadium; Attendance: 5,801

June 11, 2014 12	Pittsburgh Riverhounds	1–3	Harrisburg City Islanders	Pittsburgh, Pennsylvania
	John 6'		McLaughlin 48'; Baúque 63'; Ekra 86'	Stadium: Highmark Stadium; Attendance: 2,005

June 14, 2014 13	Harrisburg City Islanders	0–0	Pittsburgh Riverhounds	Harrisburg, Pennsylvania
				Stadium: Skyline Sports Complex; Attendance: 1,780

June 22, 2014 14	Pittsburgh Riverhounds	1–3	Richmond Kickers	Pittsburgh, Pennsylvania
	Angulo 54'		Spitz 5'; Fekete 11' (o.g.); Delicâte 68'	Stadium: Highmark Stadium; Attendance: 2,644

June 28, 2014 15	Pittsburgh Riverhounds	0–1	Dayton Dutch Lions	Pittsburgh, Pennsylvania
			Garner 18'	Stadium: Highmark Stadium; Attendance: 2,457

July 1, 2014 16	Dayton Dutch Lions	1–2	Pittsburgh Riverhounds	Beavercreek, Ohio
	Schoenfeld 5'		Green 47', 55'	Stadium: Beavercreek High School Stadium; Attendance: 363

July 4, 2014 17	Pittsburgh Riverhounds	2–0	Rochester Rhinos	Pittsburgh, Pennsylvania
	Marshall 51'; Motagalvan 66'			Stadium: Highmark Stadium; Attendance: 3,519

July 12, 2014 18	Oklahoma City Energy FC	2–0	Pittsburgh Riverhounds	Oklahoma City, OK
	Thomas 5'; Delgado 19'			Stadium: Pribil Stadium; Attendance: 3,619

July 17, 2014 19	Pittsburgh Riverhounds	2–0	Charlotte Eagles	Pittsburgh, Pennsylvania
	Kerr 68'; Angulo 81'			Stadium: Highmark Stadium; Attendance: 2,352

July 25, 2014 20	Real Salt Lake Reserves	2–5	Pittsburgh Riverhounds	Sandy, Utah
	Saucedo 8'; Sandoval 28'		Angulo 6' (pen.), 38' (pen.), 45+' (pen.); Vincent 80'; Johnson 84'	Stadium: Rio Tinto Stadium; Attendance: 11,202

July 27, 2014 21	Sacramento Republic FC	5–0	Pittsburgh Riverhounds	Sacramento, California
	Stewart 7', 33'; Lopez 69', 85'; Jahn 84'			Stadium: CalExpo Soccer Stadium; Attendance: 8,000

August 2, 2014 22	Pittsburgh Riverhounds	3–1	LA Galaxy II	Pittsburgh, Pennsylvania
	Ngwenya 30'; Earls 39'; Kerr 89'		Villareal 18'	Stadium: Highmark Stadium; Attendance: 2,243

August 8, 2014 23	Pittsburgh Riverhounds	1–0	Orange County Blues	Pittsburgh, Pennsylvania
	Green 54'			Stadium: Highmark Stadium; Attendance: 2,348

August 16, 2014 24	Arizona United SC	3–1	Pittsburgh Riverhounds	Peoria, Arizona
	Okafor 54'; Top 61'; Stisser 78'		Pridham 87'	Stadium: Peoria Sports Complex; Attendance: 3,408

August 24, 2014 25	Pittsburgh Riverhounds	3–1	FC Dallas Reserves	Pittsburgh, Pennsylvania
	Vincent 20'; Kerr 33'; Green 55'		Span 43'	Stadium: Highmark Stadium; Attendance: 3,219

August 29, 2014 26	Charlotte Eagles	0–1	Pittsburgh Riverhounds	Charlotte, North Carolina
			Cabrillo 76'	Stadium: Dickson Field; Attendance: 550

August 30, 2014 27	Charleston Battery	4–0	Pittsburgh Riverhounds	Charleston, South Carolina
	Kelly 38', 47', 54'; Prince 67'			Stadium: Blackbaud Stadium; Attendance: 4,161

September 6, 2014 28	Pittsburgh Riverhounds	1–2	Arizona United SC	Pittsburgh, Pennsylvania
	Cabrillo 6'		Tan 12', 75'	Stadium: Highmark Stadium; Attendance: 2,718

==== Standings ====
Pos	Team	Pld	W	T	L	GF	GA	GD	Pts
9	Arizona United SC	28	10	5	13	32	47	−15	33 (Note: Arizona was deducted two points for fielding an ineligible player on June 21 against LA Galaxy II.)
10	Oklahoma City Energy FC	28	9	5	14	32	37	−5	32
11	Pittsburgh Riverhounds	28	9	5	14	35	49	−14	32
12	Charlotte Eagles	28	9	4	15	33	40	−7	31
13	Orange County Blues FC	28	9	1	18	31	54	−23	28

Source: USL Pro official standings
Rules for classification: 1) points; 2) goal difference; 3) number of goals scored.

=== U.S. Open Cup ===
May 14, 2014 2	Pittsburgh Riverhounds	3–1	New York Red Bulls (NPSL)	Pittsburgh, Pennsylvania
19:00 ET	Kerr 10'; Angulo 68'; Vincent 81'		Sheridan 12'	Stadium: Highmark Stadium

May 28, 2014 3	Pittsburgh Riverhounds	3–2	RWB Adria	Pittsburgh, Pennsylvania
19:00 ET	Earls 40'; John 80'; Arteaga 112'		Huffman 44'; Bond 62'	Stadium: Highmark Stadium

June 18, 2014 4	Chicago Fire	2–1	Pittsburgh Riverhounds	Bridgeview, Illinois
21:23 CT	Ward 22'; Magee 40'	Report; Box Score	Marshall 42'	Stadium: Toyota Park

== Statistics ==
=== Squad information ===
- Statistics up to date as of 8/29*

No.	Nat.	Player	Birthday	Previous club	2014 USL Pro appearances	2014 USL Pro goals	2014 Open Cup Goals
Goalkeepers
0	(United States)	Greg Blum	April 12, 1989 (age 37)	(United States) Slippery Rock University	3	0	0
1	(United States)	Hunter Gilstrap	April 17, 1983 (age 43)	(United States) Cleveland City Stars	7	0	0
30	(United States)	Michael Lisch	August 30, 1990 (age 36)	(United States) Houston Dynamo	17	0	0
Defenders
3	(United States)	Brian Fekete	April 6, 1991 (age 35)	(United States) Orlando City SC	10	2	0
4	(Croatia)	Nikola Katic	June 1, 1986 (age 40)	(United States) Springfield Demize	0	0	0
5	(United States)	Sterling Flunder	February 14, 1986 (age 40)	(United States) Portland Timbers U23s	23	0	0
8	(United States)	Mike Green	December 25, 1989 (age 36)	(United States) New Mexico Lobos	25	4	0
15	(United States)	Andrew Marshall	January 17, 1984 (age 42)	(United States) Harrisburg City Islanders	19	1	1
21	(United States)	Anthony Arena	August 3, 1990 (age 36)	(United States) Houston Dynamo	14	0	0
26	(United States)	Andrew Ribeiro	October 22, 1990 (age 35)	(United States) Chivas USA	5	0	0
Midfielders
2	(England)	Rob Vincent	October 26, 1990 (age 35)	(United States) University of Charleston	26	3	1
9	(Canada)	Miroslav Čabrilo	June 6, 1992 (age 34)	(United States) Robert Morris Colonials	10	1	0
10	(Scotland)	Kevin Kerr	January 12, 1989 (age 37)	(Germany) SC Wiedenbrück 2000	22	4	1
11	(United States)	Alfonso Motagalvan	February 11, 1987 (age 39)	(United States) Fort Lauderdale Strikers	17	1	0
13	(Zimbabwe)	Joseph Ngwenya	March 30, 1981 (age 45)	(United States) Richmond Kickers	20	1	0
14	(United States)	Seth C'deBaca	April 28, 1988 (age 38)	(United States) D.C. United U-23	17	0	0
16	(Republic of Ireland)	Danny Earls	April 22, 1989 (age 37)	(United States) Rochester Rhinos	25	1	1
20	(United States)	Matthew Dallman	March 9, 1985 (age 41)	(Germany) Sportfreunde Siegen	26	0	0
22	(United States)	Brian Ownby	June 16, 1990 (age 36)	(United States) Houston Dynamo	5	1	0
23	(Ghana)	Anthony Obodai	August 6, 1982 (age 44)	(United States) Arizona United SC	16	0	0
Forwards
6	(Canada)	Mackenzie Pridham	August 13, 1990 (age 36)	(United States) Minnesota United FC	5	1	0
7	(Jamaica)	Jason Johnson	October 9, 1990 (age 35)	(United States) Houston Dynamo	11	1	0
12	(United States)	Mike Seth	September 20, 1987 (age 38)	(United States) Colorado Rapids U-23	7	0	0
17	(Colombia)	Jhonny Arteaga	November 24, 1986 (age 39)	(United States) New York Red Bulls	8	1	1
18	(Colombia)	José Angulo	January 13, 1988 (age 38)	(United States) New York Red Bulls	21	8	1
25	(Netherlands)	Collins John	October 17, 1985 (age 40)	(Poland) Piast Gliwice	11	4	1
26	(United States)	Bryan Salazar	October 17, 1994 (age 31)	(United States) Houston Dynamo	1	0	0

== Transfers ==
=== In ===
Squad #	Position	Player	Transferred From	Date	Source
13	FW	(Zimbabwe) Joseph Ngwenya	(United States) Richmond Kickers	November 5, 2013	
23	MF	(Ghana) Anthony Obodai	(United States) Phoenix FC	November 7, 2013	
3	DF	(United States) Brian Fekete	(United States) Orlando City	March 3, 2014	
25	FW	(Netherlands) Collins John	(Poland) Piast Gliwice	March 20, 2014	

=== Out ===
Squad #	Position	Player	Transferred To	Date	Source
6	MF	(United States) Rich Costanzo	Retired		
13	MF	(United States) Louie Rolko	Retired		

=== Loan in ===
Squad #	Position	Player	Loaned From	Date	Source
7	FW	(Jamaica) Jason Johnson	(United States) Houston Dynamo	March 24, 2014	
21	DF	(United States) Anthony Arena	(United States) Houston Dynamo	March 24, 2014	
26	FW	(United States) Bryan Salazar	(United States) Houston Dynamo	March 24, 2014	
22	MF	(United States) Brian Ownby	(United States) Houston Dynamo	April 4, 2014	
30	GK	(United States) Michael Lisch	(United States) Houston Dynamo	April 4, 2014	
6	FW	(Canada) Mackenzie Pridham	(United States) Minnesota United	July 21, 2014	
