= 2015 Pittsburgh Riverhounds season =

Pittsburgh Riverhounds
2015 season
- Chairman: Richard Nightingale
- Manager: Mark Steffens
- Stadium: Highmark Stadium
- USL Pro: N/A
- U.S. Open Cup: N/A
- Top goalscorer: League: Rob Vincent (18); All: Rob Vincent (21)
- Highest home attendance: League: 4,297 (August 15 vs. Charlotte); All: 3,988 (June 17 vs. D.C. United)
- Lowest home attendance: 995 (Apr 19 vs. Louisville)
- Average home league attendance: League: 2,500; All: 2,213

The 2015 Pittsburgh Riverhounds season was the club's sixteenth season of existence. It is the Riverhounds' fifth season playing in the United Soccer League (formerly USL Pro), and the club's third season hosting matches at soccer-specific Highmark Stadium.

== Pre-Season Activity ==
On December 17, 2014, the club announced the hiring of former Charlotte Eagles manager Mark Steffens as their new head coach. In the same press conference, it was announced that 2014's interim head coach Nikola Katic was retained as assistant coach, and that Richard Nightingale, formerly of Umbro, would be the team's new president. It was also announced that the Riverhounds had ended their previous affiliation with MLS's Houston Dynamo.

== Competitions ==
=== Preseason ===
March 1, 2015 Preseason	Pittsburgh Riverhounds	Cancelled	Marshall Thundering Herd	Pittsburgh, Pennsylvania
2:00 p.m. CST				Stadium: Highmark Stadium

March 4, 2015 Preseason	Pittsburgh Riverhounds	Cancelled	Pittsburgh Panthers	Pittsburgh, Pennsylvania
6:00 p.m. CST		Report		Stadium: Highmark Stadium

March 7, 2015 Preseason	Pittsburgh Riverhounds	2–0	Western Illinois Leathernecks	Pittsburgh, Pennsylvania
2:00 p.m. CST	Moloto 60'; Vincent 85'	Report		Stadium: Highmark Stadium

March 8, 2015 Preseason	Pittsburgh Riverhounds	3–0	Army Black Knights	Pittsburgh, Pennsylvania
2:00 p.m. CST	Kerr 56'; Vincent 68', 74'	Report		Stadium: Highmark Stadium

March 13, 2015 Preseason	Pittsburgh Riverhounds	4–0	Duquesne Dukes	Pittsburgh, Pennsylvania
1:00 p.m. CST	Čabrilo 6', 45'; Kerr 55'; Eze 76'	Report		Stadium: Highmark Stadium

March 15, 2015 Preseason	Pittsburgh Riverhounds	1–1	Akron Zips	Pittsburgh, Pennsylvania
1:00 p.m. CST	Kerr (yellow card) , (goal) 45'; Okiomah (yellow card); Moloto (yellow card) 55'		Dakwar 15'; Souto (yellow card) 78'; Laryea (yellow card) 84'	Stadium: Highmark Stadium

March 21, 2015 Preseason	Pittsburgh Riverhounds	5–1	Charleston Golden Eagles	Pittsburgh, Pennsylvania
7:00 p.m. CST	Vincent 56', 62', 70'; Russell; Čabrilo	Report	Antonio	Stadium: Highmark Stadium

=== USL Pro ===
==== Standings ====
Pos	Team	Pld	W	D	L	GF	GA	GD	Pts	Qualification
3	Charleston Battery	28	12	10	6	43	28	+15	46	First round
4	New York Red Bulls II	28	12	6	10	46	45	+1	42	First round
5	Pittsburgh Riverhounds	28	11	8	9	53	42	+11	41	First round
6	Richmond Kickers	28	10	11	7	41	35	+6	41	First round
7	Charlotte Independence	28	10	10	8	38	35	+3	40	

Source: 2015 USL schedule
Rules for classification: 1) head-to-head; 2) total wins; 3) total goal differential; 4) total goals scored; 5) disciplinary points; 6) away goals scored; 7) away goal differential; 8) home goals scored; 9) home goal differential; 10) coin toss or drawing of lots

==== Match results ====
March 28, 2015 1	Pittsburgh Riverhounds	5–2	Harrisburg City Islanders	Pittsburgh, Pennsylvania
7:30 pm EDT	Vincent 5', 90+'; Kerr 11', 52', 78'; Earls (yellow card) 40'; Arena (yellow card) 62'	Report	Pfeffer 22'; Pettis 86'	Stadium: Highmark Stadium; Attendance: 2,244; Referee: Charles Murphy

April 4, 2015 2	Pittsburgh Riverhounds	1–2	Rochester Rhinos	Pittsburgh, Pennsylvania
7:30 pm EDT	Arena (yellow card) 38'; Touloute 49'; Earls (yellow card) 68'	Report	McMahon (yellow card) 24'; Walls 28'; Volesky (yellow card) 45+'; Dixon 51'; Silva (yellow card) 78'	Stadium: Highmark Stadium; Attendance: 2,274; Referee: Vito Testa, Jr.

April 11, 2015 3	Saint Louis FC	1–1	Pittsburgh Riverhounds	Fenton, Missouri
7:30 pm EDT	Barklage 44'; Musa (yellow card) 58'	Report	Earls (yellow card) 34'; Dantas 73'; Okai (yellow card) 82'	Stadium: St. Louis Soccer Park; Attendance: 5,280; Referee: Nima Saghafi

April 19, 2015 4	Pittsburgh Riverhounds	1–1	Louisville City FC	Pittsburgh, Pennsylvania
3:30 pm EDT	Okiomah 38'	Report	Guzman (yellow card) 90'; Dacres 92'	Stadium: Highmark Stadium; Attendance: 995; Referee: Tori Penso

April 25, 2015 5	Pittsburgh Riverhounds	5–1	Toronto FC II	Pittsburgh, Pennsylvania
7:00 pm EDT	Kerr 41' (pen.); Vincent 56', 68'; Earls 72'; Pasher 90'	Report	Babouli 17'; Robertson (red card) 41'	Stadium: Highmark Stadium; Attendance: 2,241; Referee: Matthew Kreitzer

May 3, 2015 6	New York Red Bulls II	3–2	Pittsburgh Riverhounds	Harrison, New Jersey
7:00 pm EDT	Okiomah 6' (o.g.); Sanchez 66'; Wallace 90+4'	Report	Vincent 8', 64'; Dallman (yellow card) 31'; Arena (yellow card) 72'	Stadium: Red Bull Arena; Attendance: 398; Referee: Ernie Constantine

May 9, 2015 7	Charleston Battery	3–1	Pittsburgh Riverhounds	Charleston, South Carolina
7:00 pm EDT	Prince 13'; Kelly 65'; Marini 73'	Report	Čabrilo 81'; Hunt (yellow card) 90'	Stadium: Blackbaud Stadium; Attendance: 3,126; Referee: Mark Sauro

May 16, 2015 8	Pittsburgh Riverhounds	1–1	Richmond Kickers	Pittsburgh, Pennsylvania
7:00 pm EDT	Arena 56'; Okai (yellow card) 67'; Moloto (yellow card) 90+'	Report	Ownby 24', (yellow card) 85'; Jeffrey (yellow card) 90+'	Stadium: Highmark Stadium; Attendance: 3,622; Referee: Donovan Noocha

May 23, 2015 9	Richmond Kickers	1–2	Pittsburgh Riverhounds	Richmond, Virginia
7:00 pm EDT	Sekyere (yellow card) 24'; Asante (yellow card) 35'; Delicâte 56'; Worra (yellow card) 88'	Report	Moloto 12'; Čabrilo 18'; Kerr (yellow card) 26'	Stadium: City Stadium; Attendance: 2,868; Referee: Matthew Franz

May 30, 2015 10	Pittsburgh Riverhounds	6–5	Harrisburg City Islanders	Pittsburgh, Pennsylvania
7:00 pm EDT	Vincent 48', 90+'; Soumah 52', (yellow card) 90+'; Earls 81', 90'; Kerr 90+', (yellow card) 90+'	Report	Ekra 28'; DiPrima 37'; Barril 38'; Plumhoff 56'; Pettis 86'	Stadium: Highmark Stadium; Attendance: 2,792; Referee: John Douglas

June 6, 2015 11	Pittsburgh Riverhounds	1–1	Saint Louis FC	Pittsburgh, Pennsylvania
1:00 pm EDT	Okai (yellow card) 47'; Vincent 72' (pen.); Russell (yellow card) 89'	Report	Ambersley (yellow card) 39'; Pais (yellow card) 72'; Lynch 80'	Stadium: Highmark Stadium; Attendance: 1,257; Referee: David Mon

June 13, 2015 12	Charlotte Independence	2–1	Pittsburgh Riverhounds	Rock Hill, South Carolina
7:00 pm EDT	Alvarez 52'; Herrera 65' (pen.); Jérôme (yellow card) 68'	Report	Earls (yellow card) 42' (yellow-red card) 65'; Moloto 45+'; Vincent (yellow card) 83'	Stadium: Eagle Field; Attendance: 1,271

June 20, 2015 13	Pittsburgh Riverhounds	1–0	FC Montreal	Pittsburgh, Pennsylvania
1:00 pm EDT	Kerr 79'	Report	Gagnon-Laparé (yellow card) 34'	Stadium: Highmark Stadium; Attendance: 1,015

June 27, 2015 14	Rochester Rhinos	1–0	Pittsburgh Riverhounds	Rochester, New York
7:05 pm EDT	Walls 79' (pen.)	Report	Hunt (yellow card) 53' (yellow-red card) 90+'; Earls (yellow card) 81'; Arena (yellow card) 90+'	Stadium: Sahlen's Stadium; Attendance: 6,704; Referee: Jamie Herrerea

July 4, 2015 15	Pittsburgh Riverhounds	3–0	New York Red Bulls II	Pittsburgh, Pennsylvania
7:00 pm EDT	Vincent 42', 82'; Kerr (yellow card) 55'; Pasher 74'	Report		Stadium: Highmark Stadium; Attendance: 3,122; Referee: Brandon Artis

July 8, 2015 16	Toronto FC II	0–2	Pittsburgh Riverhounds	Vaughan, Ontario
8:00 pm EDT		Summary	Kerr 9'; Earls (yellow card) 29'; Russell (yellow card) 82'; Arena 90'	Stadium: Ontario Soccer Centre; Attendance: 867; Referee: (Canada) Justin Tasev

July 12, 2015 17	FC Montreal	4–2	Pittsburgh Riverhounds	Montreal, Quebec
4:00 pm EDT	Jackson-Hamel 7' 89'; Dominguez 47'; Riggi 71'; Jems Geffrard (yellow card) 90'	Summary	Živanović 14'; Vincent 56' (pen.)	Stadium: Stade Saputo; Attendance: 191; Referee: (Canada) Chris Grabas

July 18, 2015 18	Pittsburgh Riverhounds	1–2	Louisville City FC	Pittsburgh, Pennsylvania
7:00 pm EDT	Vincent (yellow card) 17'; Kerr 20'	Summary	Rasmussen 15'; Fondy 66'	Stadium: Highmark Stadium; Attendance: 3,638; Referee: (United States) John Douglas

July 26, 2015 19	Harrisburg City Islanders	4–3	Pittsburgh Riverhounds	Harrisburg, Pennsylvania
6:30 pm EDT	Plumhoff 42' (yellow card) 44' (goal) 90+1'; José Barril (yellow card) 64' (yellow-red card); Foster 70' 80'	Summary	Soumah 7'; Arena (yellow card) 10'; Vincent 21' (pen.) (yellow card) 45'; Johnson 62' (o.g.)	Stadium: Skyline Sports Complex; Attendance: 2,022; Referee: (United States) Ryan Dos Reis

August 1, 2015 20	Pittsburgh Riverhounds	3–0	Wilmington Hammerheads FC	Pittsburgh, Pennsylvania
7:00 pm EDT	Vincent 20' 85' 90'; Brown (yellow card) 87'	Summary	Godelman (yellow card) 22'	Stadium: Highmark Stadium; Attendance: 2,807; Referee: (United States) Darth Newman

August 8, 2015 21	Toronto FC II	1–3	Pittsburgh Riverhounds	Vaughan, Ontario
8:00 pm EDT	Kaye (yellow card) 81'; Raheem Edwards 90+3'	Summary	Vincent 11'; Moloto 30'; Dallman (yellow card) 66'; Čabrilo (yellow card) 74' (goal) 79'	Stadium: Ontario Soccer Centre; Referee: (Canada) Geoff Gamble

August 15, 2015 22	Pittsburgh Riverhounds	1–1	Charlotte Independence	Pittsburgh, Pennsylvania
7:00 pm EDT	Moloto 39'; Kerr (yellow card) 43'	Summary	Badji (red card) 40'; Finley 85'; DelPiccolo (yellow card) 85'	Stadium: Highmark Stadium; Attendance: 4,297; Referee: (United States) Jaroslaw Werel

August 22, 2015 23	Charlotte Independence	2–1	Pittsburgh Riverhounds	Charlotte, North Carolina
7:00 pm EDT	Jackson 7'; Zahorski (yellow card) 34'; Martínez 38' (yellow card) 61'; Finley (red card) 90'	Summary	Moloto (yellow card) 34'; Vincent (yellow card) 86'; Hunt 89'; Newman (yellow card) 90'; Earls (red card) 90'	Stadium: Ramblewood Soccer Complex; Attendance: 1,584; Referee: (United States) Jeremy Smith

August 29, 2015 24	Louisville City FC	0–1	Pittsburgh Riverhounds	Louisville, Kentucky
7:30 pm EDT	Guzman (yellow card) 30'; Rasmussen (yellow card) 61'	Summary	Vincent (yellow card) 17' (goal) 44' (pen.); Hunt (yellow card) 43'	Stadium: Louisville Slugger Field; Attendance: 8,414

September 5, 2015 25	Pittsburgh Riverhounds	1–1	Charleston Battery	Pittsburgh, Pennsylvania
7:00 pm EDT	Kerr 52'; Okiomah (yellow card) 69'; Earls (yellow card) 84'	Summary	Chang 90'	Stadium: Highmark Stadium; Attendance: 2,199; Referee: (United States) Bernhard Hosu

September 12, 2015 26	Wilmington Hammerheads	1–1	Pittsburgh Riverhounds	Wilmington, North Carolina
7:00 pm EDT	Campbell 15'; Ackley (yellow card) 39'; Cole (yellow card) 57'	Summary	Flunder (red card) 53'; Kerr (yellow card) 67'; Vini Dantas 70'	Stadium: Legion Stadium; Attendance: 2,617; Referee: (United States) Dustin Thorne

September 16, 2015 27	Pittsburgh Riverhounds	1–1	Rochester Rhinos	Pittsburgh, Pennsylvania
7:00 pm EDT	Moloto 69'	Summary	Volesky 83'	Stadium: Highmark Stadium; Attendance: 2,499; Referee: (United States) Guido Gonzalez

September 19, 2015 28	Harrisburg City Islanders	1–2	Pittsburgh Riverhounds	Harrisburg, Pennsylvania
7:00 pm EDT	Hoppenot 75'	Summary	Moloto 34'; Kerr 35'	Stadium: Skyline Sports Complex; Attendance: 2,388; Referee: (United States) Luis Guardia

=== U.S. Open Cup ===
May 20, 2015 Second round	Pittsburgh Riverhounds (Pennsylvania)	3–0	West Virginia Chaos	Pittsburgh, Pennsylvania
7:00 pm EDT	Vincent 9'; Moloto 10'; Earls (yellow card) 64'; Kerr 87'	Report	Lavender (yellow card) 44'	Stadium: Highmark Stadium; Attendance: 1,500

May 27, 2015 Third round	Pittsburgh Riverhounds (Pennsylvania)	1–0	(Florida) Tampa Bay Rowdies	Pittsburgh, Pennsylvania
7:00 pm EDT	Vincent 90+1'	Report	Sweat (yellow card) 15'; Hernández (yellow card) 81'	Stadium: Highmark Stadium; Attendance: 1,500; Referee: Charles Murphy

June 17, 2015 Fourth round	Pittsburgh Riverhounds (Pennsylvania)	1–3 (a.e.t.)	(Washington, D.C.) D.C. United	Pittsburgh, Pennsylvania
7:00 pm EDT	Vincent 24' (pen.); Flunder (yellow card) 41'	PGH Report; MLS Report	Coria 8'; Arrieta (yellow card) 90+2'; Opare 92'; DeLeon 104'	Stadium: Highmark Stadium; Attendance: 3,988; Referee: Marcos DeOliveira

== Statistics ==
=== Squad information ===
No.	Nat.	Player	Birthday	Previous club	2015 USL Pro appearances	2015 USL Pro goals	2015 Open Cup Goals
Goalkeepers
13	(Jamaica)	Ryan Thompson	January 17, 1985 (age 41)	(United States) Tampa Bay Rowdies	2	0	0
24	(United States)	Ryan Hulings	July 19, 1991 (age 35)	(United States) Baldwin Wallace University	0	0	0
30	(United States)	Calle Brown	January 1, 1990 (age 36)	(United States) University of Virginia	0	0	0
Defenders
3	(United States)	Anthony Arena	August 3, 1990 (age 36)	(United States) Houston Dynamo	2	0	0
5	(United States)	Sterling Flunder	February 14, 1986 (age 40)	(United States) Portland Timbers U23s	2	0	0
8	(United States)	Mike Green	December 25, 1989 (age 36)	(United States) New Mexico Lobos	2	0	0
17	(United States)	Drew Russell	December 28, 1990 (age 35)	(United States) Charlotte Eagles	0	0	0
21	(United States)	Fejiro Okiomah	November 10, 1990 (age 36)	(United States) Indy Eleven	2	0	0
11	(Canada)	Tyler Pasher	April 27, 1994 (age 32)	(United States) Lansing United	0	0	0
19	(United States)	Willie Hunt	September 15, 1987 (age 39)	(United States) Tampa Bay Rowdies	2	0	0
25	(United States)	Jereme Raley	July 16, 1992 (age 34)	(United States) University of Maryland, College Park	0	0	0
Midfielders
6	(England)	Rob Vincent	October 26, 1990 (age 36)	(United States) University of Charleston	2	2	0
7	(Ghana)	Stephen Okai	September 27, 1989 (age 37)	(United States) Orange County Blues FC	2	0	0
10	(Scotland)	Kevin Kerr	January 12, 1989 (age 37)	(Germany) SC Wiedenbrück 2000	2	3	0
12	(United States)	Anthony Virgara	July 17, 1991 (age 35)	(United States) Pittsburgh Riverhounds U23	1	0	0
14	(United States)	Seth C'deBaca	April 28, 1988 (age 38)	(United States) D.C. United U-23	0	0	0
16	(Republic of Ireland)	Danny Earls	April 22, 1989 (age 37)	(United States) Rochester Rhinos	2	0	0
20	(United States)	Matthew Dallman	March 9, 1985 (age 41)	(Germany) Sportfreunde Siegen	0	0	0
22	(South Africa)	Lebogang Moloto	December 27, 1992 (age 33)	(United States) Des Moines Menace	2	0	0
23	(United States)	Nick Kolarac	May 10, 1992 (age 34)	(United States) Michigan Bucks	0	0	0
Forwards
9	(Canada)	Miroslav Čabrilo	June 6, 1992 (age 34)	(United States) Robert Morris Colonials	2	0	0
15	(United States)	Kene Eze	January 21, 1992 (age 34)	(United States) Jersey Express S.C.	1	0	0
28	(Brazil)	Vini Dantas	September 14, 1989 (age 37)	(United States) Baltimore Blast	2	0	0
4	(Haiti)	Max Touloute	April 27, 1990 (age 36)	(United States) Missouri Comets	1	1	0
18	(Germany)	Jeffrey Kyei	October 17, 1989 (age 37)	(United States) California University of Pennsylvania	1	0	0

== Transfers ==
=== In ===
Squad #	Position	Player	Transferred from	Date	Source
–	GK	(Jamaica) Ryan Thompson	(United States) Tampa Bay Rowdies	January 22, 2015	
–	MF	(Ghana) Stephen Okai	(United States) Orange County Blues FC	January 22, 2015	
21	MF	(United States) Anthony Arena	(United States) Houston Dynamo	January 22, 2015	
–	DF	(United States) Drew Russell	(United States) Charlotte Eagles	February 11, 2015	
–	FW	(United States) Kene Eze	(United States) Jersey Express S.C.	February 25, 2015	

=== Out ===
Squad #	Position	Player	Transferred To	Date	Source
23	MF	(Ghana) Anthony Obodai	(Sweden) Ånge IF	January 7, 2015	
1	GK	(United States) Hunter Gilstrap	(United States) Carolina RailHawks	January 8, 2015	
18	FW	(Colombia) José Angulo	(United States) Fort Lauderdale Strikers	February 10, 2015	
