= List of Pittsburgh Riverhounds SC seasons =

The American soccer club Pittsburgh Riverhounds SC competes in the USL Championship, the second division of American soccer, previously known as USL and USL Pro. The following is a complete list of seasons for the club, including team and individual statistics for all competitive competitions that the club has partaken in.

== Key ==
Key to competitions

- USL Championship (USLC) – The second division of soccer in the United States, established in 2010 and previously known as USL and USL Pro. The Championship was the third division of American soccer from its founding until its elevation to second division status in 2017.
- USL Second Division (USL-2) – The third division of soccer in the United States from 2005 through 2009.
- USL Pro Soccer League (USL PSL) – The third division of soccer in the United States from 2003 through 2004, now defunct.
- A-League – The second division of soccer in the United States from 1995 through 2004, now defunct.
- U.S. Open Cup (USOC) – The premier knockout cup competition in US soccer, first contested in 1914.
- CONCACAF Champions League (CCL) – The premier competition in North American soccer since 1962. It went by the name of Champions' Cup until 2008.

Key to colors and symbols

1st or W	Winners
2nd or RU	Runners-up
Last	Wooden Spoon
♦	League Golden Boot
	Highest average attendance

Key to league record

- Season = The year and article of the season
- Div = Level on pyramid
- League = League name
- Pld = Games played
- W = Games won
- L = Games lost
- D = Games drawn
- GF = Goals scored
- GA = Goals against
- Pts = Points
- PPG = Points per game
- Conf = Conference position
- Overall = League position

Key to cup record

- DNE = Did not enter
- DNQ = Did not qualify
- NH = Competition not held or canceled
- QR = Qualifying round
- PR = Preliminary round
- GS = Group stage
- R1 = First round
- R2 = Second round
- R3 = Third round
- R4 = Fourth round
- R5 = Fifth round
- QF = Quarterfinals
- SF = Semifinals
- RU = Runners-up
- W = Winners

== Seasons ==
Season	League											Position		Playoffs	USOC	USL Cup	Continental / Other	Average attendance	Top goalscorer(s)	
Season	Div	League	Pld	W	L	D	GF	GA	GD	Pts	PPG	Conf.	Overall	Playoffs	USOC	USL Cup	Continental / Other	Average attendance	Name(s)	Goals
1999	2	A-League	28	16	12	0	63	43	+20	48	1.71	5th	10th	QF	DNE	Inexistent	Ineligible	4,178	(United States) Phil Karn	13
2000	2	A-League	28	10	14	4	41	43	−2	34	1.21	11th	19th	DNQ	R2	Inexistent	Ineligible	3,808	(Saint Lucia) David Flavius	11
2001	2	A-League	26	10	12	4	39	39	0	34	1.31	3rd	13th	QF	QF	Inexistent	Ineligible	3,226	(Saint Lucia) David Flavius	9
2002	2	A-League	28	8	15	5	39	44	−5	29	1.04	8th	14th	DNQ	DNQ	Inexistent	Ineligible	2,274	(Saint Lucia) David Flavius (Brazil) Thiago Martins	8
2003	2	A-League	28	15	9	4	50	41	+9	49	1.75	4th	8th	DNQ	R3	Inexistent	Ineligible	1,783	(Brazil) Thiago Martins	23 ♦
2004	3	USL PSL	20	17	2	1	48	17	+31	52	2.60	1st	1st	SF	DNQ	Inexistent	Ineligible	1,475	(Canada) Said Ali	17
2005	3	USL-2	20	6	11	3	32	25	+7	21	1.05	N/A	7th	DNQ	R1	Inexistent	Ineligible	2,236	(Saint Lucia) David Flavius	8
2006	3	USL-2	20	8	6	6	27	20	+7	30	1.50	N/A	3rd	SF	R1	Inexistent	Ineligible	2,232	(Saint Lucia) David Flavius	7
2007	On Hiatus																			
2008	3	USL-2	20	4	10	6	25	37	−12	18	0.90	N/A	8th	DNQ	R2	Inexistent	Ineligible	1,258	(South Africa) Thabiso Khumalo	6
2009	3	USL-2	20	6	10	4	18	27	−9	22	1.10	N/A	8th	DNQ	R1	Inexistent	DNQ	1,178	(Guyana) Randolph Jerome	6
2010	3	USL-2	20	7	8	5	27	20	+7	29	1.45	N/A	3rd	SF	R2	Inexistent	DNQ	941	(United States) Chad Severs	6
2011	3	USL Pro	24	7	11	6	23	32	−9	27	1.13	4th	10th	QF	R2	Inexistent	DNQ	1,127	(United States) Jeremy Deighton	7
2012	3	USL Pro	24	4	15	5	20	39	−19	17	0.71	N/A	10th	DNQ	R2	Inexistent	DNQ	984	(United States) Matt Kassel	6
2013	3	USL Pro	26	10	8	8	36	33	+3	38	1.46	N/A	7th	QF	R2	Inexistent	DNQ	3,273	(Colombia) José Angulo	15 ♦
2014	3	USL Pro	28	9	14	5	35	49	−14	32	1.14	N/A	11th	DNQ	R4	Inexistent	DNQ	2,686	(Colombia) José Angulo	9
2015	3	USL	28	11	9	8	53	42	+11	41	1.46	5th	11th	R1	R4	Inexistent	DNQ	2,630	(England) Rob Vincent	21
2016	3	USL	30	6	17	7	31	50	−19	25	0.83	13th	27th	DNQ	R2	Inexistent	DNQ	2,494	(United States) Corey Hertzog	13
2017	2	USL	32	8	12	12	33	42	−9	36	1.13	13th	23rd	DNQ	R2	Inexistent	DNQ	2,639	(United States) Corey Hertzog	14
2018	2	USL	34	15	5	14	47	26	+21	59	1.74	3rd	8th	R1	R3	Inexistent	DNQ	2,401	(Jamaica) Neco Brett	15
2019	2	USLC	34	19	4	11	58	30	+28	68	2.00	1st	2nd	QF	R4	Inexistent	DNQ	3,729	(Jamaica) Neco Brett	19
2020	2	USLC	16	11	4	1	39	10	+29	34	2.13	3rd	5th	R1	NH	Inexistent	DNQ	N/A	(Ghana) Ropapa Mensah	6
2021	2	USLC	32	17	8	7	52	34	+18	58	1.63	5th	7th	R1	NH	Inexistent	DNQ	3,132	(United States) Russell Cicerone	16
2022	2	USLC	34	16	9	9	50	38	+12	57	1.32	5th	7th	QF	R3	Inexistent	DNQ	3,934	(United States) Russell Cicerone	15
2023	2	USLC	34	19	5	10	50	29	+21	67	1.97	1st	1st	R1	QF	Inexistent	DNQ	5,012	(Cameroon) Albert Dikwa	21 ♦
2024	2	USLC	34	12	10	12	41	28	+13	48	1.41	7th	12th	R1	Ro32	Ineligible	DNQ	5,048	(Uganda) Edward Kizza	12
2025	2	USLC	30	12	10	8	32	28	+4	44	1.46	4th	7th	W	Ro16	GS	DNQ	4,965	(Sierra Leone) Augustine Williams	9
Total	–	–	698	283	247	168	1009	866	+143	1017	1.46	–	–	1	–	–	—	–	(Saint Lucia) David Flavius	62

1. Avg. attendance only includes statistics from regular season matches.
2. Top goalscorer(s) includes all goals scored in the regular season, League Playoffs, U.S. Open Cup, CONCACAF Champions League, FIFA Club World Cup, and other competitive matches.
3. Points and PPG have been adjusted from non-traditional to traditional scoring systems for seasons prior to 2003 to more effectively compare historical team performance across seasons.

== See also ==
- Pittsburgh Riverhounds SC records and results
