= Pittsburgh Riverhounds SC records and results =

Pittsburgh Riverhounds SC is an American professional soccer team based in Pittsburgh, Pennsylvania, founded in 1998 and beginning play in 1999.

Saint Lucian international David Flavius currently holds the club records for most appearances and goals which he set over his eight seasons with the Riverhounds between 1999 and 2006.

The list encompasses the player statistics and records and notable match results since the club's founding.

== Player records ==
=== Appearances ===
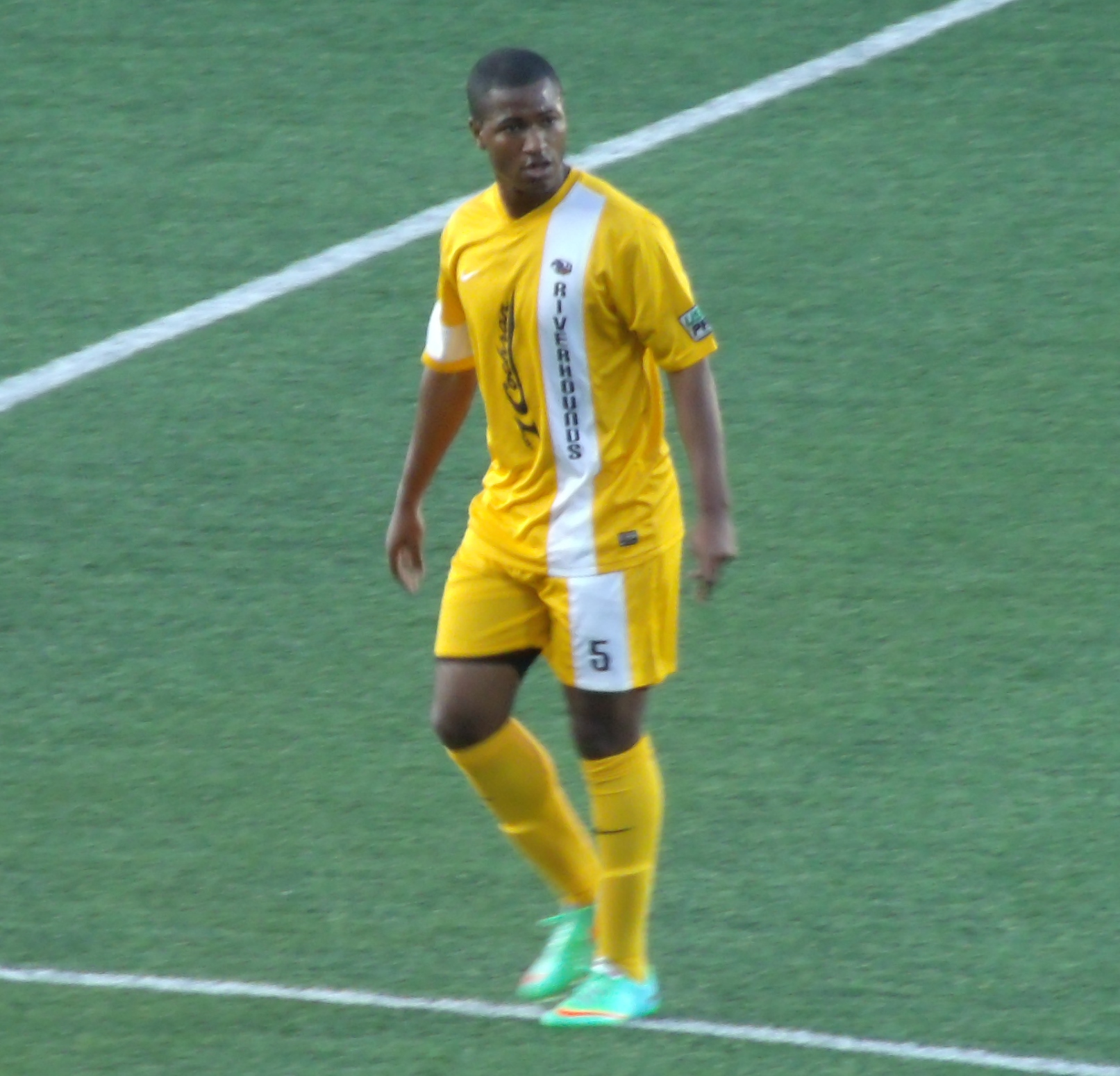
Sterling Flunder ranks sixth all-time with 135 appearances.

As of January 29, 2024

	Name	Years	League	Playoffs	U.S. Open Cup	Total
1	(Saint Lucia) David Flavius	1999–2006	183	8	4	195
2	(Scotland) Kevin Kerr	2013–2019	181	5	8	194
3	**(Jamaica) Kenardo Forbes**	2018–present	177	7	8	192
4	(United States) Gary DePalma	1999–2004	145	8	4	157
5	(United States) Mike Green	2012–2017	133	2	6	141
6	(United States) Sterling Flunder	2010–2015	123	4	8	135
7	(United States) Nathan Salsi	2004–2006; 2008–2010	113	6	7	126
8	(United States) Randy Dedini	1999–2003	113	8	4	125
9	(United States) Jaman Tripoli	1999–2003	105	4	3	112
10	(United States) Hunter Gilstrap	2010–2014; 2016–2017	102	3	5	110

Bold denotes players still playing for the club.

=== Goals ===
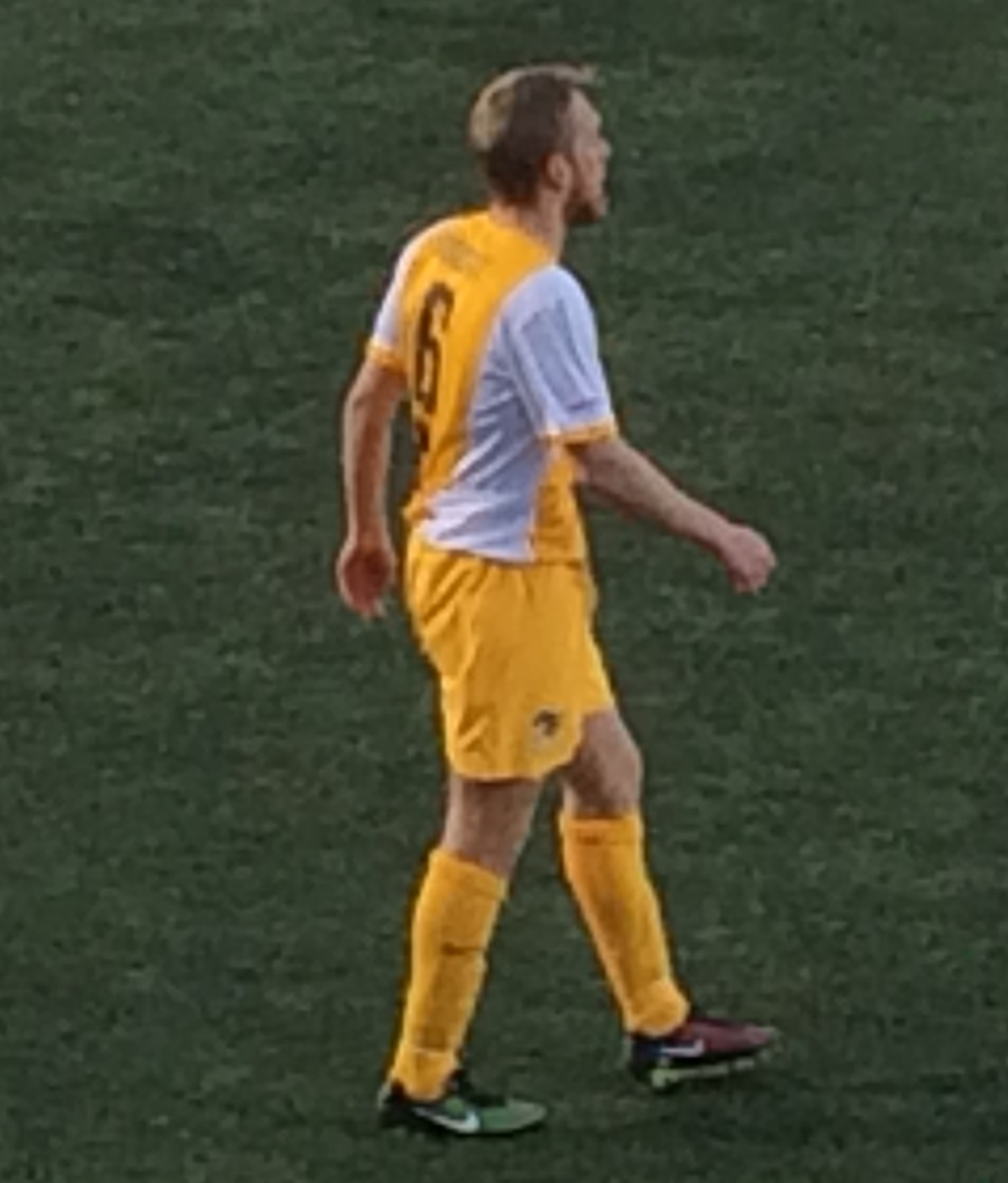
Rob Vincent is sixth all-time with 29 goals.

As of January 29, 2024

	Name	Years	League	Playoffs	U.S. Open Cup	Total
1	(Saint Lucia) David Flavius	1999–2006	58	3	1	62
2	(Cameroon) Albert Dikwa	2020–2023	37	0	4	41
3	(Jamaica) Neco Brett	2018–2019	28	4	2	34
4	(Scotland) Kevin Kerr	2013–2019	29	0	3	32
5	(Brazil) Thiago Martins	2002–2003	30	0	1	31
5	(United States) Russell Cicerone	2021-2022	29	2	0	31
6	(England) Rob Vincent	2013–2015; 2016	25	0	4	29
7	(United States) Corey Hertzog	2016–2017	27	0	0	27
8	(United States) Phil Karn	1999–2002	23	1	2	26
9	(Colombia) José Angulo	2013–2014	23	0	1	24
10	(United States) Mike Apple	1999–2002; 2004; 2006	21	1	0	22

Bold denotes players still playing for the club.

== Notable match results ==
=== U.S. Open Cup ===
June 14, 2000 2000 Second round	Pittsburgh Riverhounds	1–2	(New York (state)) Rochester Raging Rhinos	Bethel Park, PA
	Karn 20'	Report	Nash 15'; Lowe 74'	Stadium: Bethel Park Stadium; Attendance: 1,626; Referee: Brian Fenlon

June 27, 2001 2001 Second round	Pittsburgh Riverhounds	2–0	Colorado Rapids	Bethel Park, PA
	Ulloa 54'; Karn 90'	Report		Stadium: Bethel Park Stadium; Attendance: 1,660; Referee: JR Purdue

July 11, 2001 2001 Third round	El Paso Patriots (Texas)	1–2	Pittsburgh Riverhounds	El Paso, TX
	Macias 86'	Report	Flavius 1'; Gutierrez 48' (pen.)	Stadium: Soccorro Stadium; Referee: Kari Seitz

July 24, 2001 2001 Quarterfinals	Chicago Fire (Illinois)	3–2 (a.e.t.)	Pittsburgh Riverhounds	Wheaton, IL
	Stoichkov 15' (pen.); Kovalenko 49'; Magee 111'	Report	Wélton 9'; Dougherty 70'	Stadium: McCully Field; Attendance: 2,500; Referee: Andrew Barnes

July 16, 2003 2003 Third round	D.C. United (Washington, D.C.)	2–1	Pittsburgh Riverhounds	Germantown, MD
	Petke 33'; Kovalenko 44'	Report	Martins 74'	Stadium: Maryland SoccerPlex; Attendance: 3,073; Referee: Hector Tobon

June 15, 2005 2005 First round	Des Moines Menace (Iowa)	1–1 (a.e.t.) (4–2 p)	Pittsburgh Riverhounds	Waukee, IA
	Biggerstaff 111'	Report	Mupier 101'	Stadium: Waukee Stadium; Referee: Hidajet Tica
	Penalties
	Penalty scored		(penalty scored) (penalty scored); (penalty missed) Robinson; (penalty missed) MacKenzie

June 14, 2006 2006 First round	Michigan Bucks	2–0	Pittsburgh Riverhounds	Rochester, MI
	Uzoigwe 14'; Turpin 56'	Report		Stadium: Rochester Adams High School Stadium; Referee: Richard Rodriguez

June 10, 2008 2008 First round	A.A.C. Eagles (Illinois)	0–4	Pittsburgh Riverhounds	Lisle, IL
7:30 PM EDT		Report	Salsi; Browne; Jerome; MacKenzie	Stadium: Benedictine University Stadium; Referee: Victor Herrera

June 24, 2008 2008 Second round	Rochester Rhinos (New York (state))	3–0	Pittsburgh Riverhounds	Rochester, NY
7:30 PM EDT	Menyongar 26'; Salles 61'; Kreamalmeyer 75'	Report		Stadium: PAETEC Park; Attendance: 3,526; Referee: Jeffrey Mellen

June 9, 2009 2009 First round	Rochester Rhinos (New York (state))	1–1 (a.e.t.) (4–2 p)	Pittsburgh Riverhounds	Rochester, NY
7:00 PM EDT	Atieno 90+'		Bonseu 22'	Stadium: Rochester Rhinos Stadium; Attendance: 2,723; Referee: Jason Krnac
	Penalties
	(penalty missed) Atieno; (penalty scored) Gregor; (penalty scored) Bertz; (penalty scored) Salles; (penalty scored) Fitzpatrick		Hayden (penalty scored); Salsi (penalty missed); Evans (penalty missed); Brown (penalty scored)

June 15, 2010 2010 First round	Pittsburgh Riverhounds	2–0	(Michigan) Detroit United	Bridgeville, PA
7:00 PM EDT	Weekes 35' (pen.); Gazda 42'	Report		Stadium: Chartiers Valley High School Stadium; Attendance: 237; Referee: John Safer

June 22, 2010 2010 Second round	Rochester Rhinos (New York (state))	3–0	Pittsburgh Riverhounds	Rochester, NY
7:05 PM EDT	Rosenlund 3', 66'; Pitchkolan 8'	Report		Stadium: Marina Auto Stadium; Attendance: 1,788; Referee: Sorin Stoica

June 14, 2011 2011 First round	Pittsburgh Riverhounds	3–2 (a.e.t.)	(Tennessee) Chattanooga FC	Bridgeville, PA
7:00 PM EDT	Yeisley 79'; Lundberg 89'; Deighton 99'	Report	Heredia 14'; Beattie 55'	Stadium: Chartiers Valley Stadium; Attendance: 305; Referee: Vito Testa, Jr.

June 21, 2011 2011 Second round	Richmond Kickers (Virginia)	4–1	Pittsburgh Riverhounds	Richmond, VA
7:00 PM EDT	Bulow 17', 41'; Delicâte 52', 81'	Report	Severs 30'	Stadium: City Stadium; Attendance: 1,161; Referee: Jim Sadowski

May 22, 2012 2012 Second round	Pittsburgh Riverhounds	0–1	Michigan Bucks	Pittsburgh, PA
7:00 PM EDT		Report	Givens 90+1' (pen.)	Stadium: Highmark Stadium; Referee: Sorin Stoica

May 14, 2013 2013 First round	Pittsburgh Riverhounds	1–1 (a.e.t.) (5–4 p)	(Illinois) RWB Adria	Pittsburgh, PA
7:00 PM EDT	C'deBaca 53'	Report	Munoz 17'	Stadium: Highmark Stadium; Attendance: 1,400; Referee: John Douglas
	Penalties
	Angulo (penalty scored); Green (penalty scored); Vincent (penalty scored); Dallman (penalty scored); Kerr (penalty scored)		(penalty scored) (penalty scored) (penalty scored); (penalty missed) Morris (penalty scored)

May 21, 2013 2013 Second round	Ocean City Nor'easters (New Jersey)	1–0	Pittsburgh Riverhounds	Ocean City, NJ
8:30 PM EDT	Tribbett 68'	Report		Stadium: Carey Stadium; Referee: Ayodeji Obisesan

May 14, 2014 2014 Second round	Pittsburgh Riverhounds	3–1	(New York (state)) New York Red Bulls U-23	Pittsburgh, PA
7:00 PM EDT	Kerr 10'; Angulo 68'; Vincent 81'	Report	Sheridan 12' (pen.)	Stadium: Highmark Stadium; Referee: Vito Testa, Jr.

May 28, 2014 2014 Third round	Pittsburgh Riverhounds	3–2	(Illinois) RWB Adria	Pittsburgh, PA
7:00 PM EDT	Earls 40'; John 80'; Arteaga 112'	Report	Huffman 44'; Bond 62'	Stadium: Highmark Stadium; Referee: John Douglas

June 18, 2014 2014 Fourth round	Chicago Fire (Illinois)	2–1	Pittsburgh Riverhounds	Bridgeview, IL
9:23 PM EDT	Ward 22'; Magee 40'	Report	Marshall 42'	Stadium: Toyota Park; Referee: Alex Chilowicz

May 20, 2015 2015 Second round	Pittsburgh Riverhounds	3–0	West Virginia Chaos	Pittsburgh, PA
7:00 PM EDT	Vincent 9'; Moloto 10'; Kerr 87'	Report		Stadium: Highmark Stadium; Attendance: 1,500; Referee: Brandon Artis

May 27, 2015 2015 Third round	Pittsburgh Riverhounds	1–0	(Florida) Tampa Bay Rowdies	Pittsburgh, PA
7:00 PM EDT	Vincent 90+1'	Report		Stadium: Highmark Stadium; Attendance: 1,500; Referee: Charles Murphy

June 17, 2015 2015 Fourth round	Pittsburgh Riverhounds	1–3 (a.e.t.)	(Washington, D.C.) D.C. United	Pittsburgh, PA
7:00 PM EDT	Vincent 24' (pen.)	Report	Coria 8'; Opare 92'; DeLeon 104'	Stadium: Highmark Stadium; Attendance: 3,988; Referee: Marcos DeOliveira

May 18, 2016 2016 Second round	Pittsburgh Riverhounds	0–2	(New York (state)) Lansdowne Bhoys	Pittsburgh, PA
7:30 PM EDT		Report	Purcell 10'; Kavanagh 76'	Stadium: Highmark Stadium; Referee: Charles Murphy

May 17, 2017 2017 Second round	Chicago FC United (Illinois)	3–1	Pittsburgh Riverhounds	Chicago, IL
8:00 PM EDT	Segbers 19'; Barlow 73'; Sierakowski 90+'	Report	Banjo 52'	Stadium: Hoyne Field; Attendance: 300; Referee: Alex Beehler

May 16, 2018 2018 Second round	Erie Commodores (Pennsylvania)	1–2	Pittsburgh Riverhounds SC	Erie, PA
7:00 PM EDT	Philpot 45'	Report	Vancaeyezeele 4'; Kerr 30' (pen.)	Stadium: McConnell Family Stadium; Attendance: 451; Referee: James Duling

May 23, 2018 2018 Third round	Pittsburgh Riverhounds SC	1–3	(Ohio) FC Cincinnati	Pittsburgh, PA
7:00 PM EDT	Chin 88'	Report	McLaughlin 39'; Laing 61'; Haber 62'	Stadium: Highmark Stadium; Attendance: 1,500; Referee: Kevin Fikar

May 14, 2019 2019 Second round	Pittsburgh Riverhounds SC	3–0	(Ohio) Dayton Dutch Lions	Pittsburgh, PA
7:00 PM EDT	Brett 57' (pen.), 69'; Velarde 90+1'	Report		Stadium: Highmark Stadium; Attendance: 523; Referee: Austin Saini

May 29, 2019 2019 Third round	Pittsburgh Riverhounds SC	1–0	(Indiana) Indy Eleven	Pittsburgh, PA
7:00 PM EDT	Forbes 85'	Report		Stadium: Highmark Stadium; Attendance: 444; Referee: Chris Ruska

June 11, 2019 2019 Fourth round	Columbus Crew SC (Ohio)	1–0	Pittsburgh Riverhounds SC	Columbus, OH
7:00 PM EDT	Accam 55'	Report		Stadium: Mapfre Stadium; Attendance: 5,202; Referee: Matthew Franz

April 5, 2022 2022 Second round	Pittsburgh Riverhounds SC	2–0	Maryland Bobcats FC	Pittsburgh, PA
7:00 PM EDT	Sims 37', 56'			Stadium: Highmark Stadium

April 19, 2022 2022 U.S. Open Cup	FC Cincinnati (Ohio)	2–0 (a.e.t.)	Pittsburgh Riverhounds SC	Cincinnati, Ohio
7:30 pm EDT	Barreal 95' (pen.), 99'	Report		Stadium: TQL Stadium; Attendance: 5,458; Referee: Eric Tattersall

May 9, 2023 2023 U.S. Open Cup	New England Revolution (Massachusetts)	0–1	Pittsburgh Riverhounds SC	Foxborough, Massachusetts
7:30 PM EDT		Report	Griffin 44'	Stadium: Gillette Stadium; Attendance: 1,100; Referee: Matthew Thompson

May 24, 2023 2023 U.S. Open Cup	Pittsburgh Riverhounds SC	1–0	(Ohio) Columbus Crew	Pittsburgh, Pennsylvania
7:00 PM EDT	Dikwa 22'; Kizza (red card) 90+5'	Report		Stadium: Highmark Stadium; Attendance: 6,107; Referee: Jeremy Scheer

June 6, 2023 2023 U.S. Open Cup	FC Cincinnati (Ohio)	3–1	Pittsburgh Riverhounds SC	Cincinnati, Ohio
7:00 PM EDT	Vazquez 56'; Barreal 71'; Arias 90+3'	Report	Showunmi 90+4'	Stadium: TQL Stadium; Attendance: 16,613; Referee: Elvis Osmanovic

May 7, 2024 2024 Round of 32	Pittsburgh Riverhounds SC	0–1	(Oklahoma) FC Tulsa	Pittsburgh, Pennsylvania
7:00 PM EDT		Report	Goodrum 88'	Stadium: Highmark Stadium; Attendance: 1,131; Referee: Brad Jensen

April 15, 2025 2025 Third round	Columbus Crew 2 (Ohio)	0–1	Pittsburgh Riverhounds SC	Columbus, Ohio
6:00 PM EDT		Report	Griffin 28'	Stadium: Lower.com Field; Attendance: 376; Referee: Rogelio Alvarez

May 7, 2025 2025 Round of 32	Pittsburgh Riverhounds SC	1–0	(New York (state)) New York City FC	Pittsburgh, Pennsylvania
7:00 PM EDT	Ydrach 70+7'	Report		Stadium: Highmark Stadium; Attendance: 3,661; Referee: Rodrigo Albuquerque

May 21, 2025 2025 Round of 16	Philadelphia Union (Pennsylvania)	4-1	Pittsburgh Riverhounds SC	Chester, Pennsylvania
7:30 PM EDT	Damiani 14' (pen.); Vassilev 45+1'; Jacques 54'; Lukic 86'	Report	Garcia 63'	Stadium: Subaru Park; Attendance: 6,604

=== Friendlies vs. MLS teams ===
August 10, 2005 Friendly	Pittsburgh Riverhounds	0–0	Columbus Crew	Washington, PA
		Report		Stadium: Falconi Field; Attendance: 3,200

August 8, 2006 Friendly	Pittsburgh Riverhounds	1–1	Columbus Crew	Washington, PA
	Becerra 41'	Report	Browne 49'	Stadium: Falconi Field; Attendance: 3,600

March 25, 2016 Friendly	Columbus Crew SC	2–0	Pittsburgh Riverhounds	Obetz, OH
	K. Kamara 8'; Cedrick 68'	Report		Stadium: EAS Training Center

=== Frank B. Fuhrer International Friendly Series ===
In summer 2013, the Riverhounds introduced the Frank B. Fuhrer International Friendly Series, an intended annual international friendly match pitting the Riverhounds against top clubs from around the world. The series was named after investor and local businessman Frank B. Fuhrer, who was also former owner of the Pittsburgh Spirit indoor soccer team. The first edition of the series was held on July 19, 2013 as the Riverhounds fell 1–4 against reigning FA Cup holders Wigan Athletic. Despite being announced as an annual event, only one match has been held.

July 19, 2013 Friendly	Pittsburgh Riverhounds	1–4	Wigan Athletic	Pittsburgh, PA
7:00 PM EDT	Angulo 3'	Report	Espinoza 11'; Boyce 29'; Holt 48'; Gómez 88'	Stadium: Highmark Stadium

=== Keystone Derby Cup ===
Although they had been rivals and competed against each other in previous seasons, the inaugural Keystone Derby was officially contested between the Riverhounds and Penn FC in 2015. Pittsburgh went on to win the cup in the first edition of the tournament with a head-to-head record of three wins and one loss.

Year	GP	Win	Draw	Loss	GF	GA	+/-	Result	Ref.
2015	4	3	0	1	16	12	+4		
2016	3	0	2	1	2	3	-1		
2017	3	2	1	0	4	0	+4		
2018	3	1	2	0	2	0	+2		

Key

- Won
- Lost
