= 2013 Pittsburgh Riverhounds season =

Pittsburgh Riverhounds
2013 season
- Chairman: Jason Kutney
- Manager: Justin Evans
- Stadium: Highmark Stadium
- USL Pro: 7th
- U.S. Open Cup: Third round
- Top goalscorer: José Angulo (15)
- Highest home attendance: 4,000; April 13 v. Harrisburg City Islanders
- Lowest home attendance: 3,104; June 7 v. Toronto FC Reserves

The 2013 Pittsburgh Riverhounds season was the club's fourteenth season of existence. It was the Riverhounds' third season playing in the USL Professional Division. It was the first season the Riverhounds will play at Highmark Stadium, a newly built 3,500 capacity soccer specific stadium.

== Background ==
Before the season began, the Riverhounds announced they would have a new stadium to play in, the 3,500 seat Highmark Stadium located in Pittsburgh's Station Square area.

== Competitions ==
=== USL Pro ===
April 6, 2013 1	Pittsburgh Riverhounds	0–0	Richmond Kickers	Richmond, VA

April 13, 2013 2	Harrisburg City Islanders	2–1	Pittsburgh Riverhounds	Pittsburgh, PA
	Tourey 78'; Mkosana 90'		Angulo 70'

April 20, 2013 3	Pittsburgh Riverhounds	1–2	Dayton Dutch Lions	Beavercreek, OH
	Kerr 45'		Bardsley 44'; Klasse 90'

April 26, 2013 4	Pittsburgh Riverhounds	0–2	Charlotte Eagles	Charlotte, NC
			Ramirez 3'; Meza 54'

April 27, 2013 5	Pittsburgh Riverhounds	0–2	Charleston Battery	Charleston, SC
			Azira 24'; Azira 61'

May 3, 2013 6	Pittsburgh Riverhounds	1–1	Phoenix FC	Phoenix, AZ
	Marshall 79'		Toia 11'

May 5, 2013 7	Pittsburgh Riverhounds	0–0	LA Blues	Los Angeles, CA

May 9, 2013 8	Phoenix FC	1–2	Pittsburgh Riverhounds	Pittsburgh, PA
	King 90'		Angulo 22'; Angulo 51'

May 18, 2013 9	Dayton Dutch Lions	2–2	Pittsburgh Riverhounds	Pittsburgh, PA
	Bardsley 61'; Westdjik 81'		Arteaga 10'; Angulo 51'

May 24, 2013 10	Antigua Barracuda FC	0–2	Pittsburgh Riverhounds	Pittsburgh, PA
	Mack (yellow card) 38'; Daniel (yellow card) 76'; James (yellow card) 78'; Dublin (red card) 78'		Seth 18' (yellow card) 19' (yellow-red card) 22'; Dallman 39'; Costanzo (yellow card) 12'; Arteaga (yellow card) 49'; Kinne (yellow card) 89'

June 1, 2013 11	Rochester Rhinos	0–3	Pittsburgh Riverhounds	Pittsburgh, PA
	Earls (yellow card) 70'; Banks (yellow card) 78'		Angulo 42'; Arteaga 63'; Kinne 88'

June 7, 2013 12	Toronto FC Reserves	1–1	Pittsburgh Riverhounds	Pittsburgh, PA
	Wiedman 72'		Angulo 9'

June 15, 2013 13	Charleston Battery	1–1	Pittsburgh Riverhounds	Pittsburgh, PA
	Cuevas 37'		Angulo 71'

June 21, 2013 14	Pittsburgh Riverhounds	4–3	Harrisburg City Islanders	Harrisburg, PA
	Angulo 48' (pen.) 76'; Amoo 58'; Seth 83'		Mellor 1'; McLaughlin 21'; Touray 90'

June 23, 2013 15	Antigua Barracuda FC	1–4	Pittsburgh Riverhounds	Pittsburgh, PA
	Thomas 13'		Amoo 6', 55'; Vincent 16'; Angulo 64'

July 4, 2013 16	Charlotte Eagles	3–2	Pittsburgh Riverhounds	Pittsburgh, PA
	Herrera 17'; Thornton 45'; Marshall 72' (o.g.)		Amoo 15'; Marshall 40'

July 9, 2013 17	Los Angeles Blues	2–1	Pittsburgh Riverhounds	Pittsburgh, PA
	Jock 64'; Fondy 89'		Angulo 21'

July 17, 2013 18	Orlando City	0–0	Pittsburgh Riverhounds	Pittsburgh, PA

July 21, 2013 19	Wilmington Hammerheads	1–2	Pittsburgh Riverhounds	Pittsburgh, PA
	Greig 72'		Seth 52'; Dallman 79'

July 27, 2013 20	Pittsburgh Riverhounds	1–0	Toronto FC Reserves	Toronto, ON
	Angulo 41'

August 2, 2013 21	Pittsburgh Riverhounds	2–1	VSI Tampa Bay FC	Tampa Bay, FL
	Green 66'; Seth 77'		Hoffer 23'

August 3, 2013 22	Pittsburgh Riverhounds	1–0	Orlando City	Orlando, FL
	Kinne 52'

August 9, 2013 23	Pittsburgh Riverhounds	0–1	Rochester Rhinos	Rochester, NY
			McManus 90+'

August 11, 2013 24	VSI Tampa Bay	2–3	Pittsburgh Riverhounds	Pittsburgh, PA
	Burt 70'; Budnyy 85'		Angulo 53' (pen.); Vincent 60'; Amoo 68'

August 14, 2013 25	Pittsburgh Riverhounds	1–4	Wilmington Hammerheads	Wilmington, NC
	Angulo 13'		Greig 32'; Perry 76'; Taylor 82'; Arnoux 85'

August 17, 2013 26	Richmond Kickers	1–1	Pittsburgh Riverhounds	Pittsburgh, PA
	Ngwenya 68'		Angulo 64'

==== Standings ====
Pos	Team	Pld	W	T	L	GF	GA	GD	Pts	Qualification
5	Charlotte Eagles (A)	26	10	11	5	44	39	+5	41	Playoffs
6	Los Angeles Blues (A)	26	11	7	8	52	37	+15	40	Playoffs
7	Pittsburgh Riverhounds (A)	26	10	8	8	36	33	+3	38	Playoffs
8	Dayton Dutch Lions (A)	26	10	7	9	43	46	−3	37	Playoffs
9	Wilmington Hammerheads	26	11	4	11	35	39	−4	36 (Note: Wilmington were deducted one point for fielding an ineligible player on July 21 against Pittsburgh.)	

Source: USL Pro official standings
Rules for classification: 1) points; 2) goal difference; 3) number of goals scored.
(A) Advances to USL Pro Playoffs

=== U.S. Open Cup ===
May 14, 2013 First round	Pittsburgh Riverhounds	1–1 (a.e.t.) (5–4 p)	RWB Adria	Pittsburgh, PA
	C’deBaca 53'	Report	Munoz 13'
	Penalties
	Penalty scored		Penalty scored Penalty missed

May 21, 2013	Ocean City Nor'easters	1–0	Pittsburgh Riverhounds	Ocean City, New Jersey
7:30 PM CDT				Stadium: Carey Stadium

=== Friendlies ===
July 19, 2013	Pittsburgh Riverhounds	1–4	Wigan Athletic	Pittsburgh, PA
	Angulo 3'		Espinoza 11'; Boyce 28'; Holt 48'; Gomez 88'	Stadium: Highmark Stadium

== Statistics ==
=== Squad information ===
- Statistics up to date as of 8/12*

No.	Nat.	Player	Birthday	Previous club	2013 USL Pro appearances	2013 USL Pro goals
Goalkeepers
0	(United States)	Greg Blum	April 12, 1989 (age 36)	(United States) Slippery Rock University	4	0
1	(United States)	Hunter Gilstrap	April 17, 1983 (age 42)	(United States) Cleveland City Stars	20	0
24	(United States)	Ryan Hullings	July 19, 1991 (age 34)	(United States) Baldwin Wallace Yellow Jackets	0	0
Defenders
3	(United States)	Anthony Vazquez	March 12, 1989 (age 36)	Puerto Rico Islanders	5	0
4	(Croatia)	Nikola Katic	June 1, 1986 (age 39)	(United States) Springfield Demize	4	0
5	(United States)	Sterling Flunder	February 14, 1986 (age 40)	(United States) Portland Timbers U23s	21	0
12	(United States)	Mike Seth	September 20, 1987 (age 38)	(United States) Colorado Rapids U-23	20	3
15	(United States)	Andrew Marshall	January 17, 1984 (age 42)	(United States) Harrisburg City Islanders	24	2
Midfielders
3	(England)	Rob Vincent	October 26, 1990 (age 35)	(United States) University of Charleston	21	3
6	(United States)	Rich Costanzo	February 17, 1987 (age 39)	(United States) Rochester Rhinos	22	1
8	(England)	Michael Green	December 25, 1989 (age 36)	(United States) New Mexico Lobos	18	0
9	(United States)	Stefan Lundberg	April 12, 1989 (age 36)	(United States) Duquesne Dukes	15	0
10	(Scotland)	Kevin Kerr	January 12, 1989 (age 37)	(Germany) SC Wiedenbrück 2000	19	1
11	(United States)	Alfonso Motagalvan	February 11, 1987 (age 39)	(United States) Fort Lauderdale Strikers	20	0
13	(United States)	Louie Rolko	September 7, 1984 (age 41)	(United States) Charleston Battery	1	0
14	(United States)	Seth C'deBaca	April 28, 1988 (age 37)	(United States) D.C. United U-23	18	0
16	(United States)	Ryan Kinne	August 31, 1989 (age 36)	(United States) Connecticut FC Azul	21	2
19	(United States)	Jason Kutney	September 5, 1981 (age 44)	(United States) Charleston Battery	2	0
20	(United States)	Matthew Dallman	March 9, 1985 (age 40)	(Germany) Sportfreunde Siegen	22	2
22	(United States)	Mike Seamon	August 30, 1988 (age 37)	(United States) Seattle Sounders FC	13	0
Forwards
7	(Ghana)	Darren Amoo	June 2, 1988 (age 37)	(United States) Liberty Flames	20	5
17	(Colombia)	Jhonny Arteaga	November 24, 1986 (age 39)	(United States) New York Red Bulls	16	2
18	(Colombia)	José Angulo	January 13, 1988 (age 38)	(United States) New York Red Bulls	22	13
23	(United States)	Daniel Holowaty	August 26, 1989 (age 36)	(United States) Dayton Dutch Lions	3	0

== See also ==
- 2013 in American soccer
- 2013 USL Pro season
- Pittsburgh Riverhounds
