= Salsi (surname) =

Salsi is a surname. Notable people with the surname include:

- Luca Salsi (born 1975), Italian operatic baritone
- Nathan Salsi (born 1981), American soccer player
