= Minh Vu =

American soccer player

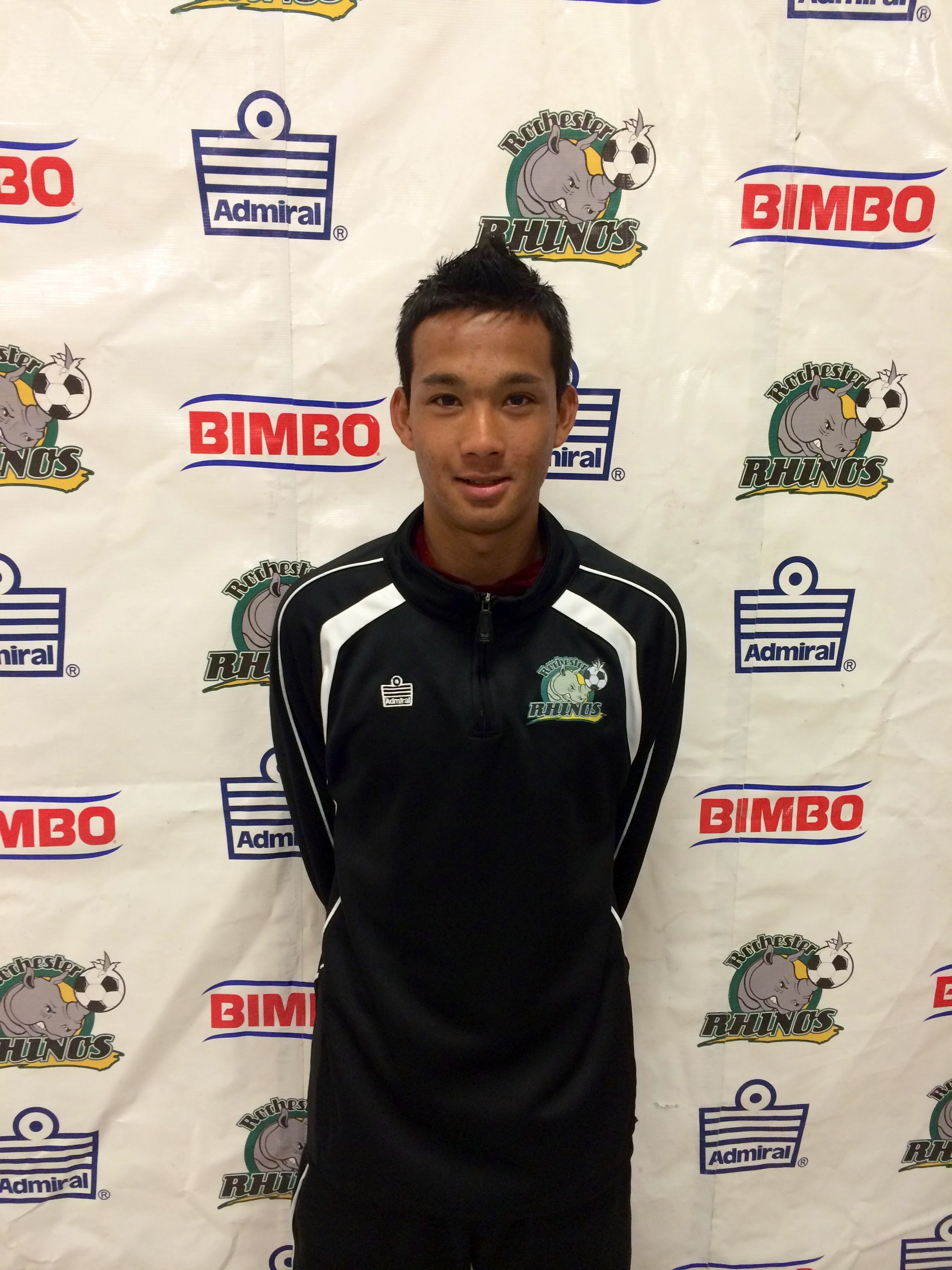

Personal information
- Full name: Minh Alva Vu
- Date of birth: September 27, 1990 (age 36)
- Place of birth: Tucson, Arizona, United States
- Height: 5 ft 10 in (1.78 m)
- Positions: Attacking midfielder; forward

Team information
- Current team: Deportivo La Real
- Number: 10

Youth career
- 2009–2010: PCC Aztecs
- 2011–2012: Penn State Nittany Lions

Senior career*
Years	Team	Apps	(Gls)
2014	Rochester Rhinos	20	(2)
2016	FC Tucson	4	(3)
2016	Arizona United	2	(0)
2018	San Francisco Glens	4	(0)
2020–	Deportivo La Real	8	(12)
- * Club domestic league appearances and goals as of February 7, 2021

Minh Alva Vu, commonly known as Minh Vu, (born September 27, 1990) is an American soccer player for National Soccer League US side Deportivo La Real FC.

== Career ==
=== College and amateur ===
Vu played fours years of college soccer - two at Pima Community College between 2009 and 2010 and two at Penn State University between 2011 and 2012.

=== Professional ===
Vu signed his first professional deal with USL Pro club Rochester Rhinos on February 13, 2014.

== Personal life ==
Vu's father is Vietnamese and his mother is Spanish. It was reported that Vu will attempt to obtain Vietnamese citizenship in order to play for V-League club SHB Đà Nẵng in the future.

== See also ==
- List of Vietnam footballers born outside Vietnam
