= Jeffrey Kyei =

German footballer

Personal information
- Full name: Jeffrey Kwabrna Kyei
- Date of birth: 17 October 1989 (age 37)
- Place of birth: Tübingen, Germany
- Height: 1.85 m (6 ft 1 in)
- Position: Midfielder

Youth career
- 2012–2013: Des Moines Menace

College career
Years	Team	Apps	(Gls)
2012–2014	California Vulcans	53	(22)

Senior career*
Years	Team	Apps	(Gls)
2015	Pittsburgh Riverhounds	1	(0)
2016	FC Wichita	11	(4)
2016–2017	SSV Reutlingen	2	(0)
Total		14	(4)
- * Club domestic league appearances and goals

Jeffrey Kwabrna Kyei (born 17 October 1989) is a German former professional footballer who played as a midfielder.

== Club career ==
Kyei played for the California Vulcans, an NCAA Division II team in the United States, between 2012 and 2014. During this time he also played with the Des Moines Menace of the Premier Development League.

Kyei played with the Pittsburgh Riverhounds of the United Soccer League during the 2015 USL season. He made his debut in a 1–1 draw against Saint Louis FC, coming on as a substitute in the 67th minute.

On 27 March 2016, Kyei signed with FC Wichita of the National Premier Soccer League. He scored four goals in 11 appearances.
