= David Flavius =

Saint Lucian footballer

Personal information
- Full name: David Flavius
- Date of birth: 1 September 1972 (age 54)
- Place of birth: Castries, Saint Lucia
- Height: 5 ft 7 in (1.70 m)
- Position: Striker

Youth career
- 1995–1998: Ohio Dominican Panthers

Senior career*
Years	Team	Apps	(Gls)
1999–2006	Pittsburgh Riverhounds	182	(56)

International career^{‡}
1990–2004	Saint Lucia	9+	(3+)
- * Club domestic league appearances and goals as of 15 February 2013 ‡ National team caps and goals as of 15 February 2013

David Flavius (born 1 September 1972) is a former Saint Lucian international footballer and current coach. Flavius is most well known as being the record holder for most appearances and most goals scored for the Pittsburgh Riverhounds. He held the record for most assists until the 2019 season when his tally was surpassed by Kevin Kerr. In 2019 he was inducted into the Riverhounds Hall of Fame in its inaugural class.

== Early life ==
Flavius was born in Castries on the Caribbean island of Saint Lucia. His brother, Earl Jean, was a professional footballer for clubs in England, Portugal, Scotland, and Trinidad. From an early age, Flavius was a standout for both his club and junior national teams before moving to the United States to play college soccer.

== College ==
Flavius attended Ohio Dominican University from 1995 to 1998 and attained a BA in Business Administration. While playing for the Panthers, Flavius scored 99 goals and had 220 career points to become the university's all-time leading scorer. Flavius also holds three of the top four goal scoring seasons with 38 goals in 1996, 25 in 1997 and 22 in 1998. He also scored a goal in 12 straight games from 11 September to 20 October 1998. Because of his performances, Flavius was named all-conference three times and conference player of the year twice and was also named an NAIA honorable mention All-American in 1998. Flavius was inducted into the school's athletic hall of fame in 2009.

== Club career ==
Flavius was a first-round draft pick, 6th overall, of the Kansas City Attack of the NPSL indoor soccer league in 1998. However, after college Flavius was signed by the Pittsburgh Riverhounds which was then a member of the A-League on 12 April 1999. Flavius spent his entire 8-year career with the club, playing in 182 league matches, tallying 24 assists, and scoring 56 goals, a club record in all three categories. During that time, Flavius was the team's most valuable player 4 times and leading scorer 5 times. He was also a key figure in the Riverhound's only undefeated season at home and its quarter final run in the U.S. Open Cup. In 2001, Flavius also played one season of indoor soccer with the Cleveland Crunch, tallying seven goals and three assists in 34 matches. Flavius retired after the 2006 season. Flavius announced his impending retirement at age 34 when it was announced that the Riverhounds would be on hiatus during the 2007 season, citing projected issues with his fitness following a season off.

== International career ==
Flavius was a regular in Saint Lucia's youth and olympic squads. He got his first call up to the senior squad at the age of 17. In 1994, he was named Saint Lucia's Junior Footballer of the Year. He made a total of at least 9 appearances and scored at least 3 goals for the Saint Lucia national football team. In 1996, Flavius appeared in a match against Saint Kitts and Nevis as part of 1998 FIFA World Cup qualification. In 2001, Flavius scored two goals against the U.S. Virgin Islands in a 14-1 2001 Caribbean Cup qualification victory, the largest margin of victory in the nation's history. Flavius was not called up again until March 2003 for 2003 CONCACAF Gold Cup qualification. In that tournament, Flavius was part of the squad that surprisingly narrowly missed out on qualifying for the 2003 CONCACAF Gold Cup by finishing third in their group. He scored another goal for the senior squad during the final rounds of qualification for that tournament in the 90th minute of a 2–1 victory over Haiti.

=== International goals ===
Scores and results list Saint Lucia's goal tally first.

#	Date	Venue	Opponent	Score	Result	Competition	Reference
	14 April 2001	Stade Sylvio Cator, Port-au-Prince, Haiti	U.S. Virgin Islands		14–1	2001 Caribbean Cup qualification	
	14 April 2001	Stade Sylvio Cator, Port-au-Prince, Haiti	U.S. Virgin Islands		14–1	2001 Caribbean Cup qualification	
	28 March 2003	Independence Park, Kingston, Jamaica	Haiti	2–1	2–1	2003 CONCACAF Gold Cup qualification	

== Coaching career ==
Flavius holds a National Youth License and a FIFA Certificate. He has worked with college and high schools camps, independent camps with high school teams, 3v3 teams, futsal programs, travel and classic teams. Flavius was previously a coach with the A.C. Atletico Soccer Academy. He was also the Boys Director of Coaching at Foothills Soccer Club in Youngwood, PA. Flavius then became a coach at Hotspurs Football Club in Pittsburgh, PA for 1 year and is currently at the new Century Football Club branch in Irwin, Pa.
