= Nathan Salsi =

American soccer player

Personal information
- Full name: Nathan Salsi
- Date of birth: June 12, 1981 (age 45)
- Place of birth: Pittsburgh, Pennsylvania, United States
- Height: 6 ft 2 in (1.88 m)
- Position: Defender

Youth career
- 1999–2002: Duquesne Dukes

Senior career*
Years	Team	Apps	(Gls)
2004–2006	Pittsburgh Riverhounds	56	(2)
2008–2010	Pittsburgh Riverhounds	56	(4)
- * Club domestic league appearances and goals

Nathan Salsi (born June 12, 1981, in Pittsburgh, Pennsylvania) is an American soccer player who last played for the Pittsburgh Riverhounds in the USL Second Division.

On January 22, 2010, he was ranked 11th in the USL Second Division Top 15 of the Decade, which announced a list of the best and most influential players of the previous decade.

== Career ==
=== Amateur ===
Salsi grew up in North Huntingdon, Pennsylvania, attended Norwin High School, and played college soccer at the Duquesne University, where he was named to the Atlantic 10 First Team All Conference.

=== Professional ===
Salsi turned professional in 2004 when he signed to play for the Pittsburgh Riverhounds in the USL Second Division, and remained with the team through the end of 2006.

Salsi returned to the Riverhounds in 2008 following their hiatus year in 2007, and has been ever-present in the Pittsburgh back line, playing in over 40 games for the team, and acting as club captain. He was named to the All-USL Division 2 team in both 2004 and 2005.

Salsi continues to be active with the club now as a head coach in the Riverhounds Development Academy
