= Miroslav Čabrilo =

Serbian footballer (born 1992)

Personal information
- Date of birth: 6 June 1992 (age 34)
- Place of birth: Nevesinje, Bosnia and Herzegovina
- Height: 6 ft 1 in (1.85 m)
- Positions: Forward; attacking midfielder

Youth career
- 2010–2013: Robert Morris Colonials

Senior career*
Years	Team	Apps	(Gls)
2011	Ottawa Fury	15	(3)
2012	Hamilton Rage	16	(3)
2014–2015	Pittsburgh Riverhounds	34	(5)
2016	Hamilton City	18	(3)
2017	Brantford Galaxy	13	(6)
2018–2020	Hamilton City		
2021–2022	BGH City		
2023	Hamilton City		
- * Club domestic league appearances and goals

Miroslav Čabrilo (born 6 June 1992) is a Serbian former soccer player who played as a forward and midfielder.

== Club career ==
=== College and amateur ===
Čabrilo played with Glendale Secondary School's soccer team and was offered a scholarship by Robert Morris University in 2010. He would also help Glendale win the 2010 Spectator Cup, where he contributed a goal against Sir John A. Macdonald Secondary School. Throughout his tenure with Glendale, he was named the school's male athlete of the year for three years.

He played four years of college soccer at Robert Morris University between 2010 and 2013. In his senior year with the team, he was named team captain.

During his college years, Čabrilo played with Ottawa Fury in the American-based USL Premier Development League during the college offseason in 2011. He also played with Hamilton Rage for the 2012 summer season.

=== United States ===
Čabrilo signed his first professional contract with USL Pro club Pittsburgh Riverhounds on 12 May 2014. He finished his first season with the club with two goals in 15 appearances. Pittsburgh re-signed him for the 2015 season. Throughout the season, he participated in the 2015 U.S. Open Cup and played against D.C. United.

=== Canada ===
Čabrilo returned to Canada in the summer of 2016 to play in the southern Ontario-based Canadian Soccer League with new league entry Hamilton City in the league's first division. In his debut season in the Canadian circuit, he helped the club secure a playoff berth. Hamilton would defeat Scarborough SC in the opening round of the playoffs. In the next round, Hamilton defeated the divisional champions, the York Region Shooters, to advance to the CSL Championship. He would appear in the championship final where the Serbian White Eagles claimed the title.

The next season he signed with league rivals Brantford Galaxy. He would finish the season as the club's top goal scorer with 6 goals in 13 matches and recorded six goals. Brantford would be eliminated from the postseason competition in the first round by Scarborough.

He was transferred to Hamilton after the organization returned for the 2018 season. He re-signed with Hamilton for the 2019 season. Hamilton qualified for the playoffs, where they were eliminated in the quarterfinal round by Ukraine United. After the temporary merger between Hamilton and Brantford for the COVID-19 pandemic in 2021, he played with their hybrid team BGH City for two seasons.

== Managerial career ==
In 2014, he joined the Robert Morris Colonials coaching staff as an assistant coach. In 2023, he joined the technical staff for Force Academy.

== Honors ==
Hamilton City

- CSL Championship runner–up: 2016
