= Louie Rolko =

American soccer player and coach

Personal information
- Full name: Louie Rolko
- Date of birth: September 7, 1984 (age 42)
- Place of birth: Hudson, Ohio, U.S.
- Height: 6 ft 1 in (1.85 m)
- Position: Midfielder

Team information
- Current team: Baldwin Wallace University (assistant)

Youth career
- 2003–2006: Baldwin-Wallace Yellow Jackets

Senior career*
Years	Team	Apps	(Gls)
2005–2006	Sioux Falls Spitfire	28	(1)
2007–2008	Charleston Battery	24	(1)
2010–2013	Pittsburgh Riverhounds	61	(0)

Managerial career
- 2013–2017: Baldwin Wallace University (assistant)
- 2017–: Lake Erie College (head coach)
- * Club domestic league appearances and goals as of July 21, 2012

Louie Rolko (born September 7, 1984) is an American former soccer player, currently serving as head coach of the Lake Erie College men's soccer program.

== Career ==
=== College and amateur ===
Rolko attended Hudson High School in Hudson, Ohio before entering Baldwin-Wallace College in 2003. He played four years of college soccer with the Jackets from 2003 to 2006.

In 2005 and 2006, Rolko also played for the Sioux Falls Spitfire in the fourth division USL Premier Development League during the collegiate off season.

=== Professional ===
Rolko turned professional in March 2007 when he signed with the Charleston Battery of the USL First Division after impressing in pre-season trials. He spent two seasons playing with the Battery, scoring one goal in 24 games, before being released after the end of the 2008 season.

On March 22, 2010, after two years out of the professional game, the Pittsburgh Riverhounds of the USL Second Division announced the signing of Rolko to a contract for the 2010 season. Rolko was the team captain for the 2012 campaign.

=== Coaching ===
On June 6, 2013, it was announced that Rolko would be returning to his alma mater to pursue a coaching career.

On March 1, 2017, Rolko was named the head coach of the Lake Erie College men's soccer program.
