= Danny Earls =

Irish footballer and artist

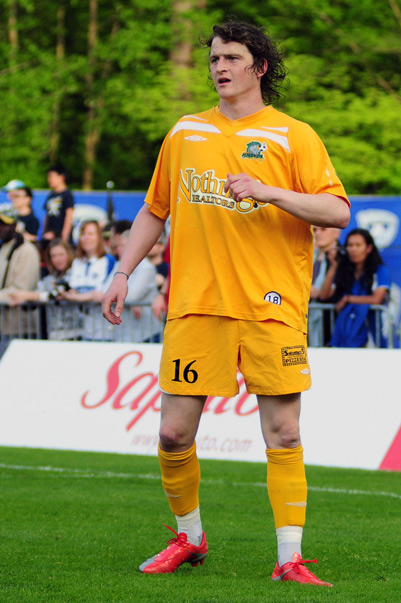

Personal information
- Full name: Daniel Keith Earls
- Date of birth: 22 April 1989 (age 37)
- Place of birth: Wicklow, Ireland
- Positions: Defender; midfielder

Youth career
- 1996–2001: Wicklow Rovers A.F.C
- 2001–2005: St. Josephs Boys Football Club
- 2005–2008: Aston Villa

Senior career*
Years	Team	Apps	(Gls)
2008–2009	Rochester Rhinos	53	(1)
2010–2011	Colorado Rapids	22	(0)
2012–2013	Rochester Rhinos	53	(5)
2014–2017	Pittsburgh Riverhounds	76	(4)

International career
- Republic of Ireland U15
- Republic of Ireland U16
- Republic of Ireland U18
- Republic of Ireland U19
- * Club domestic league appearances and goals as of 14 October 2017

Daniel Keith "Danny" Earls (born 22 April 1989) is an Irish former footballer and artist. Earls was scouted and signed as a teenager by English Premier League side Aston Villa and played youth football for the Republic of Ireland. He went on to have a nine-year professional career in the United States of America with Rochester Rhinos, Colorado Rapids and Pittsburgh Riverhounds. As of 2019, he is unattached, and focusing on becoming a professional comic book artist.

== Career ==
=== Europe ===
Born in Wicklow, Earls played for Wicklow Rovers A.F.C. and St. Josephs Boys A.F.C. in his native Ireland, before moving to English Premier League club Aston Villa in 2005. Earls never played a senior first team game for Villa, but played extensively for the reserves and captained the team until leaving in 2008.

=== United States ===
In June 2008 Earls left England for the United States when he signed with Rochester Rhinos of the USL First Division. He made his debut with the team in the Rhinos' 2–1 victory over RWB Adria in the 2008 Lamar Hunt U.S. Open Cup on 10 June 2008. On 29 July 2008, he was selected as the USL-1 Player of the Week.

Earls played 53 games with the Rochester Rhinos in two seasons, before signing with Major League Soccer side Colorado Rapids on 10 February 2010. During his time with Colorado he made 18 appearances and won MLS Cup. As a fan favorite he earned the nickname "Earls-B," a playful homage to the widely used Oral-B teeth whitening strips popularized by Crest during the era, a nickname earned in large part due to his tireless work rate and friendly demeanor. Earls was traded to Seattle Sounders FC, along with teammate Julien Baudet, on 22 November 2010. Earls was waived by Seattle on 1 March 2011. He subsequently resumed training with Colorado and re-signed with the Rapids on 30 March 2011. Colorado confirmed on 17 January 2012 that Earls would not return for the 2012 season after appearing in four matches for the Rapids during the 2011 season.

On 3 April 2012, Rochester Rhinos announced that the club re-signed Earls to a one-year deal. Following the 2013 season, Earls was named the Rhinos' team MVP.

Prior to the 2014 season, Earls signed with the Pittsburgh Riverhounds, also of the USL Pro. In his first season with the club, Earls appeared in and started 27 matches, tallying 1 goal and 6 assists. He finished the 2015 season with 3 goals and 3 assists in 25 league appearances.

On 3 June 2016 it was announced that the Riverhounds had resigned Earls for the remainder of the 2016 season. On 30 November 2017, Pittsburgh announced that Earls' contract had expired, ending his four-year spell with the club.

Having returned to his home town of Wicklow in 2018, Earls focused on his artwork and was commissioned by the Football Association of Ireland to produce programme covers for John O'Shea's testimonial match and an international friendly between the Republic of Ireland and Northern Ireland.

== Honours ==
Colorado Rapids

- Major League Soccer Eastern Conference Championship: 2010
- Major League Soccer MLS Cup: 2010
