= Nikola Katic =

Croatian football player (1986-)

Personal information
- Full name: Nikola Katic
- Date of birth: June 1, 1986 (age 40)
- Place of birth: Makarska, SFR Yugoslavia
- Height: 6 ft 0 in (1.83 m)
- Position: Defender

Youth career
- 2005–2006: ICC Cougars
- 2007–2008: Western Illinois Leathernecks

Senior career*
Years	Team	Apps	(Gls)
2007	Chicago Fire Premier	10	(0)
2008	Springfield Demize	9	(0)
2009–2014	Pittsburgh Riverhounds	72	(0)
- * Club domestic league appearances and goals as of September 16, 2014

Nikola Katic (born June 1, 1986 in Makarska) is a former Croatian footballer who currently is the assistant head coach for Pittsburgh Riverhounds SC in the USL.

== Career ==
=== College ===
Katic came to the United States from his native Croatia in 2005 to attend Illinois Central College, where he majored in marketing and was a two-year starter and captain. In 2006, he was honored as an NJCAA All American after he scored five goals and had eight assists.

In 2007, he transferred to Western Illinois University, where he was selected to the Comfort Inn & Suites All-Tournament Team, and was named the team's newcomer of the year. In 2008, Katic was named to the Country Inn Green Bay Nike Soccer Classic All Tournament team. He was also selected to the All-Summit League Second Team, named to the All-Summit league All-Tournament Team and to the NSCAA/Adidas All-Midwest Region Team.

During his college years Katic also played in the USL Premier Development League with both Chicago Fire Premier and Springfield Demize.

=== Professional ===
Katic turned professional in 2009 when he signed with the Pittsburgh Riverhounds upon their return to the USL Second Division. He made his professional debut on May 30, 2009, in a 3–1 win over the Wilmington Hammerheads.
