= Matthew Dallman =

American soccer player (born 1985)

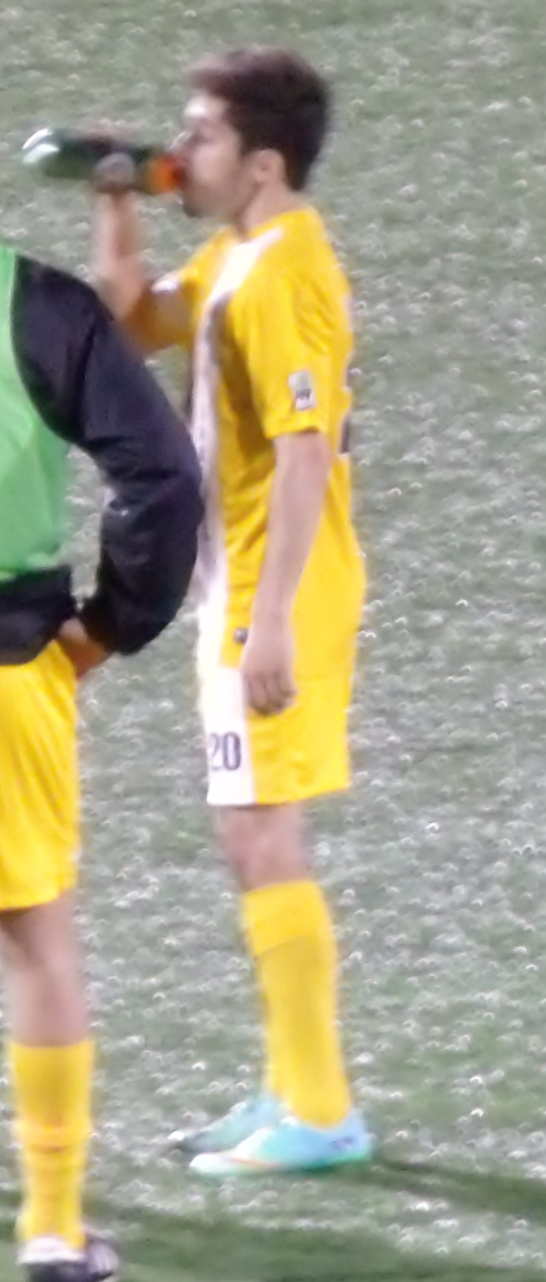
- Dallman with Riverhounds, 2014

Personal information
- Full name: Matthew Dallman
- Date of birth: March 9, 1985 (age 41)
- Place of birth: Portland, Oregon, United States
- Height: 5 ft 5 in (1.65 m)
- Position: Midfielder

Youth career
- 2002–2004: Westside Rangers
- 2004–2006: Portland Pilots

Senior career*
Years	Team	Apps	(Gls)
2006	Bradenton Academics	14	(2)
2007	Nordsjælland	0	(0)
2007–2008	SC Wiedenbrück	16	(0)
2008–2009	Arminia Bielefeld II	31	(8)
2009–2012	Sportfreunde Siegen	57	(8)
2012–2015	Pittsburgh Riverhounds	51	(2)
2011-2012	Chivas USA	2	(0)
- * Club domestic league appearances and goals as of September 16, 2014

Matthew Dallman (born March 9, 1985) is an American soccer player.

== Career ==
=== Youth, college and amateur ===
Dallman played high school soccer for Hood River Valley High School, playing on the varsity team for three seasons, earning a place on the second-team all-state squad as a senior. He then attended Chico State for a 1/2 year, but was a medical redshirt. In January 2004, he transferred to the University of Portland, where he was the team's fourth-leading scorer, with five goals and three assists. In 2005, Dallman started 17 games at midfield for the Pilots, recording a goal and four assists during the campaign. In 2006, he played in 19 games for Portland, leading the team in points with 10, with 2 goals and 6 assists.

Dallman also spent the 2006 season with Bradenton Academics in the USL Premier Development League where he made 14 appearances, recorded a league high 7 assists, and scored two goals.

=== Professional ===
Attempting to take advantage of his English heritage, Dallman set up multiple trials with European clubs following the close of the 2006 college season. He first went to Bolton Wanderers on February 15, 2007, to try and earn a spot with the FA Premier League club, before trying out for FC Nordsjælland and Bayern Munich II.

After completing his trials, and waiting for offers from clubs, Dallman decided to sign with FC Nordsjælland, formally agreeing to a contract on March 19, 2007. The deal was short-term, and kept him with the Danish club until the end of their season. He never received playing clearance from the league, and only played with their reserve squad.

Following his short stint with Nordsjælland, Dallman went on trial with Swedish side IF Bunkeflo. However, the two sides could not reach an agreement. Eventually, Dallman signed short-term with SC Wiedenbrück in Germany and appeared in 16 matches without scoring a goal before leaving the club. After trials with VfL Wolfsburg and Bolton Wanderers, Dallman agreed to a two-year deal with German Bundesliga club Arminia Bielefeld where he made 31 appearances and scored eight goals for their second team. He then moved to Sportfreunde Siegen and spent two and a half seasons with the club before returning to the United States in January 2012.

Dallman returned to the United States and was invited into training camp by Major League Soccer club Chivas USA with an opportunity at earning a roster spot. Dallman joined Chivas, and made several appearances, but suffered a hamstring injury early in the 2012 season which resulted in his release from Chivas. Dallman then joined USL Pro club Pittsburgh Riverhounds. He made his debut for the club on July 27, 2012, in a 4–1 victory over Antigua Barracuda. In total, Dallman appeared in 4 matches, tallying 1 assist in 314 minutes, after joining the club near the end of the 2012 season.

For the 2013 USL Pro season, Dallman appeared in 23 of 26 regular season matches for the Riverhounds and became a central figure in the offense. In total, he scored two goals and tallied 12 assists meaning that he assisted on exactly one third of Pittsburgh's 36 goals for the season. His 12 assist total was enough to put him tops in the league in that category for the season and set the all-time record for assists in a single season in the process. With 16 points, Dallman was also 21st in the league in that statistic. Dallman also holds the current all time assist record in the USL-Pro.

== Personal life ==
Dallman's father played soccer for Portland State, and his great-grandfather, Roderick Welsh, played professionally for Portsmouth and Port Vale of the English First Division.

== Honors ==
- USL Pro single season assist record (12, in 2013)
- USL Pro All-League First Team: 2013
