= Sterling Flunder =

American soccer player

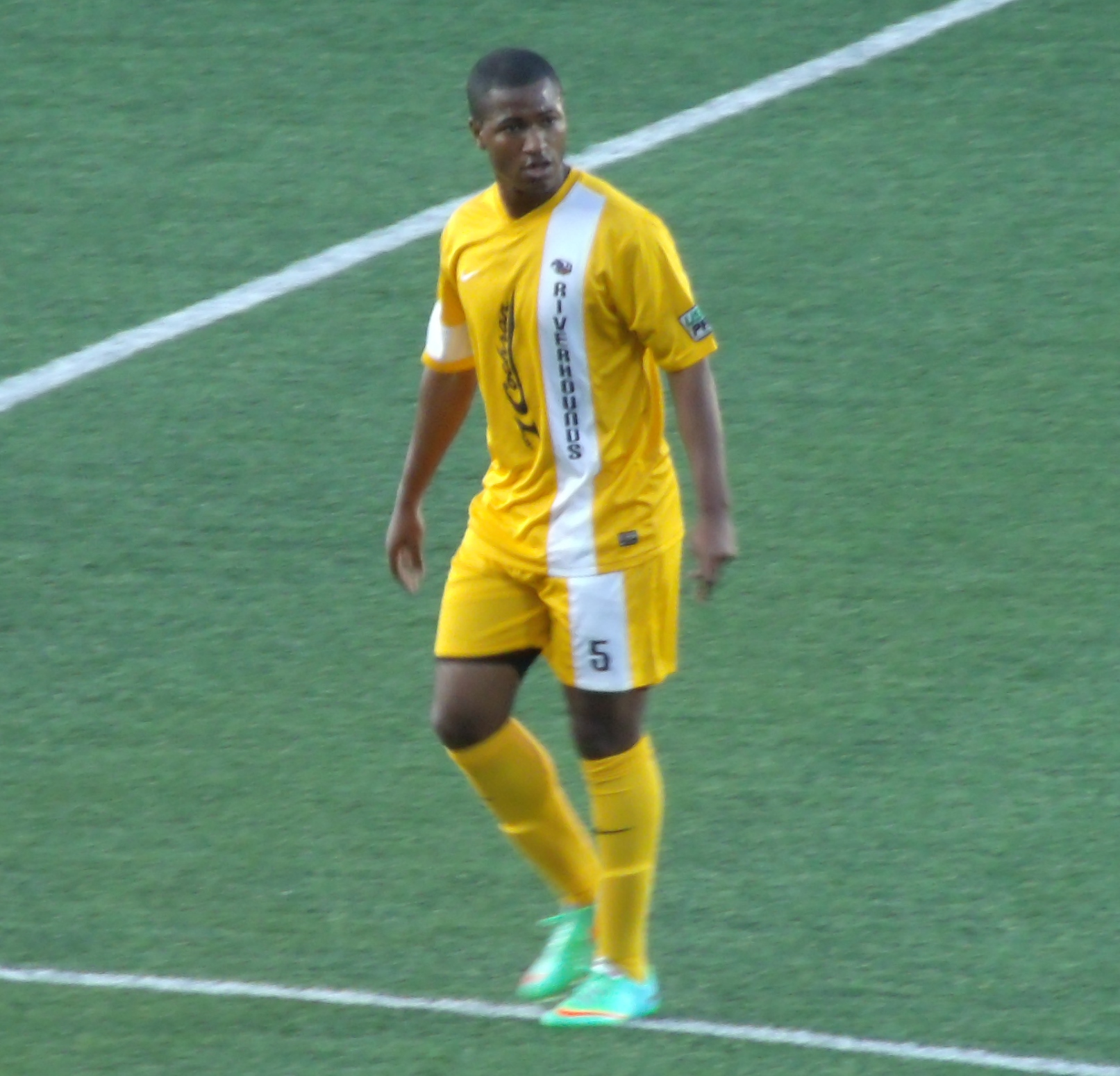
- Flunder with Riverhounds, 2014

Personal information
- Full name: Sterling Flunder
- Date of birth: February 14, 1986 (age 40)
- Place of birth: Bothell, Washington, U.S.
- Height: 5 ft 11 in (1.80 m)
- Positions: Defender; midfielder

Youth career
- Snohomish United
- Sandpoint Strikers

College career
Years	Team	Apps	(Gls)
2004	Spokane Bigfoot		
2005–2008	Marshall Thundering Herd		

Senior career*
Years	Team	Apps	(Gls)
2008	West Virginia Chaos	16	(0)
2009	Portland Timbers U23s	15	(1)
2010–2015	Pittsburgh Riverhounds	123	(2)
- * Club domestic league appearances and goals as of 20:23, 24 February 2016 (UTC)

Sterling Flunder (born February 14, 1986) is an American retired soccer player who last played for Pittsburgh Riverhounds in the USL.

== Career ==
=== College and amateur ===
Flunder played club soccer for Snohomish United and the Sandpoint Strikers, was a three-time Washington State ODP team player, and played one year of college soccer at Spokane Community College, before moving to Marshall University prior to his sophomore season. With the Herd he was named to the C-USA second team and the C-USA All-Tournament team as a sophomore, and earned All-Conference Third team honors as a junior.

During his college years Flunder also played with West Virginia Chaos and Portland Timbers U23s in the USL Premier Development League.

=== Professional ===
Flunder turned professional in 2010 when he signed for the Pittsburgh Riverhounds of the USL Second Division. He made his professional debut on May 15, 2010, in a game against Charleston Battery. Flunder played for the team until February 2016 when he officially announced his retirement from playing so that he could lead one of the club's academies full-time. Over the course of six seasons, he made 123 league appearances for the club, ranking among the highest players all-time in that category.
