= Kevin Kerr (Scottish footballer) =

Scottish footballer (born 1989)

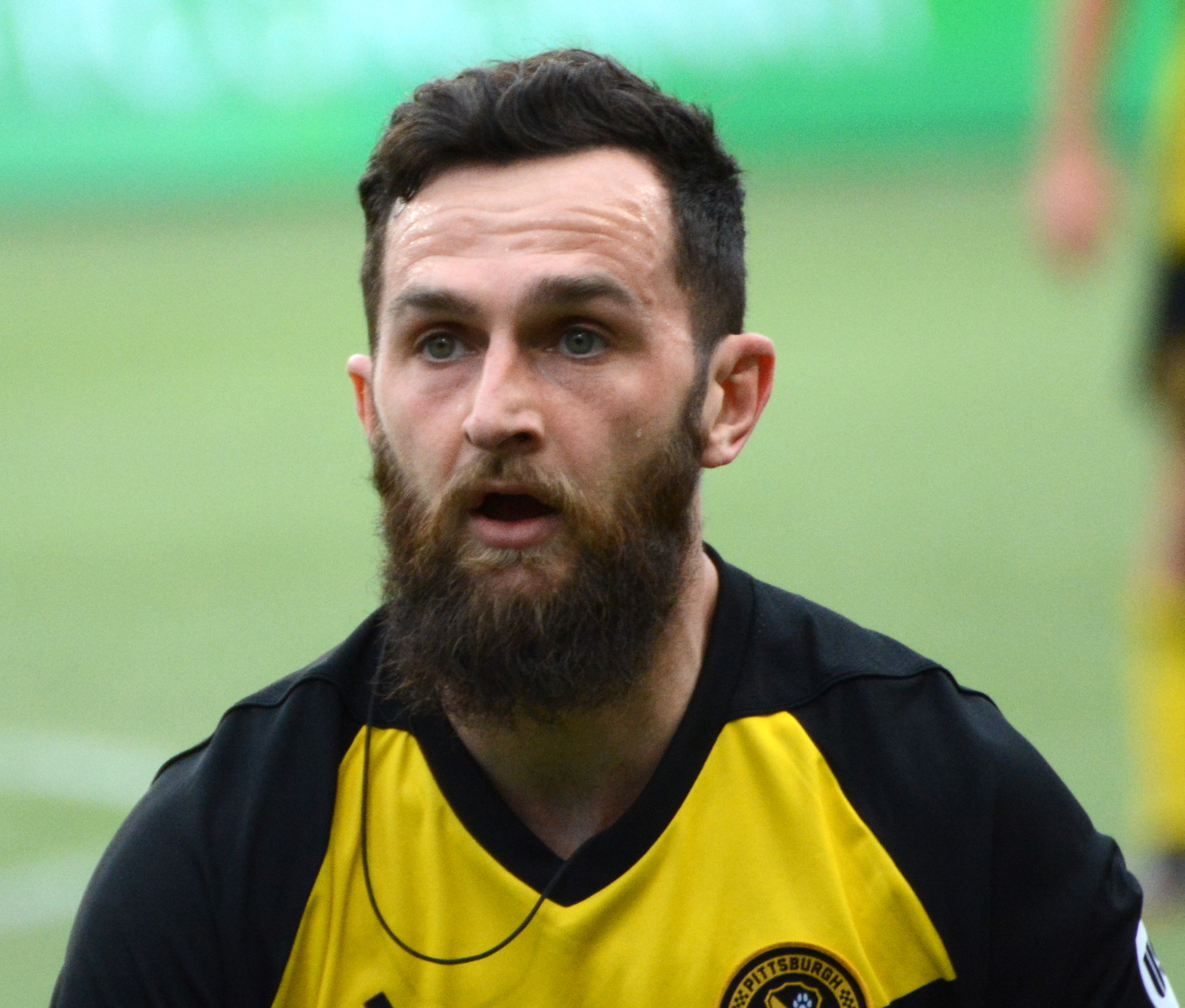
- Kerr playing for Pittsburgh Riverhounds in 2018

Personal information
- Date of birth: 12 January 1989 (age 37)
- Place of birth: Münster, West Germany
- Position: Midfielder

Youth career
- –2003: VfL Theesen
- 2003–2008: Arminia Bielefeld

Senior career*
Years	Team	Apps	(Gls)
2008–2011	Arminia Bielefeld II	42	(8)
2009–2011	Arminia Bielefeld	15	(0)
2012	AGOVV	15	(3)
2012	SC Wiedenbrück	19	(4)
2013–2019	Pittsburgh Riverhounds SC	178	(29)
Total		269	(44)

International career
2009	Scotland U21	2	(0)
- * Club domestic league appearances and goals

Kevin Kerr (born 12 January 1989) is a former professional footballer who played as a midfielder. Born in Germany, he made two appearances for the Scotland U21 national team.

== Biography ==
Kerr is the son of a Scottish serviceman of the British forces in Germany and an English mother. For the most part he grew up in Bielefeld where he started his football career.

== Club career ==
Having played for the amateur club VfL Theesen in Bielefeld, he switched to the Arminia Bielefeld youth team in summer 2003. On 7 January 2009, he signed a professional contract with Arminia Bielefeld until 2011. He also still played for the second team.

On 20 March 2010, Kerr made his debut in the 2. Bundesliga during the Ostwestfalen derby. He signed for AGOVV Apeldoorn of Netherlands' Eerste Divisie in January 2012 after his contract in Bielefeld had expired the previous summer.

After AGOVV Apeldoorn declared bankruptcy and all its players became free agents, Kerr returned to Germany and played 19 matches and scored 4 goals for SC Wiedenbrück of the Fußball-Regionalliga West.

On 2 April 2013, after leaving SC Wiedenbrück, Kerr signed with the Pittsburgh Riverhounds of the USL Pro, the third tier of the United States soccer league system. He made his Riverhounds debut on 13 April 2013 in a 2–1 defeat to the Harrisburg City Islanders, the first match ever held at Highmark Stadium. On the next matchday, Kerr scored his first goal for the Riverhounds in a 2–1 defeat to the Dayton Dutch Lions.

Following his first two seasons with the club, in which he made 47 appearances and registered five goals and two assists, Kerr signed a new contract to remain at the club for the 2015 USL Pro season. During the first game of the season, Kerr recorded his first hat trick for the club in a 5–2 victory over in-state rivals the Harrisburg City Islanders. In total, Kerr tallied a career-high ten goals and nine assists in 26 league matches during the 2015 USL season.

On 29 June 2019, Kerr recorded two assists against Birmingham Legion FC. His first assist, his 26th for the Riverhounds, set a new all-time record for the club in that statistic.

On 23 January 2020, Kerr officially announced his retirement and joined the Riverhounds' Academy full-time staff.

== International career ==
In early 2009, Kerr was called into training camp for the Scotland national under-21 football team by Billy Stark for the first time after stating his desire to represent Scotland. Kerr spurned opportunities to join German youth national team camps in order to represent Scotland. When he was 16, a letter inviting Kerr to join up with the Scottish team was sent to him but the club team to which it was sent said that it never received the letter.
