= José Angulo =

Colombian footballer (born 1988)

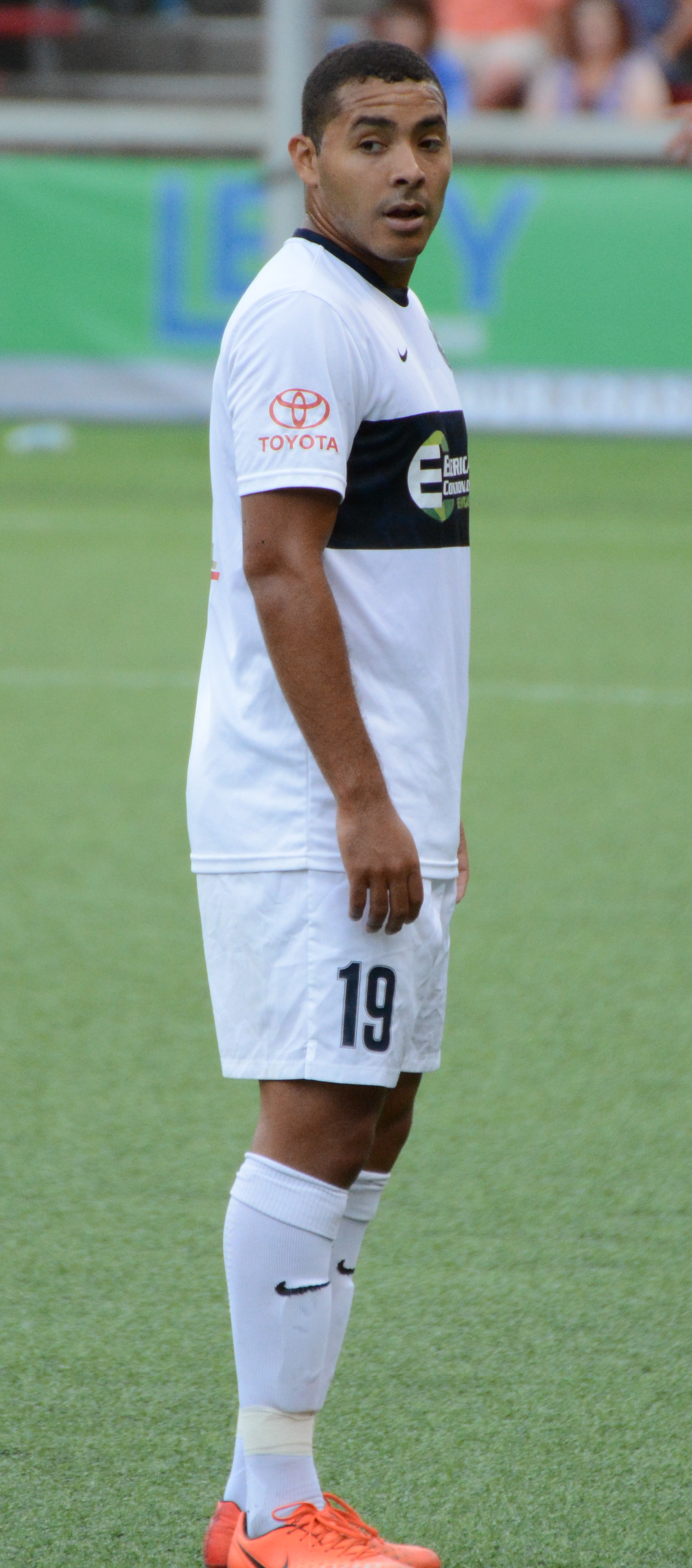
- Angulo with Saint Louis in 2017

Personal information
- Full name: José Angulo
- Date of birth: 13 January 1988 (age 38)
- Place of birth: Barranquilla, Colombia
- Height: 1.81 m (5 ft 11 in)
- Position: Forward

Senior career*
| Years | Team | Apps | (Gls) |
| 2008 | New England Revolution | 0 | (0) |
| 2009 | Newark Ironbound Express | 1 | (0) |
| 2010 | Central Jersey Spartans | 11 | (10) |
| 2011 | Harrisburg City Islanders | 24 | (9) |
| 2012 | New York Red Bulls | 0 | (0) |
| 2013–2014 | Pittsburgh Riverhounds | 47 | (23) |
| 2015–2016 | Fort Lauderdale Strikers | 47 | (11) |
| 2017 | Saint Louis FC | 12 | (4) |
| 2017 | → Oklahoma City Energy (loan) | 16 | (11) |
| 2018 | Oklahoma City Energy | 4 | (0) |
| 2019 | Hartford Athletic | 29 | (6) |
| 2021 | New Amsterdam | 7 | (1) |
- * Club domestic league appearances and goals as of 19 June 2021

José Angulo (born 13 January 1988) is a former Colombian professional footballer who played as a forward. He is the current Head of Scout and Manager of Youth Partnerships for USL League One club New York Cosmos

== Career ==
=== Youth ===
Angulo grew up in Paterson, New Jersey, the son of Jose "El Perilla" Angulo, who had a 10-year professional career in Colombia. Angulo attended Saint Benedict's Preparatory School, where he was a teammate of fellow professional Nelson Becerra. He was a Parade Magazine All-American at St. Benedict's, and was widely regarded as one of the best high school players in the country.

=== Professional ===
Angulo turned professional straight out of high school but despite numerous trials, including Hannover 96, Lazio, Penafiel, he was unable to secure a professional contract due to visa issues. Returning to the United States in January 2008, his rights were assigned to New England Revolution through the Major League Soccer discovery claim process. Angulo eventually signed with New England in autumn.

He played only one game for the Newark Ironbound Express in the USL Premier Development League in 2009, and scored 10 goals for the Central Jersey Spartans in 2010, before finally signing his first professional contract in 2011 which he signed with the Harrisburg City Islanders of the USL Professional Division.

He made his professional debut on 23 April in a 1–0 loss to the Pittsburgh Riverhounds, and scored his first professional goal on 7 May in a 1–1 tie with F.C. New York. In his first year with Harrisburg City, Angulo was the club's top scorer with 9 goals in 26 matches.

On 5 March 2012 it was announced that Angulo had agreed to terms with New York Red Bulls of Major League Soccer. Eight months later, New York declined his contract option, making him a free agent. During his time with Red Bulls, Angulo only made one appearance, coming in as a substitute in a friendly against Tottenham Hotspur on 31 July 2012.

On 3 April 2013, Angulo returned to USL Pro by signing for the Pittsburgh Riverhounds. Angulo had a breakout season with Pittsburgh. His performances included a 5-game scoring streak which saw him recognized as the USL Pro Player of the Week for week 14 of the 2013 USL Pro season. He also scored in a friendly match against reigning FA Cup winners Wigan Athletic on 19 July 2013. On the final match-day of the 2013 regular season, Angulo scored his 15th goal of the season, tying the goal tally of Dom Dwyer. Angulo was crowned league scoring champion on total points, 34 to 31, due to his four assists versus Dwyer's one. At the time, the 15 goals scored set the single season USL Pro scoring record. At the end of the season, Angulo was named USL Pro league MVP.

On 29 October 2013, it was announced that Angulo signed a 2-year contract extension with the Riverhounds despite strong belief that he would attract interest from clubs in Major League Soccer or other higher divisions during the offseason. Angulo scored the Riverhounds' only goal in their opening match of the 2014 season in a 1–1 draw versus Orlando City.

The Fort Lauderdale Strikers announced the signing of Angulo on 10 February 2015. On 22 December 2016, he signed for Saint Louis FC.

Angulo was officially loaned to fellow USL side OKC Energy on 11 July 2017. As part of the deal, Saint Louis acquired Daniel Jackson in a permanent addition.

On 18 December 2018, Angulo joined USL side Hartford Athletic ahead of their inaugural 2019 season.

In early 2021, Angulo signed with National Independent Soccer Association side New Amsterdam FC ahead of the Spring 2021 season.

== Honors ==
- USL Pro MVP: 2013
- USL Pro Golden Boot: 2013 (joint with Dom Dwyer)
- USL Pro Scoring Champion: 2013
- Former USL Pro Single-season goal scoring record: 15 (2013)
- USL Pro All-League First Team: 2013
