= Rob Vincent =

English footballer and coach

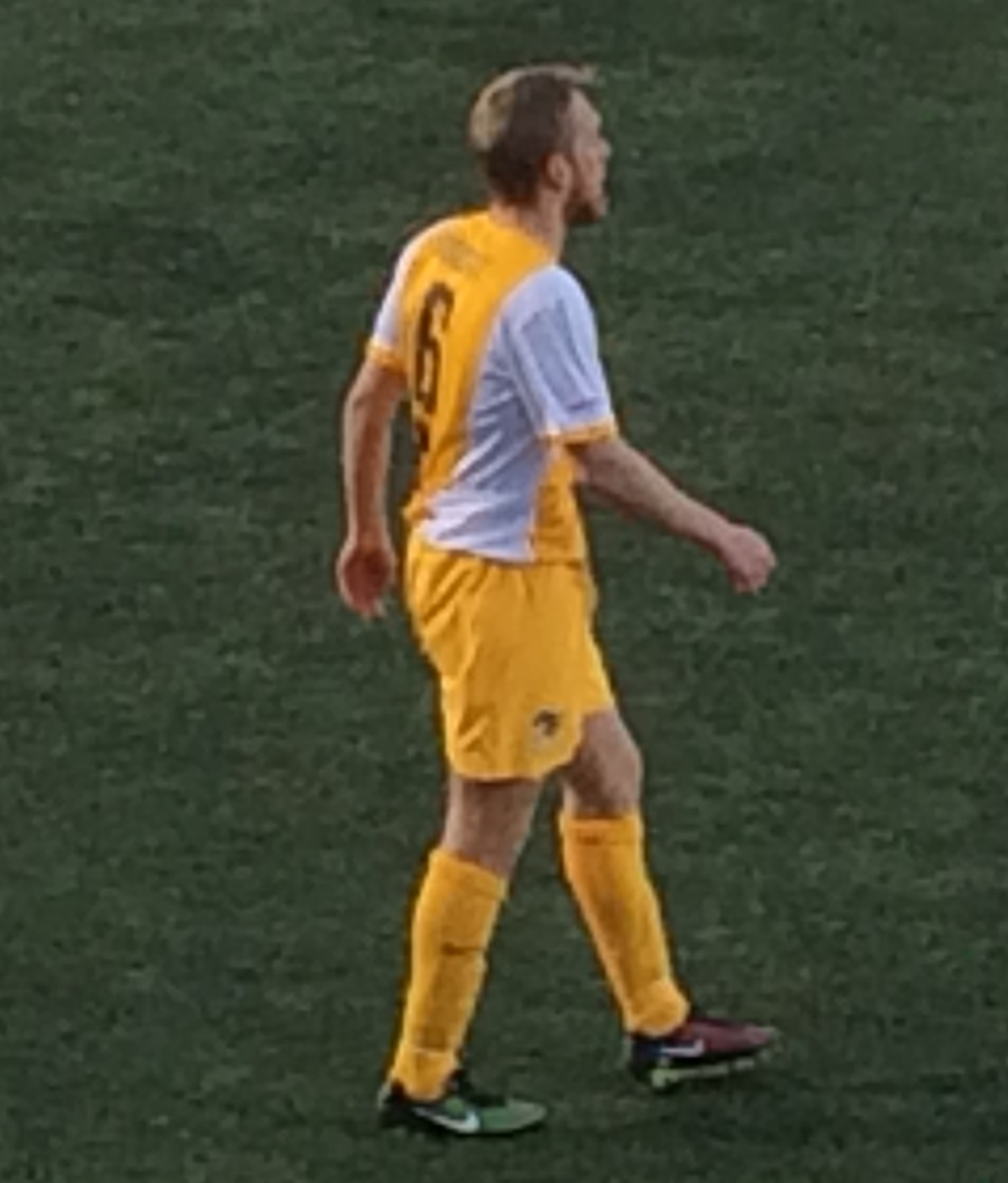
- Vincent with Riverhounds, 2015

Personal information
- Full name: Robert Vincent
- Date of birth: 26 October 1990 (age 36)
- Place of birth: Liverpool, England
- Positions: Midfielder; forward

Youth career
- 1997–2000: Everton
- 2000–2005: Crewe Alexandra
- 2005–2009: Stockport County

College career
Years	Team	Apps	(Gls)
2009–2012	Charleston Golden Eagles	80	(36)

Senior career*
Years	Team	Apps	(Gls)
2010–2011	West Virginia Chaos	23	(11)
2012	Carolina Dynamo	2	(0)
2013–2015	Pittsburgh Riverhounds	78	(24)
2016–2017	D.C. United	22	(2)
2016	→ Pittsburgh Riverhounds (loan)	1	(1)

Managerial career
- 2018–2023: Pittsburgh Riverhounds (academy)
- 2024–2025: Pittsburgh Riverhounds (assistant)
- 2025: Pittsburgh Riverhounds (interim)
- 2026–: Pittsburgh Riverhounds
- * Club domestic league appearances and goals as of 19 December 2025

Rob Vincent (born 26 October 1990) is an English former footballer. He is currently the head coach for the Pittsburgh Riverhounds in USL Championship.

== Career ==
=== Youth ===
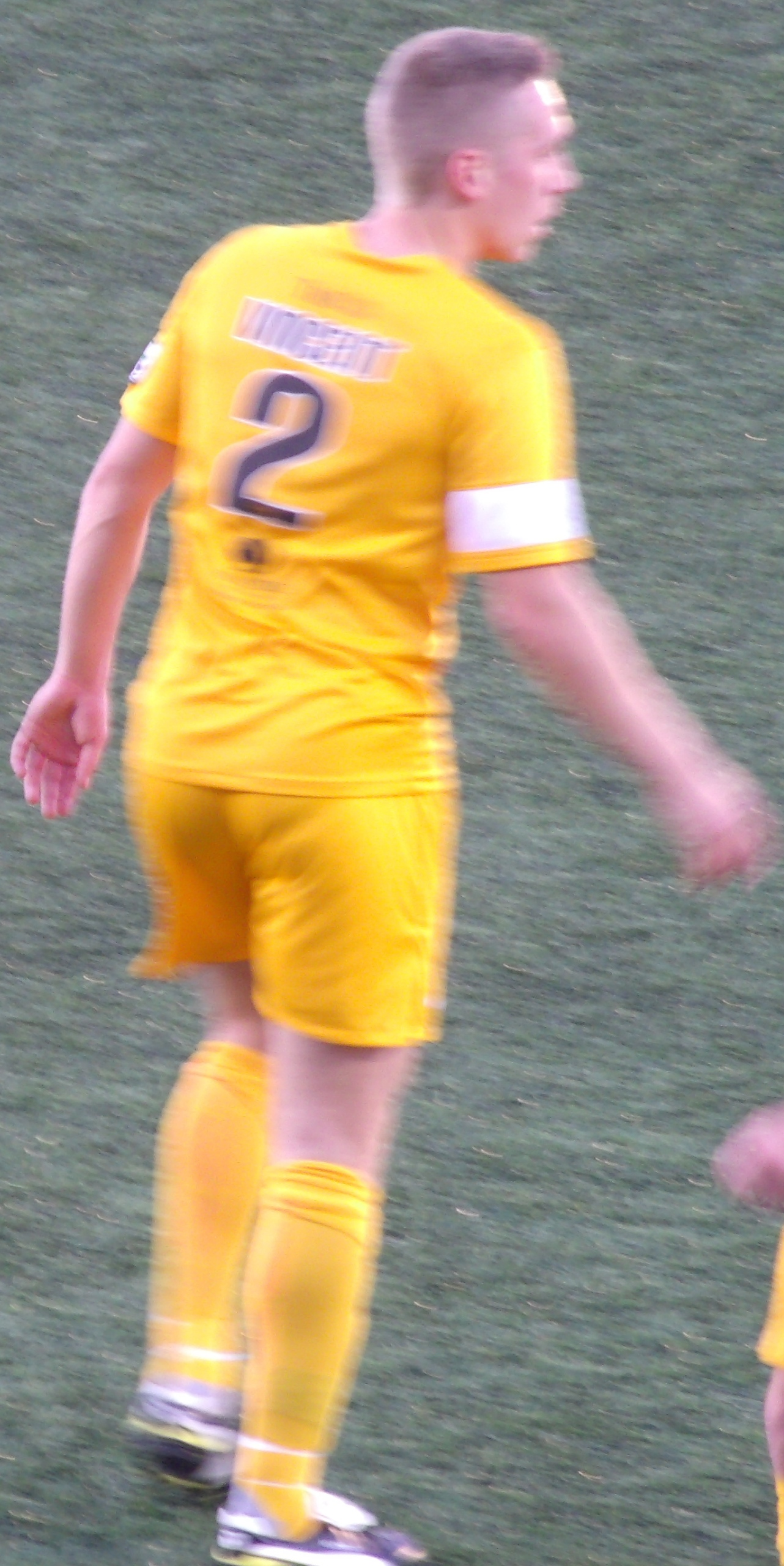
Vincent in 2014

Vincent spent time with Everton and Crewe Alexandra as a youth from 1997 to 2000 and 2000–2005, respectively. He played for the Stockport County youth academy from 2005 to 2009, contributing eight goals until injury in pre-season 2008. At the end of his youth contract, he was not offered a professional contract, and moved on to study for a degree while playing college soccer in the United States.

=== College and amateur ===
Vincent played for the University of Charleston where he was named the 2009 WVIAC Freshman of the Year. He became a team captain for the Golden Eagles in the 2010 season. During his time at UC, Vincent was part of a team that won 4 consecutive conference titles, and went to the NCAA Division II National Tournament on 3 occasions. In his time at UC, he scored 9 goals in each of his 4 years; a total of 36 career goals as well as 25 assists. Vincent won Conference Player of the Year honours in 2010 and 2012. He also was named as a Division II All-American in each of his four years at UC.

Vincent signed with the West Virginia Chaos of the USL Premier Development League, the fourth level of the United States soccer pyramid, in 2010 after an impressive freshman campaign at UC. However, he struggled with injury for much of the season and only played in 7 games, contributing 2 goals.

He returned to the Chaos for the 2011 season, this time as the youngest team captain in the franchise history. He played every minute of the 16 league games, scoring 9 goals and adding 6 assists along the way.

In 2012, he trained with Michigan Bucks before transferring to Carolina Dynamo, also of the PDL. In his one season with the club, Vincent played a total of 72 minutes in two appearances.

Following his professional retirement, Vincent continues to play amateur soccer for Tartan Devils FC.

=== Professional ===
==== Pittsburgh Riverhounds ====
During his final semester of college, Vincent contacted the Pittsburgh Riverhounds requesting a trial. After impressing the coaching staff during pre-season, Vincent signed a professional contract with the Riverhounds in April 2013. Although he did not appear in the match, Vincent was on the bench for the season opener against the Richmond Kickers on 6 April 2013. Vincent made his first professional appearance, coming on as a late substitute in the Riverhounds' 1–2 defeat at Dayton Dutch Lions. Vincent scored his first professional goal on 23 June 2013 in a 4–1 victory over Antigua Barracuda. He scored his second goal on 2 August 2013 in a 2–1 victory over VSI Tampa Bay FC. Vincent finished his rookie season with three goals and one assist, participating in 23 of the club's 26 league matches.

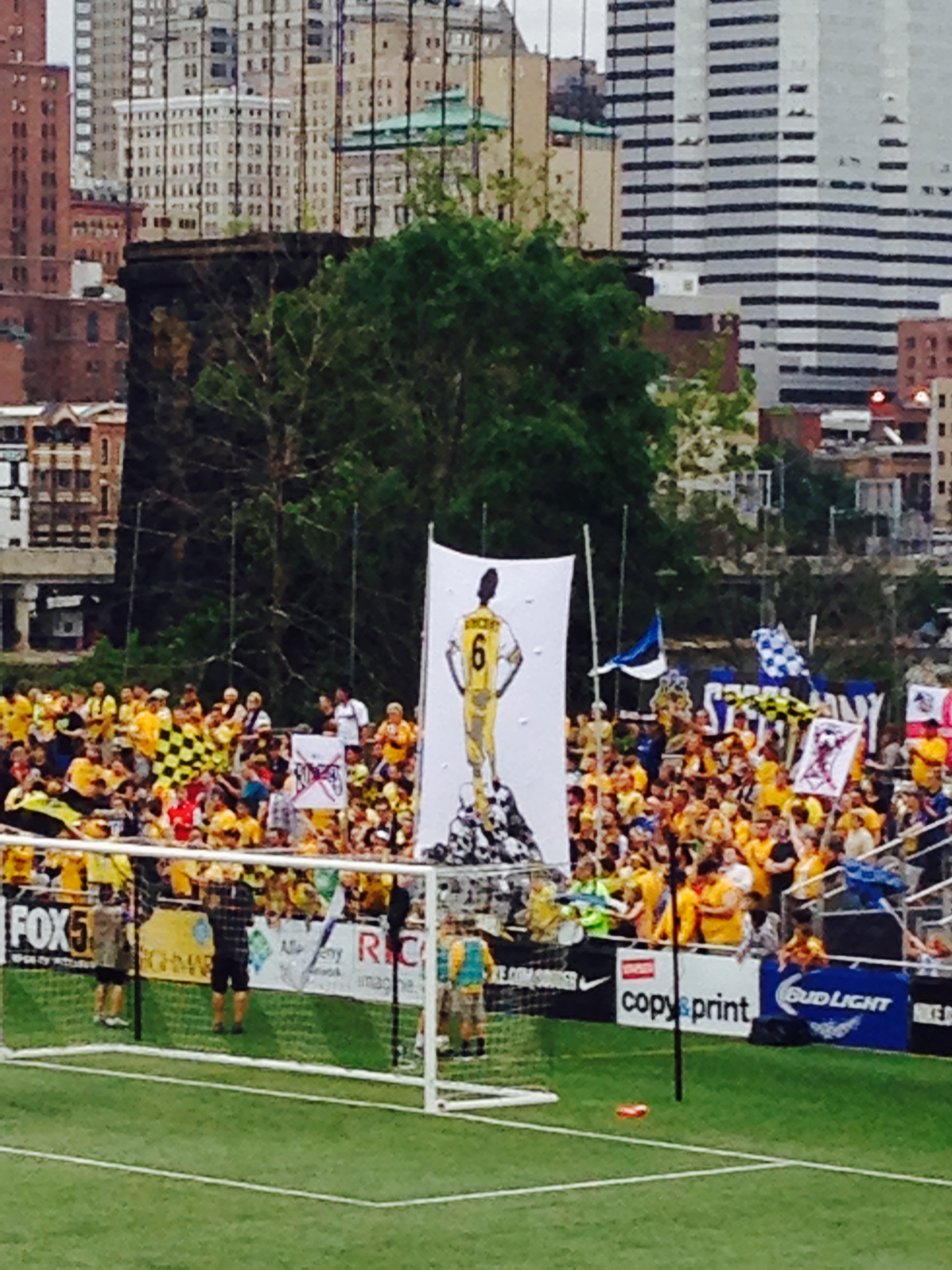
Tifo honouring Vincent during the 2015 US Open Cup match against D.C. United

On 14 March 2014, it was announced that Vincent would be returning for the 2014 USL Pro season after an impressive rookie campaign. About resigning Vincent, Riverhounds head coach Justin Evans said, "Robbie Vincent has had the most impressive off-season body of work that I have seen in a very long time...I am excited to see how this work will translate onto the playing field throughout the season." During Vincent's second year with the club, he again scored three goals and tallied an assist in 28 league matches.

Before the 2015 USL season, it was announced that Vincent had signed a contract extensive which would see him remain at the club through the 2016 season. During the 2015 preseason, Vincent scored three goals in the Riverhounds' first two matches. Vincent then scored a hat-trick in Pittsburgh final preseason match, a 5–1 victory over the Charleston Golden Eagles, his alma mater. He continued his impressive performances into the regular season, tallying two goals and two assists in Pittsburgh's 5-2 opening day victory over the Harrisburg City Islanders. On matchday six, Vincent scored another brace, this time against Toronto FC II, earning him league Team of the Week honors as the Riverhounds earned the 5–1 victory. Vincent was named to the Team of the Week again the following week after his third 2-goal match of the season against New York Red Bulls II. Vincent's six goals made him the league leader in goals at that time. Vincent scored the team's game-winning goal of a 3–0 victory over the West Virginia Chaos on 20 May 2015 to open Pittsburgh's 2015 Lamar Hunt U.S. Open Cup campaign. In the next round, Vincent scored the game-winner again, this time in stoppage time, as the Riverhounds defeated the Tampa Bay Rowdies of the North American Soccer League 1–0, setting up an encounter with D.C. United of Major League Soccer at Highmark Stadium in the fourth round. Three days later on 30 May 2015, Vincent scored his fourth brace of the season in what a columnist called the "club's greatest ever game" as the team scored three goals in stoppage time for a 6–5 victory over the Harrisburg City Islanders. Vincent's goals included the team's first tally to begin the comeback from three goals down and the game-tying goal in stoppage time. For his performance, Vincent was named the USL Player of the Week. On 17 June 2015, Vincent scored his third goal in his third U.S. Open Cup match of the year. Vincent converted the penalty to draw level with D.C. United 1–1 but the team would ultimately lose 1–3 after D.C. scored two goals in the two extra periods. On 1 August 2016, Vincent scored his first competitive professional hat-trick as the Riverhounds defeated the Wilmington Hammerheads 3–0. With the three goals, Vincent returned to the top of the league scoring charts with 16 goals in 20 league matches. His 16-goal total put him within four goals of the USL single-season scoring record of 20 set by Kevin Molino the previous season. Vincent was named the USL Player of the Week for the second time following his three-goal performance against the Hammerheads. With 17 goals, Vincent moved into the top five single-season scorers in league history with five matches remaining in the season. Vincent ultimately finished the season as the league's third highest scorer with 18 goals, despite playing in the midfield. He was later named a member of the USL All-League first team for the 2015 season.

In the 2015 off season, Vincent went on trial with D.C. United of Major League Soccer. The week-long training stint ended without a contract offer. However, in January 2016 Vincent was on trial with the club again as part of its preseason work ahead of the 2016 season. He featured in United's first match of the preseason, a 0–1 defeat to IF Elfsborg of the Allsvenskan, the top flight of Swedish football.

==== D.C. United ====
On 17 February 2016, it was announced that D.C. United and the Riverhounds had completed a transfer for Vincent. Terms of the deal were undisclosed. Vincent had made 88 appearances and scored 28 goals in all competition during his time in Pittsburgh. His 24 league goals made him the team's top scorer in the modern USL era (since 2011) at that time. Vincent made his competitive debut for D.C. United on 23 February, in a 0–2 loss against Querétaro F.C. in the CONCACAF Champions League. He came on as a 57th-minute substitute for Chris Rolfe.

On 25 May 2016 it was announced that Vincent was loaned back to the Riverhounds for one match, a 4 June contest against the Charleston Battery. He scored the Riverhounds' only goal of the 1–2 defeat and was named the Player of the Game for his performance.

Vincent scored his first goal for D.C. United on 16 September 2016, in a 2–2 draw against the Chicago Fire. Vincent finished the 2016 MLS season with 20 appearances and 2 goals, including starting the last 10 regular season games as D.C. United made a late push into the playoffs. He made his first MLS playoff appearance in a season ending 2–4 loss to Montreal Impact on 27 October 2016.

In 2017, he suffered a knee injury in the second match of the season against New York City FC at Yankee Stadium on 12 March 2017. He subsequently underwent surgery but suffered a blood clot during recovery. He ultimately missed the remainder of the 2017 season. On 28 November 2017 his contract option with United was declined.

== Coaching career ==
In March 2018 Vincent announced his retirement from football as a result of his last knee injury. He was immediately announced as a coach for the Riverhounds SC academy. Vincent holds a USSF A-Senior License.

Following several seasons with the Riverhounds Academy, Vincent joined the first team staff ahead of the 2024 USL Championship season. He replaces Dan Visser, who had been recently named as the club's new Sporting Director.

== Personal ==
Vincent holds a U.S. green card which qualifies him as a domestic player for MLS roster purposes.

== Career statistics ==
As of 4 June 2016

Appearances and goals by club, season and competition
Club	Season	League			Cup		Continental		Total	
Club	Season	Division	Apps	Goals	Apps	Goals	Apps	Goals	Apps	Goals
West Virginia Chaos	2010	Premier Development League	7	2	0	0	0	0	7	2
West Virginia Chaos	2011	Premier Development League	16	9	0	0	0	0	16	9
West Virginia Chaos	Total		23	11	0	0	0	0	23	11
Carolina Dynamo	2012	Premier Development League	2	0	0	0	0	0	2	0
Pittsburgh Riverhounds	2013	United Soccer League	23	3	2	0	0	0	25	3
Pittsburgh Riverhounds	2014	United Soccer League	28	3	3	1	0	0	31	4
Pittsburgh Riverhounds	2015	United Soccer League	27	18	3	3	0	0	30	21
Pittsburgh Riverhounds	Total		78	24	8	4	0	0	86	28
D.C. United	2016	Major League Soccer	19	2	0	0	2	0	21	2
D.C. United	2017	Major League Soccer	2	0	0	0	0	0	2	0
D.C. United	Total		21	2	0	0	2	0	23	2
Pittsburgh Riverhounds (loan)	2016	United Soccer League	1	1	0	0	0	0	1	1
Career total			125	38	8	4	2	0	135	42

== Coaching stats ==
Team	From	To	Record				
Team	From	To	G	W	L	T	Win %
Pittsburgh Riverhounds SC	October 10, 2025	Present	7	3	0	4	71.43

== Honours ==
=== Player ===
- USL All-League Team: 2015

=== Manager ===
- USL Championship Title: 2025
- USL Championship Eastern Conference: 2025
