= 2012 Harrisburg City Islanders season =

Harrisburg City Islanders
2012 season
- Owner: Eric Pettis
- Head coach: Bill Becher
- Stadium: Skyline Sports Complex
- USL Pro: 6th
- USL Pro Playoffs: Quarterfinals
- U.S. Open Cup: Quarterfinals
- Top goalscorer: Lucky Mkosana (7)
Home colors	Away colors

The 2012 Harrisburg City Islanders season was the club's ninth season of competitive soccer - its ninth season in the third division of American soccer and its second season in the USL Professional Division; the City Islanders being one of the original 10 founder-members.

City Islanders finished the 2012 USL Pro season by finishing sixth in the table, good enough for a berth into the 2012 USL Pro Playoffs, marking their second-consecutive season of postseason play. However, in the first round, Harrisburg suffered a 2–1 defeat at Charleston Battery thus, ending their postseason ambitions.

== Roster ==
No.	Position	Nation	Player
0	GK	USA	Avery Steinlage
1	GK	USA	Nick Noble
2	DF	USA	Bilal Duckett
3	DF	USA	Dustin Bixler
4	DF	USA	Adrian LeRoy
5	DF	USA	Andrew Marshall
6	MF	USA	Colin Zizzi
7	MF	FRA	Yann Ekra
8	FW	KEN	Brian Ombiji
9	FW	USA	Garret Pettis
11	DF	USA	Tom Brandt
12	MF	USA	Andrew Welker
13	DF	USA	Stephen Basso
14	MF	ENG	Tom Mellor
15	MF	USA	Morgan Langley
16	DF	USA	J.T. Noone
17	FW	ZIM	Lucky Mkosana
20	FW	GAM	Sainey Touray
22	MF	USA	Jason Pelletier
23	MF	USA	Drew Yates
—	FW	USA	Chandler Hoffman (on loan from Philadelphia Union)
—	FW	FRA	Antoine Hoppenot (on loan from Philadelphia Union)
—	MF	USA	Greg Jordan (on loan from Philadelphia Union)
—	MF	USA	Jimmy McLaughlin (on loan from Philadelphia Union)

== Transfers ==
=== In ===
Date	Player	Number	Position	Previous club	Fee/notes
	(United States) Avery Steinlage	0	GK	(United States) Indiana Invaders	
	(United States) Nick Noble	1	GK	(Sweden) Ljungskile SK	
	(United States) Bilal Duckett	2	DF	(Canada) Vancouver Whitecaps	
	(United States) Adrian LeRoy	4	DF	(Canada) FC Edmonton	
	(United States) Colin Zizzi	6	MF	(Spain) Vallecas CF	
	(France) Yann Ekra	7	MF	(France) LB Châteauroux	
	(United States) Garret Pettis	9	FW	(United States) Lipscomb Bisons	
	(United States) Tom Brandt	11	DF	(United States) Penn Quakers	
	(United States) Tom Mellor	14	DF	(United States) Michigan Bucks	

=== Out ===
Date	Player	Number	Position	Destination club	Fee/notes
February 2012	(United States) Brian Ackley		FW	(United States) Carolina Railhawks	
March 5, 2012	(Colombia) José Angulo		FW	(United States) New York Red Bulls	
	(United States) Phil Tuttle	1	GK	(United States) Wilmington Hammerheads	
	(United States) Geoff Bloes	4	MF	Retired	
	(United States) Jeritt Thayer	6	FW	Retired	
	(United States) Jason Herrick	9	FW	Retired	
	(England) David Schofield	10	MF	(United States) Harrisburg Heat	
	(United States) Jason Hotchkin	11	MF	Retired	
	(Peru) Nelson Becerra	17	MF	(United States) Icon FC	
	(United States) Anthony Calvano	23	DF	(United States) Pittsburgh Riverhounds	

=== Loan in ===
Date	Player	Number	Position	Previous club	Fee/notes
April 20, 2012	(United States) Chandler Hoffman	-	FW	(United States) Philadelphia Union	Temporary Loan
April 20, 2012	(France) Antoine Hoppenot	-	FW	(United States) Philadelphia Union	Temporary Loan
July 19, 2012	(United States) Greg Jordan	-	MF	(United States) Philadelphia Union	Temporary Loan
July 19, 2012	(United States) Jimmy McLaughlin	-	MF	(United States) Philadelphia Union	Temporary Loan

== Competitions ==
=== USL Pro ===
==== League table ====
Pos	Team	Pld	W	T	L	GF	GA	GD	Pts	Qualification
1	Orlando City SC (C)	24	17	6	1	50	18	+32	57	Commissioner's Cup, Playoffs 1st round bye
2	Rochester Rhinos (A)	24	12	5	7	27	23	+4	41	Playoffs 1st round bye
3	Charleston Battery (A)	24	12	2	10	36	26	+10	38	Playoffs
4	Richmond Kickers (A)	24	11	5	8	31	27	+4	38	Playoffs
5	Wilmington Hammerheads (A)	24	10	7	7	34	32	+2	37	Playoffs
6	Harrisburg City Islanders (A)	24	10	7	7	34	29	+5	37	Playoffs
7	Charlotte Eagles	24	11	3	10	34	26	+8	36	
8	Los Angeles Blues	24	9	3	12	26	29	−3	30	
9	Dayton Dutch Lions	24	4	10	10	20	29	−9	22	
10	Pittsburgh Riverhounds	24	4	5	15	20	39	−19	17	
11	Antigua Barracuda	24	5	1	18	16	50	−34	16	

Source: USL Pro official standings
Rules for classification: Points, then tiebreak: 1) Head-to-head record based on total points in League games, 2) Total wins in League games, 3) Goal difference in League games, 4) Goals scored in League games, etc.
(A) Advances to USL Pro Playoffs; (C) Commissioner's Cup (best regular season record)

==== Results ====
All times in Eastern Time.

April 20 1	Charlotte Eagles	1–2	Harrisburg City Islanders	Charlotte, North Carolina
19:00	Salles 35' (yellow card) 38'	Box Score	Welker 23'; Marshall (yellow card) 34'; Noone 51' (pen.); Basso (yellow card) 76'	Stadium: Restart Stadium

April 21 2	Charlotte Eagles	0–0	Harrisburg City Islanders	Wilmington, North Carolina
20:00	Evans (yellow card) 35'; Nicholson (yellow card) 62'	Box Score	Langley (yellow card) 76'	Stadium: Legion Stadium

May 4 3	Harrisburg City Islanders	1–2	Charlotte Eagles	Harrisburg, Pennsylvania
19:00	Hoppenot (yellow card) 27' (goal) 47'	Box Score	Thorton (yellow card) 20'; Blanco (yellow card) 54'; Roberts 66'; Herrera 71' (yellow card) 76'	Stadium: Skyline Sports Complex

May 12 4	Richmond Kickers	2–2	Harrisburg City Islanders	Richmond, Virginia
19:00	Delicâte 8'; Agorsor (yellow card) 11' (goal) 78'	Box Score	Noone 9'; Pelletier (yellow card) 44'; Langley (yellow card) 58'; Ekra 80'; Welker (yellow card) 89'	Stadium: City Stadium

May 16 5	Harrisburg City Islanders	0–0	Pittsburgh Riverhounds	Harrisburg, Pennsylvania
19:00		Box Score	Amoo (yellow card) 85'	Stadium: Skyline Sports Complex

May 19 6	Harrisburg City Islanders	4–0	Dayton Dutch Lions	Harrisburg, Pennsylvania
	Ekra 14', 16', 56'; Langley 42'; Mellor (yellow card) 90'	Box Score	DeGroot (yellow card) 78'; Priestley (yellow card) 90'	Stadium: Skyline Sports Complex

May 25 7	Harrisburg City Islanders	1–0	Rochester Rhinos	Harrisburg, Pennsylvania
	Langley 48'	Box Score	Rosenlund (yellow card) 39'; Fernández (yellow card) 83'	Stadium: Skyline Sports Complex

June 1 8	Harrisburg City Islanders	1–1	Richmond Kickers	Harrisburg, Pennsylvania
19:00	Brandt (yellow card) 67'; Pettis 79'; Basso (yellow card) 84'	Box Score	Johnson 68' (yellow card) 70'	Stadium: Skyline Sports Complex

June 9 9	Harrisburg City Islanders	0–2	Wilmington Hammerheads	Harrisburg, Pennsylvania
19:00	Langley (yellow card) 28'; Noone (yellow card) 45'	Box Score	Budnyi 31'; Hertzog 34'; Lassiter (yellow card) 36'	Stadium: Skyline Sports Complex

June 15 10	Harrisburg City Islanders	2–1	Rochester Rhinos	Harrisburg, Pennsylvania
19:00	Ekra 86'; Mkosana 86'	Box Score	Roberts (yellow card) 49'; Traynor (yellow card) 77'; Tanke 80'	Stadium: Skyline Sports Complex

June 22 11	Orlando City	3–0	Harrisburg City Islanders	Orlando, Florida
19:35	Luzunaris (yellow card) 42' (goal) 45+1'; Chin 48', 70'	Box Score	Marshall (yellow card) 49'; Jordan (yellow card) 88'	Stadium: Camping World Stadium

June 23 12	Charleston Battery	3–1	Harrisburg City Islanders	Charleston, South Carolina
19:30	Cuevas 45+1'; Boyd 50'; Sanyang (yellow card) 72'; Paterson (yellow card) 76'; Richter 87'	Box Score	Marshall (yellow card) 49'; Jordan (yellow card) 88'	Stadium: MUSC Health Stadium

June 30 13	Rochester Rhinos	1–2	Harrisburg City Islanders	Rochester, New York
19:05	Kirk (yellow card) 70'; Banks (yellow card) 75' (goal) 89'; Nicht (yellow card) 90'	Box Score	Mkosana 52'; Yates 83'	Stadium: Rhinos Stadium

July 6 14	Pittsburgh Riverhounds	2–3	Harrisburg City Islanders	Bridgeville, Pennsylvania
19:00	Costanzo 25' (yellow card) 90+1'; Kassel (yellow card) 27'; Katic (yellow card) 54'; Amoo 79'	Box Score	Mkosana 52'; Marshall (yellow card) 62'; Touray 81'; Pettis 87' (yellow card) 90+1'; Welker (yellow card) 90+2'	Stadium: Chartiers Valley High School Stadium

July 7 15	Harrisburg City Islanders	1–1	Antigua Barracuda FC	Harrisburg, Pennsylvania
20:30	Brandt (yellow card) 35'; Welker (yellow card) 89'; Touray 90+2'	Box Score	Byers (yellow card) 52'; Mack (yellow card) 64'; Aldred 70'; Smith (yellow card) 72'	Stadium: Skyline Sports Complex

July 13 16	Harrisburg City Islanders	0–0	Dayton Dutch Lions	Harrisburg, Pennsylvania
18:08	Noble (yellow card) 57'; Mellor (yellow card) 67'; Zizzi (yellow card) 84'	Box Score	Copier (yellow card) 41'	Stadium: Skyline Sports Complex

July 18 17	Dayton Dutch Lions	2–1	Harrisburg City Islanders	Bellbrook, Ohio
19:30	Bardsley 38'; Bartels 51'	Box Score	Mellor 9'	Stadium: Miami Valley South Stadium

July 20 18	Pittsburgh Riverhounds	0–2	Harrisburg City Islanders	Bridgeville, Pennsylvania
19:00	Kassel (yellow card) 89'	Box Score	Mellor 5'; Jordan (yellow card) 15'; Pelletier (yellow card) 76'; Mkosana 85'; Ekra (yellow card) 89'	Stadium: Chartiers Valley High School Stadium

July 28 19	Harrisburg City Islanders	2–0	Orange County Blues	Harrisburg, Pennsylvania
19:00	Brandt (yellow card) 16'; Pettis (yellow card) 48'; Langley 54'; Mkosana 67'; Marshall (yellow card) 72'	Box Score	Burke (yellow card) 18'; Borja (yellow card) 18'	Stadium: Skyline Sports Complex

August 1 20	Harrisburg City Islanders	2–4	Orlando City	Harrisburg, Pennsylvania
19:00	Pettis 10'; Ekra (yellow card) 22'; Ombiji (yellow card) 45+1'; Basso (yellow card) 49'; Allen 82' (o.g.)	Box Score	Watson 6', 31'; Davies (yellow card) 49'; Ustruck 62' (yellow card) 90+2'; Chin 75'	Stadium: Skyline Sports Complex

August 8 21	Harrisburg City Islanders	3–0	Charleston Battery	Harrisburg, Pennsylvania
19:00	Ombiji 30'; Mellor 36'; Jordan (yellow card) 39'; Marshall (yellow card) 63'; Mkosana 83'	Box Score	Hoffer (red card) 25'; Sanyang (yellow card) 43'; Richter (yellow card) 58'; Falvey (yellow card) 64'	Stadium: Skyline Sports Complex

August 11 22	Richmond Kickers	2–1	Harrisburg City Islanders	Richmond, Virginia
19:00	Nyazamba 13'; Agorsor (yellow card) 44'; Kalungi (yellow card) 56'; William 78'	Box Score	William 15' (o.g.); Welker (yellow card) 86'	Stadium: City Stadium

August 17 23	Orange County Blues	2–2	Harrisburg City Islanders	Fullerton, California
19:00	Galindo 15' (yellow card) 36'; Borja (yellow card) 35'; Jean-Baptiste (yellow card) 65'; Garcia (red card) 67'; Fondy 85'	Box Score	Duckett 26'; Mkosana 33'; Basso (yellow card) 58'; Pettis (yellow card) 86' (yellow-red card) 88'	Stadium: Titan Stadium

August 19 24	Orange County Blues	0–1	Harrisburg City Islanders	Fullerton, California
19:00	Jean-Baptiste (yellow card) 55'; Galindo (red card) 82'	Box Score	Ekra 66'; Pelletier (yellow card) 90'	Stadium: Titan Stadium

==== Results summary ====
Overall								Home						Away					
Pld	Pts	W	L	T	GF	GA	GD	W	L	T	GF	GA	GD	W	L	T	GF	GA	GD
24	37	10	7	7	34	29	+5	5	3	4	17	11	+6	5	4	3	17	18	−1

Last updated: January 22, 2017
Source: 2012 USL Pro season
Pld = Matches played; Pts = Points; W = Matches won; T = Matches tied; L = Matches lost; GF = Goals for; GA = Goals against; GD = Goal difference

Round	1	2	3	4	5	6	7	8	9	10	11	12	13	14	15	16	17	18	19	20	21	22	23	24
Stadium	A	A	H	A	H	H	H	H	H	H	A	A	A	A	H	H	A	A	H	H	H	A	A	A
Result	W	T	L	T	T	W	W	T	L	W	L	L	W	W	T	T	L	W	W	L	W	L	T	W

Source: 2012 USL Pro season and Game Results
A = Away; H = Home; W = Win; L = Loss; T = Tie

==== Playoffs ====
The City Islanders were beaten in the quarterfinals of the 2012 USL Pro season playoffs by the Charleston Battery. The South Carolina club ran out 2–1 winners and would eventually win the 2012 USL Pro Championship against Wilmington Hammerheads.

August 25 Quarter-Finals	Charleston Battery	2–1	Harrisburg City Islanders	Charleston, South Carolina
19:30	Paterson 40' (pen.); (yellow card) 90+2'; Donatelli 45+1'; Richter (yellow card) 80'	Box Score	Ombiji 15'; Mellor (yellow card) 45'; Pelletier (yellow card) 53'; Basso (yellow card) 78'	Stadium: MUSC Health Stadium

=== U.S. Open Cup ===
The Harrisburg City Islanders played one of their best runs in the 2012 U.S. Open Cup being one of three teams from the lower divisions to advanced the furthest in the tournament (to the Quarterfinals). In the process, the City Islanders record wins over two MLS clubs: New England Revolution (in the Third Round) and New York Red Bulls (in the Fourth Round).

They were ultimately knocked out of the tournament in the Quarterfinals by their MLS affiliate, Philadelphia Union.

May 22, 2012 Second round	Harrisburg City Islanders	2–0	Long Island Rough Riders	Harrisburg, Pennsylvania
19:00 EDT	Ekra 48'; Ombiji (yellow card) 40' (goal) 77'	Report	Mulligan (yellow card) 41'; Hole (yellow card) 61'	Stadium: Skyline Sports Complex

May 29, 2012 Third round	Harrisburg City Islanders	3–3 (a.e.t.) (4–3 p)	New England Revolution	Harrisburg, Pennsylvania
7:00 PM EDT	Touray (yellow card) 11', (goal) 117'; Pelletier (yellow card) 45'; Ombiji (yellow card) 89', (goal) 111'; Noone 120'	Report	White (yellow card) 17'; Fagundez (red card) 36'; Rowe 95'; Nguyen 100' (pen.); Feilhaber 103'	Stadium: Skyline Sports Complex; Attendance: 441; Referee: Ayodeji Obisesan
	Penalties
	Noone (penalty missed); Basso (penalty scored); Duckett (penalty scored); Yates (penalty scored); Marshall (penalty scored)		Nguyen (penalty scored); Rowe (penalty missed); Roach (penalty scored); Brettschneider (penalty scored); Feilhaber (penalty missed)

June 5, 2012 Fourth round	Harrisburg City Islanders	3–1 (a.e.t.)	New York Red Bulls	Harrisburg, Pennsylvania
19:05 EDT	Touray 13', 94'; Duckett (yellow card) 28'; Welker (yellow card) 38'; Pelletier (yellow card) 87'; Basso (yellow card) 90+2'; Noble (yellow card) 115'; Mkosana 117'	Report	Lade 58'; Arteaga (yellow card) 90+2'; Holgersson (yellow card) 120'	Stadium: Skyline Sports Complex; Attendance: 1,477; Referee: Robert Sibiga

June 26, 2012 Quarterfinals	Philadelphia Union	5–2	Harrisburg City Islanders	Chester, Pennsylvania
19:30 EDT	Adu 5' (pen.); McInerney 9'; Pajoy 29', 68' (pen.); Gómez 81'; McInerney (yellow card) 90+2'	Report	Ombiji 51'; Langley 54'; Marshall (yellow card) 60'; Langley (yellow card) 74'; Pelletier (yellow card) 78'	Stadium: PPL Park; Attendance: 4,313
