= 2011 USL Pro season =

25th season of third-division soccer league in the United States

USL Pro
- Season: 2011
- Champions: Orlando City SC (1st Title)
- Commissioner's Cup: Orlando City SC (1st Title)
- Matches: 108
- Goals: 273 (2.53 per match)
- Best Player: (Cuba) Yordany Álvarez Orlando City SC
- Top goalscorer: (Colombia) Jhonny Arteaga F.C. New York (13 Goals)
- Best goalkeeper: (Mexico) Miguel Gallardo Orlando City SC
- Biggest home win: HAR 4, CHE 0 (July 2); HAR 5, NEW 1 (July 20); ORL 4, HAR 0 (August 12)
- Biggest away win: ANT 7, PRU 0 (April 27)
- Highest scoring: ANT 7, PRU 0 (April 27); CHB 4, CHE 3 (August 12)
- Longest winning run: 6 games: RIC (April 2 – 7 May); ANT (April 23 – 8 May)
- Longest unbeaten run: 11 games: ORL (April 9 – June 4)
- Longest winless run: 13 games: DDL (June 8 – July 27)
- Longest losing run: 7 games: ANT (June 24 – July 16)
- Highest attendance: 11,220; ORL vs HAR (September 3) (Championship)
- Lowest attendance: 105; LAB vs PRU (April 20)
- Average attendance: 2,274

The 2011 USL Pro season was the 25th season of third-division soccer in the United States, and was the inaugural season of the United Soccer Leagues' (USL) new professional competition. The league is effectively a combination of the USL's former First and Second Divisions.

Following the conclusion of the regular season in August, a postseason tournament, known as the USL Pro Playoffs, took place between the top eight clubs during the season. The quarterfinals was played between August 19–20, the semifinals between August 26–28, and the championship took place on September 3.

== Teams ==
USL Pro was initially set to feature 15 clubs that would be aligned into three conferences of five clubs: the "American", "National" and "International" conferences. The league announced that each club would play an unbalanced schedule with a total of 24 matches. Initially, the International Division clubs were intended to play each other four times, twice home and twice away, with four games apiece at home and away against competition from the American and National Divisions. The American and National Division clubs were intended to play each other twice: home and away, regardless of division.

Original Divisional Alignment
American Division	Charleston Battery, Charlotte Eagles, Orlando City SC, Richmond Kickers, Wilmington Hammerheads
National Division	Dayton Dutch Lions, F.C. New York, Harrisburg City Islanders, Pittsburgh Riverhounds, Rochester Rhinos
International Division	Antigua Barracuda, Los Angeles Blues, Puerto Rico United, River Plate Puerto Rico, Sevilla FC Puerto Rico

However, on May 10, 2011, the USL formally removed the three Puerto Rico Soccer League teams and announced that all remaining teams would continue to play a 24-game schedule.

=== Stadiums and Locations ===
Team	Location	Stadium	Capacity
Antigua Barracuda	St. John's, Antigua	Stanford Cricket Ground	5,000
Charleston Battery	Charleston, South Carolina	Blackbaud Stadium	5,100
Charlotte Eagles	Charlotte, North Carolina	Restart Field	2,000
Dayton Dutch Lions	Bellbrook, Ohio	Miami Valley South Stadium	3,000
F.C. New York	Jamaica, New York	Belson Stadium	2,600
Harrisburg City Islanders	Harrisburg, Pennsylvania	Skyline Sports Complex	5,000
Los Angeles Blues	Fullerton, California	Titan Stadium	10,000
Orlando City SC	Orlando, Florida	Citrus Bowl	65,438
Pittsburgh Riverhounds	Bridgeville, Pennsylvania	Chartiers Valley High School	2,500
Richmond Kickers	Richmond, Virginia	City Stadium	22,000
Rochester Rhinos	Rochester, New York	Sahlen's Stadium	13,768
Wilmington Hammerheads	Wilmington, North Carolina	Legion Stadium	6,000

=== Personnel and Kits ===
Note: Flags indicate national team as has been defined under FIFA eligibility rules. Players and Managers may hold more than one non-FIFA nationality.

Team	Head coach	Captain	Jersey manufacturer	Shirt sponsor
Antigua Barracuda	(Scotland) Billy McEwan	(Antigua and Barbuda) Dave Carr	Joma	
Charleston Battery	(United States) Michael Anhaeuser	(South Africa) Stephen Armstrong	Umbro	avVenta
Charlotte Eagles	(United States) Mark Steffens	(United States) Josh Rife	Puma	Coca-Cola
Dayton Dutch Lions	(Netherlands) Ivar van Dinteren	(United States) Bret Jones	Under Armour	Scoutforall.com
F.C. New York	(England) Matt Weston	(England) Paul Shaw	Umbro	Treiber
Harrisburg City Islanders	(United States) Bill Becher		Nike	Capital Blue Cross/Snickers
Los Angeles Blues	(United States) Charlie Naimo	(Iran) Shahryar Dastan	Nike	Marriott
Orlando City SC	(England) Adrian Heath	(United States) Ian Fuller	Umbro	Orlando Health
Pittsburgh Riverhounds	(United States) Justin Evans		Umbro	#1 Cochran
Richmond Kickers	(England) Leigh Cowlishaw		Adidas	HCA Virginia
Rochester Rhinos	(United States) Bob Lilley		Umbro	Non-Smoking Coalition
Wilmington Hammerheads	(England) David Irving		Umbro	New Hanover Regional Medical Center

== Standings ==
Locations of teams for the 2011 USL Pro season

=== American Division ===
Pos	Team	Pld	W	T	L	GF	GA	GD	Pts	Qualification
1	Orlando City SC (C)	24	15	6	3	36	16	+20	51	2011 USL Pro Commissioner's Cup, 2011 USL Pro Playoffs
2	Wilmington Hammerheads (A)	24	14	3	7	42	30	+12	45	2011 USL Pro Playoffs (Note: The top four clubs in each division are guaranteed spots in the 2011 USL Pro Playoffs.)
3	Richmond Kickers (A)	24	12	5	7	35	21	+14	41	2011 USL Pro Playoffs
4	Charleston Battery (A)	24	10	5	9	24	25	−1	35	2011 USL Pro Playoffs
5	Charlotte Eagles	24	9	6	9	32	29	+3	33	
6	Antigua Barracuda	24	9	2	13	32	32	0	29	

Source: USL Pro official standings
Rules for classification: Points, then tiebreak: 1) Head-to-head record based on total points in League games, 2) Total wins in League games, 3) Goal difference in League games, 4) Goals scored in League games, etc.
(A) Advances to USL Pro Playoffs; (C) Commissioner's Cup (best regular season record)

=== National Division ===
Pos	Team	Pld	W	T	L	GF	GA	GD	Pts	Qualification
1	Rochester Rhinos (A)	24	12	4	8	31	23	+8	40	2011 USL Pro Playoffs (Note: The top four clubs in each division are guaranteed spots in the 2011 USL PRO Playoffs.)
2	Harrisburg City Islanders (A)	24	10	7	7	37	30	+7	37	2011 USL Pro Playoffs
3	Los Angeles Blues (A)	24	8	9	7	34	29	+5	33	2011 USL Pro Playoffs
4	Pittsburgh Riverhounds (A)	24	7	6	11	23	32	−9	27	2011 USL Pro Playoffs
5	F.C. New York	24	6	7	11	27	37	−10	25	
6	Dayton Dutch Lions	24	2	6	16	21	54	−33	12	

Source: USL Pro official standings
Rules for classification: Points, then tiebreak: 1) Head-to-head record based on total points in League games, 2) Total wins in League games, 3) Goal difference in League games, 4) Goals scored in League games, etc.
(A) Advances to USL Pro Playoffs

== Results table ==
Color Key: Home • Away • Win • Loss • Draw
Club	Match																							
Club	1	2	3	4	5	6	7	8	9	10	11	12	13	14	15	16	17	18	19	20	21	22	23	24
Antigua Barracuda FC (ANT)	LAB	SPR^{†}	SPR^{†}	PRU^{†}	RPP^{†}	LAB	RPP^{†}	RPP^{†}	ROC	CHE	ROC	ROC	ORL	ORL	ORL^{†}	NEW^{†}	PIT^{†}	WIL	WIL^{†}	RIC	LAB^{†}	LAB^{†}	LAB^{†}	LAB^{†}
Antigua Barracuda FC (ANT)	1–2	0–1	3–2	7–0	1–0	1–0	2–0	1–0	0–2	0–2	1–2	2–2	2–1	1–3	1–2	0–2	0–2	0–1	2–3	0–1	2–1	1–2	1–1	3–0
Charleston Battery (CHB)	CHE	DAY	RIC	CHE	PIT	PIT	ROC	NEW	WIL	RIC	HAR	NEW	HAR	DAY	WIL^{†}	PIT	LAB^{†}	ORL	WIL	DAY	ROC	ORL	ORL^{†}	CHE
Charleston Battery (CHB)	1–0	2–1	1–2	2–1	0–0	0–0	0–1	0–1	0–3	2–1	2–1	1–1	0–1	1–0	2–0	0–2	0–0	1–0	2–1	2–2	0–1	0–1	1–2	4–3
Charlotte Eagles (CHE)	CHB	ORL	NEW	CHB	LAB	LAB	ANT	DAY	ORL	WIL	DAY	PIT	HAR	NEW	RIC	RIC	HAR	WIL	WIL	ROC	ROC	PIT	HAR	CHB
Charlotte Eagles (CHE)	0–1	0–1	0–0	1–2	1–2	2–1	2–0	1–1	0–0	3–0	2–0	2–0	0–4	3–1	2–1	1–2	1–1	1–0	0–3	2–2	3–0	2–2	0–1	3–4
Dayton Dutch Lions (DAY)	CHB	ROC	RIC	ORL	LAB	CHE	PIT	HAR	NEW	CHB	CHE	ROC	RIC^{†}	ORL	HAR	LAB^{†}	LAB^{†}	PIT	CHB	HAR	NEW^{†}	RIC	NEW	WIL
Dayton Dutch Lions (DAY)	1–2	2–3	0–6	0–1	1–1	1–1	2–1	1–4	0–3	0–1	0–2	0–1	1–3	0–0	2–2	1–1	1–4	1–3	2–2	2–3	2–0	0–3	0–5	1–2
FC New York (NEW)	ORL	CHE	ORL	HAR	CHB	WIL	PIT	RIC	ROC	CHE	DAY	RIC	HAR^{†}	RIC^{†}	ANT^{†}	CHE	ROC	PIT	PIT	WIL	DAY^{†}	HAR	ROC^{†}	DAY
FC New York (NEW)	0–3	0–0	1–2	1–1	1–0	1–3	0–2	2–2	2–1	1–1	3–0	0–2	1–5	0–0	2–0	1–3	1–3	1–2	1–1	1–3	1–2	0–0	2–1	5–0
Harrisburg City Islanders (HAR)	PIT	NEW	ROC	RIC	ORL	CHB	PIT^{†}	CHB	DAY	ROC	RIC	LAB	LAB	CHE	DAY	CHE	WIL	NEW^{†}	LAB	DAY	WIL	NEW	CHE	ORL
Harrisburg City Islanders (HAR)	0–1	1–1	1–0	1–1	1–3	1–2	4–2	1–0	4–1	0–1	1–0	1–1	2–1	4–0	2–2	1–1	1–3	5–1	1–1	3–2	2–1	0–0	1–0	0–4
Los Angeles Blues (LAB)	SPR^{†}	ANT	PRU^{†}	RPP^{†}	ANT	CHE	CHE	DAY	PIT	HAR^{†}	HAR^{†}	CHB^{†}	WIL^{†}	DAY^{†}	DAY^{†}	RIC^{†}	HAR^{†}	ANT^{†}	ANT^{†}	ANT^{†}	WIL^{†}	ANT^{†}	RIC^{†}	RIC^{†}
Los Angeles Blues (LAB)	3–0	2–1	4–2	1–1	0–1	2–1	1–2	1–1	3–0	1–1	1–2	0–0	2–4	1–1	4–1	2–1	1–1	1–2	2–1	1–1	1–2	0–3	0–0	0–0
Orlando City SC (ORL)	RIC	NEW	CHE	PRU^{†}	NEW	DAY	PIT	ROC	HAR	RIC	CHE	WIL	ANT	WIL	ANT^{†}	ANT	PIT	ROC	DAY	CHB	ROC	CHB	CHB ^{†}	HAR
Orlando City SC (ORL)	0–2	3–0	1–0	2–2	2–1	1–0	1–0	0–0	3–1	2–0	0–0	4–2	1–2	1–1	3–1	2–1	0–0	1–0	0–0	0–1	2–1	1–0	2–1	4–0
Pittsburgh Riverhounds (PIT)	RIC	HAR	WIL	CHB	CHB	ORL	NEW	LAB	WIL	HAR^{†}	DAY	WIL	ROC	CHE	CHB	ORL	ANT ^{†}	NEW	NEW	DAY	ROC	RIC	CHE	ROC
Pittsburgh Riverhounds (PIT)	1–2	1–0	1–3	0–0	0–0	0–1	2–0	0–3	0–0	2–4	1–2	1–3	0–3	0–2	2–0	0–0	2–0	2–1	1–1	3–1	0–3	2–0	2–2	0–1
Richmond Kickers (RIC)	ORL	PIT	ROC	CHB	DAY	WIL	HAR	CHB	ORL	NEW	NEW	HAR	NEW	ROC	DAY ^{†}	CHE	CHE^{†}	ANT^{†}	LAB	PIT^{†}	DAY	WIL	LAB^{†}	LAB^{†}
Richmond Kickers (RIC)	2–0	2–1	1–0	2–1	6–0	2–1	1–1	1–2	0–2	2–2	2–0	0–1	0–0	1–2	3–1	1–2	2–1	1–0	1–2	0–2	3–0	2–0	0–0	0–0
Rochester Rhinos (ROC)	RIC	WIL	DAY	HAR	CHB	ANT	ORL	WIL	NEW	ANT	ANT	HAR	PIT	DAY	RIC	ORL	NEW	ORL	PIT	CHE	CHB	CHE	NEW^{†}	PIT
Rochester Rhinos (ROC)	0–1	0–1	3–2	0–1	1–0	2–0	0–0	1–1	1–2	2–1	2–2	1–0	3–0	1–0	2–1	0–1	3–1	1–2	3–0	2–2	1–0	0–3	1–2	0–1
Wilmington Hammerheads (WIL)	ROC	PIT	RIC	NEW	CHB	ROC	PIT	ORL	PIT	CHE	ORL	CHB^{†}	LAB^{†}	ANT^{†}	ANT	CHB	HAR	CHE	CHE	NEW	HAR	LAB^{†}	RIC	DAY
Wilmington Hammerheads (WIL)	1–0	3–1	1–2	3–1	3–0	1–1	0–0	2–4	3–1	0–3	1–1	0–2	4–2	1–0	3–2	1–2	3–1	0–1	3–0	3–1	2–1	2–1	0–2	2–1
Puerto Rican Teams: Puerto Rico United – PRU^{†} • River Plate Puerto Rico – RPP^{†} • Sevilla FC Puerto Rico – SPR^{†}

† Puerto Rican teams were removed from USL Pro League on 10 May. All results against them that took place to that date were kept and future games were rescheduled amongst the remaining teams.

=== Average home attendances ===
Ranked from highest to lowest average attendance.

Team	GP	Total	High	Low	Average
Orlando City SC	12	63,185	7,933	1,321	5,265
Rochester Rhinos	12	61,651	7,459	3,027	5,138
Wilmington Hammerheads	12	47,117	5,783	1,924	3,926
Charleston Battery	12	42,819	4,771	2,461	3,568
Richmond Kickers	12	23,827	4,742	743	1,986
Antigua Barracuda	12	18,911	6,000	500	1,576
Harrisburg City Islanders	12	16,845	2,038	838	1,404
Pittsburgh Riverhounds SC	12	13,555	2,035	624	1,130
Charlotte Eagles	12	12,339	1,352	854	1,028
FC New York	12	9,963	2,011	338	972
Dayton Dutch Lions	12	7,929	2,000	262	661
Los Angeles Blues	12	4,456	704	105	371
Total	144	322,597	7,933	105	2,240

== Playoffs ==
The top four teams in each division at the end of the regular season qualified for a single-elimination playoff for the USL Pro Championship. The championship match was played at 7:00 pm on Saturday, September 3, and saw Orlando City SC defeat the Harrisburg City Islanders in a penalty shootout. Orlando City SC earned the right to host the championship match by virtue of their better regular-season record.

Divisional Semifinals
A1	Orlando City SC (a.e.t.)	3
A4	Charleston Battery	1
American Division
A2	Wilmington Hammerheads	0 (4)
A3	Richmond Kickers (p)	0 (5)
N1	Rochester Rhinos	4
N4	Pittsburgh Riverhounds	0
National Division
N2	Harrisburg City Islanders	3
N3	Los Angeles Blues	2

Divisional Finals
A1	Orlando City SC	3
A3	Richmond Kickers	0
N1	Rochester Rhinos	1
N2	Harrisburg City Islanders	2

USL PRO Championship
A1	Orlando City SC (p)	2 (3)
N2	Harrisburg City Islanders	2 (2)

August 19, 2011 QF	Harrisburg City Islanders	3–2	Los Angeles Blues	Harrisburg, Pennsylvania
7:30 pm EDT	Bloes (yellow card) 5'; Welker 34', 39'; Ombiji 52'; Pelletier (yellow card) 62' (yellow-red card) 66'	Report	Tudela 11' (yellow card) 61'; Dastan (yellow card) 33'; García 45+' (yellow card) 72'; Rivera (yellow card) 58'; Sesay (yellow card) 61'	Stadium: Skyline Sports Complex; Attendance: 1,033; Referee: Michael Donovan

August 19, 2011 QF	Rochester Rhinos	4–0	Pittsburgh Riverhounds	Rochester, New York
7:30 pm EDT	Rosenlund 10'; Donatelli 28'; Kissi 47'; Cost 85'	Report		Stadium: Sahlen's Stadium; Attendance: 3,273; Referee: Robert Sigiba

August 19, 2011 QF	Wilmington Hammerheads	0–0 (a.e.t.) (4–5 p)	Richmond Kickers	Wilmington, North Carolina
7:30 pm EDT	Nicholson (yellow card) 49'; Parratt (yellow card) 99'	Report	Heins (yellow card) 47'; Görres (yellow card) 100'	Stadium: Legion Field; Attendance: 3,849; Referee: Moo Hackett
	Penalties
	Budnyi (penalty scored); Jata (penalty scored); Barrera (penalty scored); Cuero (penalty scored); Bagley (penalty missed)		(penalty scored) Görres; (penalty scored) Bulow; (penalty scored) Hiroyama; (penalty scored) Delicâte; (penalty scored) Bangura

August 20, 2011 QF	Orlando City SC	3–1 (a.e.t.)	Charleston Battery	Orlando, Florida
7:30 pm EDT	Griffin 44'; Chin 100'; Neal 118'	Report	Wiltse (yellow card) 34'; Kelly (yellow card) 59' (yellow-red card) 102'; Paterson 64'; Falvey (yellow card) 102'; Peverley (yellow card) 120'	Stadium: Citrus Bowl; Attendance: 7,609; Referee: Rob Mauws

August 26, 2011 SF	Rochester Rhinos	1–2	Harrisburg City Islanders	Rochester, New York
7:30 pm EDT	Donatelli (red card) 27'; Kissi 45'; Kirk (yellow card) 51'	Report	Basso 6'; Marshall (red card) 27'; Calvano (yellow card) 34'; Schofield 38' (yellow card) 80'; Ombiji (red card) 42'	Stadium: Sahlen's Stadium; Attendance: 3,598; Referee: Jose Carlos Rivero

August 27, 2011 SF	Orlando City SC	3–0	Richmond Kickers	Orlando, Florida
7:30 pm EDT	Boden 19'; Jérôme 45+2'; Chin 70'	Report	Wallace (yellow card) 3'; Kalungi (red card) 89'	Stadium: Citrus Bowl; Attendance: 8,304; Referee: Andres Pfefferkorn

September 3, 2011 F	Orlando City SC	2–2 (a.e.t.) (3–2 p)	Harrisburg City Islanders	Orlando, Florida
7:00 pm EDT	Gallardo (red card) 48'; Molino (yellow card) 64'; Olum 89'; Boden (yellow card) 110'; Neal 116' (pen.)	Report	Basso (yellow card) 5'; Pelletier (yellow card) 45+'; Welker (yellow card) 77'; Harrison (yellow card) 90+'; Noone 90+5'; Touray 95'; Langley (yellow card) 111'; Bloes (red card) 113'	Stadium: Citrus Bowl; Attendance: 11,220; Referee: Matt Foerster
	Penalties
	Neal (penalty scored); Álvarez (penalty scored); Campbell (penalty missed); Boden (penalty missed); Jorsling (penalty scored)		(penalty missed) Becerra; (penalty missed) Angulo; (penalty scored) Noone; (penalty scored) Basso; (penalty missed) Touray

Championship Game MVP: (United States) Sean Kelley (ORL)

== Statistical leaders ==
=== Top scorers ===
Rank	Player	Nation	Club	Goals
1	Jhonny Arteaga	COL	F.C. New York	13
2	Matthew Delicâte	ENG	Richmond Kickers	10
3	José Angulo	COL	Harrisburg City Islanders	9
3	Maxwell Griffin	USA	Orlando City SC	9
3	Luke Mulholland	ENG	Wilmington Hammerheads	9
6	Andriy Budnyi	UKR	Wilmington Hammerheads	8
6	Jamie Watson	USA	Orlando City SC	8
6	Andrew Welker	USA	Harrisburg City Islanders	8
9	Chris Banks	USA	Wilmington Hammerheads	7
9	Sallieu Bundu	SLE	Charlotte Eagles	7
9	George Davis IV	USA	Dayton Dutch Lions	7
9	Sainey Touray	GAM	Harrisburg City Islanders	7

=== Top assists ===
Rank	Player	Nation	Club	Assists
1	Tadeu Terra	BRA	F.C. New York	8
2	Jorge Herrera	COL	Charlotte Eagles	7
3	Andriy Budnyi	UKR	Wilmington Hammerheads	6
3	Sainey Touray	GAM	Harrisburg City Islanders	6
5	Luke Mulholland	ENG	Wilmington Hammerheads	5
6	Nicki Paterson	SCO	Charleston Battery	4
6	Jimmy Banks	USA	Rochester Rhinos	4
6	Sascha Görres	GER	Richmond Kickers	4
6	Thomas Gray	USA	Pittsburgh Riverhounds	4
6	Stanley Nyazamba	ZIM	Richmond Kickers	4
6	Tony Donatelli	USA	Rochester Rhinos	4
6	J.T. Noone	USA	Harrisburg City Islanders	4
6	Tom Parratt	SCO	Wilmington Hammerheads	4
6	Akeem Priestley	JAM	Los Angeles Blues	4
6	Brian Ombiji	KEN	Harrisburg City Islanders	4
6	Quinton Griffith	ATG	Antigua Barracuda	4
6	Cesar Rivera	USA	Los Angeles Blues	4

=== Top Goalkeepers ===
(Minimum of 1080 Minutes Played)

Rank	Goalkeeper	Club	GP	MINS	SVS	GA	GAA	W-L-T	SHO
1	(Mexico) Miguel Gallardo	Orlando City SC	22	1980	68	15	0.681	12-3-6	11
2	(United States) Andrew Dykstra	Charleston Battery	13	1170	30	11	0.846	7-4-2	5
3	(United States) Ronnie Pascale	Richmond Kickers	23	2070	64	21	0.913	12-7-4	9
4	(United States) Neal Kitson	Rochester Rhinos	23	2070	76	22	0.956	12-7-4	9
5	(United States) Brock Duckworth	Wilmington Hammerheads	18	1620	71	46	1.166	11-5-2	4
6	(Mexico) Óscar Dautt	Los Angeles Blues	20	1800	77	53	1.200	6-6-8	5
7	(United States) Eric Reed	Charlotte Eagles	24	2160	81	29	1.208	9-9-6	8
8	(Antigua and Barbuda) Keita de Castro	Antigua Barracuda	19	1710	58	23	1.210	8-8-1	5
9	(United States) Chase Harrison	Harrisburg City Islanders	20	1800	59	26	1.300	8-6-6	5
10	(United States) Hunter Gilstrap	Pittsburgh Riverhounds	23	2070	98	30	1.304	7-11-5	9

== League awards ==
- Most Valuable Player: (Cuba) Yordany Álvarez (ORL)
- Rookie of the Year: (England) Luke Mulholland (WIL)
- Defender of the Year: (United States) Rob Valentino (ORL)
- Goalkeeper of the Year: (Mexico) Miguel Gallardo (ORL)
- Coach of the Year: (England) Adrian Heath (ORL)

== All-League Teams ==
=== First Team ===
F: (Colombia) Jhonny Arteaga (NEW), (England) Matthew Delicâte (CHB), (United States) Maxwell Griffin (ORL)
M: (Cuba) Yordany Álvarez (ORL), (Colombia) Jorge Herrera (CHE), (England) Luke Mulholland (WIL)
D: (United States) Nelson Akwari (LAB), (Wales) Gareth Evans (WIL), (United States) Rob Valentino (ORL), (Cameroon) William Yomby (RIC)
G: (Mexico) Miguel Gallardo (ORL)

=== Second Team ===
F: (Colombia) José Angulo (HAR), (United States) George Davis IV (DAY), (United States) Jason Yeisley (PIT)
M: (England) Lewis Neal (ORL), (Antigua and Barbuda) Lawson Robinson (ANT), (United States) Jamie Watson (ORL)
D: (Antigua and Barbuda) George Dublin (ANT), (Republic of Ireland) Colin Falvey (CHB), (United States) Kyle Hoffer (NEW), (United States) Troy Roberts (ROC)
G: (United States) Neal Kitson (ROC)
