= 2012 U.S. Open Cup =

2012 Lamar Hunt U.S. Open Cup
Tournament details
- Country: United States
- Teams: 64

Final positions
- Champions: Sporting Kansas City (2nd title)
- Runners-up: Seattle Sounders FC
- 2013–14 CONCACAF Champions League: Sporting Kansas City

Tournament statistics
- Top goal scorer(s): Brian Shriver (5)

The 2012 Lamar Hunt U.S. Open Cup was the 99th edition of the U.S. Open Cup, the annual national soccer championship of the United States. It ran from May to August and was organized by the United States Soccer Federation. Seattle Sounders FC of Major League Soccer entered the competition as the three-time defending champions and appeared in their fourth consecutive U.S. Open Cup Final, losing to Sporting Kansas City on August 8, 2012.

For the 2012 tournament, U.S. Soccer increased the main tournament from a 40-club tournament, to a 64-club tournament. All Major League Soccer clubs based in the U.S. received automatic berths. This made the U.S. Open Cup very similar to other domestic knock-out competitions where all top-tier clubs earn automatic berths.

The farthest advancing NASL teams were the Minnesota Stars FC, Carolina RailHawks, and San Antonio Scorpions (all beat 1 MLS team), while the farthest advancing USL Pro teams were the Charlotte Eagles, Dayton Dutch Lions, and the Harrisburg City Islanders, who beat 2 MLS sides. All three USL Pro teams advanced a round past their division two NASL counterparts. The farthest advancing USL PDL team was the Michigan Bucks, who advanced to the 4th round after beating an MLS club. An amateur club, Cal FC of the USASA, won 1–0 away to MLS's Portland Timbers in a third round upset.

The winner, Sporting Kansas City, received a cash prize of $100,000 and also qualified for the 2013–14 CONCACAF Champions League (placed in Pot B).

== Qualification ==
For the first time, all 32 professional teams from the first 3 tiers of American Soccer will be participating. Additionally, 32 teams will also qualify from the USL Premier Development League, National Premier Soccer League, United States Adult Soccer Association, and US Club Soccer.

Enter in first round		Enter in second round	Enter in third round
NPSL/USASA/USCS; 6 teams/9 teams/1 team	USL PDL; 16 teams	NASL/USL Pro; All teams (6)/(10)	MLS; All teams (16)
National Premier Soccer League: Brooklyn Italians; Fullerton Rangers; Georgia Revolution; Jacksonville United†; Milwaukee Bavarians; FC Sonic Lehigh Valley; United States Adult Soccer Association: Aegean Hawks; ASC New Stars; Cal FC; Croatian Eagles; Greek American Atlas; Jersey Shore Boca; KC Athletics; NTX Rayados; PSA Elite; United States Club Soccer: Stanislaus United Turlock Express*	Carolina Dynamo; Chicago Fire Premier; Des Moines Menace; El Paso Patriots; Fresno Fuego‡; Kitsap Pumas†; Laredo Heat; Long Island Rough Riders; Michigan Bucks; Mississippi Brilla; Orlando City U-23; Portland Phoenix; Portland Timbers U23's; Reading United; Real Colorado Foxes; Ventura County Fusion	NASL: Atlanta Silverbacks; Carolina RailHawks‡; Fort Lauderdale Strikers; Minnesota Stars†; San Antonio Scorpions; Tampa Bay Rowdies; USL-Pro: Charleston Battery; Charlotte Eagles; Dayton Dutch Lions; Harrisburg City Islanders$; Los Angeles Blues; Orlando City†‡; Pittsburgh Riverhounds; Richmond Kickers; Rochester Rhinos; Wilmington Hammerheads	Chicago Fire; Chivas USA; Colorado Rapids; Columbus Crew; FC Dallas; D.C. United; Houston Dynamo; Los Angeles Galaxy†‡; New England Revolution; New York Red Bulls; Philadelphia Union; Portland Timbers; Real Salt Lake; San Jose Earthquakes; Seattle Sounders FC; Sporting Kansas City

† League Champions in 2011
‡ League Premiers in 2011
* Stanislaus United Turlock Express defeated the Bay Area Ambassadors of the NPSL in a play-in game on April 28 to qualify for the first round.

== Brackets ==
Home team is listed first, winners are in bold.

First round (May 15)
**PDL**	**Michigan Bucks**	**6**
USASA	Jersey Shore Boca	0
NPSL	FC Sonic Lehigh Valley	0
**PDL**	**Long Island Rough Riders**	**2**
PDL	Kitsap Pumas	1
**USASA**	**Cal FC**	**3**
PDL	Portland Timbers U23's	1
**USASA**	**PSA Elite**	**3**
USCS	Stanislaus United Turlock Express	0
**PDL**	**Fresno Fuego**	**2**
PDL	Real Colorado Foxes	1
**USASA**	**KC Athletics**	**3**
**PDL**	**Reading United**	**2**
USASA	Greek American Atlas	1
PDL	Portland Phoenix	2
**NPSL**	**Brooklyn Italians**	**3**
PDL	Orlando City U-23	1
**NPSL**	**Jacksonville United**	**2**
**USASA**	**Aegean Hawks**	**3**
PDL	Carolina Dynamo	1
**NPSL**	**Georgia Revolution** (aet)	**1**
PDL	Mississippi Brilla	0
**PDL**	**Laredo Heat**	**4**
USASA	ASC New Stars	2
**PDL**	**Chicago Fire Premier**	**1**
USASA	Croatian Eagles	0
NPSL	Milwaukee Bavarians	1
**PDL**	**Des Moines Menace** (aet)	**3**
**PDL**	**El Paso Patriots**	**3**
USASA	NTX Rayados	1
NPSL	Fullerton Rangers	2
**PDL**	**Ventura County Fusion** (aet)	**6**

Second round (May 22)
USLP	Pittsburgh Riverhounds	0
**PDL**	**Michigan Bucks**	**1**
**USLP**	**Harrisburg City Islanders**	**2**
PDL	Long Island Rough Riders	0
USLP	Wilmington Hammerheads	0
**USASA**	**Cal FC**	**4**
**NASL**	**Carolina RailHawks**	**6**
USASA	PSA Elite	0
**NASL**	**Fort Lauderdale Strikers**	**7**
PDL	Fresno Fuego	2
**USLP**	**Orlando City**	**7**
USASA	KC Athletics	0
**USLP**	**Charleston Battery**	**2**
PDL	Reading United	1
**USLP**	**Rochester Rhinos**	**3**
NPSL	Brooklyn Italians	0
NPSL	Jacksonville United	0
**NASL**	**Tampa Bay Rowdies**	**3**
USASA	Aegean Hawks	0
**USLP**	**Richmond Kickers**	**4**
NPSL	Georgia Revolution	0
**NASL**	**Atlanta Silverbacks**	**1**
**NASL**	**San Antonio Scorpions**	**2**
PDL	Laredo Heat	0
PDL	Chicago Fire Premier	1
**USLP**	**Dayton Dutch Lions**	**2**
PDL	Des Moines Menace	0
**NASL**	**Minnesota Stars**	**2**
PDL	El Paso Patriots	0
**USLP**	**Charlotte Eagles**	**1**
USLP	Los Angeles Blues	1
**PDL**	**Ventura County Fusion** (aet)	**3**

Third round (May 29 and 30)
**PDL**	**Michigan Bucks** (aet)	**3**
MLS	Chicago Fire	2
**USLP**	**Harrisburg City Islanders** (aet)	**3** (4)
MLS	New England Revolution	3 (3)
MLS	Portland Timbers	0
**USASA**	**Cal FC (aet)**	**1**
**NASL**	**Carolina RailHawks**	**2**
MLS	Los Angeles Galaxy	1
**MLS**	**San Jose Earthquakes**	**2**
NASL	Fort Lauderdale Strikers	1
**MLS**	**Sporting Kansas City**	**3**
USLP	Orlando City	2
USLP	Charleston Battery	0
**MLS**	**New York Red Bulls**	**3**
**MLS**	**Philadelphia Union**	**3**
USLP	Rochester Rhinos	0
NASL	Tampa Bay Rowdies	1
**MLS**	**Colorado Rapids**	**3**
USLP	Richmond Kickers	1
**MLS**	**D.C. United** (aet)	**2**
**MLS**	**Seattle Sounders FC**	**5**
NASL	Atlanta Silverbacks	1
**NASL**	**San Antonio Scorpions**	**1**
MLS	Houston Dynamo	0
MLS	Columbus Crew	1
**USLP**	**Dayton Dutch Lions**	**2**
MLS	Real Salt Lake	1
**NASL**	**Minnesota Stars**	**3**
MLS	FC Dallas	0
**USLP**	**Charlotte Eagles**	**2**
PDL	Ventura County Fusion	0
**MLS**	**Chivas USA**	**1**

Fourth round (June 5)
MLS	D.C. United	1
**MLS**	**Philadelphia Union** (aet)	**2**
**USLP**	**Harrisburg City Islanders** (aet)	**3**
MLS	New York Red Bulls	1
**MLS**	**Sporting Kansas City**	**2**
MLS	Colorado Rapids	0
PDL	Michigan Bucks	1
**USLP**	**Dayton Dutch Lions** (aet)	**2**
**MLS**	**San Jose Earthquakes**	**1**
NASL	Minnesota Stars FC	0
**MLS**	**Seattle Sounders FC**	**5**
USASA	Cal FC	0
NASL	Carolina RailHawks	1
**MLS**	**Chivas USA**	**2**
NASL	San Antonio Scorpions	1
**USLP**	**Charlotte Eagles** (aet)	**2**

Quarterfinals (June 26)
**MLS**	**Philadelphia Union**	**5**
USLP	Harrisburg City Islanders	2
**MLS**	**Sporting Kansas City**	**3**
USLP	Dayton Dutch Lions	0
MLS	San Jose Earthquakes	0
**MLS**	**Seattle Sounders FC**	**1**
**MLS**	**Chivas USA**	**2**
USLP	Charlotte Eagles	1

Semifinals (July 11)
MLS	Philadelphia Union	0
**MLS**	**Sporting Kansas City**	**2**
**MLS**	**Seattle Sounders FC**	**4**
MLS	Chivas USA	1

Final (August 8)
**MLS**	**Sporting Kansas City (aet)**	**1(3)**
MLS	Seattle Sounders FC	1(2)

== Schedule ==
Note: Scorelines use the standard U.S. convention of placing the home team on the right-hand side of box scores.

=== First round ===
32 Teams from USL PDL, NPSL, and USASA begin competition.

May 15, 2012	Croatian Eagles (USASA)	0–1	Chicago Fire Premier (PDL)	Bridgeview, IL
6:00 PM CDT		Report	Kannah 5'	Stadium: Toyota Park Practice Field; Referee: Victor Herrera

May 15, 2012	Jacksonville United (NPSL)	2–1	Orlando City U-23 (PDL)	Sanford, FL
7:00 PM EDT	Krizanovic 82' (pen.); Safi 89'	Report	Helm 50'	Stadium: Seminole Soccer Complex; Referee: Cedric Adams

May 15, 2012	Greek American Atlas (USASA)	1–2	Reading United (PDL)	Fleetwood, PA
7:00 PM EDT	Roche 64'	Report	Ribeiro 37'; Finley 55'	Stadium: Fleetwood Area High School; Referee: John McCloskey

May 15, 2012	Long Island Rough Riders (PDL)	2–0	FC Sonic Lehigh Valley (NPSL)	Whitehall, PA
7:05 PM EDT	Wharf 19'; Higgins 22'	Report		Stadium: Whitehall High School; Referee: Michael Donovan

May 15, 2012	Carolina Dynamo (PDL)	1–3	Aegean Hawks (USASA)	Germantown, MD
7:30 PM EDT	McCready 85'	Report	Larrabee 21', 46'; Ney 86'	Stadium: Maryland SoccerPlex; Referee: Shawn Fitch

May 15, 2012	Mississippi Brilla (PDL)	0–1 (a.e.t.)	Georgia Revolution (NPSL)	Conyers, GA
7:30 PM EDT		Report	Habtom 105'	Stadium: RYSA Soccerplex; Referee: Patrick Baker

May 15, 2012	Jersey Shore Boca (USASA)	0–6	Michigan Bucks (PDL)	Pontiac, MI
7:30 PM EDT		Report	St. Louis 31', 38'; Crnkic 36'; Catalano 74'; Miller 83'; Ogunyemi 89'	Stadium: Ultimate Soccer Arenas; Referee: Marc Lawrence

May 15, 2012	Brooklyn Italians (NPSL)	3–2	Portland Phoenix (PDL)	Portland, ME
8:00 PM EDT	Simons 5'; Turizo 7'; Harewood 78'	Report	Woodruff 80', 90+1'	Stadium: Memorial Stadium; Referee: Niko Bratsis

May 15, 2012	Des Moines Menace (PDL)	3–1 (a.e.t.)	Milwaukee Bavarians (NPSL)	Milwaukee, WI
8:00 PM CDT	Jupic 70'; Moloto 102', 108'	Report	Simmons 25'	Stadium: Bavarian Soccer Park; Referee: Margaret Domka

May 15, 2012	ASC New Stars (USASA)	2–4	Laredo Heat (PDL)	Laredo, TX
8:15 PM CDT	Serrato 11' (pen.); Kozlowski	Report	Simon; Villanueva 47'; Buduri 105', 119'	Stadium: Texas A&M International University Soccer Complex; Referee: Armando Villarreal

May 15, 2012	KC Athletics (USASA)	3–1	Real Colorado Foxes (PDL)	Golden, CO
7:00 PM MDT		Report		Stadium: CSM Soccer Stadium; Referee: Younes Marrakchi

May 15, 2012	NTX Rayados (USASA)	1–3	El Paso Patriots (PDL)	El Paso, TX
8:00 PM MDT	Rodriguez 78'	Report	Aizawa 26', 84'; Griego 61'	Stadium: Patriot Stadium; Referee: Jair Marrufo

May 15, 2012	Fresno Fuego (PDL)	2–0	Stanislaus United Turlock Express (USCS)	Turlock, CA
7:00 PM PDT	Campos 43', 70'	Report		Stadium: Academica Fields; Referee: Yader Reyes

May 15, 2012	Cal FC (USASA)	3–1	Kitsap Pumas (PDL)	Bremerton, WA
7:15 PM PDT	Da. Barrera 44', 66'; Aghasyan 86'	Report	Friesen 72'	Stadium: Bremerton Memorial Stadium; Referee: Josh Wilkens

May 15, 2012	PSA Elite (USASA)	3–1	Portland Timbers U23's (PDL)	Portland, OR
7:30 PM PDT	Paul 24', 89'; Ramirez 39'	Report	Miller 56'	Stadium: Jeld-Wen Field; Attendance: 1,524; Referee: Ronald Lagraff

May 15, 2012	Ventura County Fusion (PDL)	6–2 (a.e.t.)	Fullerton Rangers (NPSL)	Santa Ana, CA
TBD PDT	Roman; F. López; Chongo; Rupert; R. López	Report	Arvizu; Roldan	Stadium: Santa Ana Stadium; Referee: Daniel Radford

=== Second round ===
16 teams from NASL and USL Pro enter.

May 22, 2012	Tampa Bay Rowdies (NASL)	3–0	Jacksonville United (NPSL)	Jacksonville, FL
7:00 PM EDT	Ambersley 2'; Antoniuk 19'; Keith Savage 65'	Report		Stadium: Patton Park; Attendance: 925; Referee: Patrick O'Brian

May 22, 2012	Dayton Dutch Lions (USL Pro)	2–1	Chicago Fire Premier (PDL)	Bridgeview, IL
6:00 PM CDT	Garner 38'; Halowaty 90+2'	Report	90' King	Stadium: Toyota Park Practice Field; Referee: Miguel Panduro, Jr.

May 22, 2012	Long Island Rough Riders (PDL)	0–2	Harrisburg City Islanders (USL Pro)	Harrisburg, PA
7:00 PM EDT		Report	48' Ekra; 77' Ombiji	Stadium: Skyline Sports Complex; Referee: Ian Bongaardt

May 22, 2012	Michigan Bucks (PDL)	1–0	Pittsburgh Riverhounds (USL Pro)	Pittsburgh, PA
7:00 PM EDT	Givins 90' (pen.)	Report		Stadium: Highmark Stadium; Referee: Sorin Stoica

May 22, 2012	Cal FC (USASA)	4–0	Wilmington Hammerheads (USL Pro)	Wilmington, NC
7:00 PM EDT	Da. Barrera 25' 57'; Aghasyan 35'; Pe. Ferreira-Mendes 79'	Report		Stadium: Legion Stadium; Referee: Matthew Jozaitis

May 22, 2012	PSA Elite (USASA)	0–6	Carolina RailHawks (NASL)	Cary, NC
7:07 PM EDT		Report	7' 23' 40' 90' Shriver; 9' Lowery; 41' Schilawski	Stadium: WakeMed Soccer Park; Referee: Daniel Fitzgerald

May 22, 2012	Fresno Fuego (PDL)	2–7	Fort Lauderdale Strikers (NASL)	Fort Lauderdale, FL
7:30 PM EDT	Finch 54'; Reinhart 86'	Report	42' 57' 69' Hassan; 61' Anderson; 78' Restrepo; 89' 90' Moráles	Stadium: Lockhart Stadium; Referee: Christina Unkel

May 22, 2012	KC Athletics (USASA)	0–7	Orlando City (USL Pro)	Sanford, FL
7:30 PM EDT		Report	4' (o.g.) Andrews; 26' 42' Griffin; 28' 71' Rooney; 60' Watson; 86' Luzunaris	Stadium: Seminole Soccer Complex; Attendance: 946; Referee: Ted Unkel

May 22, 2012	Reading United (PDL)	1–2	Charleston Battery (USL Pro)	Charleston, SC
7:30 PM EDT	Ibikunle 64'	Report	69' Kelly; 79' Paterson	Stadium: Blackbaud Stadium; Referee: Skye Arthur-Banning

May 22, 2012	Brooklyn Italians (NPSL)	0–3	Rochester Rhinos (USL Pro)	Rochester, NY
7:35 PM EDT		Report	25' McManus; 43' Chinn; 76' Banks	Stadium: Sahlen's Stadium; Attendance: 3,631; Referee: Steve Montanino

May 22, 2012	Richmond Kickers (USL Pro)	4–0	Aegean Hawks (USASA)	Germantown, MD
7:30 PM EDT	Agorsor 20' 82' dos Santos 30'; Hiroyama 84'	Report		Stadium: Maryland Soccerplex; Attendance: 150; Referee: Charles Carson

May 22, 2012	Atlanta Silverbacks (NASL)	1–0	Georgia Revolution (NPSL)	Conyers, GA
7:30 PM EDT	Cox	Report		Stadium: RYSA Soccerplex; Referee: Mark Cleland

May 22, 2012	Minnesota Stars (NASL)	2–0	Des Moines Menace (PDL)	West Des Moines, IA
7:00 PM/7:30 PM CDT	Bracalello 19'; Ibarra 84'	Report		Stadium: Valley Stadium; Referee: Landis Wiley

May 22, 2012	Laredo Heat (PDL)	0–2	San Antonio Scorpions (NASL)	San Antonio, TX
7:30 PM CDT		Report	67' Campos; 74' Harmse	Stadium: Blossom Athletic Center; Attendance: Luis Guardia

May 22, 2012	Charlotte Eagles (USL Pro)	1–0	El Paso Patriots (PDL)	El Paso, TX
8:00 PM MDT	72' (o.g.)	Report		Stadium: Patriot Stadium; Referee: Mark DeClouet

May 22, 2012	Ventura County Fusion (PDL)	3–1 (a.e.t.)	Los Angeles Blues (USL Pro)	Fullerton, CA
5:00 PDT	López 35' (pen.) 107'; Bowen 116'	Report	14' (o.g.) Pontuis	Stadium: Hal Sherbeck Field House; Referee: Ramon Hernandez

=== Third round ===
16 teams from MLS enter.

May 29, 2012	New England Revolution (MLS)	3–3 (a.e.t.) (3–4 p)	Harrisburg City Islanders (USL Pro)	Harrisburg, PA
7:00 PM EDT	White (yellow card) 17'; Fagundez (red card) 36'; Rowe 95'; Nguyen 100' (pen.); Feilhaber 103'	Report	Touray (yellow card) 11', (goal) 117'; Pelletier (yellow card) 45'; Ombiji (yellow card) 89', (goal) 111'; Noone 120'	Stadium: Skyline Sports Complex; Attendance: 441; Referee: Ayodeji Obisesan (New York)
	Penalties
	Nguyen (penalty scored); Rowe (penalty missed); Roach (penalty scored); Brettschneider (penalty scored); Feilhaber (penalty missed)		(penalty missed) Noone; (penalty scored) Basso; (penalty scored) Duckett; (penalty scored) Yates; (penalty scored) Marshall

May 29, 2012	D.C. United (MLS)	2–1 (a.e.t.)	Richmond Kickers (USL Pro)	Richmond, VA
7:00 PM EDT	Salihi 24'; Saragosa 107'; Kitchen (yellow card) 111'	Report	Nyazamba 45' (pen.)	Stadium: City Stadium; Attendance: 5,014; Referee: Kai Goodrich (Virginia)

May 29, 2012	Los Angeles Galaxy (MLS)	1–2	Carolina RailHawks (NASL)	Cary, NC
7:07 PM EDT	Noonan 38'; Garcia (yellow card) 83'	Report	Shipalane (yellow card) 72', (goal) 75'; Shriver 88'	Stadium: WakeMed Soccer Park; Attendance: 7,939; Referee: Kevin Terry, Jr. (Tennessee)

May 29, 2012	New York Red Bulls (MLS)	3–0	Charleston Battery (USL Pro)	Charleston, SC
7:30 PM EDT	Cooper 14'; Pearce 42'; Lade 70'	Report	Sanyang (yellow card) 65'	Stadium: Blackbaud Stadium; Attendance: 3,527; Referee: Daniel Fitzgerald (North Carolina)

May 29, 2012	Dayton Dutch Lions (USL Pro)	2–1	Columbus Crew (MLS)	Columbus, OH
7:30 PM EDT	Bardsley (yellow card) 33', (goal) 81'; Bartels 79'; Knotek (yellow card) 87'	Report	Finlay (yellow card) 45+'; Vargas 64' (pen.)	Stadium: Crew Stadium; Attendance: 1,646; Referee: Sorin Stoica (Ohio)

May 29, 2012	Rochester Rhinos (USL Pro)	0–3	Philadelphia Union (MLS)	Chester, PA
7:30 PM EDT	Earls (yellow card) 40'; Traynor (yellow card) 52'; Rosenlund (yellow card) 90+'	Report	Martínez 5'; Adu 29', 73' (pen.); Lahoud (yellow card) 56'	Stadium: PPL Park; Attendance: 4,175; Referee: Robert Sibiga (New York)

May 29, 2012	Chicago Fire (MLS)	2–3 (a.e.t.)	Michigan Bucks (PDL)	Pontiac, MI
7:30 PM EDT	Paladini (yellow card) 25'; Bone 28'; Puppo 51'	Report	Catalano 9'; Crnkic (yellow card) 29', (goal) 93'; Boyden 79'	Stadium: Ultimate Soccer Arenas; Attendance: 2,006; Referee: Britton Maier (Ohio)

May 29, 2012	Colorado Rapids (MLS)	3–1	Tampa Bay Rowdies (NASL)	St. Petersburg, FL
7:30 PM EDT	Edu 17' (pen.); Akpan 33'; Thompson (yellow card) 54'; Marshall (yellow card) 57'; Hill 90'		Washington (yellow card) 56'; Claire 90+2'	Stadium: Al Lang Stadium; Attendance: 3,086; Referee: Donald Dellavia (Florida)

May 29, 2012	Orlando City (USL Pro)	2–3	Sporting Kansas City (MLS)	Kansas City, KS
7:30 PM CDT	Valentino (yellow card) 51'; Molino 55'; Pulis (red card) 70'; Chin 84'	Report	Collin (yellow card) 23'; Nagamura 45+2'; Saad 65', 69'; Peterson (yellow card) 78'	Stadium: Livestrong Sporting Park; Attendance: 12,217; Referee: Younes Marrakchi (Colorado)

May 29, 2012	Houston Dynamo (MLS)	0–1	San Antonio Scorpions (NASL)	San Antonio, TX
7:30 PM CDT	Recio (yellow card) 39'; Dixon (yellow card) 57'	Report	Cochrane (yellow card) 27'; Wagner (yellow card) 41'; Denissen 51' (pen.); Kling (yellow card) 63'; Gold (yellow card) 87'; Pitchkolan (yellow card) 90'	Stadium: Heroes Stadium; Attendance: 7,164; Referee: Ismail Elfath (Texas)

May 29, 2012	Charlotte Eagles (USL Pro)	2–0	FC Dallas (MLS)	Frisco, TX
7:30 PM CDT	Guzman (yellow card) 30'; Roberts 43'; Williams (yellow card) 72'; Thornton (yellow card) 84'; Thornton 90+4'	Report	Jackson (red card) 78'	Stadium: FC Dallas Stadium; Attendance: 1,702; Referee: Jorge Luna Hernandez (Texas)

May 29, 2012	Minnesota Stars (NASL)	3–1	Real Salt Lake (MLS)	Sandy, UT
7:00 PM MDT	Venegas 3'; Hlavaty 45' (pen.); Bracalello 58'	Report	Gil 29'; Velásquez (yellow card) 83'; Olave (yellow card) 85'	Stadium: Rio Tinto Stadium; Attendance: 17,212; Referee: Tyler Ploeger (Utah)

May 29, 2012	Chivas USA (MLS)	1–0	Ventura County Fusion (PDL)	Ventura, CA
7:00 PM PDT	Romero 13'; Gordon (yellow card) 45'; Ángel (yellow card) 70'	Report	Daly (yellow card) 60'; Chongo (yellow card) 64'; Chavez (yellow card) 88'	Stadium: Ventura College Sportsplex; Attendance: 3,000; Referee: Jesus Cisneros (California)

May 29, 2012	Fort Lauderdale Strikers (NASL)	1–2	San Jose Earthquakes (MLS)	Stanford, CA
7:30 PM PDT	Anderson 38'; Lorenz (yellow card) 55'; Restrepo (yellow card) 88'	Report	Morrow (yellow card) 50'; Garza 63', 70', (yellow card) 66'	Stadium: Laird Q. Cagan Stadium; Attendance: 1,271; Referee: Yader Reyes (California)

May 30, 2012	Atlanta Silverbacks (NASL)	1–5	Seattle Sounders FC (MLS)	Tukwila, WA
7:00 PM PDT	Navia 53' (yellow card) 59'; Davis (yellow card) 88'		Rose 44'; Alonso 47'; Caskey 54'; Burch (yellow card) 59'; Ochoa 62', 66'	Stadium: Starfire Sports Complex; Attendance: 3,703; Referee: Josh Wilkens (Washington)

May 30, 2012	Cal FC (USASA)	1–0 (a.e.t.)	Portland Timbers (MLS)	Portland, OR
7:30 PM PDT	Aghasyan 95'; Rivera (yellow card) 101'			Stadium: JELD-WEN Field; Attendance: 5,489; Referee: Will Niccolls (Washington)

=== Fourth round ===
June 5, 2012	Chivas USA (MLS)	2–1	Carolina RailHawks (NASL)	Cary, NC
7:07 PM EDT	Agudelo 31'; Gavin (yellow card) 37'; Riley (yellow card) 74'; Ángel 90+3' (pen.)	Report	Low (yellow card) 35'; Ortiz (yellow card) 48'; Lowery (yellow card) 55'; Palacio 79'	Stadium: WakeMed Soccer Park; Attendance: 7,117; Referee: Ted Unkel (Florida)

June 5, 2012	New York Red Bulls (MLS)	1–3 (a.e.t.)	Harrisburg City Islanders (USL Pro)	Harrisburg, PA
7:05 PM EDT	Lade 58'; Arteaga (yellow card) 90+2'; Holgersson (yellow card) 120'	Report	Touray 13', 94'; Duckett (yellow card) 28'; Welker (yellow card) 38'; Pelletier (yellow card) 87'; Basso (yellow card) 90+2'; Noble (yellow card) 115'; Mkosana 117'	Stadium: Skyline Sports Complex; Attendance: 1,477; Referee: Robert Sibiga (New York)

June 5, 2012	Philadelphia Union (MLS)	2–1 (a.e.t.)	D.C. United (MLS)	Boyds, MD
7:30 PM EDT	Carroll 45+1'; Valdes (yellow card) 55' (red card) 113'; Martinez (yellow card) 64'; M. Farfan (yellow card) 82'; Hoppenot 93'	Report	McDonald (yellow card) 13' (red card) 113'; Dudar (yellow card) 27'; Wolff 45+1'	Stadium: Maryland SoccerPlex; Attendance: 3,276; Referee: Jose Carlos Rivero (New York)

June 5, 2012	Dayton Dutch Lions (USL Pro)	2–1 (a.e.t.)	Michigan Bucks (PDL)	Rochester, MI
7:30 PM EDT	Garner 13'; DeLasse 97' (pen.)	Report	Grant 55'	Stadium: Oakland University Soccer Field; Attendance: 1,100; Referee: Kevin Terry, Jr. (Tennessee)

June 5, 2012	Colorado Rapids (MLS)	0–2	Sporting Kansas City (MLS)	Kansas City, KS
7:30 PM CDT	Larentowicz (yellow card) 58'; Freeman (yellow card) 85'; LaBauex (yellow card) 88'	Report	Collin (yellow card) 14'; Pickens 27' (o.g.); César (yellow card) 33'; Bunbury 79'	Stadium: Livestrong Sporting Park; Attendance: 14,868; Referee: Matthew Foerster (Texas)

June 5, 2012	Charlotte Eagles (USL Pro)	2–1 (a.e.t.)	San Antonio Scorpions (NASL)	San Antonio, TX
7:30 PM CDT	Grousis 27'; Bateau (yellow card) 61'; Salles 117' (pen.)	Report	Campos 75'	Stadium: Heroes Stadium; Attendance: 5,112; Referee: Jasen Anno (Texas)

June 5, 2012	Cal FC (USASA)	0–5	Seattle Sounders FC (MLS)	Tukwila, WA
7:00 PM PDT	Menjivar (yellow card) 74'	TV: Fox Soccer	Alonso (yellow card) 19'; Ochoa (yellow card) 45'; Alonso 50', 70'; Montero 58', 68'; Caskey 66'	Stadium: Starfire Sports Complex; Attendance: 3,894; Referee: Daniel Radford (California)

June 5, 2012	Minnesota Stars (NASL)	0–1	San Jose Earthquakes (MLS)	Stanford, CA
8:00 PM PDT	Altman (yellow card) 42'; Davis (yellow card) 60'; Kallman (yellow card) 90+3'		Beitashour (yellow card) 46'; Corrales (yellow card) 55'; Lenhart 85'	Stadium: Laird Q. Cagan Stadium; Attendance: 1,548; Referee: Alejandro Mariscal (California)

=== Quarterfinals ===
June 26, 2012	Harrisburg City Islanders (USL Pro)	2–5	Philadelphia Union (MLS)	Chester, PA
7:30 PM EDT	Ombiji 51'; Langley 54'; Marshall (yellow card) 60'; Langley (yellow card) 74'; Pelletier (yellow card) 78'	Report	Adu 5' (pen.); McInerney 9'; Pajoy 29', 68' (pen.); Gómez 81'; McInerney (yellow card) 90+2'	Stadium: PPL Park; Attendance: 4,313; Referee: Daniel Fitzgerald (North Carolina)

June 26, 2012	Dayton Dutch Lions (USL Pro)	0–3	Sporting Kansas City (MLS)	Kansas City, KS
7:30 PM CDT		Report	Sapong 4', 59'; Zusi 56'	Stadium: Livestrong Sporting Park; Attendance: 15,167; Referee: Fotis Bazakos (Minnesota)

June 26, 2012	Charlotte Eagles (USL Pro)	1−2	Chivas USA (MLS)	Fullerton, CA
7:30 PM PDT	Salles 89'	Report	Correa 65', 90+4'	Stadium: Titan Stadium; Attendance: 1,500; Referee: Chris Penso (Ohio)

June 26, 2012	Seattle Sounders FC (MLS)	1−0	San Jose Earthquakes (MLS)	San Francisco, CA
7:30 PM PDT	Cato 19'; Scott (yellow card) 51'; Rose (yellow card) 82'; Burch (yellow card) 90+4'	Report	Gordon (yellow card) 49' (red card) 90+3'; Beitashour (yellow card) 68'; Morrow (yellow card) 75'	Stadium: Kezar Stadium; Attendance: 7,219; Referee: Yader Reyes (California)

=== Semifinals ===
July 11, 2012	Sporting Kansas City (MLS)	2–0	Philadelphia Union (MLS)	Chester, PA
7:30 PM EDT	Nagamura (yellow card) 52'; Peterson 65'; Collin (yellow card) 77'; Zusi 90+'	Report	G. Farfan (yellow card) 30'; M. Farfan (yellow card) 52'; Lahoud (yellow card) 57'; Williams (yellow card) 62'	Stadium: PPL Park; Attendance: 8,486; Referee: Hilario Grajeda (Ohio)

July 11, 2012	Chivas USA (MLS)	1–4	Seattle Sounders FC (MLS)	Tukwila, WA
7:00 PM PDT	Minda (yellow card) 44'; Romero 74'; Califf (yellow card) 78'	Report	Johnson 31'; Alonso (yellow card) 42' (goal) 48'; Evans 83'; Ochoa 88'	Stadium: Starfire Sports Complex; Attendance: 4,500; Referee: Chris Penso (Ohio)

=== Final ===
August 8, 2012	Seattle Sounders FC (MLS)	1–1 (a.e.t.) (2–3 p)	Sporting Kansas City (MLS)	Kansas City, KS
7:30 PM CDT	Rosales (yellow card) 57'; Ianni (yellow card) 73' (red card) 119'; Scott 86' (yellow card) 93'	Report; Report	Kamara 83' (pen.)	Stadium: Livestrong Sporting Park; Attendance: 18,863; Referee: Ricardo Salazar (California)
	Penalties
	Evans (penalty scored); Burch (penalty scored); Alonso (penalty missed); Tiffert (penalty missed); Johnson (penalty missed)		Kamara (penalty scored); Espinoza (penalty missed); Besler (penalty scored); Zusi (penalty missed); Nagamura (penalty scored)

== Top scorers ==
Statistics current through the Cup Final.

Rank	Scorer	Club	Goals
1	(United States) Brian Shriver	Carolina RailHawks	5
2	(United States) Danny Barrera	Cal FC	4
2	(Cuba) Osvaldo Alonso	Seattle Sounders FC	4
2	(United States) Frankie López	Ventura County Fusion	4
5	(Armenia) Artur Aghasyan	Cal FC	3
5	(United States) Nate Thornton	Charlotte Eagles	3
5	(United States) Aly Hassan	Fort Lauderdale Strikers	3
5	(Kenya) Brian Ombiji	Harrisburg City Islanders	3
5	(The Gambia) Sainey Touray	Harrisburg City Islanders	3
5	(United States) Freddy Adu	Philadelphia Union	3
5	(United States) Sammy Ochoa	Seattle Sounders FC	3
