= 2012 Charleston Battery season =

Charleston Battery
2012 season
- Owner: Tony Bakker
- Manager: Michael Anhaeuser
- Stadium: Blackbaud Stadium
- USL Pro: 3rd place
- USL Pro Playoffs: Champions
- U.S. Open Cup: 3rd Rd
- Carolina Challenge Cup: 4th
- Top goalscorer: Jose Cuevas and Nicki Paterson
- Highest home attendance: 4,729
- Lowest home attendance: 3,162
- Average home league attendance: 3,825
Home colors	Away colors

The 2012 Charleston Battery season was the club's twentieth season of existence. It is the Battery's third consecutive year in the third tier of American soccer, playing in the USL Professional Division for their second season.

== Background ==
The Charleston Battery are coming off their inaugural year of playing in the USL Professional Division, the highest division of soccer under the United Soccer Leagues umbrella, and the third division in the American soccer pyramid. The Battery, finished fourth in the American Division of USL Pro, and had the fifth best overall record in the league. In the USL Pro Playoffs, the Battery lost to the eventual champions, Orlando City in extra time.

== Competitions ==
=== Carolina Challenge Cup ===
February 24, 2012 Group 1	Charleston Battery	2–2	Columbus Crew	Charleston, South Carolina
19:15 UTC-5	Falvey (yellow card) 30'; Kelly 40'; Flatley (yellow card) 42'; Cuevas 89'	Report	Gaven 6'; Mendes (yellow card) 45'; Mirosevic 58'; Tchani (yellow card) 61'; Mendes (yellow card) 89' (red card)	Stadium: Blackbaud Stadium; Attendance: 5,700

February 26, 2012 Group 2	Charleston Battery	1–3	D.C. United	Charleston, South Carolina
15:00 UTC-5	Cuevas 29'; Wiltse (red card) 76'	Report	Maicon Santos 13'; Richter 31'; Salihi 88'	Stadium: Blackbaud Stadium

February 29, 2012 Group 3	Charleston Battery	—	Chicago Fire	Charleston, South Carolina
19:15 UTC-5				Stadium: Blackbaud Stadium
Note: Match cancelled due to inclement weather.

=== USL Pro ===
April 7, 2012 1	Richmond Kickers	1–2	Charleston Battery	Richmond, VA
	Nyazamba 45'; Görres (yellow card) 70'	Report	Cuevas 41', 67'; Richter (yellow card) 80'	Attendance: 5,009; Referee: Moo Hacket

April 14, 2012 2	Charleston Battery	1–2	Richmond Kickers	Charleston, SC
	Paterson 19'; Falvey (yellow card) 61'		Nyazamba 63'; Nyazamba (yellow card) 79'; Callahan (yellow card) 81'; Görres 90'	Attendance: 4,729; Referee: Sky Arthur Banning

April 17, 2012 3	Charlotte Eagles	0–3	Charleston Battery	Rock Hill, SC
			Donatelli 22'; Richter 44'; Mack 86'	Attendance: 576; Referee: Daniel Thornberry

April 27, 2012 4	Charleston Battery	1–0	Pittsburgh Riverhounds	Charleston, SC
	Paterson 9'; Kelly (yellow card) 81'		Lundberg (yellow card) 38'; Katic (yellow card) 50'	Attendance: 3,269; Referee: Juan Colazo

May 4, 2012 5	Charleston Battery	4–0	Antigua Barracuda	Charleston, SC
	Cuevas 46'; Paterson 74'; Bundu 80'; Kelly 90'	Report	Smith (yellow card) 16'; Robinson (yellow card) 34'; Thomas (yellow card) 69'; Griffith (yellow card) 87'	Attendance: 3,162; Referee: Agostino Minasola

May 12, 2012 6	Charleston Battery	0–1	Rochester Rhinos	Charleston, SC
	Flatley (yellow card) 70'	Report	Earls 61'; McManus (yellow card) 72'	Attendance: 3,819; Referee: Sky Banning

May 26, 2012 7	Charleston Battery	1–0	LA Blues	Charleston, SC
	Falvey (yellow card) 12'; Falvey 13'; Hoffer (yellow card) 18'	Report	Russell (yellow card) 45'; JAtta (yellow card) 49'; Cheunyeung (yellow card) 78'; Miller (yellow card) 86'; Spitz (yellow card) 88'	Attendance: 4,144; Referee: Patrick O'Brian

May 31, 2012 8	Pittsburgh Riverhounds	1–3	Charleston Battery	Pittsburgh, PA
	Katic (yellow card) 26'; Flunder (yellow card) 45'; Kassel (red card) 57'; Costanzo 60'	Report	Flatley (yellow card) 7'; Hoffer (yellow card) 29'; Paterson 45', 45+2'; Kelly (yellow card) 52' (goal) 69'; Bundu (yellow card) 87'	Attendance: 532; Referee: (United States) Ron D'Ambrosia

June 2, 2012 9	Dayton Dutch Lions	0–1	Charleston Battery	Dayton, OH
		Report	Cuevas 72'

June 9, 2012 10	Orlando City	2–1	Charleston Battery	Orlando, FL
	Alexandre 7'; Boden (yellow card) 41'; Watson 57'	Report	Paterson 38'	Attendance: 5,602; Referee: (United States) Cedric Adams

June 15, 2012 11	Charleston Battery	3–0	Antigua Barracuda	Charleston, SC
	Kelly (yellow card) 21' (goal) 44'; Paterson 33' 62' (pen.)	Report	Dublin (yellow card) 10'; Robinson (yellow card) 21' (red card) 22'; Blakely (yellow card) 32'; James (yellow card) 87'; Thomas (yellow card) 89'	Attendance: 3,244; Referee: (United States) Patrick Baker

June 23, 2012 12	Charleston Battery	3–1	Harrisburg City Islanders	Charleston, SC
	Cuevas 45+1'; Boyd 50'; Sanyang (yellow card) 72'; Paterson (yellow card) 76'; Richter 87'	Report	Welker (yellow card) 41' (yellow-red card) 86'; Mellor 52'	Attendance: 4,634; Referee: (United States) Sky Banning

June 29, 2012 13	Antigua Barracuda	0–2	Charleston Battery	St. George, Antigua, Antigua and Barbuda
		Report	Sanyang (yellow card) 20'; Cuevas 75'; Mack 90'	Referee: (Antigua and Barbuda) Bryan Willett

July 1, 2012 14	Antigua Barracuda	1–0	Charleston Battery	St. George, Antigua, Antigua and Barbuda
	Byers 46'	Report	Prince (yellow card) 2'; Paterson (yellow card) 45'; Cody Ellison (red card) 76'

July 6, 2012 15	Charleston Battery	0–2	Charlotte Eagles	Charleston, SC
		Report	Nathan Thornton 48'; Guzman 79'

July 7, 2012 16	Charlotte Eagles	1–0	Charleston Battery	Charlotte, NC
	Roberts 36'	Summary	Paterson (yellow card) 75'

July 14, 2012 17	Charleston Battery	3–1	Wilmington Hammerheads	Charleston, SC
	Boyd 6'; Kelly 60'; Paterson 66'	Summary	Musa (yellow card) 28'; Budnyi 47'; Riley (yellow card) 68'

July 19, 2012 18	Charleston Battery	1–2	Orlando City	Charleston, SC
	Cuevas 64'	Summary	Molino (yellow card) 30'; Fuller (yellow card) 70' (goal) 90+4'; Luzunaris 90'

July 28, 2012 19	Orlando City	4–0	Charleston Battery	Orlando, FL
	Hoffer 16' (o.g.); Luzunaris 21'; O'Connor (red card) 59'; Chin 77', 85'	Summary	Hoffer (yellow card) 57' (yellow-red card) 66'; Falvey (red card) 59'; Wilson (yellow card) 90+1'; Boyd (yellow card) 90+2'

August 3, 2012 20	Charleston Battery	2–2	Wilmington Hammerheads	Charleston, SC
7:30pm	Kelly (yellow card) 45'; Paterson 50'; Boyd (yellow card) 71'; Mueller 78'; Wilson (yellow card) 90'	Summary	Cuero 35'; Riley (yellow card) 45'; Rodriguez (yellow card) 74' (yellow-red card) 89'; Perry 81'

August 4, 2012 21	Wilmington Hammerheads	2–1	Charleston Battery	Wilmington, NC
	Evans 34'; Riley (yellow card) 41'; Hertzog 45'; Cole (yellow card) 71'; Lassiter (yellow card) 73'	Summary	Romero 27'; Mueller (yellow card) 64'; Boyd (yellow card) 84'; Michael Azira (red card) 90+2'

August 8, 2012 22	Harrisburg City Islanders	3–0	Charleston Battery	Harrisburg, PA
	Ombiji 30'; Mellor 36'; Jordan (yellow card) 39'; Marshall (yellow card) 63'; Mkosana 83'	Summary	Hoffer (red card) 25'; Sanyang (yellow card) 43'; Richter (yellow card) 58'; Falvey (yellow card) 64'

August 11, 2012 23	Rochester Rhinos	0–4	Charleston Battery	Rochester, NY
		Summary	Donatelli 18', 30'; Sanyang 45+1'; Kelly 86'

August 18, 2012 24	Charleston Battery	0–0	Dayton Dutch Lions	Charleston, SC
	Cuevas (yellow card) 40'	Summary	Copier (yellow card) 77'; Dias (yellow card) 77'; Jones (yellow card) 79'

==== Standings ====
Pos	Team	Pld	W	T	L	GF	GA	GD	Pts	Qualification
1	Orlando City SC (C)	24	17	6	1	50	18	+32	57	Commissioner's Cup, Playoffs 1st round bye
2	Rochester Rhinos (A)	24	12	5	7	27	23	+4	41	Playoffs 1st round bye
3	Charleston Battery (A)	24	12	2	10	36	26	+10	38	Playoffs
4	Richmond Kickers (A)	24	11	5	8	31	27	+4	38	Playoffs
5	Wilmington Hammerheads (A)	24	10	7	7	34	32	+2	37	Playoffs
6	Harrisburg City Islanders (A)	24	10	7	7	34	29	+5	37	Playoffs
7	Charlotte Eagles	24	11	3	10	34	26	+8	36	
8	Los Angeles Blues	24	9	3	12	26	29	−3	30	
9	Dayton Dutch Lions	24	4	10	10	20	29	−9	22	
10	Pittsburgh Riverhounds	24	4	5	15	20	39	−19	17	
11	Antigua Barracuda	24	5	1	18	16	50	−34	16	

Source: USL Pro official standings
Rules for classification: Points, then tiebreak: 1) Head-to-head record based on total points in League games, 2) Total wins in League games, 3) Goal difference in League games, 4) Goals scored in League games, etc.
(A) Advances to USL Pro Playoffs; (C) Commissioner's Cup (best regular season record)

=== USL Pro Playoffs ===
August 25, 2012 1st	Charleston Battery	2–1	Harrisburg City Islanders	Charleston, South Carolina
7:30 pm EDT	Patterson 40' (pen.) (yellow card) 89'; Donatelli 45+1'; Richter (yellow card) 80'	Report; Report	Ombiji 16'; Mellor (yellow card) 45'; Pelletier (yellow card) 53'; Basso (yellow card) 77'	Stadium: Blackbaud Stadium; Attendance: 2,718; Referee: Augie Minasola

August 31, 2012 SF	Rochester Rhinos	1–1 (a.e.t.) (3–4 p)	Charleston Battery	Rochester, New York
7:35 pm EDT	McFayden 55'; McManus (yellow card) 57'; Hoxie (yellow card) 76'; Cost (yellow card) 80'; Fernandez (yellow card) 90'	Report; Report	Donatelli 90+'; Hoffer (yellow card) 114'	Stadium: Sahlen's Stadium; Referee: Vito Testa, Jr.
	Penalties
	Hoxie (penalty missed); Kyriazis (penalty scored); Earls (penalty scored); Zamudio (penalty scored); Roberts (penalty missed); Nicht (penalty missed); Rosenlund (penalty missed)		(penalty scored) Patterson; (penalty missed) Donatelli; (penalty scored) Azira; (penalty missed) Falvey; (penalty scored) Prince; (penalty missed) Wilson; (penalty scored) Mack

September 8, 2012 F	Charleston Battery	1–0	Wilmington Hammerheads	Charleston, South Carolina
7:30 pm EDT	Michael Azira 74'; Falvey (yellow card) 75'; Wiltse (yellow card) 86'	Summary	Cole (yellow card) 34'; Chirishian (yellow card) 46'; Musa (yellow card) 66'	Stadium: Blackbaud Stadium

=== U.S. Open Cup ===
May 22, 2012 Second round	Charleston Battery (South Carolina)	2–1	(Pennsylvania) Reading United	Charleston, SC
19:30 ET	Kelly 69'; Paterson 79'		Ibikunle 64'	Referee: Skye Arthur-Banning

May 29, 2012 Third round	Charleston Battery (South Carolina)	0–3	(New Jersey) New York Red Bulls	Charleston, SC
19:30 ET	Cooper 14'; Pearce 42'; Lade 70'		Sanyang (yellow card) 65'	Attendance: 3,527; Referee: Daniel Fitzgerald

== Statistics ==
=== Appearances and goals ===
No.	Pos	Nat	Player	Total		USL Pro		U.S. Open Cup	
No.	Pos	Nat	Player	Apps	Goals	Apps	Goals	Apps	Goals
1	GK	(United States) USA	Alec Kann	0	0	0+0	0	0+0	0
2	DF	(United States) USA	Mark Wiltse	1	0	1+0	0	0+0	0
4	DF	(United States) USA	Cody Ellsion	0	0	0+0	0	0+0	0
6	DF	(United States) USA	Kyle Hoffer	1	0	1+0	0	0+0	0
7	MF	(United States) USA	Ryan Richter	1	0	1+0	0	0+0	0
8	MF	(Scotland) SCO	Nicki Paterson	1	0	1+0	0	0+0	0
9	FW	(Jamaica) JAM	Dane Kelly	0	0	0+0	0	0+0	0
11	FW	(Sierra Leone) SLE	Sallieu Bundu	1	0	1+0	0	0+0	0
12	MF	(United States) USA	Jose Cuevas	1	2	1+0	2	0+0	0
14	MF	(United States) USA	Tony Donatelli	0	0	0+0	0	0+0	0
15	DF	(United States) USA	Taylor Mueller	1	0	1+0	0	0+0	0
17	MF	(United States) USA	Charlie Romero	0	0	0+0	0	0+0	0
20	MF	(United States) USA	J.C. Mack	0	0	0+0	0	0+0	0
22	DF	(United States) USA	Sean Flatley	1	0	1+0	0	0+0	0
23	MF	(The Gambia) GAM	Amadou Sanyang	1	0	1+0	0	0+0	0
24	FW	(United States) USA	Zach Prince	1	0	1+0	0	0+0	0
25	DF	(United States) USA	John Wilson	1	0	1+0	0	0+0	0
30	GK	(United States) USA	Kevin Klasila	0	0	0+0	0	0+0	0
32	DF	(Republic of Ireland) IRL	Colin Falvey	1	0	1+0	0	0+0	0

== Transfers ==
=== Players in ===
Date	Pos.	Name	From	Fee
6 January 2012	DF	(United States) Kyle Hoffer	(United States) FC New York	Undisclosed
6 January 2012	MF	(United States) Jose Cuevas	(United States) Fresno Fuego	Undisclosed
20 March 2012	FW	(Sierra Leone) Sallieu Bundu	(United States) Carolina Railhawks	Undisclosed
28 March 2012	MF	(United States) Tony Donatelli	(United States) Rochester Rhinos	Undisclosed
28 March 2012	DF	(United States) Cody Ellison	(United States) Fresno Fuego	Undisclosed
28 March 2012	MF	(United States) Ryan Richter	(United States) Philadelphia Union	Undisclosed
6 April 2012	MF	(The Gambia) Amadou Sanyang	(United States) Seattle Sounders FC	Undisclosed

=== Players out ===
Date	Pos.	Name	To	Fee
9 March 2012	MF	(United States) Alex Caskey	(United States) Seattle Sounders FC	Undisclosed
27 Feb. 2012	GK	(United States) Andrew Dykstra	(United States) D.C. United	Undisclosed

== See also ==
- 2012 in American soccer
- 2012 USL Pro season
- Charleston Battery
