= Stanislaus United =

- Full name: Stanislaus United Soccer Club
- League: US Club Soccer NorCal Premier Soccer League
- Website: http://www.suscsoccer.com/

Stanislaus United Soccer Club is an amateur soccer team located in Modesto, California that competes in the US Club Soccer NorCal Premier Soccer League. They are best known for being the first US Club Soccer team to qualify for the US Open Cup, defeating the Bay Area Ambassadors of the NPSL 3-0 in a 2012 Open Cup qualifier before losing to the Fresno Fuego of the PDL 2-0 in the first round of the tournament.
