= US Club Soccer =

National soccer organization

CONCACAF
- Founded: 2001; 25 years ago
- Headquarters: Charleston, South Carolina
- CONCACAF affiliation: US Soccer
- Website: usclubsoccer.org

National Association of Competitive Soccer Clubs (US Club Soccer) is a national non-profit organization and member of the United States Soccer Federation that works to develop and support soccer clubs in the United States.

== Organization ==
US Club Soccer gained recognized as a national organization by the United States Soccer Federation in 2001. The initial intent of the organization was to be a lobbying organization to effect change in United States Youth Soccer Association, but it had to change to a player-based organization to gain momentum. The organization's philosophy is that clubs are the primary vehicle for player development, and should be the primary decision makers for both structure and organization. Based on this philosophy, the organization's board of directors is made up of members who currently hold national coaching licenses. By bringing all age groups of soccer together under one organization, US Club Soccer hopes to foster a member-for-life culture within their clubs.

US Club Soccer is run by a board of directors that is made up of the chairperson, 2 representatives from each of the four regions, at-large director, and the CEO.

== Programming ==
US Club Soccer's developed four programs which include Players First, league- and cup-based competition, player identification and development programs, and additional programs geared toward club support and coaching education.

=== Players First ===
Players First is a branded club soccer program for parents and players, which aims to help parents make better choices about where their children should play. In order to help members adopt Players First, US Club Soccer provides resources for clubs, coaches, parents and players. The program is based on five pillars, which include Club Development, Coaching Development, Player Development, Parent Engagement & Education, and Player Health & Safety.

=== League-based programs ===
League-based programming includes the National Premier Leagues (NPL) and Premier Leagues, a collection of US Club Soccer's top leagues from around the country. Champions of the various NPLs advance to the NPL Finals, the organization's annual league-based national championship competition. In addition, US Club Soccer sanctions local competitive leagues, recreational programs and adult leagues. The Elite Clubs National League is sanctioned by US Club Soccer.

=== Cup-based programs ===
Cup-based programming includes state championship events and US Club Soccer's second national championship, the National Cup, which is open to all members and encompasses a series of regional and state competitions.

=== id2 Program ===
Established in 2004, the id2 National Identification and Development Program gives all players (regardless of affiliation) a chance to be identified, developed and scouted for inclusion in the U.S. national team programs. A national scouting and recommendation program is used to form a pool from which top players are invited to attend an id2 Training Camp. In addition to on-field sessions, the camps feature guest speakers, lectures/classroom sessions and other offerings. Both the id2 Program and Player Development Programs are Olympic Development Programs as approved by the United States Olympic Committee and U.S. Soccer Federation.

==== Player Development Programs (PDPs) ====
Another part of the id2 Program, PDPs are regional identification and development events centered on the National Premier Leagues. Players (both in the NPL and with nearby clubs) receive invitations based on performance and recommendations, and once at a PDP event, they receive coaching and can play in front of U.S. Soccer scouts.

== U.S. Open Cup ==
US Club Soccer's adult teams are eligible for the Lamar Hunt U.S. Open Cup, which they may reach through a qualifying process. US Club Soccer received a full slot in the 2013 U.S. Open Cup (a step forward from its previous allotment of a half-slot), meaning qualifying teams move directly into the tournament without needing to win a play-in game.

In 2012, Stanislaus United Turlock Express became the first US Club Soccer team to reach the cup tournament proper, which it accomplished by defeating the National Premier Soccer League’s Bay Area Ambassadors in a play-in game.

Year	US Soccer representative	US Open Cup opponent	Result
2012	Stanislaus United Turlock Express	First round - Fresno Fuego (PDL)	0-2
2013	Fresno Fuego Future	Preliminary Round - FC Hasental (NPSL)	3-5
2014	SC Corinthians USA	First round - San Diego Flash (NPSL)	forfeit
2015	San Francisco City FC	Preliminary Round - Cal FC	1-2
2016	San Francisco City FC	First round - CD Aguiluchos USA (NPSL)	0-3
2020	Chula Vista FC	Postponed due to COVID-19	
2021	Chula Vista FC	Postponed due to COVID-19	
2022	D'Feeters Kicks Soccer Club	Second Round — San Antonio FC	1–3
