= Central Jersey Spartans =

- Full name: Central Jersey Spartans
- Nickname: Spartans
- Founded: 2009
- Dissolved: 2013
- Ground: Rider University; Lawrenceville, New Jersey
- Capacity: 1,000
- Owner: Sal Amato
- Head Coach: James Quinn
- League: USL Premier Development League
- 2013: 8th, Mid Atlantic; Playoffs: DNQ
- Website: http://www.cjspartans.com
Home colors	Away colors

Central Jersey Spartans was an American soccer team based in Lawrenceville, New Jersey, United States. Founded in 2009, the team played in the USL Premier Development League (PDL), the fourth tier of the American Soccer Pyramid, in the Mid Atlantic Division of the Eastern Conference.

The team played its home games at Falcon Field in nearby Hillsborough, New Jersey, where they have played since 2011. The team's colors were blue, white and gold.

== History ==
The Central Jersey Spartans were announced as PDL expansion team in November 2009. They played their first official game on May 12, 2010, a 2–0 loss to Newark Ironbound Express.

== Players ==
=== Notable former players ===
This list of notable former players comprises players who went on to play professional soccer after playing for the team in the Premier Development League, or those who previously played professionally before joining the team.

- (United States) R. J. Allen
- (Colombia) José Angulo
- (Peru) Nelson Becerra
- (United States) Scott Caldwell
- (United States) Greg Cochrane
- (United States) Ryan Finley
- (United States) Antoine Hoppenot
- (United States) Ryan Kinne
- (United States) Bryan Meredith
- (United States) Jon Okafor
- (United States) Teddy Schneider
- (United States) Mark Wiltse

== Year-by-year ==
Year	Division	League	Regular season	Playoffs	Open Cup
2010	4	USL PDL	3rd, Mid Atlantic	Did not qualify	Did not qualify
2011	4	USL PDL	5th, Mid Atlantic	Did not qualify	Did not qualify
2012	4	USL PDL	8th, Mid Atlantic	Did not qualify	Did not qualify
2013	4	USL PDL	8th, Mid Atlantic	Did not qualify	Did not qualify

== Head coaches ==
- (Northern Ireland) Sam Nellins (2010–2012)
- (England) John Newman (2012–2013)
- (Northern Ireland) James Quinn (2013–present)

== Stadia ==
- Stadium at Rider University; Lawrenceville, New Jersey (2010–2011)
- Stadium at The College of New Jersey; Ewing Township, New Jersey 2 games (2010)
- PDA Complex; Zarephath, New Jersey 1 game (2010)
- Falcon Field; Hillsborough, New Jersey (2011–2013)

== Average attendance ==
Attendance stats are calculated by averaging each team's self-reported home attendances from the historical match archive at https://web.archive.org/web/20100105175057/http://www.uslsoccer.com/history/index_E.html.

- 2010: 100
