= Jeritt Thayer =

American soccer player

Personal information
- Full name: Jeritt Thayer
- Date of birth: May 3, 1986 (age 40)
- Place of birth: Corona del Mar, California, United States
- Height: 6 ft 1 in (1.85 m)
- Position: Midfielder

Youth career
- 2004–2007: New York University Violets

Senior career*
Years	Team	Apps	(Gls)
2008–2009	Wilmington Hammerheads	34	(1)
2010–2011	Harrisburg City Islanders	42	(2)
- * Club domestic league appearances and goals as of August 29, 2013

Jeritt Thayer (born May 3, 1986, in Corona del Mar, California) is a former American soccer player.

== Career ==
=== College ===
Thayer played club soccer for the Irvine Strikers and the Wolfpack Soccer Club, and played college soccer at New York University from 2004 to 2007. He began his college career as a defender and finished it as a midfielder, having scored thirty-five career goals. In 2006, he was a second team Division III All American.

=== Professional ===
Thayer turned professional in 2008 when he joined the Wilmington Hammerheads in the USL Second Division. He made his professional debut on April 26, 2008, in Wilmington's opening day 2–0 loss to the Bermuda Hogges.

== Honors ==
=== Wilmington Hammerheads ===
- USL Second Division Regular Season Champions (1): 2009
