= Capital City Islanders =

The Capital City Islanders are an American professional soccer team based in Harrisburg, Pennsylvania and plays in the United Premier Soccer League (UPSL) Division 1 American Conference. The team plays at City Island's Skyline Sports Complex, which previously was the home of the Harrisburg City Islanders. The Capital City Islanders were founded and are owned by Alex McGee and the Capital City Sports Group.

== History ==
=== League ===
United Premier Soccer League Division 1 - Inaugural Season (2025)

The Capital City Islanders were announced as a new professional soccer team on January 23, 2025. The team announced Adam Morris as head coach of their inaugural season. The Capital City Islanders ended the Spring 2025 season winning eight games, 1 draw, and 2 defeats -- giving them 25 points and the top spot in the Northeast American (South) conference.
