= David Schofield (footballer) =

English footballer

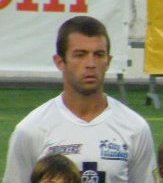
- Schofield representing the Harrisburg City Islanders

Personal information
- Date of birth: 15 October 1981 (age 45)
- Place of birth: Preston, England
- Height: 5 ft 9 in (1.75 m)
- Position: Midfielder

Youth career
- 1992–1998: Blackburn Rovers

College career
Years	Team	Apps	(Gls)
2000–2003	Long Island Blackbirds		

Senior career*
Years	Team	Apps	(Gls)
2004–2011	Harrisburg City Islanders	130	(7)
2005–2006	Philadelphia KiXX (indoor)	20	(?)
2012–2014	Harrisburg Heat (indoor)	33	(20)
- * Club domestic league appearances and goals as of 19 June 2014

David Schofield (born 15 October 1981) is an English footballer.

== Career ==
=== Youth and college ===
Schofield was a member of the schoolboy academy at the famous English club Blackburn Rovers, but was never offered a senior contract by the team. He moved to the United States in 2000 to attend and play college soccer at Long Island University, where he was a three-time all conference pick.

=== Professional ===
Schofield turned professional in 2004 when he signed with the Harrisburg City Islanders in the USL Second Division, and has been there ever since. He leads the way in appearances made for the City Islanders with 130 league matches played to date.

The only remaining player from the 2004 squad, Schofield was an All-League second team selection in 2005 and led the team to the 2007 USL2 Championship. The Englishman is also the most prolific playmaker in club history, ranking first all-time with 27 assists.

On 2 February 2010 Harrisburg City announced the re-signing of Schofield for the 2010 season.

Following the close of the 2011 season, Schofield retired from the City Islanders and is still the club's all-time record appearances holder with 130 USL appearances.

Schofield also has professional indoor soccer experience, having played with the Philadelphia KiXX and Harrisburg Heat (MASL).

=== International ===
Schofield played for the England Schoolboys Under-18s team, but has never played for any of his country's senior teams. He did represent Great Britain in the summer of 2005 at the World University Games (2005 Summer Universiade) in Turkey.
