= Skyline Sports Complex =

Sports complex in Harrisburg, Pennsylvania

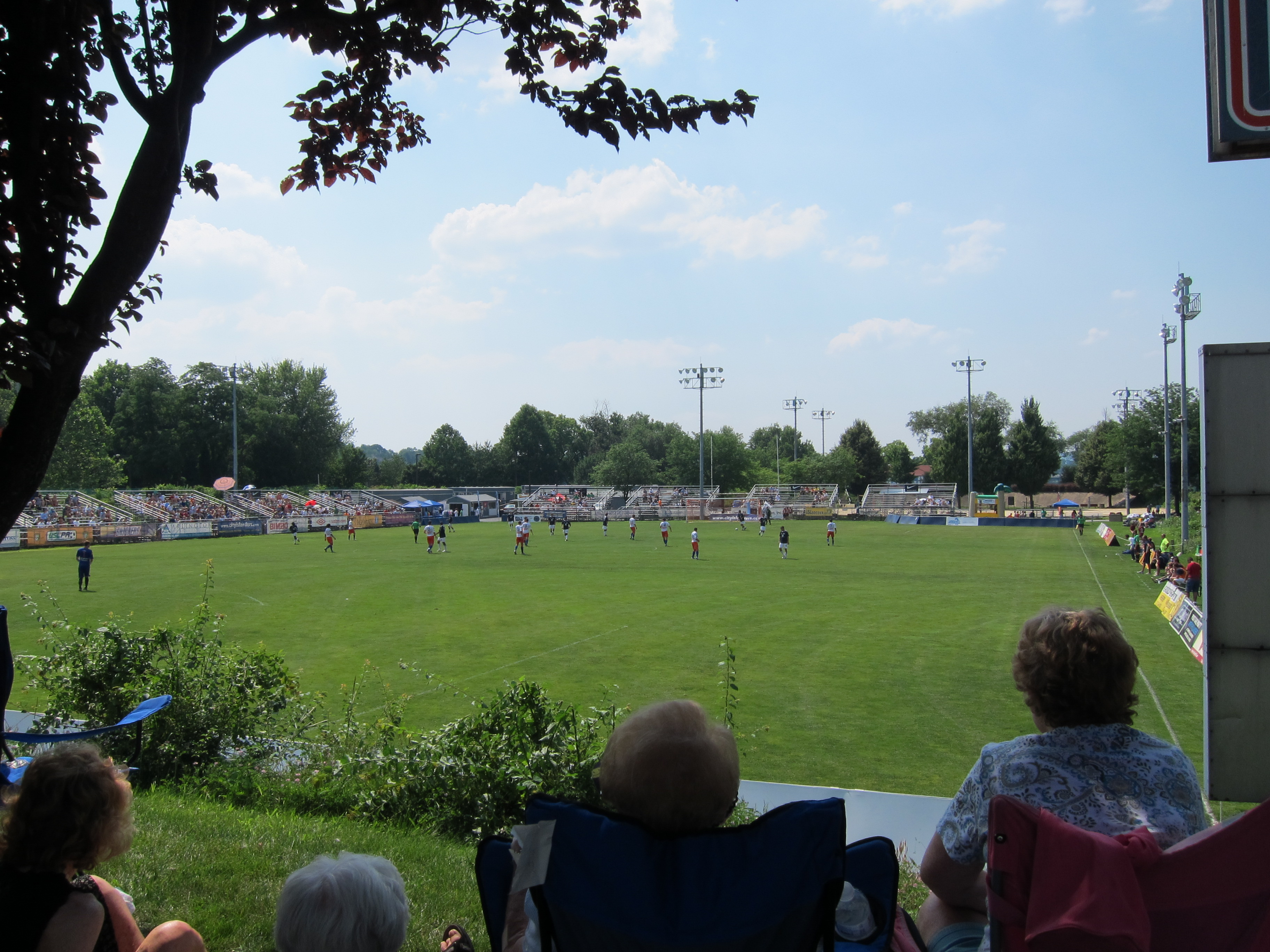
- Harrisburg City Islanders playing at the Skyline Sports Complex
- Interactive map of Skyline Sports Complex
- Location: 201 Championship Way, Harrisburg, Pennsylvania
- Coordinates: 40°15′26.88″N 76°53′27.90″W
- Owner: City of Harrisburg
- Operator: Harrisburg Parks & Recreation
- Capacity: Soccer/ Football: 2,200; Concerts: 4,000
- Surface: Grass

Construction
- Built: 1987
- Renovated: 2008

Tenants
- Central Penn Piranha (1995–2015); Harrisburg City Islanders/Penn FC (USL) (2004–2015); Capital City Islanders (UPSL Division 1) (2025–Present)

Skyline Sports Complex is a sports complex/stadium on City Island, along the Susquehanna River, in Harrisburg, Pennsylvania.

Located adjacent to FNB Field, the stadium and complex hosts numerous events annually and was the home stadium for the Harrisburg City Islanders soccer team, known as Penn FC in their final season in 2016. It was also formerly home to the Central Penn Piranha football team.

== History ==
The original structure was built by the City of Harrisburg in 1987.

The field was under renovation in 2008, which included repositioning and the planting of new grass, in preparation for the 2009 Islanders' season. The upgrade project was headed by Mayor Stephen R. Reed and completed internally by the City of Harrisburg's Department of Parks and Recreation staff.

The field is currently home to the Capital City Islanders as of 2025.

=== Proposed Stadium Renovation ===
In 2015, the Harrisburg City Islanders began applying for grant funding to facilitate upgrades to the existing complex. The proposed upgrades were anticipated to include increasing capacity to 5,000 seats, new premium spaces, a new entrance plaza, new concessions and restrooms, improved indoor locker rooms, a modern broadcasting booth, and a new scoreboard.

New seating was intended to be an upgrade from existing bleachers with a mix of individual bucket seats, ten suites, a VIP deck with seating, and bleacher seats with back supports.

These proposed stadium renovations ultimately never materialized.
