= Bilal Duckett =

American soccer player

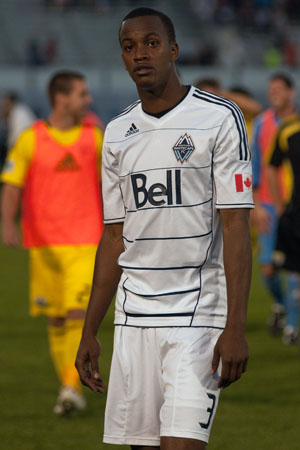

Personal information
- Full name: Kevin Bilal Duckett
- Date of birth: January 9, 1989 (age 37)
- Place of birth: Macon, Georgia, United States
- Height: 6 ft 2 in (1.88 m)
- Position: Defender

Youth career
- 2007–2010: Notre Dame Fighting Irish

Senior career*
Years	Team	Apps	(Gls)
2008	Atlanta Silverbacks U23's	3	(0)
2009	Indiana Invaders	5	(1)
2011	Vancouver Whitecaps FC	4	(0)
2011	→ Vancouver Whitecaps FC U-23 (loan)	1	(0)
2012	Harrisburg City Islanders	19	(1)
2013	New England Revolution	1	(0)
2013	→ Rochester Rhinos (loan)	20	(1)
2014	Charlotte Eagles	27	(0)
2015	Sacramento Republic	0	(0)
2015–2018	Charlotte Independence	109	(3)
- * Club domestic league appearances and goals as of 09:42, 15 October 2018 (UTC)

Kevin Bilal Duckett (born January 9, 1989) is an American soccer player.

== Career ==
=== College and amateur ===
Duckett played youth soccer in Georgia and played for McIntosh High School where he captained the squad to a state title in his senior season. Duckett joined the Notre Dame Fighting Irish in 2007 and was the starting right back during his last two years with the school.

=== Professional ===
Duckett was drafted first in the third round (37th overall) in the 2011 MLS SuperDraft by Vancouver Whitecaps FC. His versatility impressed coach Teitur Thordarson, who used Duckett, a natural right back, at center back and left back during the 2011 pre-season. The club signed Duckett on March 15, 2011, and he made his professional debut on June 1 in a game against Chivas USA.

Duckett was waived by Vancouver on November 23, 2011.

Duckett signed with USL Pro team Harrisburg City Islanders on March 27, 2012.

Duckett signed with the MLS team New England Revolution on February 11, 2013.

On February 20, 2014, Duckett signed with USL Pro club Charlotte Eagles.

After the Eagles moved to the USL PDL, Duckett signed with USL side Sacramento Republic, before again moving to Charlotte Independence soon after on April 10, 2015. Duckett left Charlotte after their 2018 season.
