= Morgan Langley (soccer) =

American soccer player

Personal information
- Date of birth: June 9, 1989 (age 37)
- Place of birth: Honolulu, Hawaii, United States
- Height: 1.78 m (5 ft 10 in)
- Positions: Attacking midfielder; winger

Youth career
- 2007–2010: Swarthmore Garnet

Senior career*
Years	Team	Apps	(Gls)
2011	Harrisburg City Islanders	20	(2)
2011	Philadelphia Union	1	(0)
2012–2014	Harrisburg City Islanders	70	(14)
2015	St Patrick's Athletic	18	(3)
- * Club domestic league appearances and goals as of 31 December 2016

Morgan Langley (born June 9, 1989) is an American former professional soccer player who last played for St Patrick's Athletic.

== Career ==
=== College and amateur ===
Langley attended ʻIolani School and played four years of college soccer at Swarthmore College. He is Swarthmore's all-time program leader in career points and assists. As a junior in 2009, he was named to the Centennial Conference first team and was a NSCAA Mid-Atlantic All-Region second team selection, while as a senior in 2010, he was an NSCAA/NCAA All-American, an NSCAA Mideast All-Region selection, and was named to the Centennial Conference first team.

In his final season at Swarthmore, Langley produced one of the best offensive seasons in the school's history, leading the team with 14 goals, 14 assists and a program single-season record 42 points.

=== Professional ===
Langley signed his first professional contract in 2011 when he signed with the Harrisburg City Islanders of the USL Professional Division. He made his professional debut on April 23 in a 1–0 loss to the Pittsburgh Riverhounds, and scored his first professional goal on May 31, in a 4–2 win, again against the Riverhounds.

After the end of the 2011 USL Pro season, Langley trialed with Philadelphia Union of Major League Soccer before signing with the MLS club on September 15, 2011. On January 19, 2012, Philadelphia declined his 2012 contract option and Langley was released.

Langley re-signed with his former club Harrisburg City Islanders on February 25, 2012. He stayed there until the end of the 2014 season.

=== Move to Europe ===
On March 10, 2015, Langley signed for Dublin based League of Ireland side, St Patrick's Athletic for the 2015 season, becoming the first American to sign for the club since Ryan Guy. He was given the number 8 jersey for the Saints, previously worn by former Ireland international Keith Fahey, who had controversially moved to Pats' main rivals Shamrock Rovers in pre-season. Langley made his Pats debut against Derry City at Richmond Park on the 24th March, coming on as a half time substitute and he scored a debut goal when he headed in a Conan Byrne free kick in the 82nd minute to secure a 2–0 win for the Saints.

In 2016, Langley announced his retirement from professional soccer.

== Career statistics ==
=== Club ===
Competitive games only.

Club	Season	League			National Cup		League Cup		Continental		Other		Total	
Club	Season	Division	Apps	Goals	Apps	Goals	Apps	Goals	Apps	Goals	Apps	Goals	Apps	Goals
Harrisburg City Islanders	2011	USL Pro	20	2	1	0	—		—		—		21	2
Philadelphia Union	2011	Major League Soccer	1	0	0	0	—		—		—		1	0
Harrisburg City Islanders	2012	USL Pro	19	3	3	1	—		—		—		22	4
Harrisburg City Islanders	2013	USL Pro	23	4	0	0	—		—		—		23	4
Harrisburg City Islanders	2014	USL Pro	28	7	2	2	—		—		—		30	9
Harrisburg City Islanders	Harrisburg City Islanders total		90	16	6	3	—		—		—		97	19
St Patrick's Athletic	2015	League of Ireland Premier Division	18	3	2	0	4	0	1 (Note: Appearances in Europa League)	0	2 (Note: Appearances in Leinster Senior Cup)	2	27	5
Career total			109	19	8	3	4	0	1	0	2	2	124	24

== Honors ==
- League of Ireland Cup (1): 2015
