= Christopher Agorsor =

American soccer player

Chris Agorsor
Personal information
- Full name: Christopher Agorsor
- Date of birth: September 1, 1990 (age 36)
- Place of birth: Severn, Maryland, United States
- Height: 5 ft 9 in (1.75 m)
- Position: Forward

Youth career
- 2007–2008: Baltimore Bays Chelsea

College career
Years	Team	Apps	(Gls)
2008–2009	Virginia Cavaliers		

Senior career*
Years	Team	Apps	(Gls)
2011	Philadelphia Union	0	(0)
2011	Real Salt Lake	1	(0)
2012	Richmond Kickers	21	(6)

International career^{‡}
2007	United States U18	3	(0)
- * Club domestic league appearances and goals as of August 9, 2012 ‡ National team caps and goals as of March 20, 2013

Christopher Agorsor (born September 1, 1990, in Severn, Maryland) is a former professional American soccer player. After playing he started a private investment company based in Washington D.C.

== Career ==
=== Youth and college ===
In high school, he scored 24 goals with eight assists in 15 matches in his junior season, helping his high school team to a Top 5 national ranking in the fall. He was named the Baltimore Sun Player of the Year despite missing nearly 10 matches, and also won Gatorade Player of The Year. Agorsor played college soccer at the University of Virginia but, after a promising start to his college career, suffered a serious knee injury in 2008. Agorsor recovered from this injury and returned to University of Virginia for his sophomore year. Before joining Major League Soccer (MLS), he spent some time training with Man United and Nacional in Portugal. He also spent the time before his lottery into MLS training with the Philadelphia Union.

=== Professional ===
In February 2011, Agorsor signed a contract with Major League Soccer and was allocated to the Philadelphia Union via a weighted lottery on February 14, 2011. Agorsor was waived by the team in June, before making any appearances with the first team.

After his release from Philadelphia, Agorsor went on trial with Real Salt Lake during June and July 2011. Agorsor signed with Salt Lake on July 20, 2011. He made his professional debut on October 6, 2011, during a 3–0 defeat against Vancouver Whitecaps FC.

Real Salt Lake released Agorsor on February 10, 2012, and he most recently played for the Richmond Kickers of USL Pro.

=== Personal ===
Agorsor was eligible to play for the US National Team as well as the national team of Ghana.
