= Nelson Becerra =

Peruvian footballer (born 1987)

Personal information
- Full name: Nelson David Becerra
- Date of birth: 20 July 1987 (age 39)
- Place of birth: Lima, Peru
- Height: 5 ft 10 in (1.78 m)
- Position: Midfielder

Youth career
- 2006: Centenary College Cyclones
- 2007–2009: St. John's Red Storm

Senior career*
Years	Team	Apps	(Gls)
2008	Long Island Rough Riders	10	(3)
2010	Central Jersey Spartans	9	(0)
2011	Harrisburg City Islanders	15	(3)
2012–2013	Icon FC	20	(7)
2013	Wigry Suwałki	6	(0)
2014–2017	Jersey Express		
2018	FC Motown	25	(6)
- * Club domestic league appearances and goals

Nelson David Becerra (born 20 July 1987) is a Peruvian former professional footballer who played as a midfielder.

== Career ==
=== College and amateur ===
Becerra grew up in Paterson, New Jersey, and attended Saint Benedict's Preparatory School, where he was a teammate of fellow professional José Angulo. He began his college soccer at Centenary College of New Jersey, where he earned NSCAA second team Metro Region accolades, Skyline Conference first team honors, and was named Skyline Conference Rookie of the Year. He transferred to St. John's University prior to his sophomore season. In 2008, Becerra earned NSCAA All-Northeast Region third team honors; he was also named the Midfielder of the Year for the Big East conference and was part of the All-BIG EAST first team as a junior. He helped lead the Red Storm to their first College Cup appearance since 2003, earning himself an invitation to the 2010 MLS Combine.

During his college years, Becerra also played in the USL Premier Development League for the Long Island Rough Riders and the Central Jersey Spartans. He scored three goals in 10 games with the Long Island Rough Riders in 2008. With the Spartans in 2010, he bagged eight assists in only nine games.

=== Professional ===
Having attended the MLS combine in 2010, Becerra signed his first professional contract in 2011 when he signed with the Harrisburg City Islanders of the USL Professional Division. He made his professional debut on April 23 in a 1–0 loss to the Pittsburgh Riverhounds, and scored his first professional goal on May 14 in a 1–1 tie with the Richmond Kickers.
