= Mark Wiltse =

American soccer player (born 1988)

Personal information
- Full name: Mark Wiltse
- Date of birth: May 29, 1988 (age 38)
- Place of birth: Fairfax, Virginia, United States
- Height: 6 ft 0 in (1.83 m)
- Positions: Defender; midfielder

Youth career
- 2002–2006: Players Development Academy
- 2003: IMG Soccer Academy
- 2006–2010: South Carolina Gamecocks

Senior career*
Years	Team	Apps	(Gls)
2010	Central Jersey Spartans	14	(0)
2011–2013	Charleston Battery	50	(0)

International career^{‡}
2003	United States U17	1	(0)
- * Club domestic league appearances and goals as of June 3, 2012 ‡ National team caps and goals as of July 17, 2012

Mark Wiltse (born May 29, 1988) is a former American soccer player, best known for his days with the Charleston Battery of the USL Professional Division.

== Career ==
=== College and amateur ===
Wiltse attended Montgomery High School played four years of college soccer at the University of South Carolina, where he studied management and marketing. He was named to the Conference USA All-Freshman Team after his debut year in 2006, was selected to the All-Conference USA Third Team, the adidas Gamecock Classic All-Tournament Team and the Conference USA All-Tournament Team after his sophomore year in 2007, and was named team co-captain in 2008, before suffering a season-ending leg injury in the first game of his senior season in 2009.

During his college years Wiltse also played for the Central Jersey Spartans in the USL Premier Development League.

=== Professional ===
Undrafted out of college, Wiltse signed with Charleston Battery of the USL Pro league on March 29, 2011, and made his professional debut on April 9 in a game against the Charlotte Eagles. On January 10, 2014, Wiltse officially declared his retirement.
