= Stephen Basso =

American soccer player (born 1987)

Personal information
- Full name: Stephen Alexander Basso
- Date of birth: August 22, 1987 (age 39)
- Place of birth: San José, Costa Rica
- Height: 6 ft 0 in (1.83 m)
- Positions: Defender; midfielder

Team information
- Current team: Harrisburg Heat (indoor)

Youth career
- 2004–2005: D.C. United

Senior career*
Years	Team	Apps	(Gls)
2003	PSV Blau Gelb		
2007–2008	SV Darmstadt 98	0	(0)
2008	Real Maryland Monarchs	17	(0)
2009–2010	Crystal Palace Baltimore	24	(0)
2011–2013	Harrisburg City Islanders	75	(2)
2012–2014	Rochester Lancers (indoor)	46	(15)
2014	Richmond Kickers	3	(0)
2014	Evergreen Diplomats	8	(0)
2014	Ontario Fury (indoor)	7	(5)
2014–2015	Rochester Lancers (indoor)	15	(3)
2015	Richmond Kickers	0	(0)
2015–2016	Ontario Fury (indoor)	19	(11)
2016–2019	Harrisburg Heat (indoor)	29	(9)
2021–	Harrisburg Heat (indoor)	5	(0)

International career
- United States arena soccer

Managerial career
- 2019–: Wake FC Women
- * Club domestic league appearances and goals as of 14 November 2011

Stephen Basso (born August 22, 1987) is a Costa Rican-born American soccer player. Basso currently plays for the Harrisburg Heat in the Major Arena Soccer League, as well as serving as the head coach for Wake FC in the Women's Premier Soccer League.

== Career ==
=== Youth and amateur ===
Basso started playing soccer at age 5 in New Delhi, India where his father, a foreign service officer with the State Department, worked. Basso eventually settled in Columbia, Maryland, where he played on Soccer Association of Columbia/Howard County teams and high school soccer at Hammond High School, but did not attended college; instead, he left high school early and went to Germany when his father was assigned to Frankfurt. Basso signed for German lower-league side PSV Blau Gelb in 2003.

Basso spent a year with Blau Geld, before returning to the United States to join the youth academy of Major League Soccer side D.C. United, foregoing college soccer, Basso spent two years there, helping his team to the U17 National Championship Semi-Finals in 2004 and the U19 National Championship Semi-Finals in 2005.

=== Professional ===
Having not been offered a professional contract by DC, Basso initially returned to Germany, signing his first professional contract for SV Darmstadt 98. Basso spent the majority of his time in Darmstadt playing for team's reserves, never making a first team appearance, and returned to the United States in 2008 to sign for USL Second Division expansion franchise Real Maryland Monarchs. He made his professional debut on April 20, 2008 in Maryland's season opening 1-0 loss to the Western Mass Pioneers.

Basso signed for Crystal Palace Baltimore in 2009. On March 16, 2010 Baltimore announced the re-signing of Basso to a new contract for the 2010 season. He went on to make 24 league appearances for CPB over two seasons before leaving the club when it ceased operations at the end of 2010.

Basso signed with Harrisburg City Islanders of the USL Pro league on April 1, 2011. He scored his first professional goal in his fifth pro year, on May 22, 2011 in a 3-1 loss to Orlando City. Harrisburg City re-signed Basso in February 2012.
