= J. T. Noone =

American soccer player (born 1988)

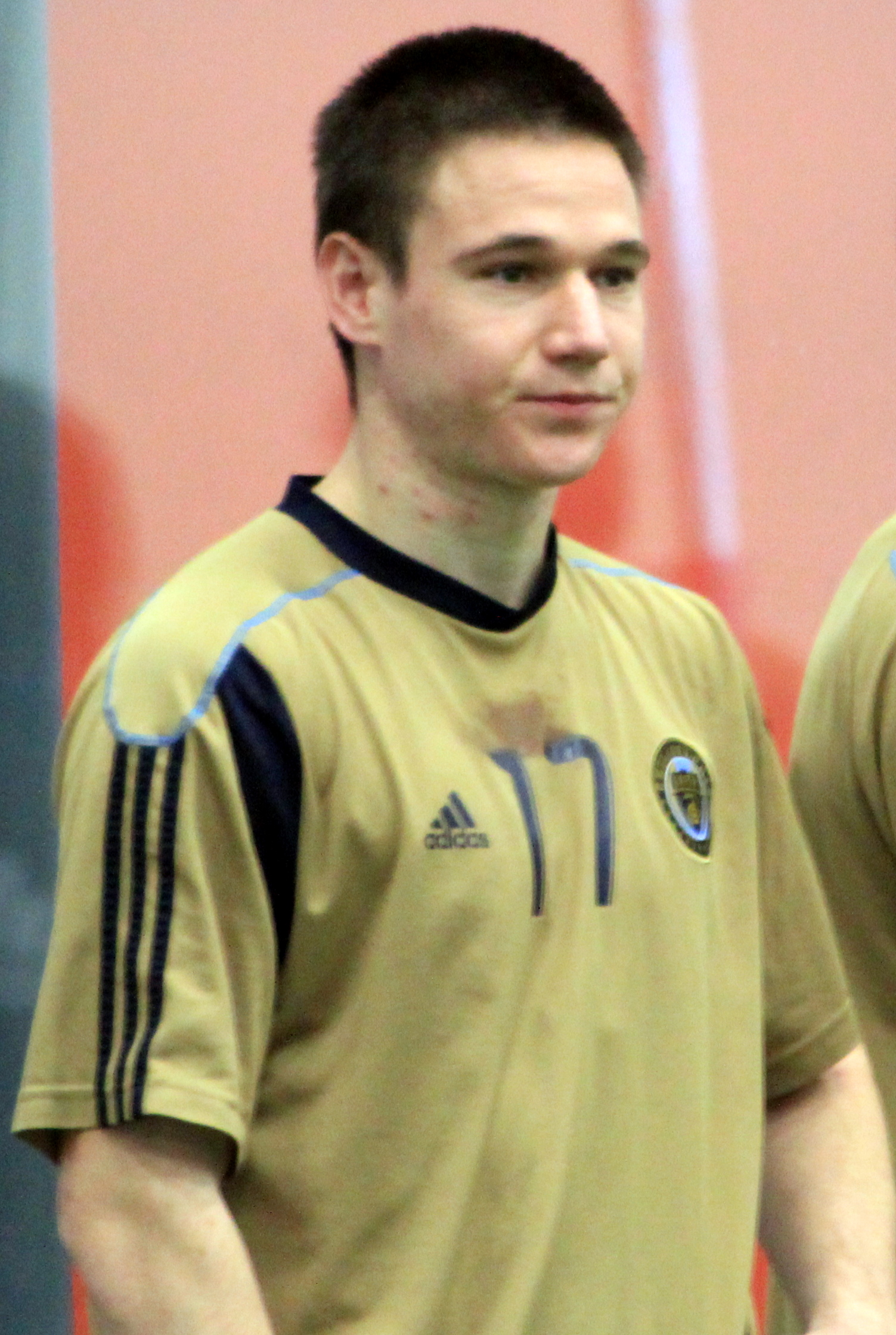
- Noone at 2011 preseason training with the Union

Personal information
- Full name: Joseph Noone
- Date of birth: July 17, 1988 (age 38)
- Place of birth: Harrisburg, Pennsylvania, United States
- Height: 6 ft 1 in (1.85 m)
- Position: Midfielder

College career
Years	Team	Apps	(Gls)
2006–2009	Temple Owls		

Senior career*
Years	Team	Apps	(Gls)
2009	Ocean City Barons	16	(3)
2010	Harrisburg City Islanders	15	(0)
2010	Philadelphia Union	0	(0)
2011–2012	Harrisburg City Islanders	43	(2)
2011–2014	Baltimore Blast (indoor)	70	(26)
2013	VSI Tampa Bay FC	17	(1)
- * Club domestic league appearances and goals as of February 14, 2014

Joseph "J. T." Noone (born July 17, 1988, in Harrisburg, Pennsylvania) is an American soccer player currently playing for the Baltimore Blast in the Major Indoor Soccer League.

== Career ==
=== College and amateur ===
Noone attended Central Dauphin High School, where he was a second team all-league and Mid-Penn honorable mention selection, played club soccer for Super Nova, who he helped win the 2002 EPYSA Indoor State Cup, and played for Harrisburg rival Coventry where he helped win the 2000 EPYSA Indoor State Cup prior to joining Super Nova, and was a member of his regional Olympic Development Programme in 2003 and 2004, before going on to play college soccer at Temple University.

With the Owls Noone named to the ESPN Magazine Men's Soccer Academic All-District 2 University Division Second Team as a sophomore, and became the first Owl in 22 years to earn All-America honors with his selection to the NSCAA Second Team All-America squad in 2008. As a junior, he was also an NSCAA First Team All-Atlantic Region selection.

Prior to his senior year at Temple, Noone played with the Ocean City Barons of the Premier Development League. Noone played in 16 regular season games for Ocean City in 2009 season, scoring three goals and adding three assists. He also played in three Lamar Hunt US Open Cup matches. He scored a goal in a 3-0 first round upset of Crystal Palace Baltimore of the USL Second Division and scored the game-winning penalty kick in overtime in a 1–0 upset of USL-2's Real Maryland Monarchs. He would start and play 90 minutes in the club's 2–0 loss at D.C. United of Major League Soccer in round 3. He also helped the Barons reach the quarterfinals of the PDL playoffs, and scored the tying goal in a 2-1 second round win over the previously unbeaten Ottawa Fury.

=== Professional ===
After trialing with Major League Soccer club Philadelphia Union during 2010's pre-season, Noone turned professional in 2010 when he joined home-town club, Harrisburg City Islanders in the USL Second Division (a Philadelphia Union affiliate club). He made his professional debut on May 7, 2010, in a game against the Charlotte Eagles, and went on to play 15 games for the Islanders in his debut pro season.

On July 30, 2010, Noone was signed by Philadelphia Union. He was waived by the club on March 1, 2011, without having made an MLS appearance, and returned to play for Harrisburg in the USL Professional Division in 2011.

He is currently represented by Matt Russell out of Brooklyn, NY.

JT is a former member of the Norwood residence.
