= Jason Pelletier =

American soccer player

Personal information
- Full name: Jason Pelletier
- Date of birth: April 24, 1985 (age 41)
- Place of birth: Middletown, Pennsylvania, U.S.
- Height: 5 ft 10 in (1.78 m)
- Position: Defensive midfielder

College career
Years	Team	Apps	(Gls)
2004–2007	Rutgers Scarlet Knights		

Senior career*
Years	Team	Apps	(Gls)
2008–2014	Harrisburg City Islanders	141	(5)
- * Club domestic league appearances and goals as of June 30, 2015

Jason Pelletier (born April 24, 1985) is an American retired soccer player who last played for Harrisburg City Islanders in the United Soccer League.

== Career ==
=== College ===
Pelletier attended Middletown Area High School and played college soccer at Rutgers University and Robert Morris University. He was a staple in the central midfield for the Colonials, earning All-NEC selections in 2005 and 2006. He was also a Regional and National Olympic Development Program participant.

=== Professional ===
Pelletier turned professional in 2008 when he signed with the Harrisburg City Islanders of the USL Second Division and made his professional debut on April 26, 2008, in Harrisburg's 1-1 opening day tie with the Cleveland City Stars. He scored his first professional goal on May 3, 2008, in a 1–1 tie with the Pittsburgh Riverhounds. On February 2, 2010, Harrisburg City announced the re-signing of Pelletier for the 2010 season.

In February 2015, Pelletier announced his retirement from professional soccer prior to the 2015 season having made 141 appearances and scored 8 goals for the City Islanders.

== Music career ==
Pelletier is currently in a production group with long-time friend and fellow producer Jason Miller. The duo are known as Goldman Stacks and Beat Street Productions, amongst others. The team's studio, known as the dojo, is located in the Oak Hills projects of Middletown, PA.
