= Sainey Touray =

Gambian footballer

Personal information
- Full name: Sainey Touray
- Date of birth: February 8, 1990 (age 36)
- Place of birth: Serrekunda, Gambia
- Height: 6 ft 1 in (1.85 m)
- Position: Forward

Senior career*
Years	Team	Apps	(Gls)
2003–2005	Tallinding United	14	(10)
2005–2008	Wallidan	38	(21)
2008	New York Red Bulls	0	(0)
2009–2010	Wallidan	11	(6)
2010	Carolina RailHawks	0	(0)
2010	→ Harrisburg City Islanders (loan)	1	(1)
2011–2013	Harrisburg City Islanders	61	(20)
2013–2014	San Antonio Scorpions	17	(5)
2015	Austin Aztex	18	(3)

International career
- Gambia U20
- * Club domestic league appearances and goals as of October 4, 2015

Sainey "Ballack" Touray (born February 8, 1990, in Serrekunda) is a Gambian footballer who last played for Austin Aztex.

== Career ==
=== Club ===
Touray began his professional career with Tallinding United of the Gambian Second Division, where he was the league's youngest forward after joining the team in 2003. In 2005, he moved to First Division side Wallidan, and became one of the club's key players, leading the club to the 2008 Gambian title as the club's top scorer with nine goals.

His play at Wallidan and with various Gambian youth national teams sparked the interest of several European clubs, leading to him training in 2007 with Arsenal of the English Premier League. At the conclusion of the 2008 Gambian First Division, Touray went on trial with New York Red Bulls and was eventually signed in August 2008. He appeared in six matches with the Red Bull Reserves and scored two goals.

On March 25, 2010, on the strength of an impressive pre-season, American second-tier club Carolina RailHawks signed Touray for their 2010 USSFD2 campaign. During 2010 he also spent a period on loan at Harrisburg City Islanders of the USL Second Division.

Touray made 21 appearances for the City Islanders in 2011, his first full season with the club. He bagged seven goals and six assists last season, finishing second on the team with 20 points and that helped the City Islanders grab second in the National Division.

Touray, who signed on with the North American Soccer League's San Antonio Scorpions following the 2013 USL PRO season. Touray enjoyed a terrific 2013 campaign with a City Islanders squad ( banking career highs in points (28), (11) Goals and (6)Assist. Touray's productivity in 2013 also landed him USL PRO-first-team, all-league berth.

In three seasons with the City Islanders, the 23-year-old Gambian native registered 58 points on 21 goals and 16 assists. The 6–1, 169-pounder, ranks second on the City Islanders' all-time list in points and goals, and third in assists.

=== International ===
Touray has featured for the Gambian Under-17 and Under-20 international squads. He earned the Golden Boot while leading Gambia's U-17 team that won the Ivorian four-nation Football tournament. Gambia defeated Burkina Faso 1–0 in the final with the lone goal scored by Touray. He made his U-20 debut on March 25, 2007, in a 2–1 loss to Chile at the Suwon International Youth Football Tournament.

== Honors ==
- 2008 Gambian National league D1 Wallidan
- 2008 Gambian Fa Cup Champion D1 Wallidan
- 2014 NASl Championship San Antonio scorpions
