= Andrew Welker =

American soccer player

Personal information
- Date of birth: July 31, 1989 (age 37)
- Place of birth: Mechanicsburg, Pennsylvania, United States
- Height: 5 ft 11 in (1.80 m)
- Positions: Attacking midfielder; forward

Youth career
- 2007–2010: Seton Hall Pirates

Senior career*
Years	Team	Apps	(Gls)
2010	New York Red Bull NPSL		
2011–?	Harrisburg City Islanders	41	(11)
- * Club domestic league appearances and goals as of July 30, 2012

Andrew Welker (born July 31, 1989) is an American soccer player who played for Harrisburg City Islanders in the USL Professional Division.

== Career ==
=== College ===
Welker attended Cumberland Valley High School, was part of the Eastern Pennsylvania olympic development program, and played four years of college soccer at Seton Hall University. He appeared in 64 games in his career for the Pirates, totaling 15 goals and 36 points. He was a Third Team All-BIG EAST and All-District First Team selection as a junior in 2009.

=== Professional ===
After trialing with Major League Soccer's Philadelphia Union in the 2011 MLS preseason. Welker turned professional in 2011 when he signed with Harrisburg City Islanders of the USL Professional Division. He made his professional debut on May 7, 2011, as a substitute in a 1–1 tie with FC New York. Welker was named the USL PRO Player of the Week for Week 16 of the 2011 season after he had a hat trick to lead his side to a 5–1 victory against FC New York on July 20, 2011. Welker has also played games for the Philadelphia Union in the 2011 MLS Reserve Division.
