= Stanley Nyazamba =

Zimbabwean footballer (born 1983)

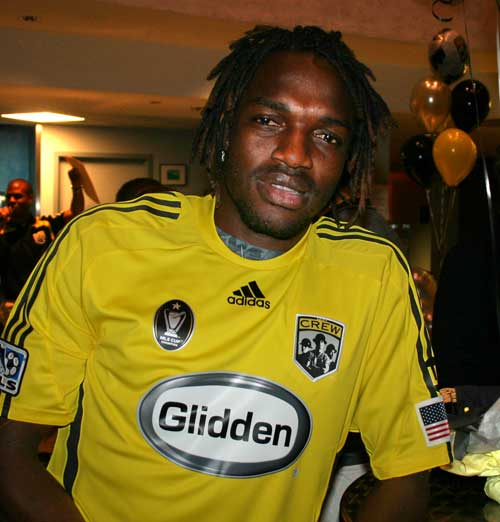
- Nyazamba with Columbus Crew in 2009

Personal information
- Date of birth: January 6, 1983 (age 43)
- Place of birth: Bulawayo, Zimbabwe
- Height: 6 ft 1 in (1.85 m)
- Position: Midfielder

College career
Years	Team	Apps	(Gls)
2004–2007	Lee Flames		(28)

Senior career*
Years	Team	Apps	(Gls)
2007	Cape Cod Crusaders	14	(0)
2008	Richmond Kickers	16	(8)
2008–2009	Columbus Crew	0	(0)
2010	FC Tampa Bay	25	(0)
2011–2013	Richmond Kickers	32	(4)
Total		87	(12)
- * Club domestic league appearances and goals

Stanley Nyazamba (born January 6, 1983) is a Zimbabwean retired footballer.

== Career ==
=== College and amateur ===
Nyazamba moved from his native Zimbabwe to play college soccer at Lee University. He finished his career with 28 goals and 60 assists, becoming the all-time assist leader for Lee, and in his last season he was named to the 2007 All-American First Team, as well as being named a NAIA All-American Scholar Athlete. During his college years Nyazamba also played for the Cape Cod Crusaders of the USL Premier Development League.

=== Professional ===
Nyazamba signed with the Richmond Kickers of the USL Second Division in April 2008. He scored 8 goals in 16 games in his debut season, and was named 2008 USL2 Rookie of the Year.

Nyazamba signed a developmental contract with the Columbus Crew on September 15, 2008, filling the roster spot of the waived Ryan Miller. He made his Black & Gold debut on June 30, 2009, in the Crew's 2009 Lamar Hunt U.S. Open Cup third round match against the Rochester Rhinos, then of the USL First Division. Nyazamba played the full 120 minutes and assisted on the Duncan Oughton goal that sent the match into extra time.

He signed with new USSF Division 2 franchise FC Tampa Bay in March 2010. On February 14, 2011, Nyazamba returned to the Richmond Kickers, signing with the club that had recently moved into the newly formed USL Pro league.

=== Youth coaching ===
Nyazamba has also been a youth soccer coach for over 10 years and was in involved in youth travel teams for Columbus Crew and Richmond Kickers. In 2010, he began preschool coaching with Little Kicks before moving to Atlanta, Georgia in February 2014. There, he founded a soccer program for kids of ages 2 to 8, Kidz 'n' Kicks Soccer Inc.
