= Andrew Marshall (soccer) =

American soccer player

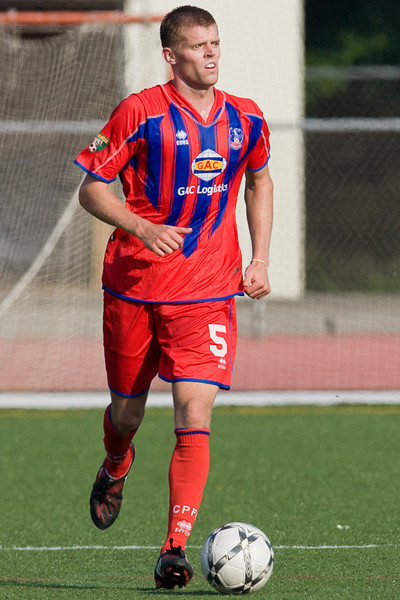

Personal information
- Full name: Andrew Kenneth Marshall
- Date of birth: January 17, 1984 (age 42)
- Place of birth: Winfield, Illinois, United States
- Height: 6 ft 0 in (1.83 m)
- Position: Defender

Youth career
- 2003–2006: Towson Tigers

Senior career*
Years	Team	Apps	(Gls)
2007–2010	Crystal Palace Baltimore	82	(3)
2011–2012	Harrisburg City Islanders	36	(0)
2011–2012	Norfolk SharX (indoor)	19	(1)
2012–2013	Harrisburg Heat (indoor)	15	(8)
2013–2014	Pittsburgh Riverhounds	46	(3)
- * Club domestic league appearances and goals as of May 11, 2020

Andrew Kenneth Marshall (born January 17, 1984) is a former professional American soccer player and current NCAA DI Assistant Soccer Coach for the Duquesne Dukes men's soccer Team.

== Career ==
=== College ===
Marshall grew up in Ellicott City, Maryland and attended Centennial High School. At Centennial he played both soccer and lacrosse, leading his lacrosse team to the 2003 Maryland state championship. He played college soccer at Towson University, where he started all 76 games of his college career. He was named Freshman of the Year in 2003, and captained the team in his senior year to a national ranking of 15th.

=== Professional ===
Marshall turned professional with Crystal Palace Baltimore in the USL Second Division in 2007, and made his professional debut on April 20, 2007, in Baltimore's first ever game, a 4–1 loss to the Charlotte Eagles.

Although he did not score in league play in 2008, Marshall did score a goal in the team's 2–0 upset of Major League Soccer side New York Red Bulls in the third round of the 2008 U.S. Open Cup. On March 16, 2010, Baltimore announced the re-signing of Marshall to a new contract for the 2010 season. On March 11, 2011, the Harrisburg City Islanders announced the signing of Marshall to a contract for the 2011 season. He played in the MISL with the Norfolk Sharx for the 2011-12 indoor season. After two seasons with the City Islanders, Marshall signed with the PASL Harrisburg Heat. March 2013, Marshall signed with the Pittsburgh Riverhounds.

== Career statistics ==
(correct as of 19 September 2010)

Club	Season	League			Cup			Play-Offs			Total		
Club	Season	Apps	Goals	Assists	Apps	Goals	Assists	Apps	Goals	Assists	Apps	Goals	Assists
Crystal Palace Baltimore	2007	19	1	2	1	0	0	-	-	-	20	1	2
Crystal Palace Baltimore	2008	20	0	1	4	1	1	2	0	0	26	1	2
Crystal Palace Baltimore	2009	19	0	1	1	0	0	-	-	-	20	0	1
Crystal Palace Baltimore	2010	24	2	1	0	0	0	-	-	-	24	2	1
Harrisburg City Islanders	2011	15	-	-	0	0	0	2	0	0	17	-	-
Norfolk Sharx (MISL)	2011-12	19	1	2	-	-	-	-	-	-	19	1	2
Harrisburg City Islanders	2012	21	0	1	4	1	0	1	0	0	26	1	1
Harrisburg Heat (PASL)	2012-13	15	8	3	-	-	-	-	-	-	15	8	3
Pittsburgh Riverhounds	2013–2014	27	2	0	1	-	-	-	-	-	28	2	-
Total	2007–2014	165	12	11	11	2	1	5	0	0	181	14	12

== Honors ==
- USL Pro All-League Second Team: 2013
