= Brian Ombiji =

Kenyan footballer (born 1982)

Personal information
- Full name: Brian Ombiji
- Date of birth: August 17, 1982 (age 44)
- Place of birth: Eldoret, Kenya
- Height: 5 ft 9 in (1.75 m)
- Position: Midfielder

Youth career
- 2002–2005: Lindsey Wilson Blue Raiders

Senior career*
Years	Team	Apps	(Gls)
2001	AFC Leopards		
2004–2005	Michigan Bucks	30	(11)
2007–2008	Harrisburg City Islanders	35	(10)
2010–2012	Harrisburg City Islanders	30	(12)
- * Club domestic league appearances and goals as of June 22, 2012

Brian Ombiji (born August 17, 1982) is a retired Kenyan footballer.

== Career ==
=== College ===
Ombiji attended Mother of Apostles Seminary for high school, and played for Kenyan club AFC Leopards, before moving from his native Kenya to the United States in 2003 to attend and play college soccer at Lindsey Wilson College.

While with the Blue Raiders he earned three All-Conference First Team selections, two NAIA All-Region First Team nods, the NAIA Region XI Player of the Year Award in 2004, and a spot on the NAIA All-Tournament First Team in 2005. In 2004, he was named both the Mid-South Conference and NAIA Region XI Player of the Year, and was an NAIA First Team All-American in 2004 and 2005. He finished his college career having scored 35 goals in 95 games.

During his college years Ombiji also played with the Michigan Bucks in the USL Premier Development League.

=== Professional ===
Ombiji turned professional in 2007 when he joined the Harrisburg City Islanders of the USL pro. He was a major contributor on Harrisburg's 2007 Championship team, scoring 10 goals in his two seasons with the club, recording five game-winning goals, and receiving an All-League Second Team selection in 2007.

After a year away from professional soccer in 2009, Ombiji returned to play with the Islanders again in 2010. He re-signed with Harrisburg for 2011 on April 7, 2011.
