= Horner (surname) =

Horner is an English and German surname that derives from the traditional occupation horner, meaning horn-worker or horn-maker, or even horn-blower.

== People ==
- Albert Horner (1913–2009), Canadian politician
- Alex Kapp Horner (fl. 1994–present), American actress
- Alison Horner (born 1966), British businesswoman
- Andrew Horner (1863–1916), Irish politician
- Anton Horner (1877–1971), American horn player
- Arthur Horner (cartoonist) (1916–1997), Australian cartoonist
- Arthur Horner (trade unionist) (1894–1968), Welsh trade union leader and communist politician
- Ben Horner (born 1989), American soccer player
- Benjamin Bean Horner (1893–1971), American architect and photographer
- Billy Horner (born 1942), English footballer and manager
- Bob Horner (born 1957), American baseball player
- Brigitta Horner (1632–1640), German child witch; see Witchcraft accusations against children
- Charles Horner (disambiguation)
- Charlotte Nichols Saunders Horner (1823–1906), American botanist
- Chris Horner (born 1971), American bicyclist
- Christian Horner (born 1973), Former team principal of the Red Bull Racing Formula One team
- Christopher C. Horner, American attorney and author
- Chuck Horner (born 1936), retired United States Air Force four-star general
- Constance Horner (born 1942), American public official and businesswoman
- Craig Horner (born 1983), Australian actor
- Cynthia Horner, American writer and magazine editor
- David Horner (born 1948), Australian military historian
- Dennis Horner (born 1988), American basketball player
- Dennis Horner (rugby league) (died 1978), English rugby league footballer
- Doug Horner (born 1961), Canadian former politician
- Florence Sally Horner (1937–1952), American girl abducted by a serial child molester, possibly the inspiration for the Vladimir Nabokov character Lolita
- Frances Horner (1854–1940), British hostess and patron of the arts
- Francis Horner (1778–1817), Scottish politician and economist
- Frederick William Horner (1854–?), British playwright, publisher and politician
- George Horner (disambiguation)
- Geri Horner (born 1972), British singer
- Henry Horner (1879–1940), American politician, Governor of Illinois
- Hermann Horner (1892–probably in 1942), Austrian-Hungarian operatic bass-baritone
- Jack Horner (disambiguation)
- James Horner (1953–2015), American film composer
- Jocelyn Horner (1902–1973), English sculptor
- Johan Hörner (1711–1763), Swedish-born Danish painter
- Johann Caspar Horner (1774–1834), Swiss physicist and astronomer
- Johann Friedrich Horner (1831–1886), Swiss ophthalmologist
- John Horner (disambiguation)
- Junius Horner (1859–1933), American Episcopal bishop
- Lindsey Horner (born 1960), American jazz double-bassist
- Leonard Horner (1785–1864), Scottish merchant, geologist and educational reformer
- Marguerite Horner, British artist
- Mark Horner (born 1956), Northern Irish barrister and judge, a Lord Justice of Appeal for Northern Ireland
- Matthew C. Horner (1901–1972), U.S. Marine Corps major general
- Matina Horner (born 1939), American psychologist
- Maxine Horner (1933–2021), American politician, one of the first African American women to serve in the Oklahoma Senate
- Michael Horner (sport shooter) (born 1928), Kenyan Olympic shooter
- Mike Horner (politician) (born 1968), American politician
- Mitchell Horner (born 1994), American politician
- Nate Horner (born 1980/1981), Canadian politician
- Norman Gerald Horner (1882–1954), English physician and medical editor
- Norval Horner (1930–2014), Canadian politician
- Paul Horner (1978–2017), American writer, comedian and contributor to fake news websites
- Penelope Horner (born 1939), British actress
- Phil Horner (born 1966), English footballer
- Red Horner (1909–2005), Canadian ice hockey player
- Robert Horner (cricketer) (born 1967), English cricketer
- Robert Horner (politician) (1932–2008), Canadian politician
- Robert J. Horner (1894–1942), American film producer
- Sally Horner (1937–1952), American formerly missing girl
- Sam Horner (born 1938), American former National Football League player
- Silke Hörner (born 1965), East German former swimmer
- Stephanie Horner (born 1989), Canadian swimmer
- Tanner Lynn Horner, American convicted child murderer
- Thomas Strangways Horner, English MP for Somerset in 1713 and 1727
- Thomas Hornor (surveyor) (1785–1844), English land surveyor, artist and inventor
- Tim Horner (born 1959), American former professional wrestler
- Vicky Horner (born 1976), English former swimmer
- Violet Horner (1892–1970), American silent film actress
- William George Horner (1786–1837), British mathematician
- William Horner (cricketer) (1830–1905), English cricketer
- Yvette Horner (1922–2018), French accordionist

== See also ==
- General Horner (disambiguation)
- Senator Horner (disambiguation)
