= History of Pittsburgh Riverhounds SC =

American soccer club history

Pittsburgh Riverhounds SC is an American professional soccer team based in Pittsburgh, Pennsylvania. Founded in 1998 and beginning play in 1999.

Inaugural Season Timeline
March 11, 1998	USISL Commissioner Francisco Marcos awarded a Professional A-League Soccer Franchise to Alliance Soccer Resources, Inc., the first professional soccer team in Pittsburgh in 30 years.
March 16, 1998	Club hired Dave Kasper as its first general manager.
April 6, 1998	Kasper announced the "Name the Team" contest.
June 15, 1998	Kasper announced that the team would be named Pittsburgh Riverdogs, with Mike Giegel submitting the winning name.
July 6, 1998	Christina Heasley was hired as first director of community relations.
July 16, 1998	Kasper announced the first summer soccer camps under the Pittsburgh Riverdogs name.
July 24, 1998	Robert R. Derda, Jr. was hired as first director of marketing.
July 27, 1998	Club announced its first official office site at 2301 East Carson Street, Pittsburgh, PA 15203.
August 14–21, 1998	Club held its first official summer soccer camps, in Bethel Park, Upper St. Clair, and Moon Township.
September 1998	Club released its first official website.
September 21, 1998	John Phillips was hired as first director of media/public relations.
October 5, 1998	Paul Child was hired as first director of youth development.
October 12, 1998	Terri Young was hired as first sponsorship sales account executive.

Inaugural Season Timeline Cont'd
November 5, 1998	John Kowalski was announced as the first head coach for the team. Paul Child was named as first assistant coach.
December 1, 1998	Jim Pappas was hired as corporate ticket sales account executive/box office manager. Mark Wassilchalk was hired as team operations coordinator.
December 3, 1998	The club announced that they would now be known as the Pittsburgh Riverhounds and unveiled new Riverhounds website.
January 6, 1999	Riverhounds formally announced Bethel Park Stadium as their home for their 1999 season.
January 20, 1999	Quaker Valley coach Gene Klein was hired as the goalkeeper coach.
February 2, 1999	Club took Pittsburgh native Justin Evans in expansion draft as first-ever player.
February 24, 1999	Club signed its first three players: Evans, Steve Bell, and Gary DePalma.
April 12, 1999	The Riverhounds signed free agent forward David Flavius who later became club's all-time leader in goals, assists, and appearances.
May 1, 1999	The Riverhounds played their inaugural game at Bethel Park Stadium in front of a sellout crowd. Emil Haitonic scored the first goal in team history while Justin Evans recorded the first Riverhounds assist.
May 8, 1999	Club won its first league match while goalkeeper Randy Dedini recorded the first shutout.
August 1, 1999	Phil Karn scored first hat trick in team history.
September 11, 1999	Riverhounds won their first playoff match away at Long Island Rough Riders
September 28, 1999	Team's inaugural season came to an end with a defeat in the second round of the playoffs.

== Club history ==
=== Founding ===
The Riverhounds were founded by Paul Heasley, chief executive of Pittsburgh-based Alliance International Ltd., a merchant banking and investment firm, in 1998 as a member of the USL A-League. Pittsburgh was awarded the then-unnamed club on March 11, 1998, with the announcement coming from then USISL commissioner Francisco Marcos. The franchise was awarded to Heasley and his ownership group known as Alliance Soccer Resources, Inc. and became the first professional team in Pittsburgh in 30 years. Heasley, based in Belle Vernon, Pennsylvania, wanted to create role models and a pathway to a professional career for local talent. The club's name was initially announced as the Pittsburgh Riverdogs after a naming committee of five local businessmen with an interest in soccer was established to name the club in 1998. The "Riverdogs" name was suggested by Mike Geigel, a member of the committee. Other names that were considered were the Pittsburgh Pulse and Pittsburgh Power. In December 1998, before the "Riverdogs" ever played a match under that moniker, the name was changed to the Riverhounds after the Charleston RiverDogs, a minor league baseball team in South Carolina, threatened legal action against the club.

The club initially played their home games in Bethel Park, at Bethel Park High School's football stadium. John Kowalski was named the first head coach of the club and Justin Evans, a local Peters Township native, was the first player drafted to play for the Riverhounds. Dave Kasper, another Pittsburgh native, was named the first vice president and general manager by Heasley in 1998, a position that he held for the club's first two seasons before taking up executive positions with the New England Revolution and D.C. United. Heasley and Kasper initially worked out of a small office in Pittsburgh's South Side. In their inaugural season, the Riverhounds advanced to the conference semi-finals in the A-league playoffs after finishing the regular season with a 16–12 record. Following the season, the Riverhounds were named the A-League Organization of the Year. Two years later in 2001, the club achieved its greatest cup success by reaching the U.S. Open Cup quarterfinals after beating the Colorado Rapids of the Major League Soccer and then-A-league opponent El Paso Patriots in their first two games, but the Hounds were eliminated in the quarterfinals by their second MLS opponent of the tournament, the Chicago Fire, in a two-overtime, 3–2 defeat. In 2004, the club moved down to the USL's Second Division. The team also moved to Moon Township to play at Moon Area High School's football stadium for just one season. The 2004 season saw the club also earn its most notable league accomplishment, winning the USL Atlantic Division with a record of 17–2–1. In December 2004, Heasley sold the team to Sports Facility LLC, owners of the Washington Wild Things baseball team of the Frontier League. The Riverhounds played both the 2005 and 2006 seasons at the Wild Things' minor league baseball stadium, Consol Energy Park, on the outskirts of Washington, Pennsylvania, about 30 miles (48 km) south of Pittsburgh. The franchise continued to hold soccer academies and training for youths across the tri-state Area, but went on hiatus and did not play during the 2007 season due to a structural reorganization. During that hiatus, the Riverhounds were sold yet again to a new ownership group. This time, the club was purchased by Greentree Sports-Plex. At the time, Jason Kutney, then Riverhounds defender and future Riverhounds CEO and co-owner, was also CEO of the multi-sport facility. On October 29, 2007, the organization announced another venue change. Beginning with the 2008 season, Chartiers Valley High School's stadium, located just off the Kirwan Heights exit of Interstate 79 in Pittsburgh's South Hills, would be the new home of the Riverhounds. The club played its home matches in the stadium through the 2012 season when its own, permanent soccer-specific stadium was completed. Another significant development just prior to the 2008 season was a partnership that was entered into by the Riverhounds and Everton of the Premier League. As part of the partnership the Riverhounds would implement Everton's youth development program into its own academies. Because of this partnership, the Riverhounds also changed its color scheme from its original red, black, and white palette to predominantly blue with white and black accents, reflecting the colors of Everton.

From its inception in 1998 to 2012, the club was sold at least three times and called four stadiums home until achieving more stability and beginning the process of acquiring its own stadium beginning in 2012.

=== 2012 ===
Months before the opening of the 2012 USL Pro season, despite speculation and previous attempts to build a permanent home for the Riverhounds at other locations, on December 8, 2011, it was revealed that a stadium for the club could be built at Station Square on what was, at the time, the site of the amphitheater close to downtown Pittsburgh as part of a redevelopment of the area. However, at the time there was no timeline set for the proposed redevelopment. Less than a month later on January 10, 2012, an official announcement was made that the construction would begin and that the stadium would be completed by summer 2012, meaning that the club could play at least a portion of its 2012 home schedule at the new stadium. Construction of the stadium was scheduled to begin in late March to early April 2012 and to be completed during summer 2012. However, construction at the site began in August, several months behind schedule, and the stadium's projected opening was scheduled for fall 2012, potentially as soon as late September. The stadium was financed with an estimated $7 million by private investors in addition to several corporate sponsors including Highmark who hold naming rights for the stadium. Thus, the stadium was named Highmark Stadium. Because of the prolonged construction of Highmark Stadium, the Riverhounds played the entirety of their 2012 season at the stadium of Chartiers Valley High School, the stadium in which the club had played since the 2008 season. In April 2012, the Riverhounds signed Matt Kassel, formerly of the New York Red Bulls of Major League Soccer. Following the standout season in which he scored a team-leading six goals, he was named to the USL PRO All-League 2nd Team, the only Pittsburgh player to make the 1st or 2nd team selection. Following his impressive season, Kassel returned to Major League Soccer by signing for the Philadelphia Union for the 2013 season. In 2012, the Riverhounds also experienced a short run in the 2012 U.S. Open Cup as they entered and were eliminated in the 2nd round after losing 0–1 to the Michigan Bucks of the lower division Premier Development League. The club finished the regular season second to last in the league with a record of 4–5–15, only finishing above the Antigua Barracuda and missing out on the playoffs. The club played its final match at Chartiers Valley High School on August 10, 2012.

=== 2013 ===
Prior to the 2013 USL Pro season, Pittsburgh signed several experienced offensive players such as Rob Vincent, Kevin Kerr, and José Angulo. Although several warm-up matches and other non-soccer events were held at Highmark Stadium previously, the first official Riverhounds league match took place on April 13, 2013, against the Harrisburg City Islanders, several months after the anticipated completion date. The Riverhounds went on to lose the opening day match 1–2 in front of a sellout crowd of over 4,000 fans. Newly signed Riverhounds striker José Angulo opened the scoring in the match, thus scoring the first goal in the new stadium's history. In summer 2013, the Riverhounds introduced the Frank B. Fuhrer International Friendly Series, an annual international friendly match pitting the Riverhounds against top clubs from around the world. The series was named after investor and local businessman Frank B. Fuhrer who was also former owner of the Pittsburgh Spirit indoor soccer team. The first edition of the series was held on July 19, 2013, as the Riverhounds fell 1–4 against reigning FA Cup holders Wigan Athletic with José Angulo again scoring the Riverhounds' only goal of the match. On the final matchday of the 2013 regular season, Angulo scored Pittsburgh's only goal in a 1–1 draw with the regular season champion Richmond Kickers. With the goal, Angulo tied Dom Dwyer's goal tally of 15 for the season but was crowned scoring champion on total points, with a total of 34 to 31, after he tallied four assists and Dwyer tallied only one. Angulo's 15 goals tied Dwyer for the all-time single season USL Pro scoring record, which was then broken by Kevin Molino of Orlando City SC the following season. At the end of the season, Angulo was also named USL Pro league MVP. Another single-season league record was set by a Pittsburgh player in 2013 as Matthew Dallman tallied twelve assists for the Riverhounds throughout the season. This was the first time in league history that Riverhounds players led the league in both categories. On June 27, 2013, it was announced that Terry "Tuffy" Shallenberger of Connellsville, Pennsylvania became an investor in the club, a move that would have major significance to the club in the near future. Shallenberger also established a Riverhounds academy in his hometown at that time. After a slow start to the season in which the Riverhounds recorded only two victories in its first ten matches, the club finished the regular season seventh in the league with a 10–8–8 record, qualifying for the playoffs. However, the Riverhounds did not make it out of the first round after suffering a heavy 0–5 defeat to Orlando City on August 24, 2013.

=== 2014 ===
In October following the 2013 season, it was announced that former minority shareholder Tuffy Shallenberger had become the majority owner of both the Riverhounds and Highmark Stadium with 51% ownership, with some of his new shares being purchased from Jason Kutney. The following month, the Riverhounds announced that it was forming the Pittsburgh Riverhounds U23 team which would begin play in the Premier Development League during the 2014 season as part of the club's player development system. Despite, and potentially because of, the Riverhounds organization's rapid growth, the team filed for voluntary Chapter 11 Bankruptcy Reorganization on March 26, 2014, before the start of the 2014 USL Pro season. Riverhounds majority owner Tuffy Shallenberger stated that the voluntary filing was necessary to reorganize and alleviate financial stresses on the club that stemmed from additional spending which was incurred to increase construction speed at Highmark Stadium which was not part of the original $10.6 million budget. Filing for bankruptcy was seen as a necessary measure to keep the organization growing and make the city an attractive potential home for a Major League Soccer team. Additionally, Riverhounds CEO Jason Kutney stated that the restructuring of debt would, "put the company in a position where that (joining MLS) can be considered, we have to right the ship and make sure we have a model that can work long-term" and that, "We want to break free of these shackles that have held this company hostage the last few months and restructure debt to the point that we can fully engage these (growth) models." Shallenberger stated at that time that he would provide interim financing to keep the team and stadium running during bankruptcy and that the schedule and day-to-day operations of the club would be not affected. Despite the bankruptcy, the Riverhounds participated in the 2014 USL Pro season as planned. During the season, the Riverhounds were the official USL Pro affiliate of the Houston Dynamo of Major League Soccer as part of a partnership between the USL Pro and MLS. As part of the affiliation, Houston loaned Brian Ownby, Michael Lisch, Anthony Arena, Bryan Salazar, and Jason Johnson back and forth with the Riverhounds throughout the season. The club also made several high-profile player signings to strengthen the squad throughout the season, including Dutch international Collins John, Ghanaian international Anthony Obodai, and former MLS player and Zimbabwean international Joseph Ngwenya. In May 2014, the club parted ways with head coach Justin Evans, the club's manager for the previous five seasons. Despite high expectations going into the season, the club was winless in its first seven matches and in last place in the league. Riverhounds player and academy coach Nikola Katic was named interim head coach at that time. The club made a playoff push late in the season but were defeated 1–2 by Arizona United on the final matchday, needing a victory to qualify. Ultimately, the club finished the season 11th in the league with 32 points. Although they did not qualify for the playoffs, the Riverhounds experienced a strong U.S. Open Cup run, advancing to the fourth round before losing to the Chicago Fire 1–2 after adverse weather conditions halted the match three minutes into the second half.

=== 2015 ===
On November 7, 2014, it was announced that the Riverhounds had emerged from voluntary bankruptcy. The club's plan moving forward called for seeking additional sponsorship opportunities so that the club and Highmark Stadium would be profitable within three years. It was also announced at that time that Jason Kutney would be kept on as the club's CEO and that Nikola Katic would be retained as an assistant coach after having finished the 2014 season as the club's interim head coach. The club began its search for a new head coach and an experienced club president. On December 17, 2014, the Riverhounds met both objectives by hiring championship-winning, longtime Charlotte Eagles head coach Mark Steffens as head coach and Englishman Richard Nightingale, a former executive at Nike, Inc., as president of both the Riverhounds and Highmark Stadium. Allegheny Health Network was then unveiled as the club's new jersey sponsor, replacing #1 Cochran Automotive. Some of Steffen's first changes included signing several former Charlotte Eagles players such as Drew Russell and Fejiro Okiomah, in addition to naming Josh Rife, another of Steffens' former players, as a second assistant coach and head coach of Pittsburgh Riverhounds U23. International players such as South African Lebogang Moloto, Brazilian Vini Dantas, Haitian Max Touloute, Jamaican Ryan Thompson, and Canadian Tyler Pasher were signed to the heavily revamped roster while Colombian José Angulo, 2013 league MVP, former record-holding goalscorer, and the Riverhounds' top scorer the previous two seasons, left the club and signed with the Fort Lauderdale Strikers of the North American Soccer League. Another of Nightingale's first orders of business was dissolving the affiliation with the Houston Dynamo of Major League Soccer which was entered into the previous season, stating that the club preferred to remain without an MLS affiliate to have more autonomy and freedom with their own roster. However, former Dynamo loanee Anthony Arena returned to the club by signing outright with Pittsburgh after being released by the Dynamo at the end of the 2014 MLS season. The Riverhounds finished the 2015 preseason undefeated, getting results of four wins and one draw in five matches. The club continued its impressive performances into the regular season, earning a 5–2 opening day victory over the Harrisburg City Islanders on March 28, 2015. In the match Rob Vincent and Kevin Kerr led the Pittsburgh offense with a brace and a hat-trick, respectively. The match marked the first time that the team had ever scored five goals in a single match at Highmark Stadium. Over the next five matches, the club went 1–2–2 and were winless on the road despite being the highest scoring team in the Eastern Conference and Rob Vincent leading the league in both goals and points at that point of the season. The club's performances were inconsistent to that point, alternating between low-scoring draws or losses and offensive outbursts. The midfield pairing of Rob Vincent and Kevin Kerr, who had tallied four goals and three assists himself, was described by one analyst as, "the most entertaining pair of UK midfielders this side of the pond." The Riverhounds began their 2015 U.S. Open Cup campaign on May 20 with a 3–0 victory over the West Virginia Chaos with Vincent opening the scoring against his former team, Moloto scoring his first competitive goal for the club, and Kerr getting the final tally. The victory set up a third round encounter with the Tampa Bay Rowdies of the North American Soccer League at Highmark Stadium. The match would mark the first time that the Hounds had ever hosted a higher division club or a non-USL professional club for a competitive match at Highmark Stadium. With Vincent scoring the game-winner again, this time in stoppage time, the Riverhounds defeated the Rowdies 1–0, setting up an encounter with D.C. United of Major League Soccer at Highmark Stadium in the fourth round, the first match of any kind between the Riverhounds and a MLS side at Highmark Stadium. Three days later on May 30, 2015, the Riverhounds played what one columnist called the "club's greatest ever game" as the team scored three goals in stoppage time for a 6–5 victory over the Harrisburg City Islanders. Vincent and Danny Earls tallied braces for the club while Kerr scored the game-winner. Amara Soumah also scored his first league goal in the match while Ryan Hulings earned his first league appearance and victory. In the match, Lebo Moloto also became the first player to tally three assists in a single match in league history. The match's eleven total goals set a league regular season record for combined goals in a match. The Riverhounds 2015 U.S. Open Cup run came to an end on June 17 as D.C. United defeated the Hounds 3–1. The match was tied 1–1 after regulation time, with Vincent converting a penalty for Pittsburgh goal. D.C. United scored two goals in the two added 15-minute periods to earn the victory in front of a near-record crowd at Highmark Stadium. Entering the final two games of the regular season, Pittsburgh needed to earn four points to qualify for the playoffs. The Riverhounds drew 1–1 with the regular season champion Rochester Rhinos on September 16, setting up a decisive match away at rivals Harrisburg on the final matchday of the season. The Riverhounds went on to earn a 2–1 victory in the match, clinching a playoff spot and fifth place in the eastern conference, in addition to securing the inaugural Keystone Derby Cup between the two Pennsylvania clubs. The team's season came to an end with a 2–4 extra time defeat to the New York Red Bulls II in the first round of the playoffs. The club finished the regular season with 55 goals scored, the most scored by any team in the league.

=== 2016 ===
Only days after being eliminated from the 2015 playoffs, club president Richard Nightingale announced that Kevin Kerr and Rob Vincent would be returning for the 2016 season, while the club continued to identify new talent to add to the roster. However, in early October 2015, it was revealed that Vincent was on trial with D.C. United of Major League Soccer. On February 17, 2016, it was officially announced that Vincent had impressed D.C. United during their preseason and that he had been purchased by the club for an undisclosed amount. On November 2, 2015, it was announced that Richard Nightingale was no longer with the team and that Shallenberger had taken over as acting president. One source indicated the reason for the dismissal was a rift between the former general manager and the ownership, staff, and players created by Nightingale trying to impose his own decisions that Shallenberger preferred to leave to Steffens. However, multiple sources stated that Nightingale left the team on his own accord to pursue another opportunity and to return to his family in Oregon who did not travel with him to Pittsburgh. The same day, the Riverhounds officially moved into their new training facility, the Allegheny Health Network Sports Complex. The new facility allowed for year-round training and for all levels of the organization, from academy to first team, to practice at the same location. In November 2015 it was announced that Jamaican international goalkeeper Ryan Thompson and the Riverhounds agreed to mutually part ways in the offseason so that he could pursue a contract in Europe or Major League Soccer following his performances as Jamaica's starter at the 2015 CONCACAF Gold Cup. After one season without an MLS affiliate, it was announced that the club had formed an affiliate partnership with the reigning Eastern Conference playoff champion and MLS Cup runner-up Columbus Crew SC for the 2016 season. The partnership would make the Riverhounds the primary destination for loaned players throughout the USL season. The two clubs had worked together previously as Matt Lampson was loaned to the Riverhounds from the Crew during the previous season. The Riverhounds received Marshall Hollingsworth and Ben Swanson in March 2016 as the first players loaned through the affiliation. Prior to the opening game of the 2016 season, the Riverhounds unveiled a signature beer available at Highmark Stadium, Golden Hound Ale brewed by Pittsburgh-based Penn Brewery. Although three Major League Soccer clubs previously created signature beers, the Riverhounds became the first USL club to do so. Following the sixth match of the season on May 7, 2016, the contract of Romeo Parkes, the team's top goal scorer, was terminated after he kicked New York Red Bulls II defender Karl Ouimette from behind in an incident that sent the player to the hospital. The following week, the Riverhounds were part of a 0–1 defeat to FC Cincinnati which set the USL league attendance record for a single match with over 23,000 fans in attendance at Cincinnati's Nippert Stadium. After not recording a win in the club's first seven games of the season and being eliminated from the 2016 U.S. Open Cup after losing its first match to amateur side Landsdowne Bhoys FC 0–2, head coach Mark Steffens was relieved of his duties on May 21, 2016. The following morning Dave Brandt, head coach of the Navy Midshipmen, was named the club's new manager. The Hounds finished the season with a 6–17–7 record and missed the playoffs for the ninth time in the club's seventeen-season existence. Club owner Tuffy Shallenberger said during a September 2016 interview that he would be focusing on improving marketing for the club, including a possible total rebranding. The club's top scorer for the season was Corey Hertzog who scored 13 goals in 30 matches and finishing the league golden boot race in sixth place. He also led the club in games played, minutes, assists, points, shots, and shots on goal. He was named to the USL League Second Team following the season.

=== 2017 ===
Notable offseason signings included former United States international Gale Agbossoumonde, Saint Kitts and Nevis international Devaughn Elliott, and Barbados international Keasel Broome. The Riverhounds opened the 2017 season at home against defending champions New York Red Bulls II on March 25, 2017. The match ended in a 3–3 draw, with two of the team's goals coming from Corey Hertzog and another from captain Kevin Kerr. The team was eliminated from the 2017 U.S. Open Cup with a 1 to 3 defeat to amateur side Chicago FC United in the second round. The team failed to make the playoffs. Corey Hertzog was the team's top scorer as he moved into third place on its all-time top scorers list. Following the 2017 season, it was announced that the affiliation between Columbus Crew SC and the Riverhounds that had been in place since 2015 had comes to an end. Reasons for the discontinuation included the potential move of the Crew franchise to Austin, Texas and the roster inconsistency that the affiliation caused.

=== 2018 ===
Saint Louis FC announced the signing of Riverhounds SC's top scorer Corey Hertzog on December 11, 2017, ending the striker's two-year stint with the club. In January 2018 the United States Soccer Federation formally maintained the sanctioning of the United Soccer League as the second tier of the United States soccer league system. To meet division II coaching requirements, Bob Lilley was named the team's new head coach, replacing Dave Brandt who did not hold an "A" license and was therefore not eligible to coach in the league. Lilley brought other members of his former coaching staff at the Rochester Rhinos with him, including assistant coach Mark Pulisic. On February 16, 2018, the team held a special event to unveil new branding for the team. While the Riverhounds name was kept, "Soccer Club" was added to the official team name. The club also unveiled a new circular crest which replaced the hound head which had been a part of the team's logo since its original design. The new crest was designed in the traditional colors of Pittsburgh sports, black and gold, and incorporated iconic symbols of the city including its bridges and rivers. Also announced during the event was the expansion of Highmark Stadium to 5,000 seats which was also required by Division II requirements.

== Head coaching history ==
Name	Nationality	From	To	Honors	Notes
John Kowalski	Poland	November 5, 1998	February 7, 2001		
Kai Haaskivi	Finland	February 7, 2001	July 8, 2002		
Tim Carter (interim)	United States	July 8, 2002	September 5, 2002		
Tim Carter	United States	September 5, 2002	July 11, 2003		
Ricardo Iribarren	Argentina	July 11, 2003	December 15, 2005	USL Atlantic Division champions: 2004	
Gene Klein	United States	December 15, 2005	January 11, 2010		
Justin Evans	United States	January 11, 2010	May 19, 2014		
Nikola Katic (interim)	Croatia	May 19, 2014	December 17, 2014		
Mark Steffens	United States	December 17, 2014	May 21, 2016		
Dave Brandt	United States	May 22, 2016	November 14, 2017		
Bob Lilley	United States	November 14, 2017	December 10, 2025	USL Championship Players' Shield: 2023; USL Championship Coach of the Year: 2023	
Rob Vincent (interim)	England	October 10, 2025	December 19, 2025	USL Championship Champions: 2025	
Rob Vincent	England	December 19, 2025	Present		

== Stadium history ==
Period	Stadium	Location	Ref.
1999–2003	Bethel Park High School Stadium	Bethel Park	
2004	Moon Area High School Stadium	Moon Township	
2005–2006	Falconi Field	Washington	
2008–2012	Chartiers Valley High School Stadium	Bridgeville	
2013–present	Highmark Stadium	Pittsburgh	

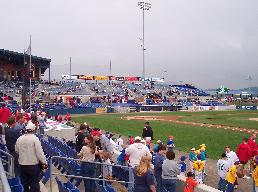
Falconi Field

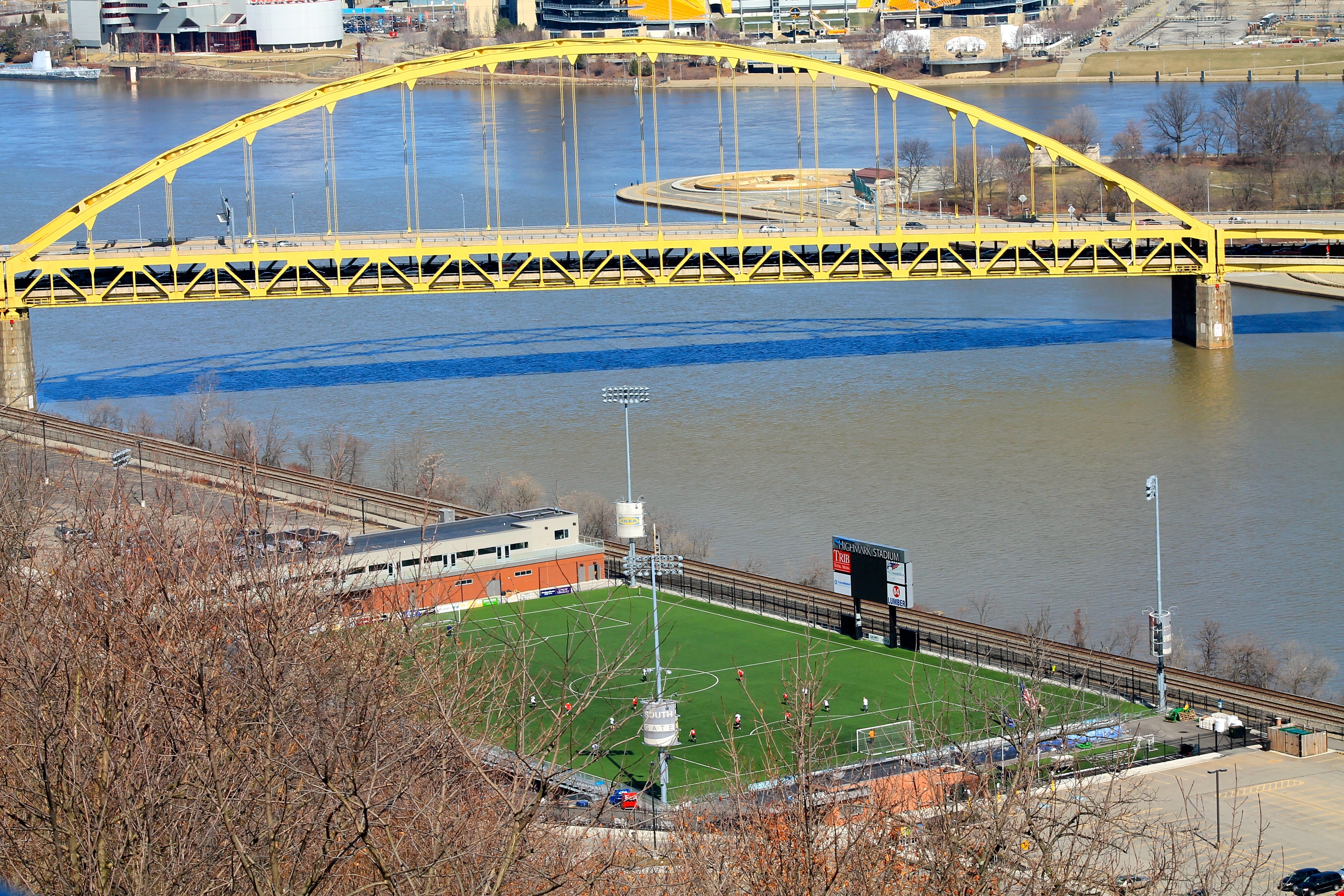
Highmark Stadium as seen from Mount Washington

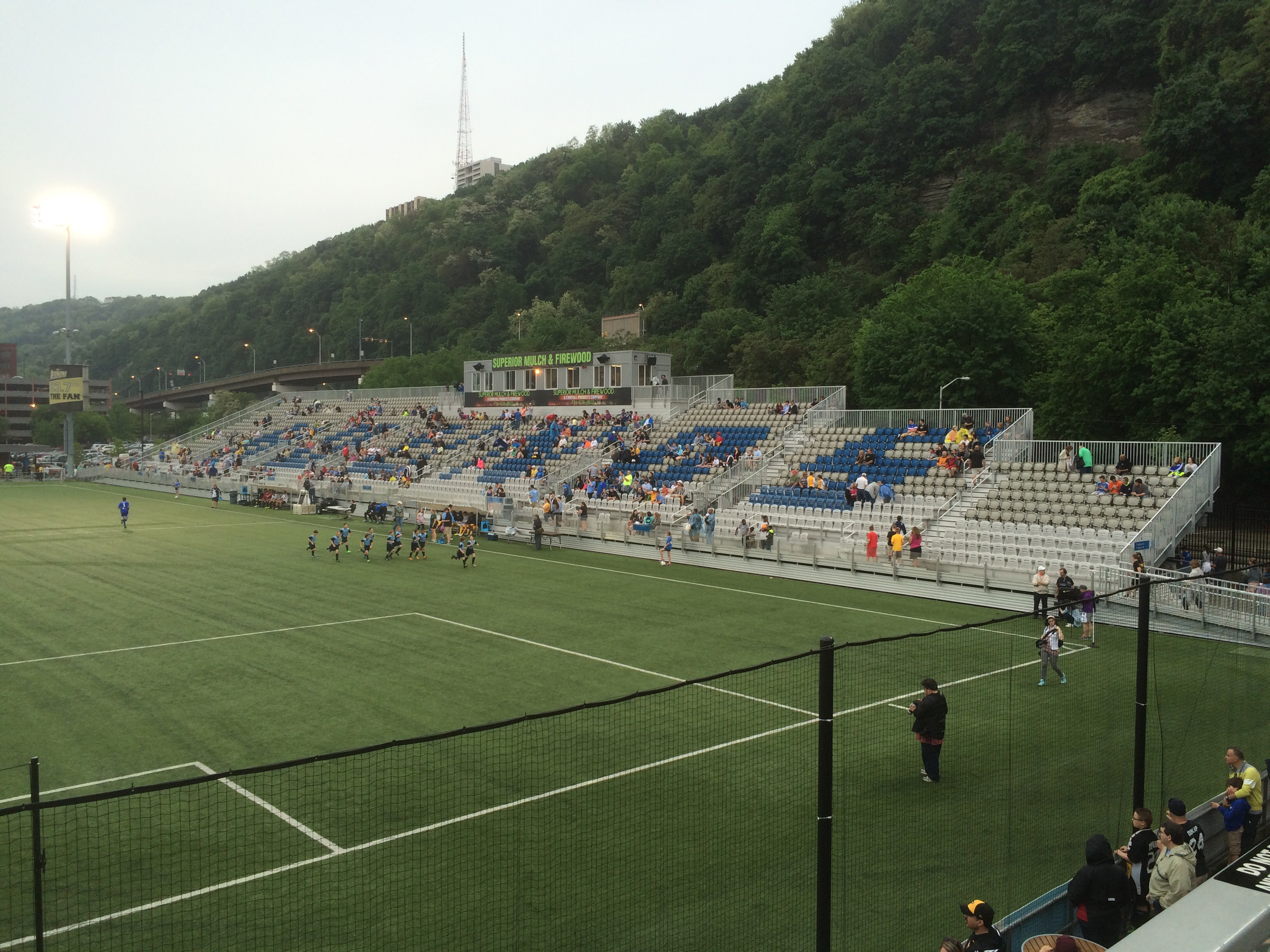
Highmark Stadium main stand

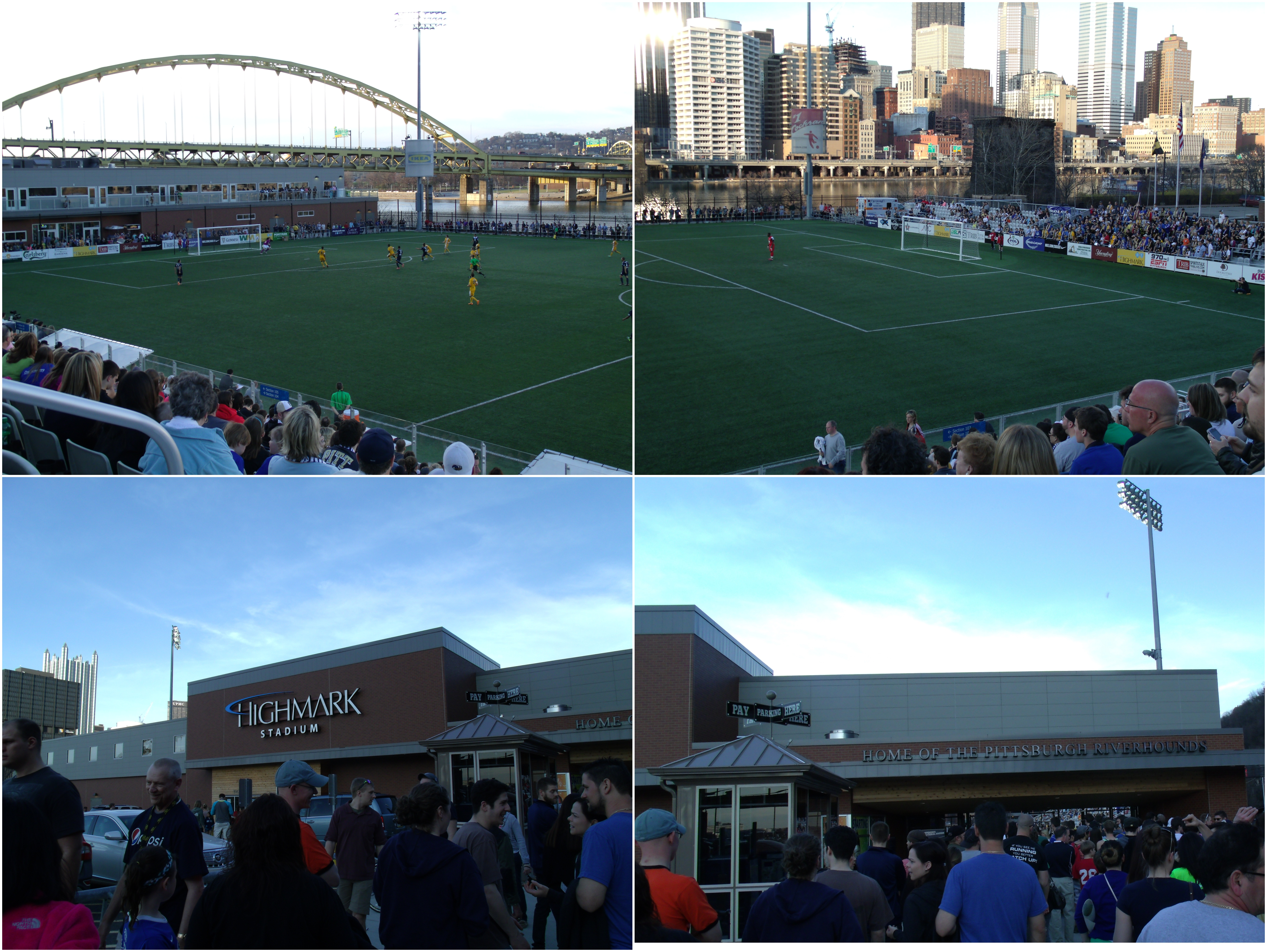
Highmark Stadium

== Player development history ==
=== Academy ===
In 2007, the Riverhounds formed the Riverhounds Academy around the time that the team was purchased by the Greentree SportsPlex ownership group. Jason Kutney was named the academy's Director of Youth Development. The academy was originally created as a partnership with Premier League club Everton. The partnership with the English club would allow the Riverhounds to share the same training methods and some of the same coaches. Former Riverhounds coach and general manager Gene Klein said, "The agreement is one of the first of its kind in the United States and will raise the level of soccer played in Western Pennsylvania from youth leagues to the Riverhounds." By 2009, the academy had expanded into a year-round program. As of 2013, the academy had between 800 and 1,000 players in its year-round program at any given time, while 1,500 more took part in more than 20 different camps held in the region throughout the year. The Riverhounds Development Academy (RDA) trains players between the ages of 3 and 17. The academy has experienced rapid expansion, increasing the number of participants from 244 in 2007 to over 700 in 2012. As of 2013, the academy generated 80% of the Riverhounds organization's revenue with revenue from the academy increasing from $124,000 to $900,000 over the same period. At that time, the academy maintained a waiting list to join of over 250 youth players. In 2013, the Riverhounds officially unveiled its first registered team to represent the professional club in youth competitions around the United States. Only ten months after the team's inception, it was crowned national champions in U.S. Club Soccer's top youth bracket, defeating top teams from around the country and drawing interest from top NCAA Division I coaches and the United States National Team. Since then, the Academy has sent four of its members to U.S. National Team camps and over 30 players have been invited to the United States Soccer Federation's training center in Ohio. In April 2015, it was announced that the Riverhounds Academy would shift its center of operations from the Greentree SportsPlex to the Allegheny Health Network Sports Complex at Cool Springs in Pittsburgh's South Hills. The 172,000-square-foot indoor multi-sport complex will offer outpatient orthopedic care, diagnostics and athletic training services through Allegheny Health Network and a full-size indoor field which will allow the academy to train year round. The academy officially moved to the new facility on November 2, 2015.

=== PDL/USL2 club ===
On November 26, 2013, it was announced that the Pittsburgh Riverhounds had secured a Premier Development League franchise that would begin play during the 2014 season as part of the club's player development system as a link between the academy and senior squad. Riverhounds CEO Jason Kutney stated that the purpose of the team would be to provide standout local college players a place to play in the summer, something that they had not previously had. Kutney also believed that providing the opportunity to stay fit and play soccer in the region year-round would attract more players to the area in addition to providing players with the opportunity to be observed by USL and Major League Soccer scouts. In March 2015, Pittsburgh native Anthony Virgara became the first player to sign for the senior squad from the U23 side. Virgara also previously played for a local Riverhounds affiliated academy. The PDL club was dissolved following the 2016 season citing limited resources.

On December 12, 2025, the Riverhounds announced a new development team, known as Pittsburgh Riverhounds 2, to begin competing in the USL League Two beginning in the 2026 season.

== Broadcasting history ==
In 2000, the Riverhounds reached an agreement with WPTT to broadcast matches on the radio. Chris Shovlin was the play-by-play announcer on WPTT from 2000 to 2003. Shovlin was partnered with former Riverhounds midfielder Steve Bell during this time. Beginning in 2004, matches were broadcast on WBGG-AM with Shovlin resuming his role as play-by-play announcer. Shovlin won the 2003 Pittsburgh March of Dimes A.I.R. Award for best play-by-play. Following Pittsburgh's hiatus in 2007, matches were broadcast on WPIT with Shovlin again returning as the commentator.

The Riverhounds also reached radio broadcast deals with Fox Sports Radio – Pittsburgh, including in 2005. Chris Shovlin returned to form a play-by-play partnership with former Riverhounds assistant coach Paul Child on Fox Sports Radio. In 2005, FSN Pittsburgh broadcast two Riverhounds matches, the first television broadcasts in franchise history. In 2015 the Riverhounds were again broadcast on cable, this time on WPNT for a match against the Charleston Battery on September 5.

In April 2016, the USL announced that the league had entered into an agreement with ESPN to broadcast the USL Championship match on its cable network while digitally streaming regular season matches on ESPN3. The Riverhounds appeared in the first two matches streamed on this service, including the first broadcast which featured a home match against Orlando City B.

All live USL matches are streamed on-demand in high definition free at youtube.com/USLPRO beginning with the 2014 season. Current broadcasters are Matt Gajtka (play-by-play), Gene Klein (analysis/sideline), and Paul Child (analysis).
