= 2011 Pittsburgh Riverhounds season =

Pittsburgh Riverhounds
2011 season
- Owner: Gene Klein
- Head coach: Justin Evans
- Stadium: Chartiers Valley Stadium
- USL Professional Division: TBD
- USL Pro Playoffs: TBD
- U.S. Open Cup: Second Round
- Highest home attendance: 1,421 vs Charlotte August 6, 2011
- Lowest home attendance: 624 vs Charleston May 6, 2011
- Average home league attendance: 1,130
Home colors	Away colors

The 2011 Pittsburgh Riverhounds season was the club's thirteenth year of existence, as well as their twelfth season of playing professional soccer. The Riverhounds played in the newly created USL Professional Division, which encompasses the third tier of American soccer.

The Riverhounds had previously played in the USL Second Division, the third tier of American soccer.

== Club ==
=== Roster ===
As at June 10, 2011

Note: Flags indicate national team as defined under FIFA eligibility rules; some limited exceptions apply. Players may hold more than one non-FIFA nationality.

No.	Pos.	Nation	Player
0	GK	USA	Gregory Blum
1	GK	USA	Hunter Gilstrap
3	DF	USA	Kyle Veris
4	DF	CRO	Nikola Katic
5	DF	USA	Sterling Flunder
6	MF	USA	Adam Gazda
7	MF	USA	Thomas Gray
8	FW	USA	Matthew Fondy
9	MF	RSA	Thabiso Khumalo
10	MF	USA	Matt Tuttle
11	FW	USA	Jason Yeisley

No.	Pos.	Nation	Player
12	DF	USA	Mike Seth
13	DF	USA	Louie Rolko
14	MF	USA	Stefan Lundberg
15	MF	USA	Ben Horner
16	FW	USA	Jeremy Deighton
17	MF	GHA	Samuel Appiah
18	DF	USA	Neil Shaffer
19	MF	USA	Jason Kutney
20	FW	USA	Chad Severs
21	MF	JPN	Shintaro Harada
24	GK	USA	Derek Yobbi

=== Management and staff ===
- (United States) Justin Evans - Head Coach
- (United States) John Rotz- Assistant Coach
- (Netherlands) Jeroen Walstra - Goalkeeper Coach
- (United States) Jason Kutney - Chief Executive Officer/Director of Youth Development
- (United States) Gene Klein - Technical Director

== Transfers ==
=== In ===
#	Date	Player	Pos.	Previous club	Transfer type	Fee/notes	Ref.
9	March 14, 2011	(South Africa) Thabiso Khumalo	MF	(United States) Louisville Lightning	Free	Did not renew contract. Signed with club on free transfer.
17	March 31, 2011	(Ghana) Samuel Appiah	MF	(United States) Houston Dynamo	Free	Released by Houston. Signed with club on free transfer.
	April 1, 2011	(United States) Neil Shaffer	DF	(United States) Robert Morris Colonials	Free	Undrafted in MLS, signed pro contract.
