= Senator Horne =

Senator Horne may refer to:

- Jim Horne (Florida politician) (born 1959), Florida State Senate
- Mallory Horne (1925–2009), Florida State Senate
- Thomas Van Horne (1782–1841), Ohio State Senate

== See also ==
- Senator Horn (disambiguation)
- Senator Horner (disambiguation)
