= Eugene Klein =

Eugene or Gene Klein may refer to:

- Gene Klein (1921–1990), American entrepreneur and sportsman
- Gene Klein (soccer) (1952–2023), American soccer coach
- Eugene Klein (philatelist) (1878–1944), American stamp collector
- Gene Simmons (born 1949), a.k.a. Gene Klein, American rock musician
- Eugene Klein, American cellist with the Delaware Symphony Orchestra

== See also ==
- Jean Klein (disambiguation)
- Gene Clines, American baseball player
