= William Horner =

William Horner may refer to:

- William George Horner (1786–1837), British mathematician
- William Horner (cricketer) (1830–1905), English cricketer
- Billy Horner (born 1942), English footballer and manager

== See also ==
- George William Horner, British biblical scholar
