= Jean Klein =

Jean Klein may refer to:

- Jean Klein (footballer) (born 1942), Luxembourgian footballer
- Jean Klein (rower) (born 1944), French rower
- Jean Klein (spiritual teacher) (1912–1998), French spiritual teacher

== See also ==
- Jean Kleyn (born 1993), South African rugby union player
- Eugene Klein (disambiguation)
