= Senator Horn =

Senator Horn may refer to:

- Barbara Horn (born 1936), Arkansas State Senate
- Chuck Horn (1924–2022), Ohio State Senate
- Fred Horn (1925–2018), Alabama State Senate
- Frederick W. Horn (1815–1893), Wisconsin State Senate
- Jim Horn (politician) (born 1930), Washington State Senate
- John J. Horn (1917–1999), New Jersey State Senate
- Kenneth Horn (born 1959), Michigan State Senate
- Wally Horn (born 1933), Iowa State Senate

== See also ==
- Senator Horne (disambiguation)
- John Horhn (born 1955), Mississippi State Senate
