= F.N.B. Stadium (Pittsburgh) =

Soccer stadium in Pennsylvania, U.S.

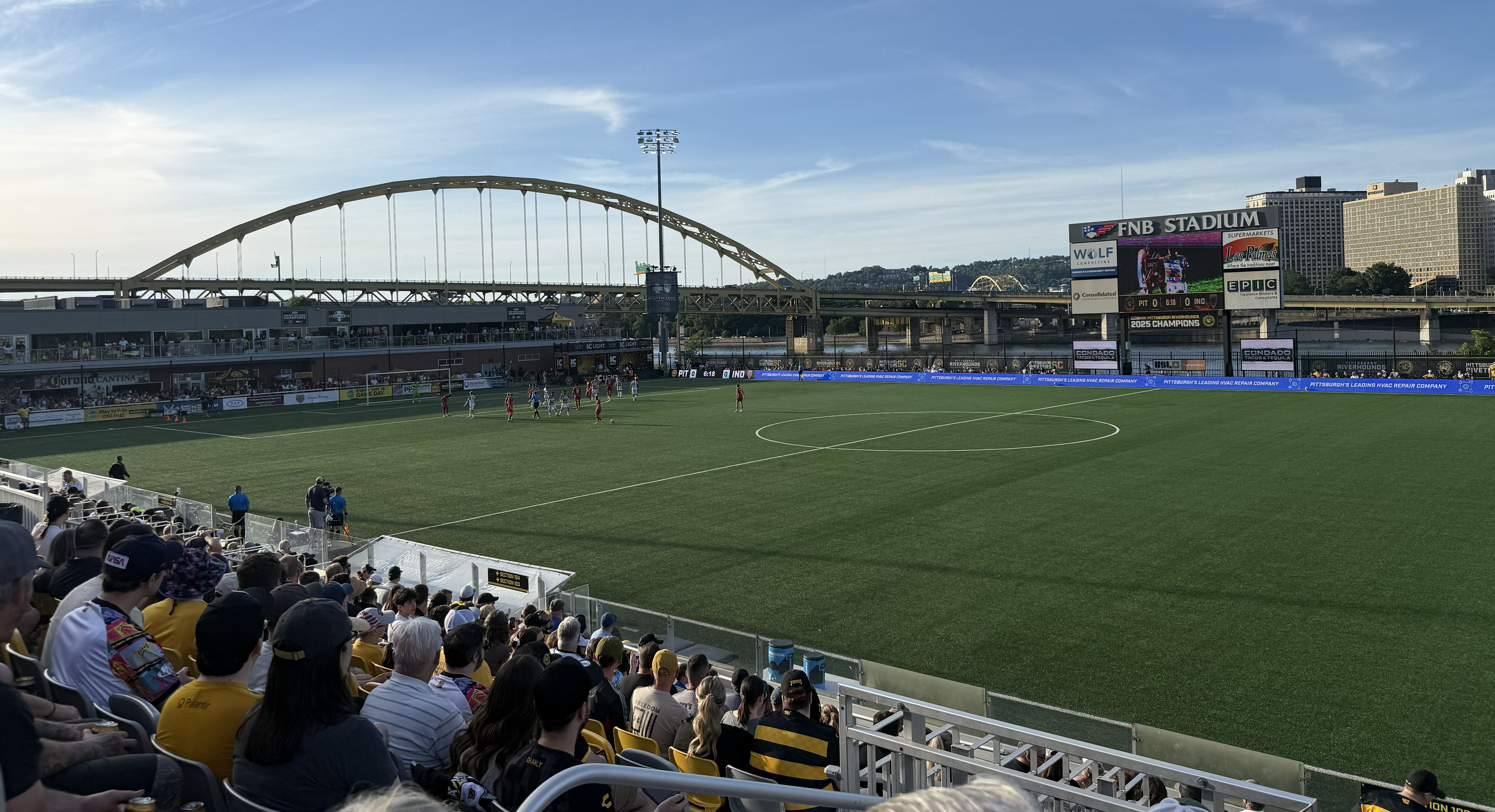
- The field from upper-level seating in 2026

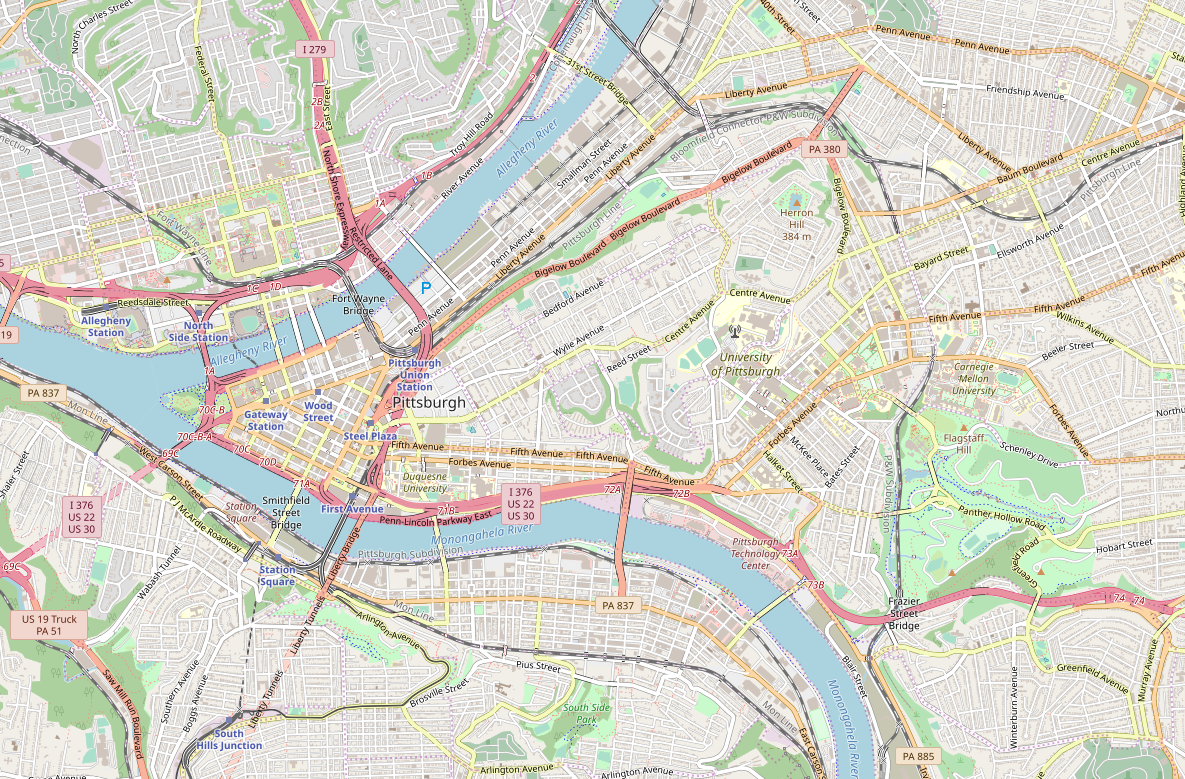
- Location within Downtown Pittsburgh Location within Pennsylvania Location within the United States
- Interactive map of F.N.B. Stadium
- Former names: Highmark Stadium (2013–2026)
- Address: 510 West Station Square Drive; Pittsburgh, Pennsylvania, United States; 15219
- Location: Station Square
- Coordinates: 40°26′10″N 80°0′34″W
- Owner: Terry "Tuffy" Shallenberger (majority)
- Operator: Pittsburgh Riverhounds SC
- Capacity: 3,500 (2013–2018); 5,000 (2018–present)
- Type: Soccer-specific stadium
- Surface: FIFA 2-Star Certified hybrid-turf
- Record attendance: 6,107 (May 24, 2023); 6,220 (November 8, 2025); 6,745 (November 15, 2025)
- Field size: 110 m × 70 m (360 ft × 230 ft)
- Public transit: Station Square

Construction
- Groundbreaking: June 25, 2012
- Opened: April 13, 2013
- Renovated: 2018
- Cost: $10.2 million
- Architects: ThenDesign Architecture, Inc.
- Project managers: Millcraft Industries, Inc.
- Structural engineers: Alber & Rice, Inc.
- General contractor: Nello Construction

Tenants
- Current: Pittsburgh Riverhounds SC (USLC) 2013–present; Pittsburgh Thunderbirds (AUDL) 2023–present; Pittsburgh Riveters SC (USLW) 2025–present; Pittsburgh Riverhounds 2 (USL2) 2014–2016, 2026–present; Former: Pittsburgh Passion (WFA) 2013–2015; Pittsburgh Rebellion (LFL) 2017

Website
- highmarkstadium.com

F.N.B. Stadium is a 5,000-seat soccer-specific stadium in Pittsburgh, Pennsylvania, United States. Located at the Station Square complex, it is home to Pittsburgh Riverhounds SC of the USL Championship, Pittsburgh Riveters SC of the USL W League, and the Pittsburgh Thunderbirds of the Ultimate Frisbee Association (UFA). The stadium was also home to the Pittsburgh Rebellion women's football team for 2017. Three local colleges use the stadium for soccer, lacrosse, and rugby, and six different local high schools will use the field for soccer and lacrosse.

The $10.2 million project began with the demolition and excavation of the former Trib Total Media Amphitheatre, building foundations for the scoreboard, light poles, and grading foundations for the grandstands, as well as the installation of underground utilities. The stadium opened in 2013 as Highmark Stadium. The field surface is FIFA 2-star certified artificial turf, the highest rating that an artificial surface can achieve, one of only six fields in the country to earn that rating. Other fields to earn this rating in the United States include Providence Park, Lumen Field, and Gillette Stadium, all of which house Major League Soccer franchises.

On August 1, 2015, the supporters' section was renamed the Paul Child Stand in honor of Pittsburgh soccer legend Paul Child.

FNB Stadium is notable for its picturesque albeit unusual layout, with the Monongahela River near the field. As a result, during daytime broadcasts of Riverhound matches, the river serves as a backdrop for the action on the field. Ben Zand of the BBC said the venue is "[...]probably the most beautiful stadium I've ever seen."

== History ==
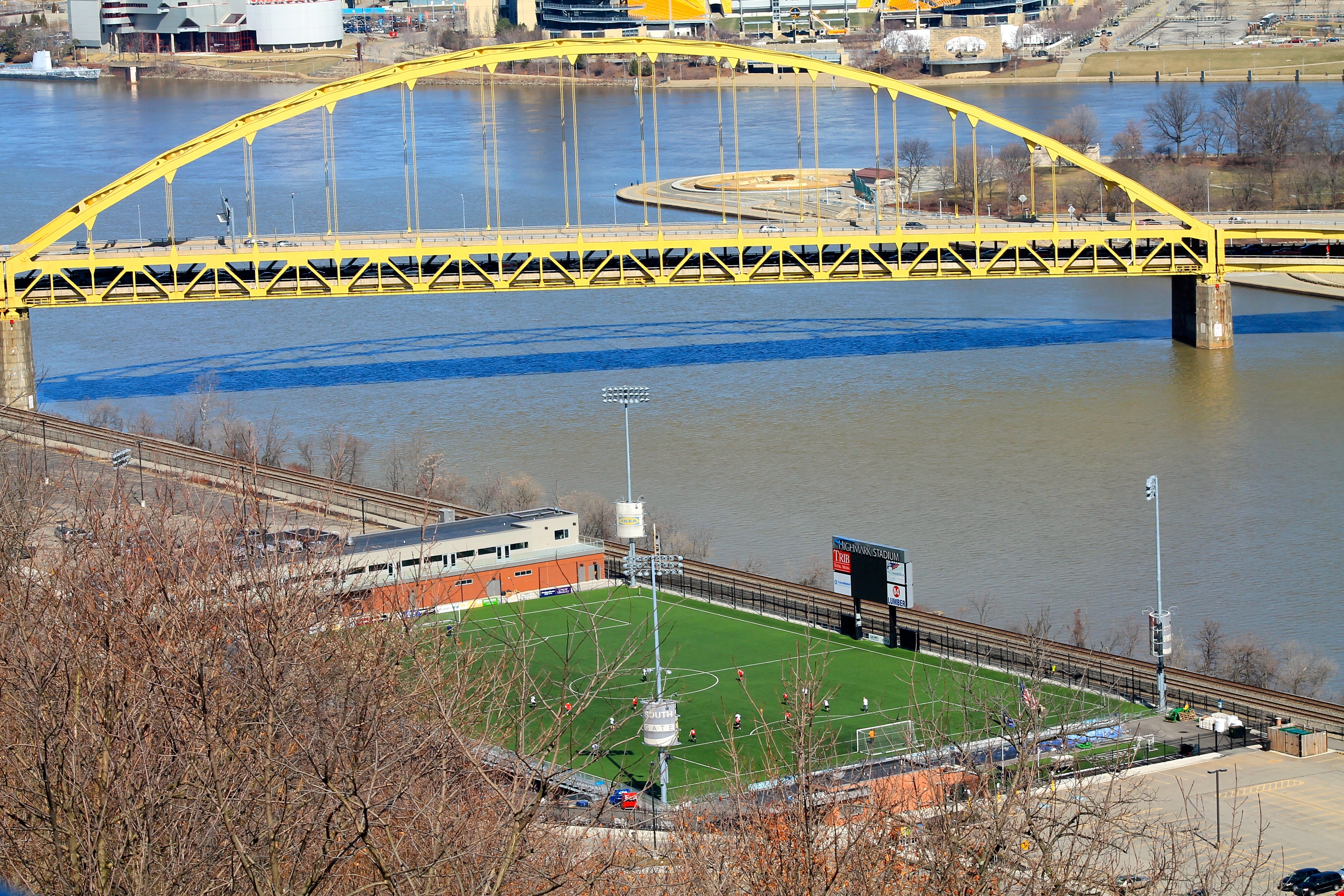
Seen from Mount Washington

Since the team's creation, there had been no official announcement concerning a permanent home for the Hounds, but much had been speculated since GM and manager Gene Klein, on July 13, 2007, said that the Riverhounds "are to the point on the stadium complex where it is a matter of paperwork and it will get done. We hope to make an official announcement on it...but like everything else, we'll walk with it before we try and run. We are doing things the right way." On July 9, 2008, Dan Onorato, Chief Executive of Allegheny County, announced a planned development of a 78-acre (320,000 m^{2}) sports and recreation park that covers area near Pittsburgh in Coraopolis, Robinson, and Moon known as Montour Junction. The land was donated to the county's Redevelopment Authority by the Sports Legacy Foundation, which is chaired by Riverhounds founder and former owner Paul Heasley. The SLF had owned the land since 2002 and had already spent about $60k for the environmental cleanup of the land, which was once owned by the Pittsburgh and Lake Erie Railroad and had been declared a brownfield. The proposed uses for the park included soccer pitches as well as other multipurpose team sports fields such as rugby and lacrosse. Many believed that the team would build a stadium around one of the fields, which would likely become the permanent home for the Hounds. However, these plans never materialized.

Despite speculation and previous attempts to build a permanent home for the Riverhounds at other locations, the club revealed on December 8, 2011, that it could build a stadium at Station Square on the site of the current amphitheater near downtown Pittsburgh as part of a redevelopment project. However, the proposed redevelopment lacked a set timeline at the time.

=== Construction ===
On January 10, 2012, officials announced that they would begin construction and complete the stadium by the summer of 2012. The stadium was financed with an estimated $7 million by private investors in addition to several corporate sponsors, including Highmark, who hold naming rights for the stadium. The club also announced that, while the stadium would be soccer specific, it would host other sporting and non-sporting events, including the home games of the Pittsburgh Passion. Riverhounds CEO Jason Kutney has also said that the stadium will allow the Riverhounds to explore hosting soccer teams from Europe and elsewhere to play friendlies as well as the possibility of bringing women's professional soccer to Pittsburgh.

Officials scheduled construction of the stadium to begin in late March or early April 2012, with completion expected during the summer of 2012. However, construction at the site began in August, several months behind schedule, and the stadium's opening was scheduled for fall 2012, maybe as soon as late September. The first Riverhounds match at the stadium was played on April 13, 2013, to a sold-out crowd, several months after the anticipated opening date. Naming rights for the stadium were purchased by Pittsburgh-based health insurance company Highmark and the stadium was subsequently named Highmark Stadium. Once completed, the Riverhounds became only the third USL Pro team to have their own soccer-specific stadium, along with the Charleston Battery (Blackbaud Stadium) and the Rochester Rhinos (Sahlen's Stadium).

Pittsburgh, Pennsylvania-based Millcraft Industries, Inc. coordinated construction activities for the multi-sport and entertainment facility, while Nello Construction, headquartered in Carnegie, Pennsylvania, served as Highmark Stadium's general contractor. The architect of record is Ohio-based ThenDesign Architecture.

In 2026, under a new naming rights agreement with First National Bank, the stadium was renamed F.N.B. Stadium.

== Sports events ==
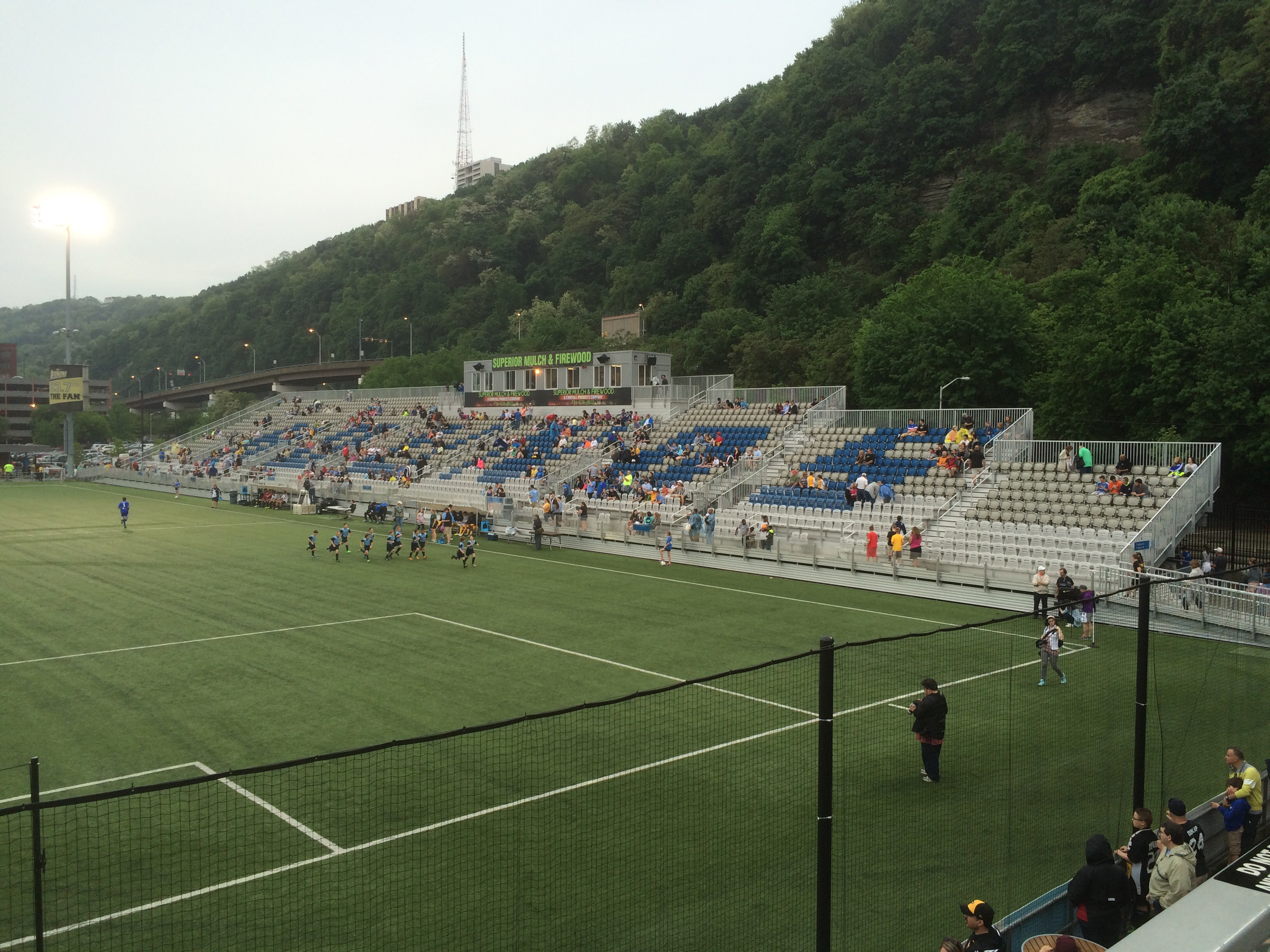
Main stand

In addition to soccer matches, the stadium was home to the Pittsburgh Rebellion of the Legends Football League for their inaugural season in 2017, as well as tournaments for soccer, football, lacrosse, rugby, and softball, and non-sporting events. The venue also accommodates concerts, cultural fairs, and special events. There are also plans to incorporate outdoor ice rinks during the winter months for public skate hours and amateur hockey games. It is also known for being the home stadium of the 6A powerhouse Central Catholic Vikings football team.

Highmark Stadium was the host site for 2023 Premier Rugby Sevens Eastern Conference Finals, the first professional rugby event in Pittsburgh's history.

On July 21, 2025, Highmark Stadium hosted Turf Wars II, the first boxing event in the venue's history.

== Expansion ==
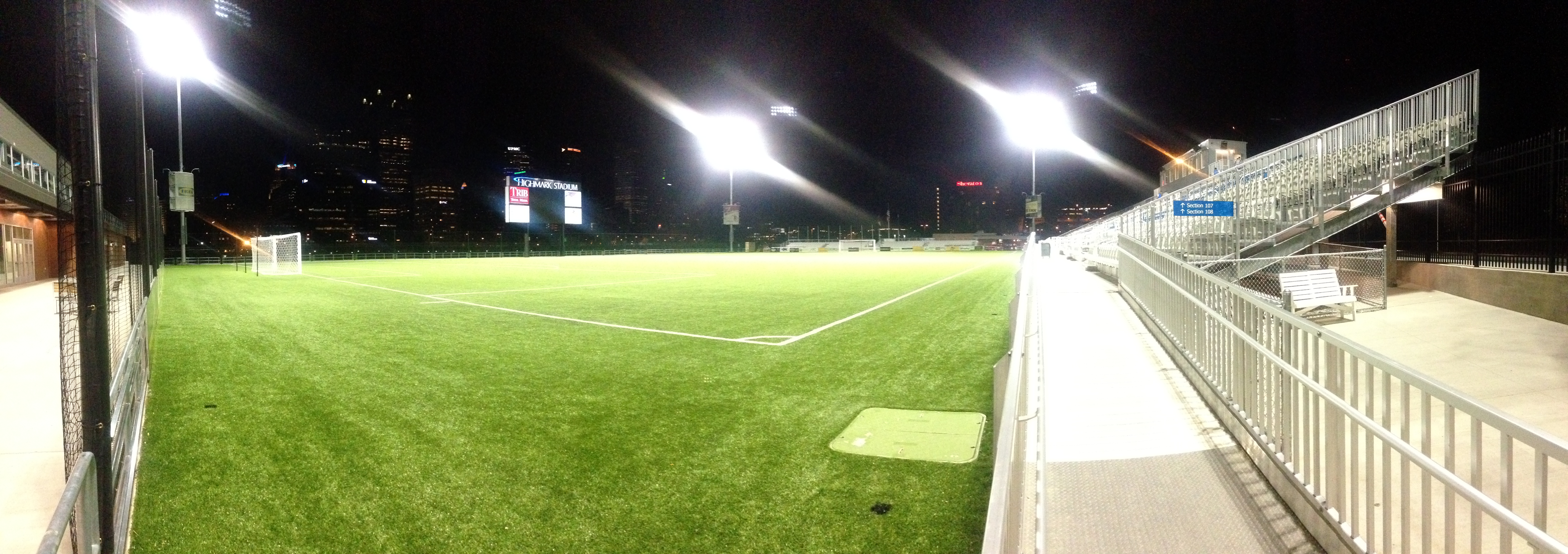
Night view

=== 2018 expansion ===
To meet USSF Division II requirements, Highmark Stadium began an expansion effort to add 1,000 seats, meeting the minimum required capacity of 5,000. The project was completed ahead of the 2019 season.

=== 2028 expansion ===
On August 19, 2025, the Riverhounds announced a planned expansion that would bring Highmark Stadium's capacity to 15,000. This, among other alterations, would bring the stadium in line with USSF Division I requirements, following the United Soccer League's announcement of a planned Division I league earlier that year. The expansion is expected to be complete by 2028.

== Attendance ==
| League | Season | Average attendance |
|---|---|---|
| USL Pro | 2013 | 3,273 |
| USL Pro | 2014 | 2,686 |
| USL | 2015 | 2,630 |
| USL | 2016 | 2,494 |
| USL | 2017 | 2,639 |
| USL | 2018 | 2,401 |
| USL Championship | 2019 | 3,729 |
| USL Championship | 2020 | N/A |
| USL Championship | 2021 | 3,132 |
| USL Championship | 2022 | 3,934 |
| USL Championship | 2023 | 5,077 |
| USL Championship | 2024 | 5,089 |
| USL Championship | 2025 | 4,865 |
| USL Championship | 2026 | 4,995 |

=== Largest soccer attendance ===
| Rank | Date | Attendance | Home Team | Opponent | Result | Notes |
|---|---|---|---|---|---|---|
| 1 | November 15, 2025 | 6,745 | Riverhounds | Rhode Island FC | W | 2025 USL Championship playoffs - Conference Finals |
| 2 | July 4, 2026 | 6,376 | Riverhounds | Brooklyn FC | L | |
| 3 | November 8, 2025 | 6,220 | Riverhounds | Detroit City FC | D (Adv. on PKs) | 2025 USL Championship playoffs - Conference Semifinals |
| 4 | May 24, 2023 | 6,107 | Riverhounds | Columbus Crew | W | 2023 U.S. Open Cup - Round of 16 |
| 5 | June 24, 2023 | 6,107 | Riverhounds | San Diego Loyal SC | W | |
| 6 | April 27, 2024 | 6,099 | Riverhounds | Detroit City FC | W | |
| 7 | May 16, 2025 | 6,077 | Riveters | Cleveland Force SC | D | Riveters' debut Match |
| 8 | November 2, 2019 | 6,073 | Riverhounds | Louisville City FC | L | 2019 USL Championship Playoffs - Conference Semifinals |
| 9 | May 30, 2026 | 6,053 | Riverhounds | Miami FC | W | |
| 10 | September 30, 2023 | 6,045 | Riverhounds | FC Tulsa | W | |

== Events ==
=== Concerts ===
The first concert at the stadium was The Steve Miller Band featuring Don Felder of The Eagles in July 2015.

| Date | Performer(s) |
|---|---|
| July 11, 2015 | The Steve Miller Band |
| June 5, 2019 | Sammy Hagar |
| September 27, 2019 | Toby Keith |

== Gallery ==
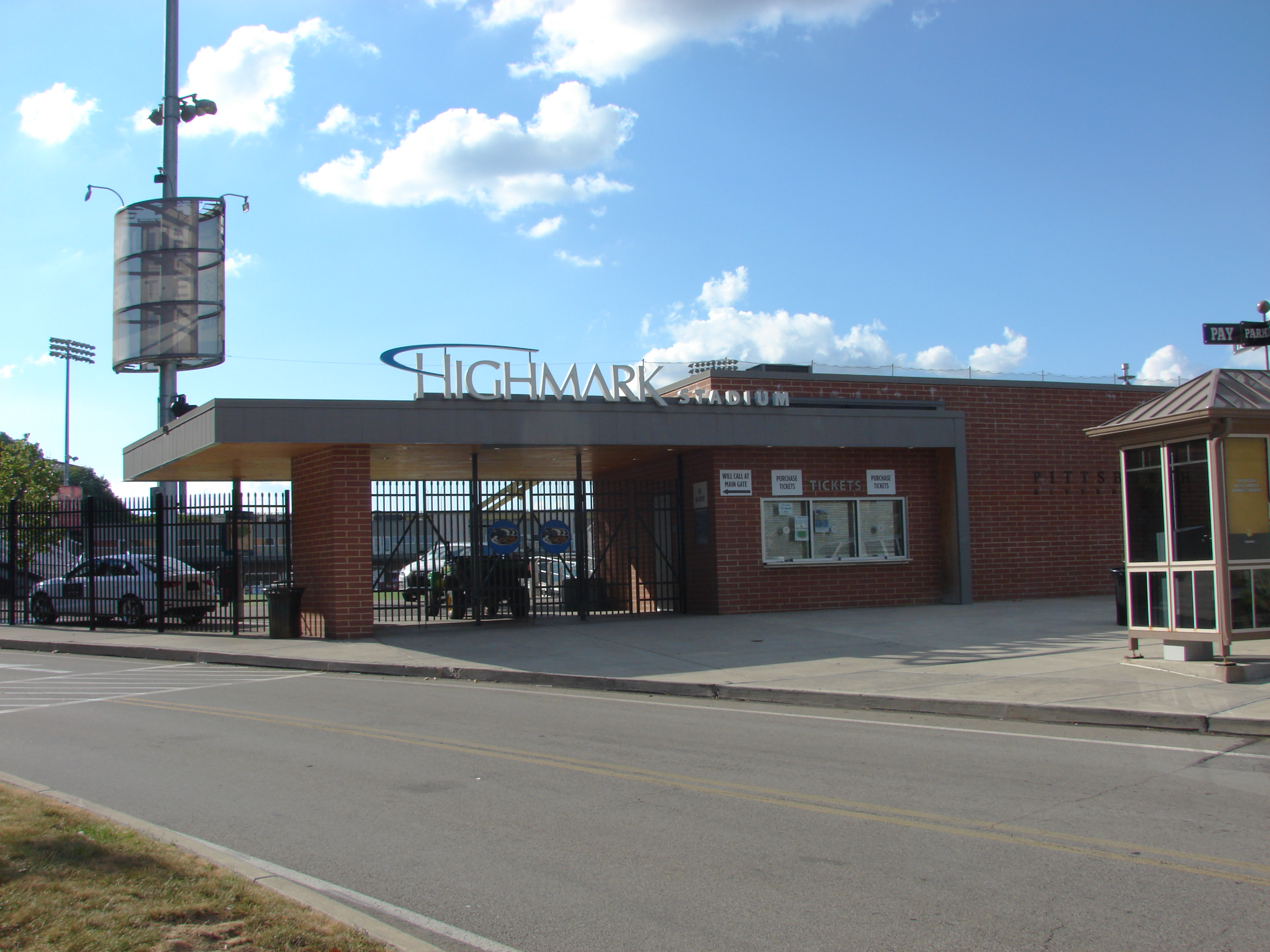
East entrance

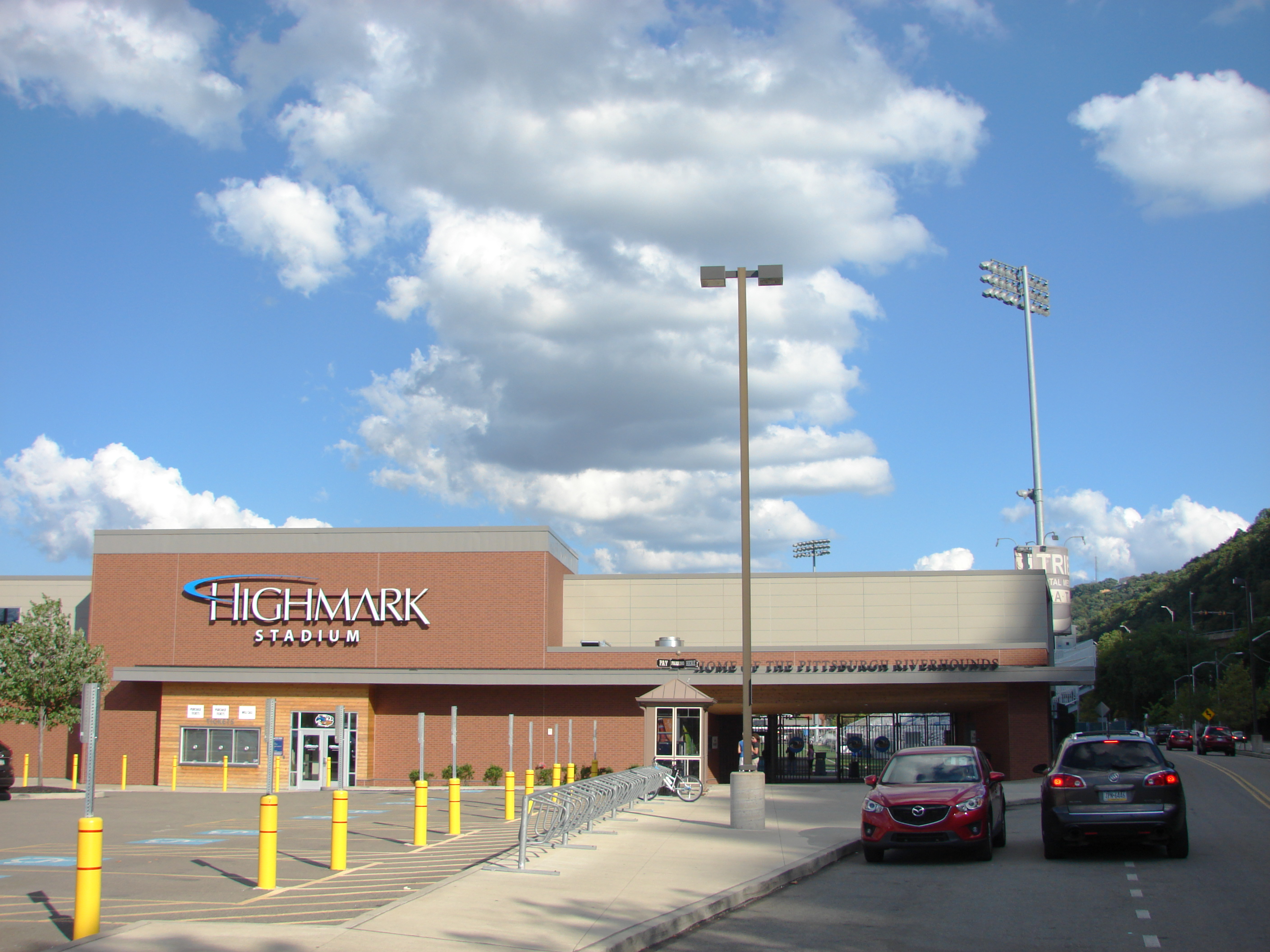
West entrance

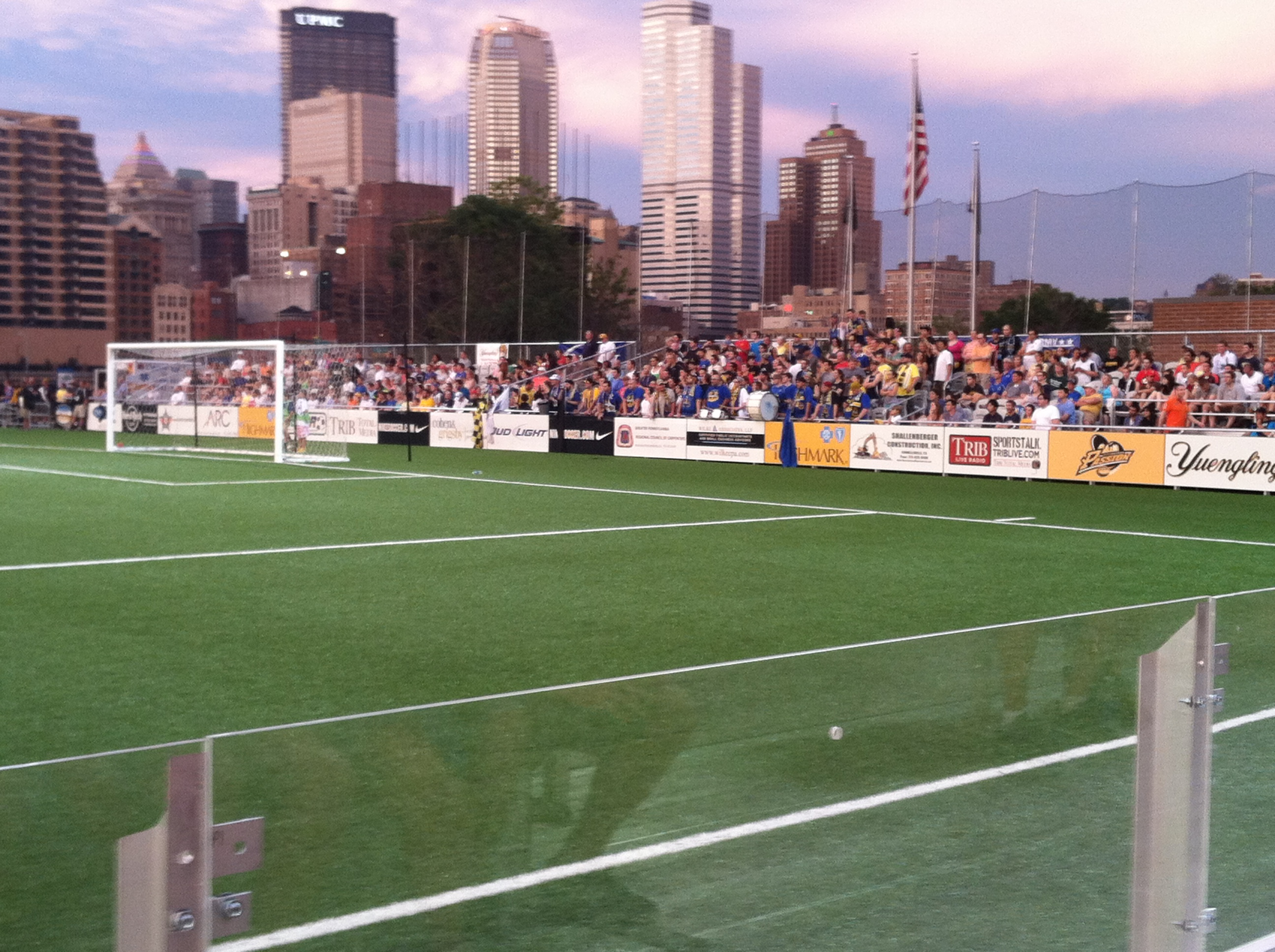
Side view

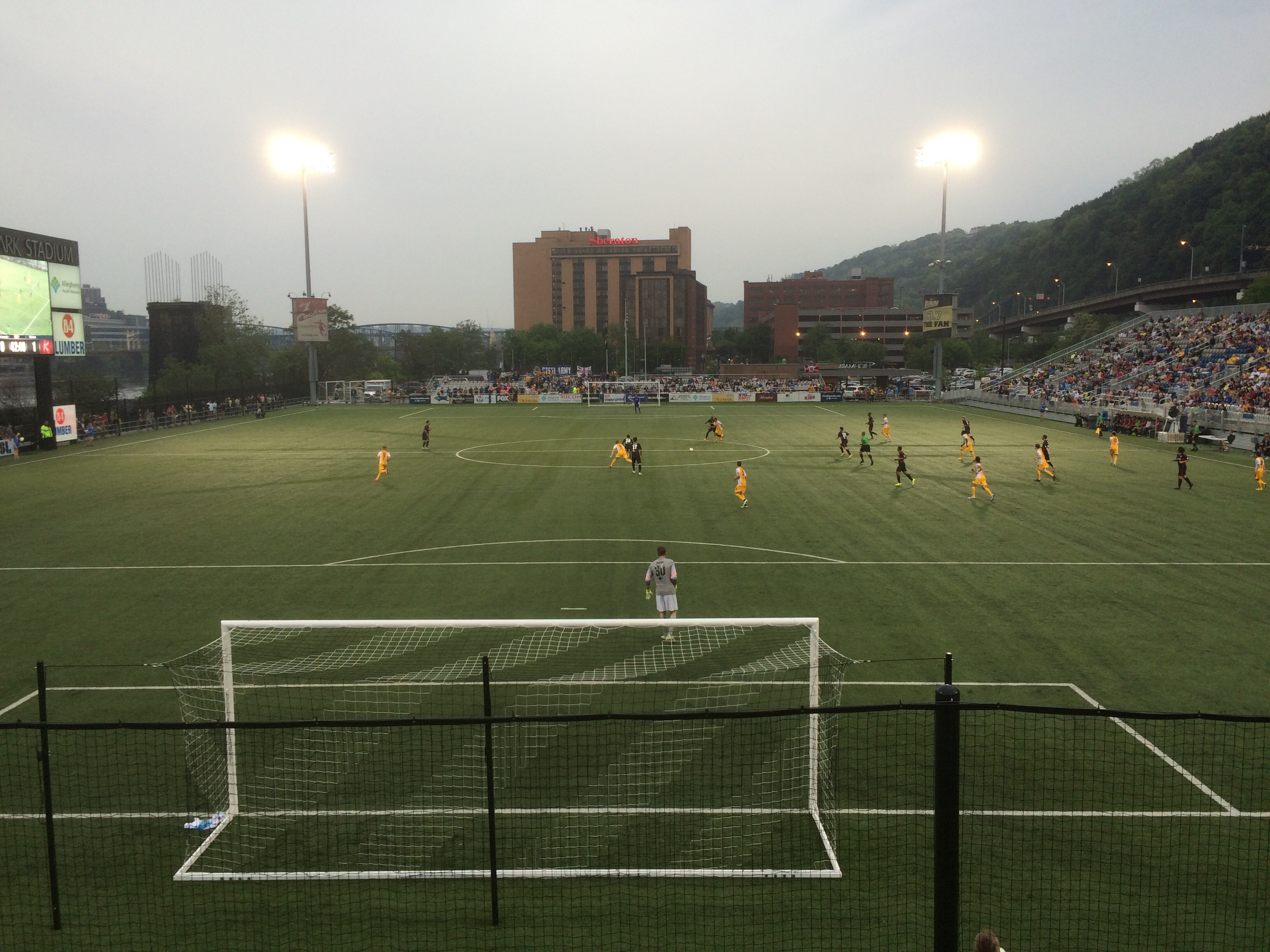
View from club level

Events and tenants
| Preceded by Chartiers Valley High School Stadium | Home of the Pittsburgh Riverhounds SC; 2012–present | Succeeded by Current |
| Preceded by J.C. Stone Field | Home of the Pittsburgh Thunderbirds; 2023-present | Succeeded by Current |
| Preceded by First stadium | Home of the Pittsburgh Riveters SC; 2025-present | Succeeded by Current |
