= Pittsburgh Rebellion =

Logo

General information
- Founded: 2017
- Folded: Fall 2017
- Stadium: Highmark Stadium
- Headquartered: Pittsburgh, Pennsylvania
- Colors: Black and gold

Personnel
- Owners: Independent owner (identity unknown)

League / conference affiliations
- Legends Football League; Eastern Conference

The Pittsburgh Rebellion was a women's American football team based in Pittsburgh and a member of the Legends Football League (LFL).

== History ==
The franchise was announced as the twenty-first franchise in the Legends Football League (LFL) in late 2016. The team was a member of the Eastern Conference in the 2017 season and played in Highmark Stadium, an outdoor soccer-specific stadium. Following the season, the Rebellion decided not to play in 2018 in order to find a more suitable venue to host the team's home games. The team also did not return in the 2019 season, but planned a 2020 return before the entire league essentially ceased operations in December 2019.

== Seasons ==
=== 2017 season ===
Date	Opponent	Location	Result	Record
April 21	at Omaha Heart	Ralston Arena	Lost, 6–34	0–1
May 6	vs. Atlanta Steam	Highmark Stadium	Lost, 21–56	0–2
June 10	vs. Omaha Heart	Highmark Stadium	Won, 21–20	1–2
July 8	at Los Angeles Temptation	Citizens Business Bank Arena	Lost, 6–34	1–3
