= Hermann Horner =

Austrian opera singer

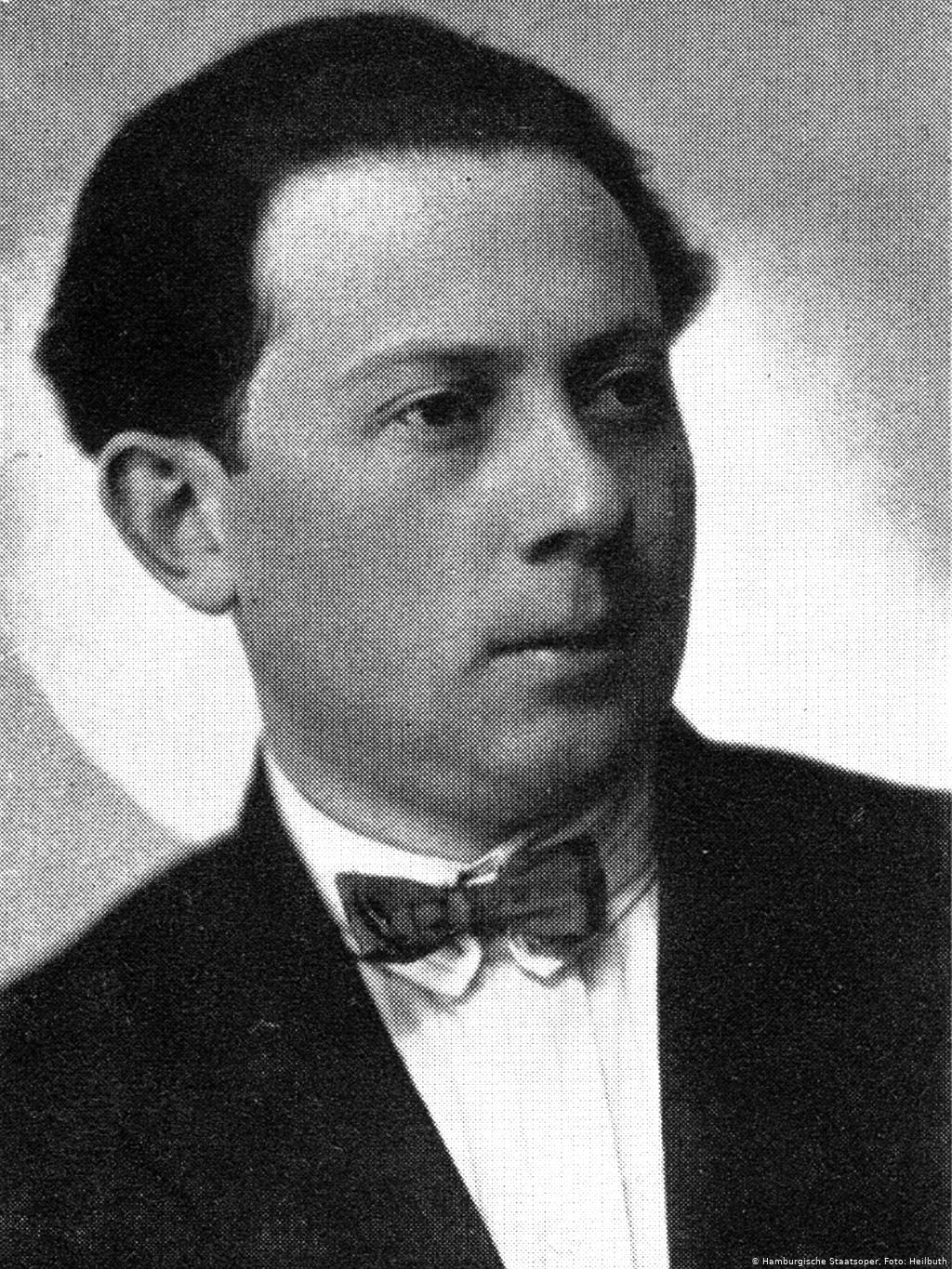
Hermann Horner

Hermann Horner (30 January 1892 – probably in 1942) was an Austrian-Hungarian operatic bass-baritone. He performed on numerous stages in Germany and Czechoslovakia and was a guest at the Bayreuth Festival. He was murdered by the Nazis.

== Life and career ==
Horner was born as the son of a hotel owner in Rzeszów. From 1916 to 1918 he served as a non-commissioned officer in the Austrian army in Montenegro and Albania.

Horner completed his vocal studies in Belgium and made his debut at the Vlaamse Opera in Antwerp. From 1919 to 1923 he was engaged at the City Theatre of Lemberg. This was followed by positions at the Wrocław Opera (1923/24), the Staatsoper Unter den Linden (1924/25), at the Prague State Opera (1925–27), at the Staatstheater Stuttgart (1927–29) and the Staatstheater Nürnberg (1929–33). In Stuttgart, Horner also worked as a singing teacher. One of his students was Gottlob Frick. In 1928 he sang the role of Titurel in Parsifal.

The day of the Nazi boycott of Jewish businesses, two months after the seizure of power by the National Socialists in 1933, the singer was informed that he was no longer allowed to perform with immediate effect. He was suspended from duty with immediate effect. He first went back to Rzeszów and then to Czechoslovakia, where he was engaged for two years (1933–35) at the municipal theatre of Aussig.

Horner was married to Anna, née Koller, who was born in Lwiw in 1892. The couple had at least three children, all born in Stuttgart: Mario (born 1925 or 1926), Eva (also Ewa, born 1930) and Ludwig (also Ludvik, born in 1931 or 1932).

The whole family was murdered. According to Danny Newman, an in-laws relative, Horner was shot along with his younger son while trying to protect his son from the Nazis who murdered the other family members in a gas truck.

Horner died in the Ghetto Reichshof or in the Belzec extermination camp.

== Repertoire ==
The list of roles was created based on Kutsch/Riemens and the Vox recording book.

Beethoven:

- Rocco in Fidelio

Flotow:

- Plumkett in Martha

Halévy:

- Kardinal in La Juive

Mozart:

- Leporello ii Don Giovanni
- Sarastro in The Magic Flute

Nicolai:

- Falstaff in The Merry Wives of Windsor

Offenbach:

- Vier Dämonen in The Tales of Hoffmann

Pfitzner:

- Herzog in Das Herz

Smetana:

- Kezal in The Bartered Bride

Verdi:

- Procida in Les vêpres siciliennes
- Sparafucile in Rigoletto
- Pater Guardian in La forza del destino

Weber:

- Kaspar and Eremit in Der Freischütz

Wagner:

- Landgraf in Tannhäuser
- König Heinrich in Lohengrin
- Titurel in Parsifal

Wolf-Ferrari:

- Don Alvaro in La vedova scaltra

== Recording ==
Horner's voice has been handed down through vox recordings from 1923, he sang arias of the Landgrave and King Henry (from Tannhäuser and Lohengrin), as well as the Porterlied of Plumkett from the opera Martha and the Trinklied of Falstaff from the opera The Merry Wives of Windsor.

== Memorial ==
His name can be found on a commemorative plaque for Nazi victims in the Staatstheater Stuttgart, which was unveiled on April 7, 2016 by Minister Theresia Bauer together with the director of the Staatstheater.
