= Tim Carter (soccer) =

Tim Carter is a name associated with various professionals in different

Personal information
- Place of birth: Maine

Managerial career
- Years: Team
- c. 1979: Bowdoin Polar Bears (assistant)
- 1980–1982: Eckerd Tritons
- 1983: Duke Blue Devils (assistant)
- 1984–1994: Illinois State Redbirds
- 2002: Pittsburgh Riverhounds (assistant)
- 2002–2003: Pittsburgh Riverhounds
- 2003–?: Minnesota Thunder (assistant)
- 2004–2016: Shattuck-Saint Mary's
- 2016–2020: Minnesota United FC (academy director)

Tim Carter is an American association football manager specializing in youth development. He served as director and head coach of the academy at Shattuck-Saint Mary's from 2005 to 2016 and as director of Minnesota United FC's academy from 2016 to 2020. He worked for the U.S. Soccer Federation from 1996 to 2002, starting as a staff coach before becoming the director of youth development. He has also worked as a head coach for several clubs, most notably for Pittsburgh Riverhounds from 2002 to 2003.

== Career ==
After graduating from the University of Southern Maine in 1979, Carter became an assistant coach for the Bowdoin Polar Bears men's soccer team. From 1980 to 1982, he was the men's soccer head coach for the Eckerd Tritons. In 1983, he served as an assistant coach for the Duke Blue Devils. He accepted a head coach position for the Illinois State Redbirds in 1984. He was also a state coach for the Illinois Youth Soccer Association. He remained with the Redbirds through the 1994 season, after which Illinois State suspended their men's soccer program.

In 1996, he became a national staff coach for U.S. Soccer Federation. In 1999, he became U.S. Soccer's Director of Youth Development, and worked on the development of Project 2010. He served in this role until 2002.

Carter worked as Chicago Fire SC's director of youth development from 2001 to 2002. In 2002, he joined the Pittsburgh Riverhounds as an assistant coach and the director of youth development. After the head coach Kai Haaskivi left the club on July 8, 2002, Carter became the club's interim head coach, before being made a permanent coach on September 5, 2002. Carter was replaced by defender Ricardo Iribarren on July 11, 2003, ending his term with a 10–11–5 record.

In 2003, Carter moved to Minnesota to take a position with the coaching staff of Minnesota Thunder. In 2004, Carter was recruited to serve as director of soccer for Shattuck-Saint Mary's, a boarding school in Faribault, Minnesota. The school's U18 Development Academy commenced the following year with Carter as the head coach. The academy was accepted into the U.S. Soccer Development Academy program in 2010.

On September 8, 2016, Minnesota United FC announced that they had hired Carter to become the director of their new development academy as the club transitioned up to Major League Soccer. Under Carter's direction, Minnesota's academy employs a coaching wheel system, wherein coaches are involved not just with their own team, but with the teams above and below theirs within the academy. In June 2020, amidst the COVID-19 pandemic putting a stop to sports, Minnesota United laid off its entire academy staff, including Carter.

== Managerial statistics ==
As of 2023

Managerial record by team and tenure
Team	From	To	Record				
Team	From	To	P	W	D	L	Win %
Eckerd Tritons	1980	1982	50	25	22	3	50.0
Illinois State Redbirds	1984	1994	219	111	89	19	50.7
Pittsburgh Riverhounds	July 8, 2002	July 11, 2003	26	10	11	5	38.5
Total			295	146	122	27	49.5
