= Jack Horner =

Jack Horner may refer to:

- "Little Jack Horner", a nursery rhyme

== People ==
- Jack Horner (activist) (1922–2010), Australian author and activist in the Aboriginal-Australian Fellowship
- Jack Horner (baseball) (1863–1910), American professional baseball player
- Jack Horner (journalist) (1912–2005), Minnesota sportscaster
- Jack Horner (paleontologist) (born 1946), American paleontologist
- Jack Horner (politician) (1927–2004), member of the Canadian House of Commons
- Jack B. Horner (1922–2009), Pennsylvania politician

== Fictional characters ==
- the title character of "Little Jack Horner", a nursery rhyme
- "Big" Jack Horner, the main antagonist of the animated film Puss in Boots: The Last Wish
- Jack Horner, the porn director in the 1997 film Boogie Nights
- Jack Horner (comics), from the comic book Fables

== Animals ==
- Jack Horner (racehorse) (born 1917), 1926 Grand National winning horse

== See also ==
- John Horner (disambiguation)
