= John Horner =

John Horner may refer to:

== People ==
- John Francis Fortescue Horner (1842–1927), British barrister
- John M. Horner (1821–1907), founder of Union City, California
- John R. Horner (born 1946), American paleontologist
- John S. Horner (1802–1883), American politician
- John Horner (British politician) (1911–1997), British firefighter, trade unionist and politician
- John Horner (organist) (1899–1973), organist, choirmaster and music teacher in South Australia
- John Horner (police officer), American chief of police of Los Angeles in 1885
- John Horner (Rector of Lincoln College, Oxford) (1792–?), Oxford college head
- Jack Horner (1927–2004), Canadian rancher, politician and cabinet minister

== Fictional characters ==
- John Horner, in "The Adventure of the Blue Carbuncle", a Sherlock Holmes story by Sir Arthur Conan Doyle

== See also ==
- Jack Horner (disambiguation)
- Johan Hörner (1711–1763), Swedish-born Danish painter
- Johann Caspar Horner (1774–1834), Swiss physicist and astronomer
- Johann Friedrich Horner (1831–1886), ophthalmologist
