= General Horner =

General Horner may refer to:

- Charles T. Horner Jr. (1916–1992), U.S. Army major general
- Chuck Horner (born 1936), U.S. Air Force four-star general
- Matthew C. Horner (1901–1972), U.S. Marine Corps major general
