= George Horner =

George Horner is the name of:

- George Horner (died 1677) (1605–1677), English MP for Somerset
- George Horner (died 1707) (1646–1707), English MP for Somerset - son of above
- Red Horner (George Reginald Horner, 1909–2005), Canadian ice hockey player
- George William Horner (1849–1930), translator of Coptic versions of the Bible
- George Horner (musician) (1923–2015), pianist at Terezin concentration camp

== See also ==
- William George Horner (1786–1837), British mathematician
