= Dave Brandt =

American soccer coach

Personal information
- Birth name: David Brandt
- Place of birth: Mechanicsburg, Pennsylvania, U.S.

College career
Years	Team	Apps	(Gls)
1981–1984	Messiah Falcons		

Managerial career
- 1988–1996: Messiah Falcons (assistant)
- 1997–2008: Messiah Falcons
- 2009–2015: Navy Midshipmen
- 2016–2017: Pittsburgh Riverhounds
- 2018–2021: Hope College
- 2022–: Bucknell Bison

David Brandt is an American soccer coach who is currently the head coach of the Bucknell Bison.

== Playing career ==
Brandt played college soccer for Messiah College between 1981 and 1984.

== Coaching career ==
=== Collegiate ===
Brandt coached his alma mater Messiah College from 1997 to 2008. During that time, the team compiled a 246-25-14 record for a .888 win percentage. The team won six NCAA Division III National Championships. His win percentage and 52 postseason wins are both Division III records. In 2005, his team compiled a 24-0-0 record, becoming one of only five teams to have an undefeated season at any level of the NCAA since 1976. Previously Brandt was an assistant coach of the team from 1988 to 1996.

Brandt left Messiah College in 2009 to coach the Navy Midshipmen until 2015. Over that time, he earned numerous team and conference records and awards including for win streak records, ranking in the top 25 in the nation, reaching the 2nd round of the national championships, being named Patriot League Coach of the Year and NSCAA Mid-Atlantic Region Coach of the Year.

In December 2021 Brandt was announced as the head coach of the Bucknell Bison.

=== Professional ===
Brandt was named head coach of the Pittsburgh Riverhounds of the USL on May 22, 2016, replacing recently released Mark Steffens.

== Personal ==
Brandt's hometown is Mechanicsburg, Pennsylvania. He is an alumnus of Messiah College and Temple University. He is married with two children.
