= Gene Klein (soccer) =

American soccer coach

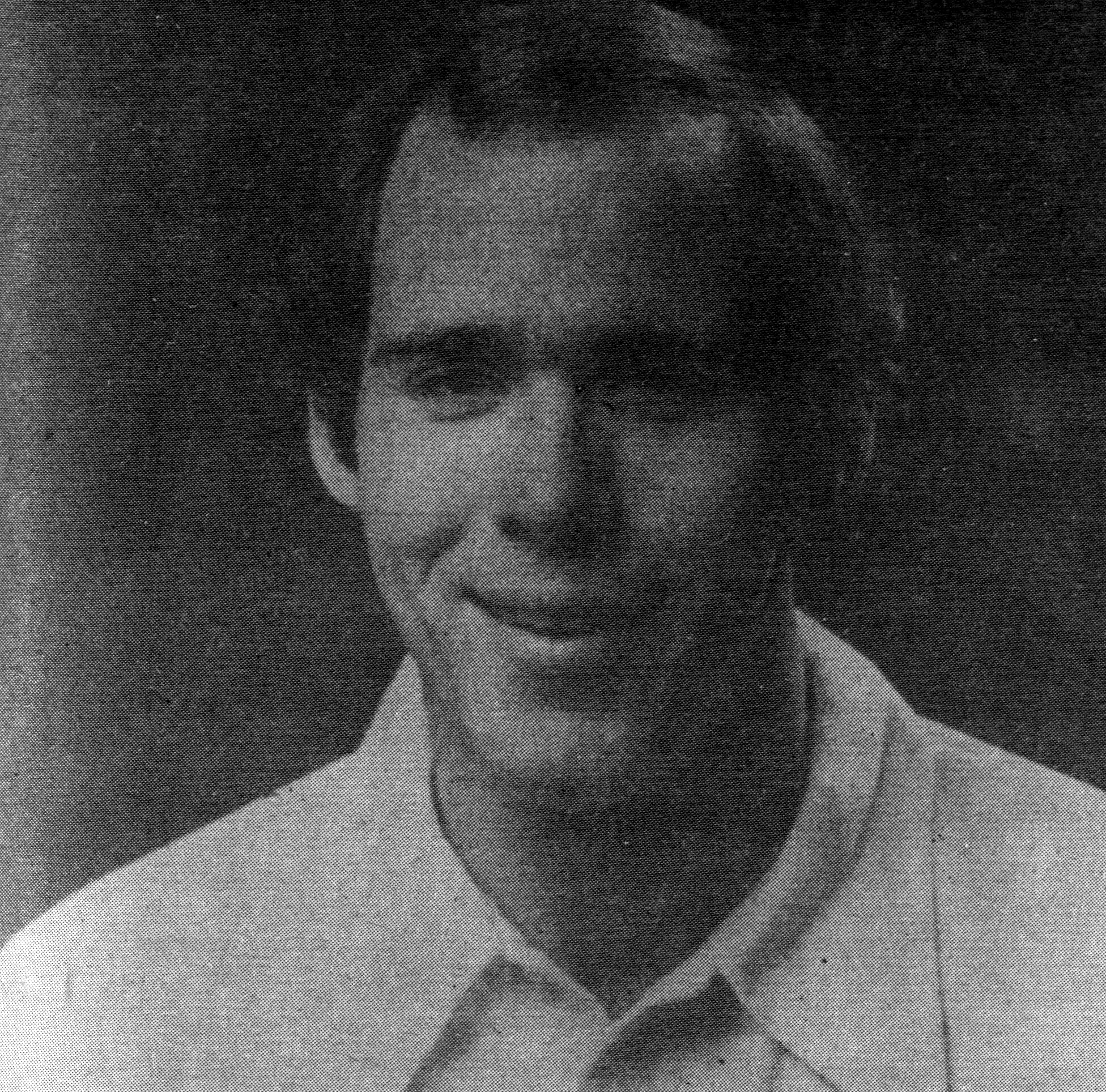
- Klein circa 1980

Personal information
- Date of birth: July 8, 1952
- Place of birth: Bridgeville, Pennsylvania, U.S.
- Date of death: July 24, 2023 (aged 71)
- Height: 6 ft 2 in (1.88 m)
- Position: Goalkeeper

College career
Years	Team	Apps	(Gls)
?–1974	Pittsburgh Panthers		

Senior career*
Years	Team	Apps	(Gls)
c. 1971–?	Pittsburgh Beadling		

Managerial career
- 1976: Bethel Park High School (assistant)
- 1977–1981: Carnegie Mellon Tartans
- 1981–2005: Quaker Valley High School
- 1999–?: Pittsburgh Riverhounds (assistant)
- 2005–2010: Pittsburgh Riverhounds
- 2010–2015: Quaker Valley High School
- * Club domestic league appearances and goals

Gene Klein (1952–2023) was an American soccer coach. He served as the head coach of the Pittsburgh Riverhounds from 2005 to 2010 and as head coach at Quaker Valley High School from 1981 to 2005 and 2010 to 2015.

== Early life ==
Gene Klein, a native of Bridgeville, Pennsylvania, was born on July 8, 1952. In 1970, he graduated from Chartiers Valley High School in Bridgeville. At age 16, his friends convinced him to try out goalkeeping, and he began playing for Pittsburgh Beadling circa 1971. He was with the club for at least six years.

Klein attended the University of Pittsburgh, where he played for the Pittsburgh Panthers men's soccer team. He graduated in 1974 with a degree in history.

== Coaching career ==
Klein was an assistant soccer coach at Bethel Park High School in 1976. Klein was named head coach of the Carnegie Mellon Tartans men's soccer team in September 1977. He remained at Carnegie Mellon for four seasons. He was also named coach of the Carnegie Mellon women's basketball team for the 1980–81 season.

In 1981, he became the head coach of Quaker Valley High School in Leetsdale, Pennsylvania, in the second year of existence for Quaker Valley's soccer program. At the time he was hired, Klein said he had been "disappointed" with the progress of the Carnegie Mellon soccer program, and thus had sought out the Quaker Valley job.

In 1983, Klein and Joe Luxbacher, his former teammate on the Pittsburgh Panthers, co-wrote the book The Soccer Goalkeeper: A Guide for Players and Coaches.

In 1996, his Quaker Valley team went undefeated; this team was inducted into the Western Pennsylvania Interscholastic Athletic League (WPIAL) Hall of Fame in 2013.

In 1999, Klein was hired as an assistant on the coaching staff of Pittsburgh Riverhounds in the club's inaugural season, while also retaining his position at Quaker Valley. On December 15, 2005, he was named as the Riverhounds head coach, replacing Ricardo Iribarren after the club finished with a 6–11–3 record for the 2005 season. With this head coach appointment, he left his position at Quaker Valley. The Riverhounds replaced Klein with Justin Evans on January 11, 2010. After his three seasons with the Riverhounds (the team was on hiatus in 2007), his win-loss-draw record stood at 19–31–16.

He returned to coaching Quaker Valley High School in 2011. On October 2, 2014, Klein won his 500th game for the school. His coaching tenure at Quaker Valley ended in 2015. At the end of his 29-year career with the school, his win-loss-draw record stood at 505–139–38. He was named to the WPIAL Hall of Fame in 2020.

From 2014 to 2019, Klein and coaching colleague Paul Child were the Riverhounds' broadcast commentators. In September 2022, Klein was named to the Riverhounds SC Hall of Fame.

== Death ==
Gene Klein died on July 24, 2023, after a battle with brain cancer. He was 71 years old.

== Statistics ==
Managerial record by team and tenure
Team	Dates	Record				
Team	Dates	P	W	D	L	Win %
Quaker Valley High School	1981–2005, 2010–2015	682	505	139	38	74.0
Pittsburgh Riverhounds	December 15, 2005 – January 11, 2010	66	19	31	16	28.8
Total		748	524	170	54	70.1
