= Quaker Valley High School =

Public high school in Leetsdale, Pennsylvania

Coordinates: 40.56083°N 80.20333°W

- 625 Beaver St., Leetsdale, PA 15056

Information
- Type: Public
- Established: 1956
- School district: Quaker Valley School District
- Principal: Deborah Riccobelli
- Staff: 55.80 (FTE)
- Grades: 9–12
- Student to teacher ratio: 10.47
- Color
- Information: (412) 749-6000
- Website: https://www.qvsd.org/

Quaker Valley High School is a high school located in Leetsdale, Pennsylvania. The school is one of the four National Blue Ribbon Schools that comprise the Quaker Valley School District. The school teaches an average of 645 students in grades 9 through 12, and offers a college-preparatory core curriculum with elective courses.

Quaker Valley High School offers three College-in-High-School courses through the University of Pittsburgh and has an active dual enrollment partnership with Community College of Allegheny County, Robert Morris University, the Art Institute of Pittsburgh, and Penn State Beaver. The Dual Enrollment program is facilitated by the Office of Collegiate Affairs.

As a highlight of the academic program, the Personal Project/Honors Personal Project, completed during the sophomore year, fulfills a graduation requirement and provides students with the opportunity to work over several months in an area of personal interest with an adult mentor. Students pursue topics as diverse as their personalities and talents. This research experience results in a final product, a presentation to a faculty panel, and a paper reflecting on the learning process.]

== Athletics ==
=== Athletic Training/Physical Therapy Services ===
Quaker Valley School District contracts athletic training and physical therapy services to Greater Pittsburgh Rehab and Sports Medicine Associates. Athletes are under the direct supervision of a certified athletic trainer. Athletes who must have extended rehabilitative services provided to them are referred through the athletic trainer to the GPOA network of physicians.

=== Interscholastic Athletic Program ===
Girls: Basketball: Varsity, JV, 7/8; Crew: Club; Cross Country: Varsity, 7/8; Golf: Varsity; Lacrosse: Varsity, JV; Soccer: Varsity, JV, 7/8; Softball: Varsity, JV; Swimming: Varsity; Tennis: Varsity; Track: Varsity, 7/8; Volleyball: Varsity, JV, 7/8; Bowling: Varsity, JV

Boys: Baseball: Varsity; Basketball: Varsity, JV, 9th, 7/8; Bowling: Varsity, JV; Cross Country: Varsity; Football: Varsity, JV, 7/8; Golf: Varsity; Ice Hockey: Club; Lacrosse: Varsity, JV; Soccer: Varsity, JV, 7/8; Swimming: Varsity; Tennis: Varsity; Track: Varsity, 7/8; Wrestling: Varsity, 7/8

== Collegiate Affairs ==
The Office of Collegiate Affairs at Quaker Valley High School is responsible for assisting students with their college search, application and selection process, their SAT and ACT preparation, scholarship search and financial aid process. Since 90% of Quaker Valley students attend a two or four-year college, most students utilize the resources this office has to offer. Working in conjunction with the guidance counselors and academic specialist, the Director of Collegiate Affairs begins working with students in the fall of the junior year.

Also, the Office of Collegiate Affairs oversees visits from college admission counselors and military personnel, letters of recommendation from faculty, and the dual enrollment program with four partners: Penn State Beaver, Robert Morris University, The Art Institute, and Community College of Allegheny County.

== Global Scholars Initiative ==
The Global Scholars Initiative stems from a collaborative partnership with the University of Pittsburgh University Center for International Studies (UCIS). The goal of the initiative is to provide students with an educational program that is relevant in the modern world. Coursework places special emphasis on the skills needed for future success such as information and media literacy, multi-faceted communications, collaborative problem solving, technology integration, and the ability to apply creativity, innovation, and higher-level thinking across multiple disciplines.

== Guidance Services ==
The QVHS Guidance department has been recognized as a model program (RAMP) by the American School Counseling Association (ASCA). The department is made up of two school counselors who pride themselves in focusing on the individual needs of every student and family. Counselors work with students individually and in small and large groups for academic planning, goal setting, personal/social development, and career exploration.

== Music and Performing Arts ==
The Quaker Valley Music Department claims to be a recipient of the "Top 100 Communities for Music Education" award. The music program offers the following performance ensembles: Marching Band, Symphonic Band, Jazz Ensemble, String Orchestra, Symphony Orchestra, Concert Choir, Chamber Singers, and male and female Barbershop Quartets. Classes include Music Theory, Music in Pop Culture.

Quaker Valley High School's performing ensembles consistently receive Excellent and Superior ratings at Pennsylvania Music Educators Association Adjudication festivals and win awards for competitions in Florida, Ohio, Virginia, and Toronto. Also, these groups regularly offer their talents to a variety of civic events. On average, 40% of the high school student body participates in one or more of the performing ensembles.

Each spring the high school Music and Drama Departments produce a full-scale Broadway musical. Over 50 students participate on stage or behind the scenes building sets, assembling costumes, or hanging lights. The high school has staged a wide range of shows, the most recent being Alice By Heart, My Fair Lady, The Addams Family, and Anything Goes. Quaker Valley musicals have won numerous Gene Kelly Awards along the way (the Tony Awards of area high schools), winning the best musical for Guys and Dolls in 2012.

Students who excel in the Music Department qualify for membership in the Quaker Valley Chapter of the Tri-M National Music Honor Society. The Society recognizes students’ academic and musical achievements and provides a venue for community service in the arts. One of the membership requirements is participation in a student solo recital in front of family, peers, and teachers.

== Recognition ==
The 2017 Pittsburgh Business Times Guide to Western Pennsylvania Schools ranked Quaker Valley School District 8th out of 105 public school districts in western Pennsylvania and 37th out of 497 school districts in Pennsylvania. The ranking is based on a formula developed by the Business Times using three years of math and reading test scores.

In 2010, Newsweek Magazine designated Quaker Valley High School as one of America's Top Public High Schools for the sixth consecutive year. Quaker Valley ranks 994 with an index of 1.598, placing it among the top six percent of high schools nationwide.

== Technological & Literary Resources ==
Each student is loaned an iPad for schoolwork. QVHS offers courses in computer science, networking, digital art, technology education, and web design. Technology Education courses feature Computer Assisted Drafting and Design (CADD) and hands-on construction courses.

Most classrooms are equipped with multi-media projectors, electronic whiteboards, VCR/DVD players, and cable television.

Quaker Valley High School's library provides students and teachers with access to digital media and research tools, as well as e-books and access to informational databases for use in the classroom. The library has over 13,000 print and digital resources as well as a collection of magazines, newspapers, and multi-media resources for students and teachers.

In the 2021-2022 academic year, Quaker Valley High School hosted AP Gaming, a high level computer science class, taught by Dr Darren Mariano.

== Visual Arts ==
The visual arts department at Quaker Valley High School offers a curriculum of both traditional fine arts courses and digital offerings. The visual arts are offered as elective courses ranging from beginning levels for 9th graders to AP Studio art in 12th grade. The visual arts programs allow students to learn techniques such as drawing, page layout, oil painting, screen printing, metals and jewelry, and Adobe Photoshop.

== Notable alumni ==
- Dan Cortese – Actor
- Josh Green – Governor of Hawaii
- Chuck Hittinger – Actor
- Chuck Knox, Former NFL Head Coach
- Wentworth Miller – (Senior year only) actor
- Keith Starr – Former NBA Player for the Chicago Bulls
- Adou Thiero - basketball player
