= Ben Horner =

American soccer player

Personal information
- Full name: Benjamin Horner
- Date of birth: May 10, 1989 (age 37)
- Place of birth: Butler, Pennsylvania, United States
- Height: 5 ft 10 in (1.78 m)
- Position: Midfielder

Youth career
- 2007–2010: Duquesne Dukes

Senior career*
Years	Team	Apps	(Gls)
2011–2012	Pittsburgh Riverhounds	25	(1)
- * Club domestic league appearances and goals as of July 21, 2012

Ben Horner (born May 10, 1989, in Butler, Pennsylvania) is an American soccer player.

== Career ==
=== College and amateur ===
Horner attended Butler High School and played four years of college soccer at the Duquesne University. He led the Dukes in goals, points and game-winning goals in his sophomore college year in 2008, and was a NSCAA Scholar All-East Region Honorable Mention, an ESPN The Magazine Academic All-District selection, and an Atlantic 10 Academic All-Conference selection as a junior in 2009.

=== Professional ===
Undrafted out of college, Horner turned professional in 2011 when he signed for the Pittsburgh Riverhounds of the USL Professional Division. He made his professional debut, and scored his first professional goal, on April 9, 2011, in a game against Richmond Kickers.
