= William Horner (cricketer) =

English cricketer

Personal information
- Full name: William Horner
- Born: 1830; Liverpool, Lancashire, England
- Died: 1905 (aged 74/75); Conwy, Caernarfonshire, Wales
- Batting: Unknown

Career statistics
| Competition | First-class |
|---|---|
| Matches | 4 |
| Runs scored | 64 |
| Batting average | 8.00 |
| 100s/50s | –/– |
| Top score | 18 |
| Catches/stumpings | –/– |
- Source: Cricinfo, 15 November 2019

William Horner (baptised 17 October 1830 – 1905) was an English first-class cricketer.

Horner was born at Liverpool in 1830 and educated at Repton School.

He played first-class cricket on four occasions for the Gentlemen of the North, making his first-class debut against the Gentlemen of the South at The Oval in 1858, with his three further first-class appearances in 1858–59 all coming against the Gentlemen of the South. Across his four first-class matches, Horner scored 64 runs with a high score of 18.

Below first-class he played at county level for the Lancashire Gentlemen, for Cheshire while playing at club level for Birkenhead Park, and made one appearance for Shropshire in 1865 without scoring any runs or taking a wicket.

He died at Conwy in Wales in 1905.
