= Senator Horner =

Senator Horner may refer to:

- Maxine Horner (1933–2021), Oklahoma State Senate
- Rick Horner (born 1957), North Carolina State Senate
