= Justin Evans (soccer) =

American soccer player and coach

Personal information
- Date of birth: January 31, 1977 (age 49)
- Place of birth: Peters Township, Pennsylvania, United States
- Height: 6 ft 1 in (1.85 m)
- Position: Defensive midfielder

Youth career
- 1995–1997: Penn State Nittany Lions
- 1998: St. Bonaventure Bonnies

Senior career*
Years	Team	Apps	(Gls)
1999	Pittsburgh Riverhounds	28	(5)
1999	Petro Płock	4	(1)
2000	San Jose Earthquakes	13	(0)
2000	Pittsburgh Riverhounds	14	(2)
2000	→ Chicago Fire (loan)	2	(0)
2000–2001	Lechia Gdańsk	8	(0)
2001	Chicago Fire	6	(0)
2001	→ Pittsburgh Riverhounds (loan)	1	(0)
2001	Dallas Burn	9	(0)
2001–2004	Cleveland Force (indoor)	85	(41)
2002	Charleston Battery	29	(4)
2003	Pittsburgh Riverhounds	25	(2)
2004–2005	Charleston Battery	59	(1)
2004	→ Northern Virginia Royals (loan)	1	(0)
2004–2005	Kansas City Comets (indoor)	32	(12)
2005–2006	Chicago Storm (indoor)	2	(0)
2008–2009	Pittsburgh Riverhounds	33	(5)
Total		351	(73)

Managerial career
- 2008–2009: Pittsburgh Riverhounds (assistant)
- 2010–2014: Pittsburgh Riverhounds
- * Club domestic league appearances and goals

Justin Evans (born January 31, 1977) is an American soccer coach and former professional player.

== Playing career ==
=== Professional ===
After graduating from college, Evans signed for the newly formed Pittsburgh Riverhounds in 1999, becoming the team's #1 draft pick and first player. He also spent time that season in Poland playing in the first division for Petro Płock. In February 2000, the San Jose Earthquakes selected Evans in the second round of the 2000 MLS SuperDraft. The Earthquakes released him mid-season and Evans returned to the Riverhounds. However, he was called up to the Chicago Fire for several games that season. In the Autumn of 2000 Evans moved to Lechia Gdańsk, playing a total of 8 games during his spell. In February 2001, he returned to America when the Fire then drafted Evans in the 2001 MLS SuperDraft. He played five games for the Fire and one game on loan to the Riverhounds before trading him to the Dallas Burn on July 1, 2001, for future considerations. Evans signed for the Charleston Battery for the 2002 season, making 29 league appearances. After playing in Poland, Evans re-signed with the Battery for the 2004 and 2005 seasons, making a total of 59 league appearances. Evans re-signed with hometown club Pittsburgh Riverhounds for the 2008 season.

=== Indoor Soccer ===
Evans has also played indoor soccer, playing with the Cleveland Force (2001–2004) and Kansas City Comets between 2004 and 2005. Evans retired from professional soccer at the end of the 2009 season.

== Coaching career ==
Evans was hired as the head coach of the Pittsburgh Riverhounds on January 11, 2010, and served in that capacity until May 19, 2014.
