= Jason Kutney =

American soccer player (born 1981)

Personal information
- Full name: Jason Kutney
- Date of birth: September 5, 1981 (age 45)
- Place of birth: Freehold Borough, New Jersey, United States
- Height: 6 ft 0 in (1.83 m)
- Position: Midfielder

Youth career
- 2000–2003: Duquesne Dukes

Senior career*
| Years | Team | Apps | (Gls) |
| 2003 | Jersey Shore Boca | 10 | (0) |
| 2004–2005 | Charleston Battery | 38 | (2) |
| 2006 | Pittsburgh Riverhounds | 18 | (3) |
| 2008–2013 | Pittsburgh Riverhounds | 75 | (3) |
- * Club domestic league appearances and goals as of July 21, 2012

Jason Kutney (born September 5, 1981, in Freehold Borough, New Jersey) is an American soccer player who formerly played for the Pittsburgh Riverhounds in the USL Professional Division.

== Career ==
=== College and amateur ===
Raised in Freehold Borough, New Jersey, Kutney graduated from Freehold High School in 2000 and played college soccer for the Duquesne Dukes men's soccer team from 2000 to 2003, where he was a 2002-2004 COSIDA-Verizon Academic All-American, a 2003-2004 adidas All-American (Atlantic Region 1st Team), Duquesne's Male Athlete of the Year in 2003–2004, and graduated with a degree in Finance and Investment Management.

During his college years he also played with Jersey Shore Boca in the USL Premier Development League.

=== Professional ===
Kutney turned professional in 2004 when he signed with Charleston Battery, and spent two years in South Carolina before transferring to the Pittsburgh Riverhounds in the USL Second Division.

He returned to the Riverhounds in 2008 after the team's hiatus year not only as a player, but as part of the new ownership group leading pro soccer into the future in Pittsburgh. Kutney additionally serves as the team's Director of Youth Soccer Development.
