= Houston Dynamo records and statistics =

This article is a list of statistics and records relating to Houston Dynamo. The Houston Dynamo is an American professional soccer club based in Houston, Texas. The club was founded in 2006 and plays in Major League Soccer.

This list encompasses the major honors won by Houston Dynamo and records set by the club, their coaches, and their players. The player records section includes details of the club's leading goal scorers and those who have made most appearances in first-team competitions. It also records notable achievements by Houston Dynamo players on the international stage. The club's attendance records at Robertson Stadium are also included in the list.

== Honors ==
Houston Dynamo's first trophy was the Carolina Challenge Cup, a preseason tournament before the 2006 campaign. Houston went on to win the 2006 MLS Cup before duplicating the feat in the 2007 MLS Cup. They returned to the MLS cup in 2011 and 2012, both times Falling to the host Los Angeles Galaxy. In 2015 the Dynamo won they're third Carolina Challenge Cup and two years later won another preseason tournament, The Desert Diamond Cup. The Dynamo have also won two editions of the U.S. Open Cup. The first in 2018 and the most recent in 2023.

=== Domestic ===
- MLS Cup (2) 2006, 2007
  - runners up (2) 2011, 2012
- Supporters Shield
  - runners up(1) 2008
- U.S. Open Cup (2) 2018, 2023

=== Preseason and Friendly Trophies ===
- Dynamo Charities Cup (5):

2009 : 2–1 vs. Monterrey

2010 : 4–0 vs. Águila

2013 : 2–0 vs. Stoke City

2015 : 4–0 vs. Santos Laguna

2016 : 3–3 (5–4p) vs. Real Sociedad

- Carolina Challenge Cup (3): 2006, 2007, 2015
- Texas Pro Soccer Festival (1): 2008
- Desert Diamond Cup (1): 2017

== Player Stats ==
All current players are in bold

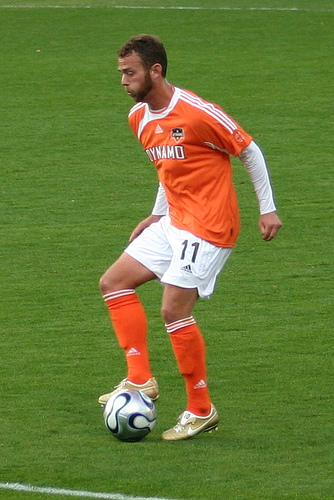
Houston's all-time appearance and assist leader, Brad Davis

=== Most appearances ===
Competitive, professional matches only. MLS Playoffs count as other. Substitutions count as appearances. Correct as of the end of the 2021 season.

No.	Name	Pos.	Years	Total	MLS	Other
1	(United States) Brad Davis	MF	2006–2015	328	271	57
2	(United States) Ricardo Clark	MF	2006–09, 2012–17	304	253	51
3	(Honduras) Boniek García	MF	2012–2021	266	235	31
3	(United States) Corey Ashe	DF	2007–2015	266	211	55
5	(United States) Bobby Boswell	DF	2008–2013	234	177	57
6	(United States) Brian Ching	FW	2006–2013	224	169	55
7	(United States) Will Bruin	FW	2011–2016	203	178	24
8	(United States) Brian Mullan	MF	2006–2010	184	136	48
9	(Canada) Pat Onstad	GK	2006–2010	170	136	34
10	(Colombia) Mauro Manotas	FW	2015–2020	167	149	18

=== Most Goals ===
==== Major League Soccer ====
As of July 12, 2025

No.	Nationality	Name	Years	Goals
1	United States	Brian Ching	2006–2013	56
2	Colombia	Mauro Manotas	2015–2020	51
3	United States	Will Bruin	2011–2016	50
4	United States	Brad Davis	2006–2015	41
5	Honduras	Alberth Elis	2017–2020	34
6	Jamaica	Giles Barnes	2012–2016	31
7	United States	Ricardo Clark	2006–09, 2012–17	28
8	Canada	Dwayne De Rosario	2006–2008	24
9	Paraguay	Sebastián Ferreira	2022–2025	18
9	Haiti	Fafà Picault	2020–2022	18

- Most goals scored in MLS: **56** – Brian Ching, 2006–2013
- Most goals in one MLS season: **19** – Mauro Manotas, 2018
- Most goals scored in one MLS game: **4** – Brian Ching, against Colorado Rapids in 2006.
- Most MLS hat-tricks in one season: **1** – Seven players tied
- Most MLS hat-tricks overall: '2 – Brian Ching.

==== U.S. Open Cup ====
As of July 12, 2025

No.	Nationality	Name	Years	Goals
1	Colombia	Mauro Manotas	2015–2020	10
2	United States	Memo Rodríguez	2015, 2017–2022	4
2	United States	Corey Baird	2021–2024	4
4	Venezuela	Alejandro Moreno	2006	3
4	Ghana	Dominic Oduro	2009–2011	3
4	Nigeria	Ibrahim Aliyu	2023–2025	3
7	United States	Eddie Robinson	2006–2011	2
7	United States	Geoff Cameron	2008–2012	2
7	Jamaica	Giles Barnes	2012–2016	2
7	Argentina	Leonel Miranda	2015–2016	2
7	Brazil	Alex Lima	2015–2017	2
7	Mexico	Aldo Quintanilla	2018	2
7	United States	Andrew Wenger	2016–2018	2
7	Honduras	Romell Quioto	2017–2019	2
7	Argentina	Tomás Martínez	2017–2020	2
7	Venezuela	Ronaldo Peña	2018–2020	2
7	Argentina	Ezequiel Ponce	2024–	2
7	Morocco	Amine Bassi	2023–	2
7	Panama	Adalberto Carrasquilla	2021–2024	2
United States	Griffin Dorsey	2021–	**2**	

- Most goals scored in U.S. Open Cup: '10 – Mauro Manotas, 2015–2020
- Most goals scored in one Open Cup game: **3** – Corey Baird, against Minnesota United in 2023

==== Hat-tricks ====
Date	Player	Goals	Opponent	Result*	Competition	Ref
April 2, 2006	(United States) Brian Ching	4	Colorado Rapids	5–2	MLS	
June 21, 2007	(United States) Brad Davis	3	Chivas USA	4–0	MLS	
September 8, 2007	(United States) Nate Jaqua	3	Real Salt Lake	4–3	MLS	
August 21, 2010	(United States) Brian Ching	3	Chicago Fire	4–3	MLS	
April 29, 2011	(United States) Will Bruin	3	D.C. United	4–1	MLS	
September 24, 2016	(Colombia) Mauro Manotas	3	Portland Timbers	3–1	MLS	
April 1, 2017	(Mexico) Erick Torres	3	New York Red Bulls	4–1	MLS	
May 23, 2023	(United States) Corey Baird	3	Minnesota United	4–0	U.S. Open Cup	
June 22, 2024	(Paraguay) Sebastián Ferreira	3	D.C. United	4–1	MLS	

*Dynamo goals listed first.

=== Most Assists ===
Competitive, professional matches only. Current as of July 12, 2025.

No.	Name	Pos.	Years	Total	MLS	Other
1	(United States) Brad Davis	MF	2006–2015	120	104	16
2	(Honduras) Boniek Garcia	MF	2012–2021	41	39	2
3	(Honduras) Alberth Elis	FW	2017–2020	31	27	4
4	(United States) Brian Ching	FW	2006–2012	30	22	8
5	(United States) Brian Mullan	MF	2006–2010	29	19	10
6	(United States) Corey Ashe	DF	2007–2015	27	18	9
7	(United States) Ricardo Clark	MF	2006–09,2012–17	25	23	2
8	(United States) Will Bruin	FW	2011–2016	21	20	1
8	(Canada) Dwayne De Rosario	FW	2006–2008	21	11	10
8	(Mexico) Héctor Herrera	MF	2022–2024	21	17	4

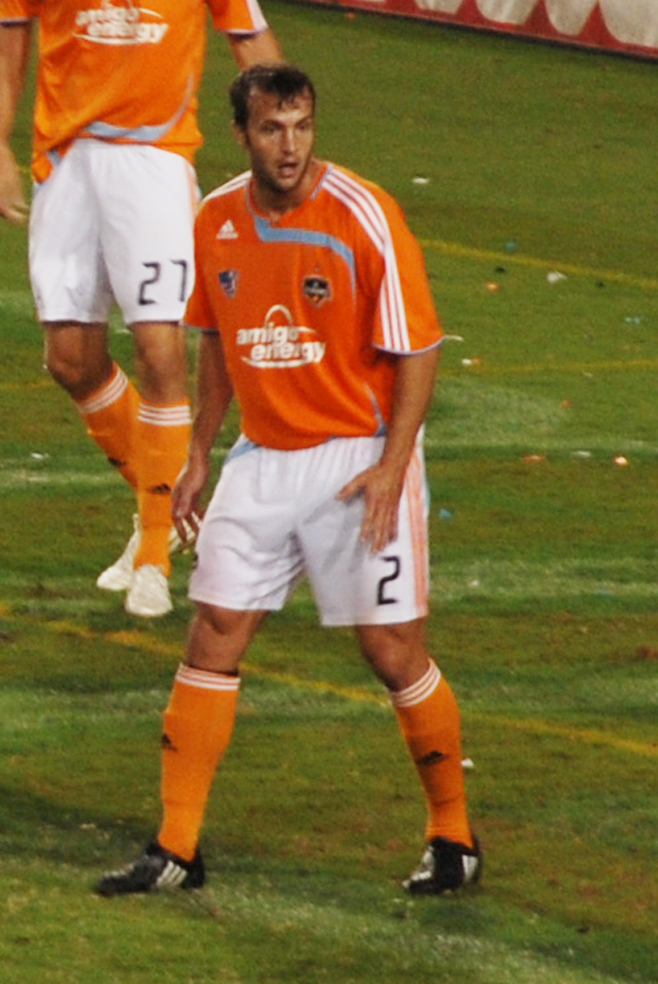
Eddie Robinson has been sent off the most times in club history

=== Most Yellow Cards ===
Competitive, professional matches only. Current as of July 12, 2025.

No.	Name	Pos.	Years	Total	MLS	Others
1	(United States) Ricardo Clark	MF	2006–2009,2012–2017	46	38	8
1	(Honduras) Boniek Garcia	MF	2012–2021	46	36	10
3	(United States) Eddie Robinson	DF	2006–2011	42	31	11
4	(United States) Bobby Boswell	DF	2008–2013	39	31	8
5	(United States) Brad Davis	MF	2006–2015	36	28	8
6	(United States) Griffin Dorsey	DF	2021–Present	35	29	6
7	(Argentina) Franco Escobar	DF	2023–Present	34	25	9
8	(United States) Brian Mullan	MF	2006–2010	31	16	15
9	(United States) Kofi Sarkodie	DF	2011–2015	29	19	10
10	(Argentina) Matías Vera	MF	2019–2024	28	25	3
10	(Panama) Adalberto Carrasquilla	MF	2021–2024	28	24	4

=== Most Red Cards ===
Competitive, professional matches only. Current as of July 12, 2025.

No.	Name	Pos.	Years	Total	MLS	Others
1	(United States) Eddie Robinson	DF	2006–2011	6	4	2
2	(United States) Ricardo Clark	MF	2006–2009,2012–2017	3	3	0
2	(Jamaica) Lovel Palmer	DF	2010–2011	3	3	0
2	(United States) Brian Ching	FW	2006–2012	3	3	0
2	(United States) Brad Davis	MF	2006–2015	3	3	0
2	(United States) Kofi Sarkodie	DF	2011–2015	3	3	0
2	(Honduras) Alberth Elis	FW	2017–2020	3	3	0
2	(El Salvador) Darwin Cerén	MF	2017–2022	3	3	0
2	(Mexico) Héctor Herrera	MF	2022–2024	3	2	1
2	(United States) Tyler Deric	GK	2009–2019	3	2	1
2	(Canada) Dwayne De Rosario	FW	2006–2008	3	2	1

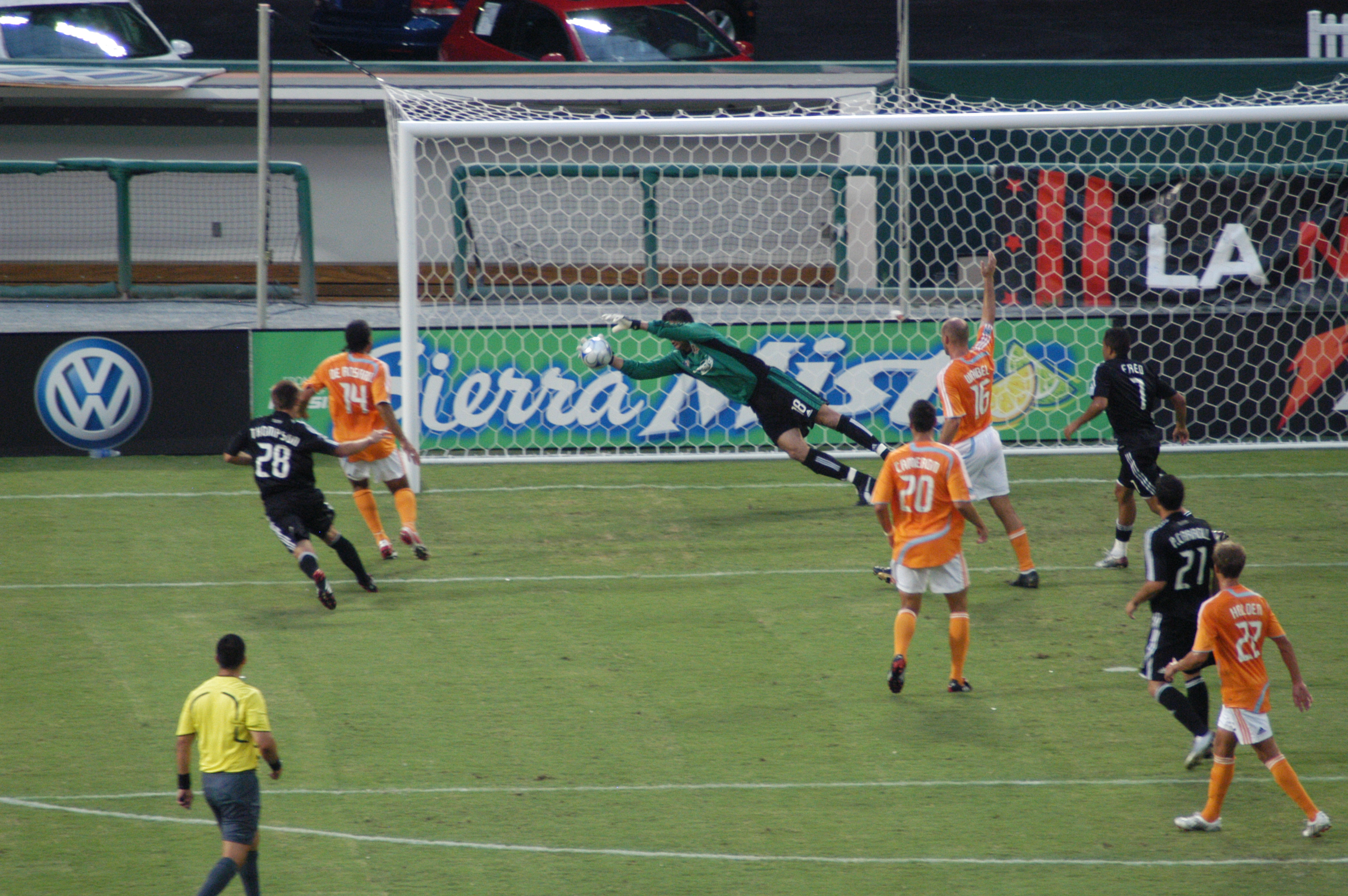
Pat Onstad leads the club in all major goalkeeping stats

=== Goalkeeping ===
MLS regular season matches only. Current as of July 12, 2025.

No.	Name	Years	Shutouts	Apps	Saves	Goals Allowed
1	(Canada) Pat Onstad	2005–2010	37	136	384	155
2	(United States) Tally Hall	2009–2014	35	130	367	173
3	(United States) Steve Clark	2022–2024	28	99	300	126
4	(United States) Joe Willis	2015–2019	25	108	281	144
5	(United States) Tyler Deric	2009–2019	21	90	273	120
6	(Croatia) Marko Marić	2020–2021	6	45	148	74
7	(England) Jonathan Bond	2025–Present	5	13	32	22
8	(England) Tony Caig	2008	3	7	24	8
9	(United States) Andrew Tarbell	2023–Present	2	9	16	12
9	(United States) Blake Gillingham	2025–Present	2	4	11	4
9	(United States) Michael Nelson	2018–2022	2	13	31	18
9	(United States) Zach Wells	2006–2007	2	4	8	1
13	(United States) Chris Seitz	2018	1	6	14	9

== Coaching records ==
All statistics are correct as of February 18, 2022.

- First full-time head coach: Dominic Kinnear.
- Longest spell as head coach: Dominic Kinnear (managed the club for 288 league matches from April 2006 to October 2014).
- Most seasons as coach: Dominic Kinnear, nine seasons from 2006 to 2014.
- Most consecutive seasons as coach: Dominic Kinnear, nine consecutive seasons from 2006 to 2014.
- Most trophies won as coach: Dominic Kinnear, 2 MLS Cup titles and 4 conference titles between 2006 and 2014.

== Club records ==
=== Matches ===
- First match: 1–0 vs Charleston Battery, Carolina Challenge Cup 2006, March 18, 2006
- First league match: 5–2 vs Colorado Rapids, April 2, 2006
- First U.S. Open Cup match: 4–2 vs Carolina Dynamo, Fourth round, August 2, 2006
- First CONCACAF match: 0–1 vs Puntarenas F.C., Quarterfinals, February 22, 2007
- First match at Robertson Stadium: 5–2 vs Colorado Rapids, April 2, 2006
- First match at BBVA Compass Stadium: 1–0 vs DC United, May 8, 2012

==== Record wins ====
- Record win: 5–0 vs FC Dallas, March 12, 2016; 5–0 vs Portland Timbers, August 20, 2023
- Record League win: 5–0 vs FC Dallas, March 12, 2016; 5–0 vs Portland Timbers, August 20, 2023
- Record US Open Cup win: 5–0 vs NTX Rayados, June 6, 2018
- Record International win: 4–0 vs Atlante F.C., SuperLiga 2008, July 12, 2008; vs CD FAS, 2012 CONCACAF Champions League, September 20, 2012
- Record home win: 5–0 vs FC Dallas, March 12, 2016; 5–0 vs Portland Timbers, August 20, 2023
- Record away win: 4–0 vs Chicago Fire, July 12, 2007; vs DC United, May 8, 2013

==== Record defeats ====
- Record League defeats: 0–6 vs Philadelphia Union, July 30, 2022
- Record U.S. Cup defeat: 0–3 vs FC Dallas, 2013 Lamar Hunt U.S. Open Cup, June 12, 2013
- Record CONCACAF defeat: 0–3 vs Deportivo Saprissa, 2008 CONCACAF Champions Cup Semifinals, April 9, 2008
- Record home defeat: 0–3 vs multiple
- Record away defeat: 0–6 vs Philadelphia Union, July 30, 2022

==== Streaks ====
- Longest unbeaten run: 14 (all competitions), June 3 to August 1. 2007
- Longest unbeaten run: 11 (league competitions), June 3 to July 22, 2007
- Longest Home unbeaten run: 36, July 9, 2011 to May 12, 2013
- Longest winless run: 16 (league competitions), May 29 to September 3, 2021

==== Wins/draws/losses ====
- Most wins in a league season: 15 (2007, 2024)
- Most draws in a league season: 13 (2006, 2011, 2016)
- Most defeats in a league season: 18 (2019, 2022)
- Fewest wins in a league season: 4 (2020)
- Fewest draws in a league season: 4 (2019)
- Fewest defeats in a league season: 5 (2008)

=== Goals ===
- Most league goals in a season: 58, 2018
- Fewest league goals in a season: 30, 2020
- Most league goals allowed in a season: 59; 2019
- Fewest league goals allowed in a season: 23; 2007

=== Points ===
- Most points in a season: 54 in 34 matches, 2024
- Fewest points in a season: 21 in 23 matches, 2020

=== Attendance ===
- Record home attendance: 70,550 v Los Angeles Galaxy at Reliant Stadium, 2006 Major League Soccer season, August 9, 2006
- Record home attendance at Robertson Stadium: 30,972 vs Kansas City Wizards, 2007 MLS Cup Playoffs, November 10, 2007
- Record home attendance at Robertson Stadium (MLS Regular Season): 30,588 vs LA Galaxy, 2007 Major League Soccer season, October 7, 2007
- Record home attendance at BBVA Compass Stadium: 22,661 vs Seattle Sounders FC, 2017 MLS Cup Playoffs, November 21, 2015
- Record home attendance at BBVA Compass Stadium (MLS Regular Season): 22,651 vs Chicago Fire, 2015 Major League Soccer season, July 3, 2015
