= 2014 Carolina Challenge Cup =

Tournament details
- Host country: United States
- Dates: February 22–March 1
- Teams: 4 (from 1 confederation)
- Venue(s): 1 (in 1 host city)

Final positions
- Champions: D.C. United (4th title)
- Runners-up: Seattle Sounders FC
- Third place: Houston Dynamo

Tournament statistics
- Matches played: 6
- Goals scored: 15 (2.5 per match)

The 2014 Carolina Challenge Cup was the 11th staging of the tournament. The tournament began on February 22 and ended on March 1.

The defending champions, Chicago Fire, will not be participating in the 2014 edition of the tournament. Instead, D.C. United, Houston Dynamo and Seattle Sounders FC will be the three participants in the tournament, in addition to the host, Charleston Battery.

== Teams ==
Team	League	Appearance
(United States) Charleston Battery (hosts)	USL Pro	11th
(United States) D.C. United	MLS	8th
(United States) Houston Dynamo	MLS	4th
(United States) Seattle Sounders FC	MLS	1st

== Standings ==
Team	Pld	W	D	L	GF	GA	GD	Pts
D.C. United	3	1	2	0	5	3	+2	5
Seattle Sounders FC	3	1	2	0	5	4	+1	5
Houston Dynamo	3	1	1	1	3	3	0	4
Charleston Battery	3	0	1	2	2	5	-3	1

== Matches ==
February 22 Match 1	Houston Dynamo	0–2	D.C. United	Charleston, South Carolina
17:00 EST	Bruin (yellow card) 66'	Report	Horst 21' (o.g.); Kitchen (yellow card) 32'; Arnaud (yellow card) 55'; Christian (yellow card) 71'; Seaton 88', (yellow card) 90'	Stadium: Blackbaud Stadium; Attendance: 5,175

February 22 Match 2	Charleston Battery	1–2	Seattle Sounders FC	Charleston, South Carolina
19:15 EST	Falvey 28', (yellow card) 73'; Mueller (yellow card) 51'; Kelly (yellow card) 71'	Report	Alonso 25', (yellow card) 77'; Evans 89' (pen.)	Stadium: Blackbaud Stadium; Attendance: 5,175

February 26 Match 3	Seattle Sounders FC	1–1	Houston Dynamo	Charleston, South Carolina
17:00 EST	Martins 44'; González (yellow card) 45+1'	Report	Davis 14'; Arena (yellow card) 72'	Stadium: Blackbaud Stadium

February 26 Match 4	Charleston Battery	1–1	D.C. United	Charleston, South Carolina
19:30 EST	Ruggles 90+'	Report	Arnaud 71'	Stadium: Blackbaud Stadium

March 1 Match 5	D.C. United	2–2	Seattle Sounders FC	Charleston, South Carolina
17:00 EST	Espíndola 8' (pen.); Kitchen 56'; Boswell (yellow card) 65'; Christian (red card) 76'	Report	Cooper 24'; Pappa 63'	Stadium: Blackbaud Stadium

March 1 Match 6	Charleston Battery	0–2	Houston Dynamo	Charleston, South Carolina
19:15 EST		Report	Cascio 54'; Barnes 64'	Stadium: Blackbaud Stadium

== Scorers ==
1 goal

- (Cuba) Osvaldo Alonso — Seattle Sounders FC
- (United States) Davy Arnaud — D.C. United
- (England) Giles Barnes — Houston Dynamo
- (United States) Tony Cascio — Houston Dynamo
- (United States) Kenny Cooper — Seattle Sounders FC
- (United States) Brad Davis — Houston Dynamo
- (Argentina) Fabián Espíndola — D.C. United
- (United States) Brad Evans — Seattle Sounders FC
- (Republic of Ireland) Colin Falvey — Charleston Battery
- (United States) Perry Kitchen — D.C. United
- (Nigeria) Obafemi Martins — Seattle Sounders FC
- (Guatemala) Marco Pappa — Seattle Sounders FC
- (United States) Drew Ruggles — Charleston Battery
- (Jamaica) Michael Seaton — D.C. United

Own goals

- (United States) David Horst — Houston Dynamo (playing against D.C.)

== See also ==
- Carolina Challenge Cup
- Charleston Battery
- 2014 in American soccer
