= 2022 Carolina Challenge Cup =

Tournament details
- Host country: United States
- Dates: February 12–19
- Teams: 4 (from 1 confederation)
- Venue(s): 1 (in 1 host city)

Final positions
- Champions: Inter Miami (1st title)
- Runners-up: Columbus Crew
- Third place: Charleston Battery
- Fourth place: Charlotte FC

Tournament statistics
- Matches played: 6

The 2022 Carolina Challenge Cup, officially the Breeze Airways Carolina Challenge Cup for sponsorship reasons, was the 15th edition of the Carolina Challenge Cup, an annual soccer tournament held in Charleston, South Carolina by the Charleston Battery, returning after a two-year hiatus. The tournament was held from February 12 to 19, 2022, with all matches played at Patriots Point Soccer Complex in Mount Pleasant, South Carolina.

In addition to the Charleston Battery of the USL Championship (USL), three Major League Soccer (MLS) clubs participated: Columbus Crew, Charlotte FC, and Inter Miami, all of Major League Soccer.

The tournament was Charlotte's first competition in front of fans as they lost to Charleston 1-0 in their debut, with Aidan Apodaca scoring the lone goal. Miami would ultimately win the 2022 CCC in their first time participating.

== Teams ==
Team	League	Appearance
(South Carolina) Charleston Battery (hosts)	USLC	16th
(North Carolina) Charlotte FC	MLS	1st
(Ohio) Columbus Crew	MLS	7th
(Florida) Inter Miami	MLS	1st

== Matches ==
February 12	Inter Miami	1–1	Columbus Crew	Mount Pleasant, SC
1:00 p.m.	Lassiter 59'		Etienne 86'	Stadium: Patriots Point Soccer Complex

February 12	Charleston Battery	1–0	Charlotte FC	Mount Pleasant, SC
7:00 p.m.	Apodaca 13'			Stadium: Patriots Point Soccer Complex

February 15	Columbus Crew	0-0	Charlotte FC	Mount Pleasant, SC
5:00 p.m.				Stadium: Patriots Point Soccer Complex

February 15	Inter Miami	1-0	Charleston Battery	Mount Pleasant, SC
8:00 p.m.	Lassiter 77'			Stadium: Patriots Point Soccer Complex

February 18	Charleston Battery	0-3	Columbus Crew	Mount Pleasant, SC
8:00 p.m.			Mensah 9'; Zelarayán 27'; Santos 49' (pen.)	Stadium: Patriots Point Soccer Complex

February 19	Charlotte FC	1-2	Inter Miami	Mount Pleasant, SC
8:00 p.m.	Makoun 92' (pen.)	Report	Campana 25'; Higuaín 50'	Stadium: Patriots Point Soccer Complex

== Table standings ==
Pos	Club	GP	W	L	T	GF	GA	GD	Pts
1	Inter Miami CF (C)	3	2	0	1	4	2	+2	7
2	Columbus Crew	3	1	0	2	4	1	+3	5
3	Charleston Battery	3	1	2	0	1	4	−3	3
4	Charlotte FC	3	0	2	1	1	3	−2	1

(C) – Cup Winner
