= 2012 Carolina Challenge Cup =

Tournament details
- Host country: United States
- Dates: February 25 – March 3
- Teams: 4 (from 1 confederation)
- Venue(s): 1 (in 1 host city)

Final positions
- Champions: D.C. United (3rd title)
- Runners-up: Chicago Fire
- Third place: Columbus Crew

Tournament statistics
- Matches played: 4
- Goals scored: 10 (2.5 per match)
- Top scorer(s): (United States) Jose Cuevas (2)

The 2012 Carolina Challenge Cup was the ninth staging of the Carolina Challenge Cup, a preseason soccer tournament hosted by USL Pro side, Charleston Battery. Held from February 25–March 3, the Cup featured three Major League Soccer clubs and one USL PRO club.

D.C. United of MLS, the two-time defending champions, successfully defended their title for the third consecutive year, after the tournament was cut short due to inclement weather.

== Teams ==
Four clubs competed in the tournament:

Team	League	Appearance
(United States) Charleston Battery (hosts)	USL Pro	9th
(United States) Chicago Fire	MLS	2nd
(United States) Columbus Crew	MLS	3rd
(United States) D.C. United	MLS	7th

== Standings ==
Team	Pld	W	L	D	GF	GA	GD	Pts
D.C. United	2	2	0	0	4	1	3	6
Chicago Fire	2	1	1	0	1	1	0	3
Columbus Crew	2	0	1	1	2	3	-1	1
Charleston Battery	2	0	1	1	3	5	-2	1

== Matches ==
February 25
17:00 UTC-5

D.C. United	1 – 0	Chicago Fire
Saragosa (yellow card) 30'; Dudar (yellow card) 50'; Salihi 66'	Report	Gargan (yellow card) 33'; Robayo (yellow card) 52'; Anibaba (yellow card) 77'

Blackbaud Stadium
Charleston, South Carolina, USA
February 25
19:15 UTC-5

Charleston Battery	2 – 2	Columbus Crew
Falvey (yellow card) 30'; Kelly 40'; Flatley (yellow card) 42'; Cuevas 89'	Report	Gaven 6'; Mendes (yellow card) 45'; Mirosevic 58'; Tchani (yellow card) 61'; Mendes (yellow card) 89' (red card)

Blackbaud Stadium
Charleston, South Carolina, USA

February 29
17:00 UTC-5

Columbus Crew	0 – 1	Chicago Fire
Tchani (yellow card) 73'	Report	Sanyang (yellow card) 38'; Segares (yellow card) 75'; Puppo 80'

Blackbaud Stadium
Charleston, South Carolina, USA
February 29
19:15 UTC-5

Charleston Battery	1 – 3	D.C. United
Cuevas 29'; Wiltse (red card) 76'	Report	Maicon Santos 13'; Richter 31'; Salihi 88'

Blackbaud Stadium
Charleston, South Carolina, USA

March 3
17:00 UTC-5

D.C. United	cancelled	Columbus Crew

Blackbaud Stadium
Charleston, South Carolina, USA
March 3
19:15 UTC-5

Charleston Battery	cancelled	Chicago Fire

Blackbaud Stadium
Charleston, South Carolina, USA

== Scorers ==
2 goals

- Jose Cuevas (Charleston Battery)
- Hamdi Salihi (D.C. United)

1 goal

- Eddie Gaven (Columbus Crew)
- Milovan Mirošević (Columbus Crew)
- Federico Puppo (Chicago Fire)
- Ryan Richter (D.C. United)
- Maicon Santos (D.C. United)
- Marcelo Saragosa (D.C. United)

== See also ==
- Carolina Challenge Cup
- Charleston Battery
- 2012 in American soccer
