= 2007 Carolina Challenge Cup =

Tournament details
- Host country: United States
- Dates: March 24 – March 31
- Teams: 4 (from 1 confederation)
- Venue(s): 1 (in 1 host city)

Final positions
- Champions: Houston Dynamo (2nd title)
- Runners-up: Toronto FC
- Third place: New York Red Bulls

Tournament statistics
- Matches played: 6
- Goals scored: 14 (2.33 per match)
- Top scorer(s): (United States) Ryan Cochrane (3)

The 2007 Carolina Challenge Cup was a four-team round robin pre-season competition hosted by the Charleston Battery. The Houston Dynamo won the 2007 tournament and went on to win the MLS Cup, marking the fourth consecutive season that the champion went on to win one of the two year-end MLS trophies, the MLS Supporters' Shield or MLS Cup.

== Teams ==
Four clubs competed in the tournament:

Team	League	Appearance
(United States) Charleston Battery (co-hosts)	USL-1	4th
(United States) Houston Dynamo	MLS	2nd
(United States) New York Red Bulls	MLS	2nd
(Canada) Toronto FC	MLS	1st

== Standings ==
Team	Pld	W	L	D	GF	GA	GD	Pts
Houston Dynamo	3	2	0	1	5	2	+3	7
Toronto FC	3	2	1	0	5	3	+2	6
New York Red Bulls	3	1	2	0	3	4	-1	3
Charleston Battery	3	0	2	1	1	5	-4	1

== Matches ==
March 24
18:00 EST

Toronto FC	0 – 2	Houston Dynamo
	Report	Cochrane 16'; Wondolowski 73'

Blackbaud Stadium, Charleston, South Carolina
Attendance: 3,183
March 24
20:15 EST

Charleston Battery	0 – 1	New York Red Bulls
	Report	Kovalenko 90'

Blackbaud Stadium, Charleston, South Carolina
Attendance: 3,183

March 28
18:00 EST

Toronto FC	2 – 1	New York Red Bulls
Eskandarian 9'; Buddle 36'	Report	Wolyniec 21'

Blackbaud Stadium, Charleston, South Carolina
March 28
20:15 EST

Charleston Battery	1 – 1	Houston Dynamo
Sterling 83'	Report	Cochrane 17'

Blackbaud Stadium, Charleston, South Carolina

March 31
18:00 EST

Charleston Battery	0 – 3	Toronto FC
	Report	Eskandarian 3'; Ibrahim 35'; Buddle 73'

Blackbaud Stadium, Charleston, South Carolina
March 31
20:15 EST

Houston Dynamo	2 – 1	New York Red Bulls
Ching 70'; Cochrane 80'	Report	van den Bergh 6'

Blackbaud Stadium, Charleston, South Carolina

== Scorers ==
3 goals

- Ryan Cochrane (Houston Dynamo)

2 goals

- Edson Buddle (Toronto FC)
- Alecko Eskandarian (Toronto FC)

1 goal

- Brian Ching (Houston Dynamo)
- Abbe Ibrahim (Toronto FC)
- Dema Kovalenko (New York Red Bulls)
- Newton Sterling (Charleston Battery)
- Dave van den Bergh (New York Red Bulls)
- John Wolyniec (New York Red Bulls)
- Chris Wondolowski (Houston Dynamo)

== See also ==
- Carolina Challenge Cup
- Charleston Battery
- 2007 in American soccer
