= 2015 Carolina Challenge Cup =

Tournament details
- Host country: United States
- Dates: February 21–28
- Teams: 4 (from 1 confederation)
- Venue: 1 (in 1 host city)

Final positions
- Champions: Houston Dynamo (3rd title)
- Runners-up: New York City FC
- Third place: Charleston Battery

Tournament statistics
- Matches played: 6
- Goals scored: 14 (2.33 per match)
- Top scorer(s): 3 each: Brad Davis (HOU); Ned Grabavoy (NYC FC); Navion Boyd (CB)

The 2015 Carolina Challenge Cup was the 12th staging of the tournament. The tournament ran between February 21–28.

The defending champions, D.C. United, did not participate in the 2015 edition of the tournament (due to their participation in the 2014–15 CONCACAF Champions League), though Houston Dynamo remained along with hosts Charleston Battery. The remaining two places were filled with MLS newcomers New York City FC and Orlando City SC.

== Teams ==
Team	League	Appearance
(United States) Charleston Battery (hosts)	USL Pro	12th
(United States) Houston Dynamo	MLS	5th
(United States) New York City FC	MLS	1st
(United States) Orlando City SC	MLS	1st

== Standings ==
Team	Pld	W	D	L	GF	GA	GD	Pts
Houston Dynamo	3	2	0	1	5	2	3	6
New York City FC	3	1	1	1	5	3	2	4
Charleston Battery	3	1	1	1	2	4	-2	4
Orlando City	3	0	2	1	2	5	-2	2

== Matches ==
February 21 Match 1	Charleston Battery	1–0	Houston Dynamo	Charleston, South Carolina
17:00 EST (UTC−05:00)	Savage 69'	Report		Stadium: Blackbaud Stadium

February 21 Match 2	New York City FC	1–1	Orlando City SC	Charleston, South Carolina
19:30 EST (UTC−05:00)	Shelton 56'	Report	Kaká 31'	Stadium: Blackbaud Stadium

February 25 Match 3	Houston Dynamo	2–1	New York City FC	Charleston, South Carolina
17:00 EST (UTC−05:00)	Davis 51'; Boniek García 70'	Report	Diskerud 81'	Stadium: Blackbaud Stadium

February 25 Match 4	Charleston Battery	1–1	Orlando City SC	Charleston, South Carolina
19:30 EST (UTC−05:00)	Boyd 26'	Report	Shea 10'	Stadium: Blackbaud Stadium

February 28 Match 5	Houston Dynamo	3–0	Orlando City SC	Charleston, South Carolina
17:00 EST (UTC−05:00)	Bruin 27'; Davis 30'; Miranda 45'; Miranda (yellow card) 60'	Report	Collin (red card); Shea (yellow card) 60'; Rivas (red card)	Stadium: Blackbaud Stadium

February 28 Match 6	Charleston Battery	0–3	New York City FC	Charleston, South Carolina
19:30 EST (UTC−05:00)	Boyd (red card) 50'	Report	Grabavoy 26', 37'; Diskerud 63'	Stadium: Blackbaud Stadium

== See also ==
- Carolina Challenge Cup
- Charleston Battery
- 2015 in American soccer
