= 2004 Carolina Challenge Cup =

Tournament details
- Host country: United States
- Dates: March 20 – March 27
- Teams: 4 (from 1 confederation)
- Venue(s): 2 (in 2 host cities)

Final positions
- Champions: Columbus Crew (3rd title)
- Runners-up: D.C. United
- Third place: Charleston Battery

Tournament statistics
- Matches played: 6
- Goals scored: 12 (2 per match)
- Top scorer(s): 3 players with 2 goals

The 2004 Carolina Challenge Cup was the first staging of the Carolina Challenge Cup, a preseason soccer tournament co-hosted by USL A-League side, Charleston Battery and USL Pro Soccer League club Wilmington Hammerheads. Held from March 20–March 28, the Cup featured two Major League Soccer clubs, one USL Pro Soccer League club, and one USL A-League club.

Columbus Crew of MLS won the inaugural tournament on goal differential over D.C. United.

== Teams ==
Four clubs competed in the tournament:

Team	League	Appearance
(United States) Charleston Battery (co-hosts)	A-League	1st
(United States) Wilmington Hammerheads (co-hosts)	USL Pro Soccer League	1st
(United States) Columbus Crew	MLS	1st
(United States) D.C. United	MLS	1st

== Standings ==
Team	Pld	W	L	D	GF	GA	GD	Pts
Columbus Crew	3	2	0	1	5	1	+4	7
D.C. United	3	2	0	1	3	1	+2	7
Charleston Battery	3	0	2	1	3	6	-3	1
Wilmington Hammerheads	3	0	2	1	1	4	-3	1

== Matches ==
March 20
19:30 UTC-5

D.C. United	2 – 1	Charleston Battery
Adu 56'; Convey 83'	Report	Conway 75'

Blackbaud Stadium
Charleston, South Carolina, USA
Attendance: 4,350
Referee: Ricardo Salazar
March 20
19:30 UTC-5

Columbus Crew	2 – 0	Wilmington Hammerheads
Marshall 2'; Hejduk 86'	Report

Legion Stadium
Wilmington, North Carolina, USA

March 24
19:30 UTC-5

Columbus Crew	3 – 1	Charleston Battery
Paule 17'; Hejduk 65'; Marshall 69'	Report	Conway 12'

Blackbaud Stadium
Charleston, South Carolina, USA
Attendance: 1,620
Referee: Ricardo Salazar
March 24
19:30 UTC-5

D.C. United	1 – 0	Wilmington Hammerheads
Moreno 13' (pen.)	Report

Legion Stadium
Wilmington, North Carolina, USA
Attendance: 3,621
Referee: Abbey Okulaja

March 27
18:00 UTC-5

Wilmington Hammerheads	1 – 1	Charleston Battery
Bagley 60'	Report	Forward 64'

Blackbaud Stadium
Charleston, South Carolina, USA
Attendance: 4,803
Referee: Ricardo Salazar
March 27
20:15 UTC-5

D.C. United	0 – 0	Columbus Crew
	Report

Blackbaud Stadium
Charleston, South Carolina, USA
Attendance: 4,803

== Scorers ==
2 goals

- Paul Conway (Charleston Battery)
- Frankie Hejduk (Columbus Crew)
- Chad Marshall (Columbus Crew)

1 goal

- Freddy Adu (D.C. United)
- Chris Bagley (Wilmington Hammerheads)
- Bobby Convey (D.C. United)
- Buddy Forward (Charleston Battery)
- Ross Paule (D.C. United)
- Jaime Moreno (D.C. United)

== See also ==
- Carolina Challenge Cup
- Charleston Battery
- 2004 in American soccer
