= 2006 Carolina Challenge Cup =

Tournament details
- Host country: United States
- Dates: March 18 – March 25
- Teams: 4 (from 1 confederation)
- Venue(s): 1 (in 1 host city)

Final positions
- Champions: Houston Dynamo (1st title)
- Runners-up: D.C. United
- Third place: New York Red Bulls

Tournament statistics
- Matches played: 6
- Goals scored: 10 (1.67 per match)
- Top scorer(s): (Bolivia) Jaime Moreno (3)

The 2006 Carolina Challenge Cup was a four-team round robin pre-season competition hosted by the Charleston Battery. The Houston Dynamo won the 2006 tournament and went on to win the MLS Cup that year.

== Teams ==
Four clubs competed in the tournament:

Team	League	Appearance
(United States) Charleston Battery (hosts)	USL-1	3rd
(United States) D.C. United	MLS	3rd
(United States) Houston Dynamo	MLS	1st
(United States) New York Red Bulls	MLS	1st

== Standings ==
Team	Pld	W	L	D	GF	GA	GD	Pts
Houston Dynamo	3	2	0	1	5	1	+4	7
D.C. United	3	1	0	2	3	2	+1	5
Charleston Battery	3	1	1	1	2	2	0	4
New York Red Bulls	3	0	3	0	0	5	-5	0

== Matches ==
March 18
18:00 EST

Charleston Battery	0 – 1	Houston Dynamo
	Report	Cerritos 74'

Blackbaud Stadium, Charleston, South Carolina
March 18
20:15 EST

D.C. United	1 – 0	New York Red Bulls
Moreno 56'	Report

Blackbaud Stadium, Charleston, South Carolina

March 22
18:00 EST

Charleston Battery	1 – 0	New York Red Bulls
Hollingsworth 14'	Report

Blackbaud Stadium, Charleston, South Carolina
March 22
20:15 EST

D.C. United	1 – 1	Houston Dynamo
Moreno 30' (pen)	Report	Moreno 28'

Blackbaud Stadium, Charleston, South Carolina

March 25
18:00 EST

Charleston Battery	1 – 1	D.C. United
Hollingsworth 67'	Report	Moreno 19' (pen)

Blackbaud Stadium, Charleston, South Carolina
March 25
20:15 EST

Houston Dynamo	3 – 0	New York Red Bulls
Ching 29'; Cochrane 70'; Mullan 78'	Report

Blackbaud Stadium, Charleston, South Carolina

== Scorers ==
3 goals

- Jaime Moreno (D.C. United)

2 goals

- Ben Hollingsworth (Charleston Battery)

1 goal

- Ronald Cerritos (Houston Dynamo)
- Brian Ching (Houston Dynamo)
- Ryan Cochrane (Houston Dynamo)
- Alejandro Moreno (Houston Dynamo)
- Brian Mullan (Houston Dynamo)

== See also ==
- Carolina Challenge Cup
- Charleston Battery
- 2006 in American soccer
