= 2005 Carolina Challenge Cup =

Tournament details
- Host country: United States
- Dates: March 19 – March 25
- Teams: 4 (from 1 confederation)
- Venue(s): 1 (in 1 host city)

Final positions
- Champions: San Jose Earthquakes (3rd title)
- Runners-up: D.C. United
- Third place: Columbus Crew

Tournament statistics
- Matches played: 6
- Goals scored: 13 (2.17 per match)
- Top scorer(s): (United States) Brad Davis (3)

The 2005 Carolina Challenge Cup was a four-team round robin pre-season competition hosted by the Charleston Battery. It was the second edition of the tournament.

== Teams ==
Four clubs competed in the tournament:

Team	League	Appearance
(United States) Charleston Battery (hosts)	USL-1	2nd
(United States) Columbus Crew	MLS	2nd
(United States) D.C. United	MLS	2nd
(United States) San Jose Earthquakes	MLS	1st

== Standings ==
Team	Pld	W	L	D	GF	GA	GD	Pts
San Jose Earthquakes	3	2	0	1	4	1	+3	7
D.C. United	3	1	1	1	5	4	+1	4
Columbus Crew	3	1	1	1	2	4	-2	4
Charleston Battery	3	0	2	1	2	4	-4	1

== Matches ==
March 19
18:00 UTC-5

Charleston Battery	0 – 1	Columbus Crew
	Report	Buddle 12'

Blackbaud Stadium
Charleston, South Carolina, USA
March 19
20:15 UTC-5

D.C. United	0 – 2	San Jose Earthquakes
	Report	Davis 10' 18'

Blackbaud Stadium
Charleston, South Carolina, USA

March 22
18:00 UTC-5

Columbus Crew	1 – 1	San Jose Earthquakes
Moreno 45'	Report	Cameron 90'

Blackbaud Stadium
Charleston, South Carolina, USA
March 22
20:15 UTC-5

D.C. United	2 – 2	Charleston Battery
Moreno 7'; Quintanilla 86'	Report	Simmonds 14'; Khamalu 85'

Blackbaud Stadium
Charleston, South Carolina, USA

March 25
18:00 UTC-5

San Jose Earthquakes	1 – 0	Charleston Battery
Davis 85'	Report

Blackbaud Stadium
Charleston, South Carolina, USA
March 25
20:15 UTC-5

D.C. United	3 – 0	Columbus Crew
Petke 14'; Gómez 21'; Moreno 50'	Report

Blackbaud Stadium
Charleston, South Carolina, USA

== Scorers ==
3 goals

- Brad Davis (San Jose Earthquakes)

2 goals

- Jaime Moreno (D.C. United)

1 goal

- Edson Buddle (Columbus Crew)
- Knox Cameron (San Jose Earthquakes)
- Christian Gómez (D.C. United)
- Boyzz Khamalu (Charleston Battery)
- Alejandro Moreno (Columbus Crew)
- Mike Petke (D.C. United)
- Eliseo Quintanilla (D.C. United)
- Gregory Simmonds (Charleston Battery)

== See also ==
- Carolina Challenge Cup
- Charleston Battery
- 2005 in American soccer
