= Ben Hollingsworth =

Ben Hollingsworth may refer to:

- Ben Hollingsworth (soccer) (born 1982), American soccer player
- Ben Hollingsworth (actor) (born 1984), Canadian actor
