= 2009 Carolina Challenge Cup =

The Carolina Challenge Cup is a four-team round robin pre-season competition hosted by the Charleston Battery. It was started in 2004 and features teams from Major League Soccer and the United Soccer Leagues. The 2009 Carolina Challenge Cup was won by Real Salt Lake.

== Teams ==
Four clubs competed in the tournament:

Team	League	Appearance
(United States) Charleston Battery (co-hosts)	USL-1	6th
(United States) D.C. United	MLS	4th
(United States) Real Salt Lake	MLS	1st
(Canada) Toronto FC	MLS	3rd

== Results ==
- 2009-03-07 D.C. United Real Salt Lake 0 3
- 2009-03-07 Charleston Toronto FC 1 2
- 2009-03-11 D.C. United Toronto FC 1 2
- 2009-03-11 Charleston Real Salt Lake 1 2
- 2009-03-14 Toronto FC Real Salt Lake 1 2
- 2009-03-14 Charleston D.C. United 0 2

== Final standings ==
2009-Team	Pts	Pld	W	L	T	GF	GA	GD
Real Salt Lake	9	3	3	0	0	7	2	+5
Toronto FC	6	3	2	1	0	5	4	+1
D.C. United	3	3	1	2	0	3	5	-2
Charleston Battery	0	3	0	3	0	2	6	-4

== See also ==
Carolina Challenge Cup
