= 2010 Carolina Challenge Cup =

Tournament details
- Dates: March 13 – 20
- Teams: 4
- Venue(s): 1 (in Charleston, South Carolina host cities)

Final positions
- Champions: (United States) D.C. United (1st title)
- Runners-up: (United States) Real Salt Lake

Tournament statistics
- Matches played: 6
- Goals scored: 11 (1.83 per match)
- Attendance: 25,954 (4,326 per match)
- Top scorer(s): (Bolivia) Jaime Moreno (5)
- All statistics correct as of On September 4, 2010.

The Carolina Challenge Cup is a four-team round robin pre-season competition hosted by the Charleston Battery. It was started in 2004 and features teams from Major League Soccer and the United Soccer Leagues. The 2010 Carolina Challenge Cup was contested among Charleston Battery, D.C. United, Real Salt Lake and Toronto FC, with D.C. United emerging as champions.

== Teams ==
Four clubs competed in the tournament:

Team	League	Appearance
(United States) Charleston Battery (hosts)	D2 Pro League	7th
(United States) D.C. United	MLS	5th
(United States) Real Salt Lake	MLS	2nd
(Canada) Toronto FC	MLS	4th

== Standings ==
Team	Pts	Pld	W	D	L	GF	GA	GD
D.C. United	9	3	3	0	0	5	1	+4
Real Salt Lake	6	2	2	0	1	5	3	+2
Toronto FC	1	3	0	1	2	0	2	-2
Charleston Battery	1	3	0	1	2	1	5	-4

== Matches ==
March 13
17:00

D.C. United	2 – 1	Real Salt Lake
Moreno 77', 88'	Report	Findley 40' (pen.)

Blackbaud Stadium, Charleston, South Carolina, United States
Attendance: 3,316
March 13
19:15

Toronto FC	0 – 0	Charleston Battery
	Report

Blackbaud Stadium, Charleston, South Carolina, United States
Attendance: 3,316
March 17
17:00

Charleston Battery	1 – 3	Real Salt Lake
Mayard 36'	Report	Findley 10'; Espindola 76', 90+1'

Blackbaud Stadium, Charleston, South Carolina, United States
Attendance: 4,625
March 17
19:15

Toronto FC	0 – 1	D.C. United
	Report	Moreno 62'

Blackbaud Stadium, Charleston, South Carolina, United States
Attendance: 4,625
March 20
17:00

Toronto FC	0 – 1	Real Salt Lake
	Report	Saborio 56'

Blackbaud Stadium, Charleston, South Carolina, United States
Attendance: 5,036
March 20
19:15

D.C. United	2 – 0	Charleston Battery
Moreno 33', 45' (pen.)	Report

Blackbaud Stadium, Charleston, South Carolina, United States
Attendance: 5,036

== Scorers ==
5 goals

- Jaime Moreno (D.C. United)

2 goals

- Fabian Espindola (Real Salt Lake)
- Robbie Findley (Real Salt Lake)

1 goal

- Pierre-Rudolph Mayard (Charleston Battery)
- Alvaro Saborio (Real Salt Lake)

== See also ==
2010 in American soccer
