= Newton Sterling =

Jamaican footballer (born 1984)

Personal information
- Full name: Newton Kemar Sterling
- Date of birth: 12 November 1984 (age 41)
- Place of birth: Morant Bay, Jamaica
- Height: 6 ft 4 in (1.93 m)
- Position: Striker

Team information
- Current team: Tivoli Gardens FC
- Number: 25

Youth career
- Springfield
- Berlin FC

Senior career*
Years	Team	Apps	(Gls)
	Harbour View	15	(6)
	Real Mona	23	(10)
2003–2005	Constant Spring	24	(9)
2005–2006	Hapoel Jerusalem	21	(8)
2006	Sogndal	23	(6)
2006–2007	Village United	22	(10)
2007–2011	Portmore United	14	(7)
2008	→ Waterhouse (loan)	12	(5)
2009	→ Arnett Gardens (loan)	13	(6)
2011–2013	Antigua Barracuda FC	16	(6)

International career^{‡}
2005–2006	Jamaica	8	(4)
- * Club domestic league appearances and goals as of 3 June 2011 ‡ National team caps and goals as of 30 May 2012

Newton Sterling (born 12 November 1984) is a Jamaican footballer who currently plays for Antigua Barracuda FC in the USL Professional Division.

== Club career ==
Sterling began his career in the Jamaica National Premier League, playing for Harbour View, Real Mona and Constant Spring, before moving to Israel in 2005 to play for Hapoel Jerusalem. He played just two games for the club before moving to Norway to play for Sogndal on a short-term contract.

Sterling returned to Jamaica in late 2006 to play for Village United. After taking part in a two-month trial at Swedish team GIF Sundsvall, and training with Charleston Battery in the spring of 2007, he joined Portmore United, and spent the next four seasons with the club. He was part of the Portmore team that won the Jamaica National Premier League title in 2008. He also spent time on loan with Waterhouse in 2008 and Arnett Gardens in 2009.

In 2011 Sterling transferred to the new Antigua Barracuda FC team prior to its first season in the USL Professional Division. He made his debut for the Barracudas on 21 April 2011, in a 1–0 loss to Sevilla FC Puerto Rico.

== International career ==
Sterling made his debut for Jamaica in 2005 against Cuba, but has played only one other international since then, against the USA in April 2006.
