= Osvaldo Alonso =

Cuban footballer (born 1985)

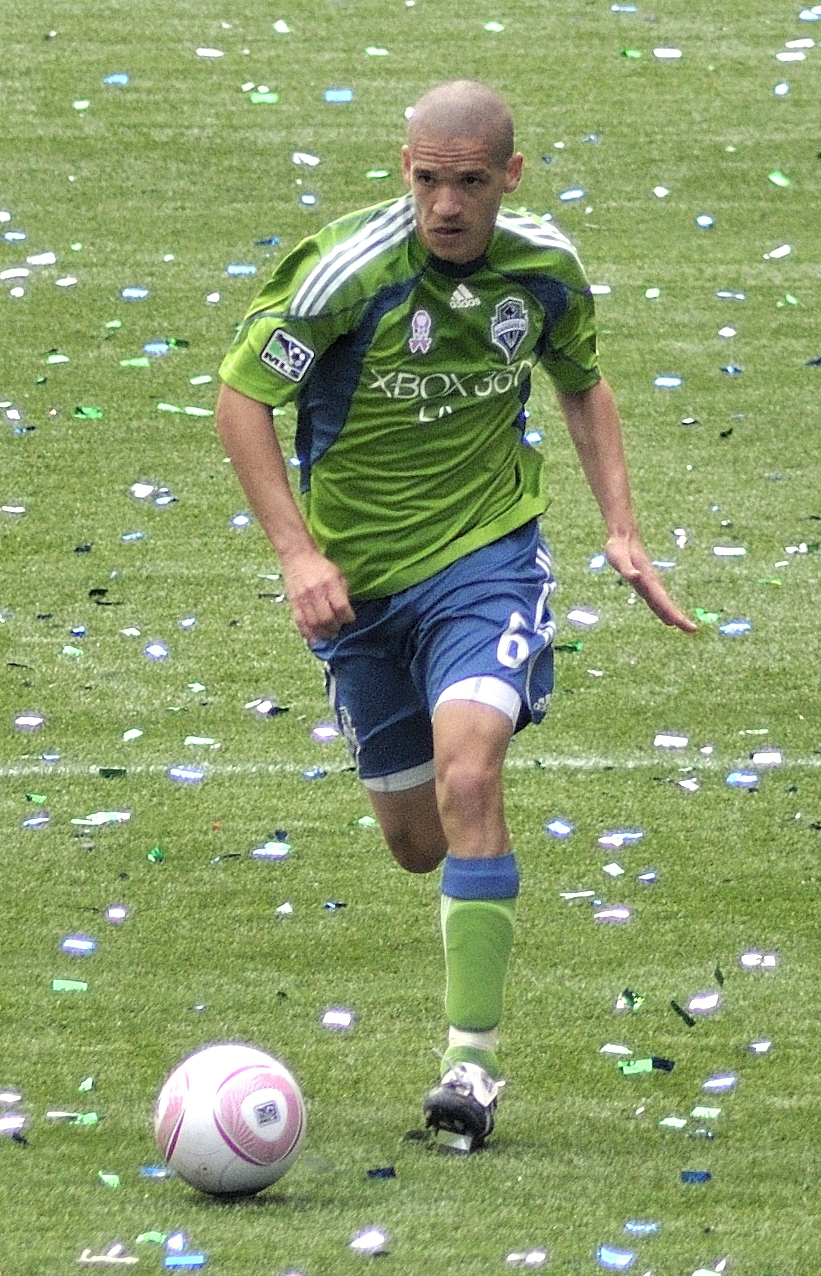
- Alonso playing for Seattle Sounders FC in 2010

Personal information
- Full name: Osvaldo Alonso Moreno
- Date of birth: November 11, 1985 (age 40)
- Place of birth: San Cristóbal, Cuba
- Height: 1.80 m (5 ft 11 in)
- Position: Defensive midfielder

Senior career*
| Years | Team | Apps | (Gls) |
| 2005–2007 | Pinar del Río | 42 | (14) |
| 2008 | Charleston Battery | 23 | (4) |
| 2009–2018 | Seattle Sounders FC | 277 | (10) |
| 2019–2021 | Minnesota United FC | 61 | (3) |
| 2022–2023 | Atlanta United FC | 11 | (0) |
| 2023 | Atlanta United 2 | 1 | (0) |
| 2024 | Seattle Sounders FC | 0 | (0) |
| 2025 | Des Moines Menace | 0 | (0) |
| Total | | 415 | (31) |

International career
- Cuba U23
| 2006–2007 | Cuba | 17 | (2) |
- * Club domestic league appearances and goals

Osvaldo Alonso Moreno (born November 11, 1985) is a Cuban former professional footballer who played as a defensive midfielder. He defected from Cuba in 2007 and became a U.S. citizen in 2012. During his decade-long career with Seattle Sounders FC, Alonso played as a defensive midfielder who was known for his style of harassing, tackling and covering the field, while getting forward to supply enough offense to be considered a threat. This style of play had earned the nickname "Honey Badger" from Seattle fans for his fearless, aggressive playing style.

== Career ==
=== Professional ===
Alonso began his career with Pinar del Río in his homeland, after which he defected to the United States in June 2007.

=== Charleston Battery ===
He trained with Chivas USA and was offered a $12,900 developmental contract with the team. Instead, Alonso signed with Charleston Battery on the theory he would get more playing time on a USL First Division team. He impressed early after a strong outing in the preseason Carolina Challenge Cup 2008 and enjoyed an impressive debut season in which he started 31 games for the Battery and scored 7 goals. He was named 2008 team MVP and Newcomer of the Year by fan votes, the team's Players' Player of the Year by a team vote, and the USL-1 Rookie of the Year by league coach and GM vote.

=== Seattle Sounders FC ===
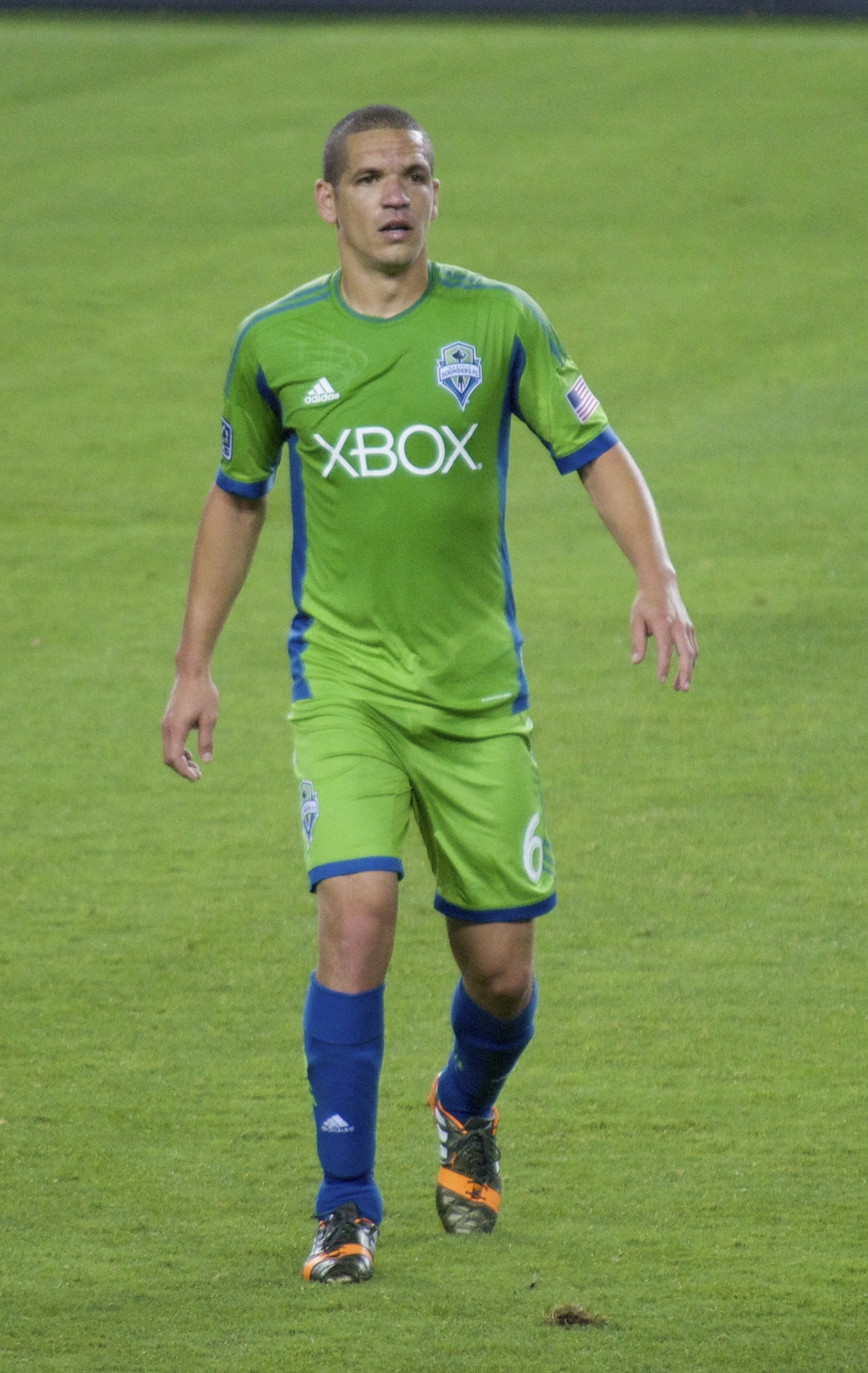
Playing for the Seattle Sounders in 2014

In 2008, Alonso was signed by Seattle Sounders FC, for whom he quickly became a regular starter at defensive midfield. In the 2009 MLS Season, he started 28 of 29 appearances in the regular season and playoffs. He played the full 90 minutes in 26 games and all 210 minutes in both playoff games against Houston. After missing three matches with a quadriceps strain, Alonso returned to score on a long-range blast against D.C. United on June 17. He finished with one goal and three assists for the season. All three assists came during first two matches. Alonso also appeared in two U.S. Open Cup games, including 90 minutes in the final.

In 2010, Alonso returned from injury to help Seattle post the league's best record in the second half of the season. He started 23 of 25 appearances in the regular season and playoffs, matching his 2009 totals with one goal and three assists. He scored the game-winner against Chivas on October 15. Alonso missed eight games due to a quadriceps strain that happened on May 8 and returned against FC Dallas on July 11. Seattle was 11-3-5 in regular season matches when he played at least 45 minutes. Alonso also appeared in two U.S. Open Cup and five CONCACAF Champions League matches.

In February 2011, Alonso signed a contract extension with Seattle through the 2014 season. In 2011, he led field players with 33 appearances and 2891 minutes (ranked 12th among field players in MLS). He played the full 90 minutes in each of his 32 MLS starts. Alonso scored a career-high three goals and matched his high with three assists. He scored the game-winner at Portland on July 10 by converting his first career penalty. He finished second on the team with 54 shots. He was selected as an MLS All-Star for the first time. He scored both goals in 2–2 draw at Comunicaciones on September 27 in a CCL Group Stage match. Alonso was named U.S. Open Cup Player of the Round for his performance in the final. (He added late goal in a 2–0 win over Chicago.) He made 43 appearances and 40 starts across all competitions.

In 2012, Alonso was named to the MLS Best XI for the first time in after a stellar season in midfield, leading the team with 30 starts. He compiled a team-high 2,688 minutes in regular season play, the second-highest total by a field player in franchise history behind his 2011 total. He was named an MLS All-Star for the second straight season and voted team MVP for the third straight year. Alonso played 56 minutes in a 3–2 win over Chelsea in the 2012 MLS All-Star Game. His lone goal of the season came on a 65th minute game-winner at Colorado on July 28 when he volleyed a 12-yard shot into the back of the net. He was named the 2012 U.S. Open Cup Player of the Tournament after scoring four goals and two assists in four games, including the winner against Atlanta on May 30 and a 30-yard volley against Cal FC on June 5. For the season he totaled five goals and five assists while leading the team with 42 starts and 3,749 minutes across all competitions.

In 2013, Alonso was named an inactive MLS All-Star, earning his third All-Star selection in his five-year MLS career.

After missing games in both the 2014 and 2015 MLS Cup Playoffs, Alonso was being actively shopped around the league by the Seattle Sounders FC front office due to durability concerns before the start of the 2016 MLS season. A trade did not materialize, and Alonso went on to make 38 league and playoff appearances for the 2016 MLS Cup winning Sounders. He picked up an injury during the playoffs for the third season in a row during the second leg of the Western Conference Finals against the Colorado Rapids when a collision led to a sprained knee. Alonso played through the injury, playing all 120 minutes of the 2016 MLS Cup Final in a penalty shootout win over Toronto FC. He required four pain killing injections before the Final and another four injections at half time to make it through the game. Head coach Brian Schmetzer praised Alonso for his determination and service to the club after the victory.

Alonso passed 20,000 minutes played for Seattle on April 14, 2017, becoming the first to do so at the MLS level in team history and the 10th in league history to do so while playing for one team.

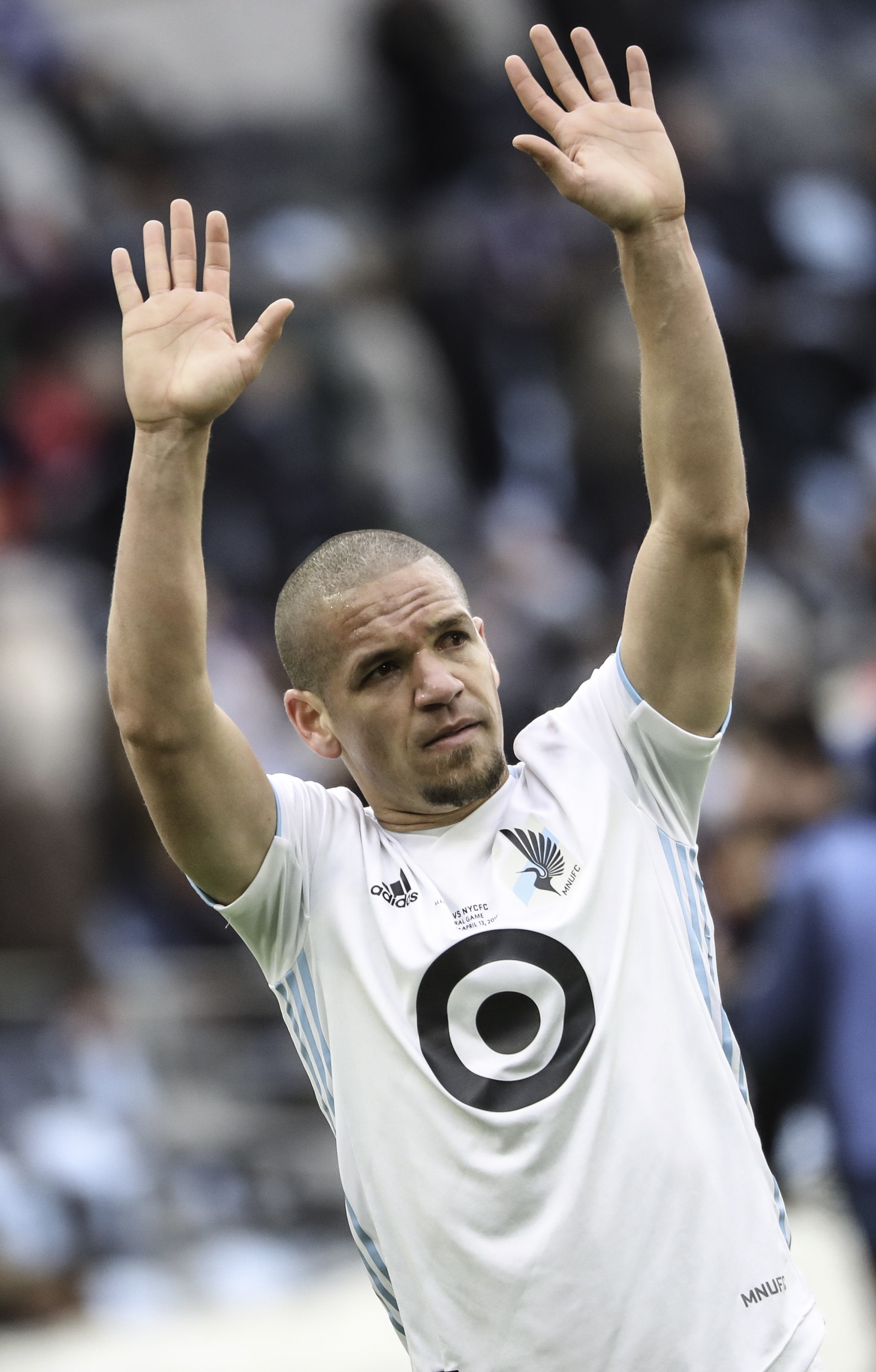
Alonso with Minnesota United in 2019

=== Minnesota United FC ===
Following his release by Seattle, Alonso joined Minnesota United FC on January 10, 2019, having been the last Sounders player to have played for the club from its first season in MLS. At the same time, Minnesota traded for the top spot in the waiver order as well as two fourth-round picks in the 2019 MLS SuperDraft, while sending a second-round pick in the 2020 MLS SuperDraft and the fourth spot in the waiver order to Orlando City SC.

Alonso scored his first goal for Minnesota on April 13, 2019, during a 3–3 draw against New York City FC. It was also the first goal to be scored at their new home stadium, Allianz Field.

In March 2021, Alonso re-signed with Minnesota.

=== Atlanta United FC ===
On December 23, 2021, Alonso signed a one-year deal with Atlanta United FC ahead of their 2022 season. In his fourth match with Atlanta, he tore his right anterior cruciate ligament, ending his season in April 2022. Alonso returned to play as a substitute for reserve side Atlanta United 2 in MLS Next Pro on June 4, 2023. He returned to the senior squad later that month. Alonso finished the 2023 season with seven appearances, all as a substitute.

=== Retirement ===
On January 8, 2024, Alonso announced his retirement from professional soccer. During his career, he made 349 regular season appearances for MLS teams. He signed a one-day contract to retire with the Sounders on February 29, 2024.

== International career ==
Alonso served as captain of the Cuba U-23 national team during qualification for the men's football tournament at the 2008 Summer Olympics. He made his debut for the senior Cuba national team in a Caribbean Nations Cup 2006-07 match against the Turks & Caicos Islands in September 2006. During his time with the Cuba national team, he earned 17 caps, scoring two goals. His final appearance for the national team was at the 2007 CONCACAF Gold Cup in June 2007 against Panama.

=== Defection to the United States ===
In June 2007, Alonso defected from Cuba while the team was in Houston, Texas to face Honduras at the Gold Cup. Another Cuban teammate, Lester Moré, defected to the United States during the team's same trip to the United States. Alonso was with teammates at a Wal-Mart when he went off by himself while browsing through merchandise and then left the store. He walked several blocks from the store until he found a man who spoke Spanish and borrowed a cell phone to call a friend in Miami, Florida.

On June 19, 2012, Alonso became a citizen of the United States of America, and he stated that he would like to play for the United States national team despite playing for Cuba in the past. He has not been called up to the Cuba national team since he defected to the United States. The FIFA statutes state that:

"If a Player who has been fielded by his Association in an international match in accordance with art. 5 par. 2 permanently loses the nationality of that country without his consent or against his will due to a decision by a government authority, he may request permission to play for another Association whose nationality he already has or has acquired."

== Personal life ==
Alonso is married to Liang Perez and has three children. His return to Atlanta United FC after his ACL tear was prompted by a request from his daughter Paulina.

In January 2025, Alonso joined the ownership group for USL Spokane, comprising Spokane Velocity FC and Spokane Zephyr FC. The Velocity are a men's professional team competing in USL League One, and the Zephyr are a women's professional team competing in USL Super League.

== Career statistics ==
As of December 23, 2023

Appearances and goals by club, season and competition
| Club | Season | League | | | Playoffs | | U.S. Open Cup | | Champions League | | Total | |
| Club | Season | Division | Apps | Goals | Apps | Goals | Apps | Goals | Apps | Goals | Apps | Goals |
|---|---|---|---|---|---|---|---|---|---|---|---|---|
| Charleston Battery | 2008 | United Soccer League | 23 | 4 | 2 | 1 | 6 | 2 | – | | 31 | 7 |
| Seattle Sounders FC | 2009 | Major League Soccer | 27 | 1 | 2 | 0 | 2 | 0 | – | | 31 | 1 |
| Seattle Sounders FC | 2010 | Major League Soccer | 23 | 1 | 2 | 0 | 2 | 0 | 5 | 0 | 32 | 1 |
| Seattle Sounders FC | 2011 | Major League Soccer | 33 | 3 | 2 | 1 | 4 | 1 | 8 | 2 | 47 | 7 |
| Seattle Sounders FC | 2012 | Major League Soccer | 30 | 1 | 4 | 0 | 4 | 3 | 3 | 0 | 41 | 4 |
| Seattle Sounders FC | 2013 | Major League Soccer | 26 | 0 | 3 | 1 | 0 | 0 | 4 | 0 | 33 | 1 |
| Seattle Sounders FC | 2014 | Major League Soccer | 33 | 0 | 1 | 1 | 3 | 1 | 0 | 0 | 37 | 2 |
| Seattle Sounders FC | 2015 | Major League Soccer | 22 | 0 | 0 | 0 | 0 | 0 | 0 | 0 | 22 | 0 |
| Seattle Sounders FC | 2016 | Major League Soccer | 32 | 3 | 6 | 0 | 0 | 0 | 2 | 0 | 40 | 3 |
| Seattle Sounders FC | 2017 | Major League Soccer | 27 | 1 | 1 | 0 | 0 | 0 | 0 | 0 | 28 | 1 |
| Seattle Sounders FC | 2018 | Major League Soccer | 25 | 0 | 2 | 0 | 0 | 0 | 0 | 0 | 27 | 0 |
| Seattle Sounders FC | Total | | 278 | 10 | 23 | 3 | 15 | 5 | 22 | 2 | 338 | 20 |
| Minnesota United FC | 2019 | Major League Soccer | 27 | 2 | 1 | 0 | 3 | 0 | 0 | 0 | 31 | 2 |
| Minnesota United FC | 2020 | Major League Soccer | 10 | 0 | 3 | 0 | 0 | 0 | 0 | 0 | 13 | 0 |
| Minnesota United FC | 2021 | Major League Soccer | 24 | 1 | 1 | 0 | 0 | 0 | 0 | 0 | 25 | 1 |
| Minnesota United FC | Total | | 61 | 3 | 5 | 0 | 3 | 0 | 0 | 0 | 69 | 3 |
| Atlanta United FC | 2022 | Major League Soccer | 4 | 0 | 0 | 0 | 0 | 0 | 0 | 0 | 4 | 0 |
| Atlanta United FC | 2023 | Major League Soccer | 7 | 0 | 0 | 0 | 2 | 0 | 0 | 0 | 9 | 0 |
| Career total | | | 373 | 17 | 30 | 4 | 26 | 7 | 22 | 2 | 451 | 30 |

== Honors ==
Pinar del Río

- Campeonato Nacional de Fútbol de Cuba: 2006

Seattle Sounders FC

- MLS Cup: 2016
- U.S. Open Cup: 2009, 2010, 2011, 2014
- MLS Supporters' Shield: 2014

Individual

- MLS All-Star: 2011, 2012, 2013, (Note: Named to the inactive list) 2014
- MLS Best XI: 2012
