= Carolina Challenge Cup =

Pre-season soccer tournament in the U.S.

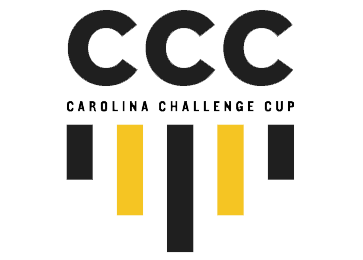
- Organizer(s): Charleston Battery
- Founded: 2004; 22 years ago
- Region: United States
- Teams: 4
- Current champion(s): Inter Miami CF (1st title)
- Most championships: D.C. United; Columbus Crew (4 titles each)
- Website: carolinachallengecup
- 2022

The Carolina Challenge Cup, officially the Breeze Airways™ Carolina Challenge Cup for sponsorship reasons, is a four-team round robin pre-season competition hosted by the Charleston Battery. It was started in 2004 and features teams from Major League Soccer and the United Soccer Leagues. The Columbus Crew edged out D.C. United on goal differential to win the 2004 competition, while the San Jose Earthquakes won the 2005 competition. San Jose's second iteration (although a separate team), the Houston Dynamo, won the 2006 and 2007 versions. The San Jose Earthquakes again won the tournament on their return to the MLS in 2008 while Real Salt Lake claimed the title in their debut in 2009.

Over the first few years of the tournament, the champion had gone on to win one of the two year-end MLS trophies, the Supporters' Shield or MLS Cup. This streak ended in 2008 as San Jose Earthquakes failed to make the playoffs, consequently missing out on both titles. Between 2008 and 2010 it either predicted the MLS Cup winner or the team with the worst record in the league. San Jose and D.C United had the worst records in 2008 and 2010 respectively, while Real Salt Lake won the 2009 MLS Cup.

== Format ==
The tournament has always featured four clubs in a round-robin format, with each club playing three games over the span of a week.

== History ==
The cup competition was established in 2004 by the Charleston Battery, who invited teams from Major League Soccer to participate. It was the first competition hosted by a lower-league team to feature MLS teams during their preseason.

The cup was not held in 2016, instead opting to hold individual friendly matches with Saint Louis FC, Wilmington Hammerheads and the New York Cosmos. The Carolina Challenge Cup was played again from 2017 to 2019, and resumed again in 2022 following a two-year hiatus. Breeze Airways was announced as the cup's title sponsor on January 13, 2022, in an official club statement.

=== Coffee Pot Cup ===
A highlight of the competitions that have been held so far is the Coffee Pot Cup, a game between D.C. United and the host Charleston Battery, making it a rare example of an MLS-USL team rivalry. The history behind this comes from a postgame incident after the Third Round of the 1999 U.S. Open Cup, where Charleston pulled a shocking 4-3 extra time upset at home over D.C. A news report from then:

"D.C. United apparently used the visitors' locker room to vent its frustration over losing to the Charleston Battery in last Wednesday's US Open Cup match at Blackbaud Stadium here. Members of the Major League Soccer team smashed two coffee pots and pulled off some showerheads, according to Battery officials. 'I think a bill will be sent to them,' Battery general manager Buckley Andrews said earlier this week. The US Soccer Federation website's match report on Charleston's 4-3 overtime win over the two-time MLS champion called it 'one of the biggest upsets ever seen in American soccer history ... It will surely go down as an Open Cup classic.'"

After a few years, supporters of both sides in the name of spirited competition decided to have an actual Coffee Pot played for between the sides as a friendly wager. The winner has the other team's supporters fill the Cup with beer for the winning team's supporters to enjoy. Supporters of both sides say that whenever the two sides play, they are playing for the Coffee Pot Cup (the two sides could meet in the U.S. Open Cup if drawn together, or in an arranged friendly). The inaugural winners of the Cup in 2004 were D.C. United after winning 2–1. In 2005 and 2006, the two teams played to a tie (2-2, 1-1), meaning no one had to pay for the beer to fill the Cup, but D.C. maintained possession.

Mainly due to their commitment to play in the CONCACAF Champions League, D.C. United were unable to play in the 2007 and 2008 versions of the tournament.

In 2008, the teams competed in the final of the Lamar Hunt U.S. Open Cup, as D.C. United defeated Charleston 2–1 on September 3, 2008, at RFK Stadium.

- 2004, Carolina Challenge Cup: D.C. United 2, Charleston Battery 1
- 2005, Carolina Challenge Cup: D.C. United 2, Charleston Battery 2
- 2006, Carolina Challenge Cup: D.C. United 1, Charleston Battery 1
- 2006, Cary, NC Friendly: D.C. United 2, Charleston Battery 0
- 2008, US Open Cup: D.C. United 2, Charleston Battery 1
- 2009, Carolina Challenge Cup: D.C. United 2, Charleston Battery 0
- 2010, Carolina Challenge Cup: D.C. United 2, Charleston Battery 0
- 2011. Carolina Challenge Cup: D.C. United 2, Charleston Battery 1
- 2012. Carolina Challenge Cup: D.C. United 3, Charleston Battery 1
- 2014. Carolina Challenge Cup: D.C. United 1, Charleston Battery 1

== Results ==
Ed.	Year	Champion	Runner-up	3rd Place	4th Place
1	2004	(United States) Columbus Crew	(United States) D.C. United	(United States) Charleston Battery	(United States) Wilmington Hammerheads
2	2005	(United States) San Jose Earthquakes	(United States) D.C. United	(United States) Columbus Crew	(United States) Charleston Battery
3	2006	(United States) Houston Dynamo	(United States) D.C. United	(United States) Charleston Battery	(United States) New York Red Bulls
4	2007	(United States) Houston Dynamo	(Canada) Toronto FC	(United States) New York Red Bulls	(United States) Charleston Battery
5	2008	(United States) San Jose Earthquakes	(United States) Charleston Battery	(United States) New York Red Bulls	(Canada) Toronto FC
6	2009	(United States) Real Salt Lake	(Canada) Toronto FC	(United States) D.C. United	(United States) Charleston Battery
7	2010	(United States) D.C. United	(United States) Real Salt Lake	(Canada) Toronto FC	(United States) Charleston Battery
8	2011	(United States) D.C. United	(United States) Charleston Battery	(United States) Chicago Fire	(Canada) Toronto FC
9	2012	(United States) D.C. United	(United States) Chicago Fire	(United States) Columbus Crew	(United States) Charleston Battery
10	2013	(United States) Chicago Fire	(Canada) Vancouver Whitecaps FC	(United States) Charleston Battery	(United States) Houston Dynamo
11	2014	(United States) D.C. United	(United States) Seattle Sounders FC	(United States) Houston Dynamo	(United States) Charleston Battery
12	2015	(United States) Houston Dynamo	(United States) New York City FC	(United States) Charleston Battery	(United States) Orlando City SC
–	2016	(Not held)			
13	2017	(United States) Columbus Crew	(United States) Atlanta United FC	(United States) Charleston Battery	(United States) Seattle Sounders FC
14	2018	(United States) Columbus Crew	(United States) Charleston Battery	(United States) Atlanta United FC	(United States) Minnesota United FC
15	2019	(United States) Columbus Crew	(United States) Chicago Fire	(United States) FC Cincinnati	(United States) Charleston Battery
–	2020–21	(Not held)			
16	2022	(United States) Inter Miami CF	(United States) Columbus Crew	(United States) Charleston Battery	(United States) Charlotte FC

== Titles by team ==
Team	Wins	Runners-up	Years won	Years runner-up
D.C. United	4	3	2010, 2011, 2012, 2014	2004, 2005, 2006
Columbus Crew SC	4	1	2004, 2017, 2018, 2019	2022
Houston Dynamo	3	0	2006, 2007, 2015	
San Jose Earthquakes	2	0	2005, 2008	
Chicago Fire	1	2	2013	2012, 2019
Real Salt Lake	1	1	2009	2010
Inter Miami CF	1	0	2022	
