= 2008 Carolina Challenge Cup =

Tournament details
- Dates: March 15 – 22
- Teams: 4
- Venue(s): 1 (in 1 host city)

Final positions
- Champions: San Jose Earthquakes (2nd title)
- Runners-up: Charleston Battery
- Third place: New York Red Bulls

Tournament statistics
- Matches played: 6
- Goals scored: 13 (2.17 per match)
- Top scorer(s): 2 players with 2 goals
- All statistics correct as of October 13, 2013.

The 2008 Carolina Challenge Cup was a four-team round robin pre-season competition hosted by the Charleston Battery. The San Jose Earthquakes won their second title.

== Teams ==
Four clubs competed in the tournament:

Team	League	Appearance
(United States) Charleston Battery (co-hosts)	USL-1	5th
(United States) D.C. United	MLS	4th
(United States) San Jose Earthquakes	MLS	2nd
(Canada) Toronto FC	MLS	2nd

== Standings ==
Team	Pld	W	L	D	GF	GA	GD	Pts
San Jose Earthquakes	3	3	0	0	6	1	+5	9
Charleston Battery	3	1	1	1	4	3	+1	4
New York Red Bulls	3	0	1	2	2	5	-3	2
Toronto FC	3	0	2	1	1	4	-3	1

March 15
18:00 EST

Toronto FC	0 – 1	San Jose Earthquakes
	Report	Hernandez 22'

Blackbaud Stadium, Charleston, South Carolina
March 16
15:00 EST

Charleston Battery	1 – 1	New York Red Bulls
Kenga 80'	Report	Mesa 79'

Blackbaud Stadium, Charleston, South Carolina

March 19
18:00 EST

Toronto FC	1 – 1	New York Red Bulls
Cunningham 10'	Report	Wolyniec 74'

Blackbaud Stadium, Charleston, South Carolina
March 19
20:15 EST

Charleston Battery	1 – 2	San Jose Earthquakes
Spicer 5'	Report	Corrales 26'; Kamara 70'

Blackbaud Stadium, Charleston, South Carolina

March 22
18:00 EST

Charleston Battery	2 – 0	Toronto FC
Patterson 38' 50'	Report

Blackbaud Stadium, Charleston, South Carolina
March 22
20:15 EST

San Jose Earthquakes	3 – 0	New York Red Bulls
Kamara 1'; Glinton 49'; Brunner 88' (o.g.)	Report

Blackbaud Stadium, Charleston, South Carolina

== Scorers ==
2 goals

- (Trinidad and Tobago) Randi Patterson (Charleston Battery)
- (Sierra Leone) Kei Kamara (San Jose Earthquakes)

1 goal

- (United States) Ramiro Corrales (San Jose Earthquakes)
- (United States) Jeff Cunningham (Toronto FC)
- (Turks and Caicos Islands) Glinton (San Jose Earthquakes)
- (United States) Jason Hernandez (San Jose Earthquakes)
- (Kenya) David Kenga (Charleston Battery)
- (United States) Kevin Mesa (New York Red Bulls)
- (United States) Darren Spicer (Charleston Battery)
- (United States) John Wolyniec (New York Red Bulls)

== See also ==
- Carolina Challenge Cup
- Charleston Battery
- 2008 in American soccer
