= Boniek García =

Honduran football player (born 1984)

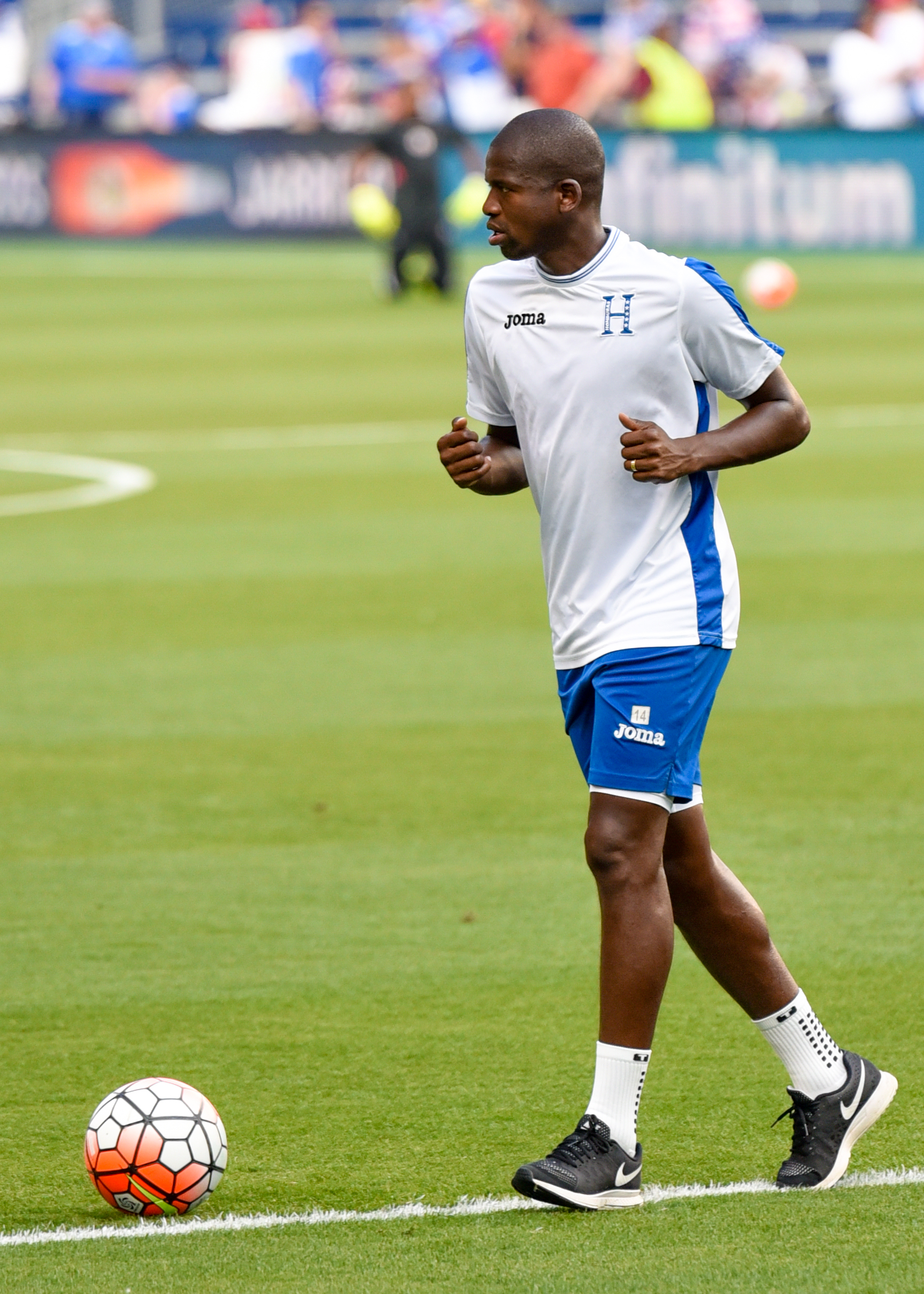
- García with Honduras in 2015

Personal information
- Full name: Óscar Boniek García Ramírez
- Date of birth: September 4, 1984 (age 42)
- Place of birth: Tegucigalpa, Honduras
- Height: 1.75 m (5 ft 9 in)
- Position: Midfielder

Youth career
- 2003: Real Patepluma

Senior career*
| Years | Team | Apps | (Gls) |
| 2004–2012 | Olimpia | 115 | (14) |
| 2006–2007 | → Marathón (loan) | 11 | (0) |
| 2012–2021 | Houston Dynamo | 235 | (13) |
| 2022–2023 | Olimpia | 39 | (1) |
| Total | | 400 | (28) |

International career^{‡}
| 2005–2021 | Honduras | 134 | (3) |
- * Club domestic league appearances and goals as of 4 July 2023 ‡ National team caps and goals as of 2 December 2021

Óscar Boniek García Ramírez (born 4 September 1984) is a Honduran former professional footballer who played as a midfielder. Before moving to the United States, García had a successful career in Honduras with Olimpia and Marathón, winning eight league titles. He earned over 130 caps for the Honduras national team and is the fourth most capped player in the country's history and has the fourth most appearances in Houston Dynamo history.

== Club career ==
García made his senior debut on August 10, 2003, with Real Patepluma, losing 4–1 to Atlético Olanchano. In 2004, he joined Olimpia of Honduras. He also played for Marathón of Honduras. He also went for a 15-day trial with French club Paris Saint Germain and played two friendly games with the team that toured Portugal to play against Vitória Guimarães and Benfica.

During August 2009, it was announced that he would travel to Wigan Athletic, who were in England's Premier League at the time, in order to sign a three-year contract with the club, along with fellow Honduran, Roger Rojas. The contract was not signed and García stayed with Olimpia.

On June 7, 2012, García signed with Major League Soccer club Houston Dynamo to become their 2nd ever Designated Player. He made his Dynamo debut on June 30 in a 2–0 win over the Philadelphia Union. On July 15, 2012, he scored his first goal in a Dynamo jersey and in Major League Soccer against D.C. United in the 62nd minute. García's impact was immense, with the Dynamo having a +10 goal differential and a record of 9-4-6 after he joined the team. On August 30, García returned to Olimpia as the Dynamo traveled to Honduras to face his old club in the 2012-13 CONCACAF Champions League. He would play all 90 minutes as Houston earned a 1–1 draw. On November 26, 2012, García was awarded the "Newcomer of the Year" and "Player's Player of the Year" award by the team, despite playing only half of the season. García was also named the MLS Latin Player of the Year, as voted on by fans. He helped the team reach MLS Cup in 2012, where the Dynamo would fall to the LA Galaxy 3–1.

On October 27, 2013, García scored in a 2–1 win over DC United in a game that clinched the Dynamo's spot in the 2013 MLS Cup Playoffs. He scored again on October 31 in a 3–0 win over the Montreal Impact in the first game of the playoffs. In the second leg of the conference finals, García scored in the 3rd minute to give the Dynamo a 1–0 lead on aggregate. However, Sporting Kansas City would come back and win 2–1.

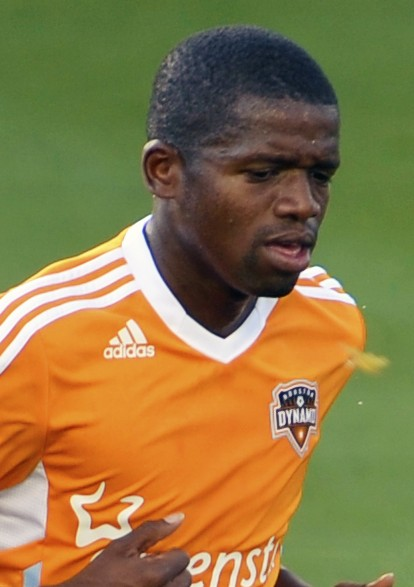
García playing with the Dynamo in 2012

2014 was a mixed year for García. He got to represent Honduras at the 2014 FIFA World Cup, but the Dynamo missed out on a playoff spot by 10 points, in part because the team struggled when García missed games for international duty. However, his volley against the Chicago Fire on September 28 was named the Dynamo's Goal of the Year.

The Dynamo would miss out on the playoffs in 2015 and 2016, but García helped lead them to a return in 2017 under new coach Wilmer Cabrera. Although he only made 12 starts on the year, his fewest since joining the Dynamo, García was an important leader in the locker room and on the field. He signed a new contract with Houston on 11 December 2017.

2018 saw García and the Dynamo fail to qualify for the playoffs, however he would make 3 appearances in the US Open Cup, including a start in the final, as Houston won the tournament for the first time in club history. The win qualified them for the 2019 CONCACAF Champions League, returning to the competition for the first time since 2013.

García made his first appearance of the season on 26 February, coming on as a substitute in a 2–1 win over C.D. Guastatoya in a Champions League match. He picked up his first assist on 18 May in a 2–1 win over D.C. United. On 29 September, García made his 200th MLS appearance for the Dynamo, becoming the 4th player in club history to reach that milestone. 2019 saw a personal resurgence for García, playing the most minutes of his Dynamo career and bringing energy to the middle of the pitch. However, the Dynamo would miss out on the playoffs once again. On 20 December he signed a one-year contract to remain in Houston.

García started the first 5 games of the 2020 season for the Dynamo, however he would only start 2 games the rest of the year, primarily featuring as a substitute. Garcia played in 18 games, 7 of them starts, out of a possible 23 in a shortened 2020 season due to the COVID-19 pandemic. It was another poor season for the Dynamo, missing out on the playoffs for the third straight season. His contract was initially not renewed by Houston following their 2020 season. However, a new one-year deal was agreed on 15 February 2021.

On 16 April, in the opening match of the 2021 season, the Dynamo defeated the San Jose Earthquakes 2–1, with García playing the full match as a centerback due to injuries to Houston's other centerbacks. He was named to the MLS Team of the Week following the game. García made 16 appearances during the 2021 season, 6 as a centerback, as Houston finished last in the Western Conference for the second consecutive season. On 15 November, Houston Dynamo announced that García will no longer continue on with the club for 2022, choosing to rescind his contract, and enter free agency. He left Houston tied for the 3rd most appearances and with the 2nd most assists in team history.

== International career ==
García made his debut for Honduras in a July 2005 friendly match against Canada and has played at the 2007, 2009, and 2011 UNCAF Nations Cups as well as at the 2005, 2007, and 2011 CONCACAF Gold Cups. García helped Honduras win the 2011 Copa Centroamericana finish second at the 2013 Copa Centroamericana. He was also a non-playing squad member at the 2010 FIFA World Cup in South Africa. He played in all three Group E matches for Honduras at the 2014 FIFA World Cup in Brazil including against France when he came on as a substitute. García earned his 100th cap for Honduras on 4 September 2015 in a 3–0 win against Venezuela. As of 2017, García had the 4th most caps for Honduras with 125 caps. He returned to play for the national team in a friendly match against Guatemala on 15 November 2020, after three years of absence.

== Personal life ==
He was given the middle name Boniek in honour of Zbigniew Boniek, the famous Polish international footballer. García's father was a professional footballer for Olimpia. He chose to have the name "Boniek" written across the back of his shirt while playing for Houston. He and his wife Ivania Reyes have a daughter and twin sons.

Every offseason, García returns home to do charitable work in Honduras. First inspired by former Honduran international Víctor Bernárdez, he collected toys for children dealing with cancer. He has also donated school supplies and clothes to underprivileged children in Honduras, as well as doing charitable work in the Houston area throughout the year. Following Hurricane Eta hitting Honduras in 2020, he and fellow Honduran international footballers worked to raise money for those affected by the storm.

García holds a U.S. green card which qualifies him as a domestic player for MLS team purposes.

== Coaching career ==
Was the head coach for Lutheran South Academy's Junior Varsity team for the 2023 season.

== Career statistics ==
=== Club ===
As of 2 December 2021

Appearances, goals, and assists by club, season and competition
| Club | Season | League | | | | Playoffs | | | US Open Cup | | | Continental | | | Total | | |
| Club | Season | Division | Apps | Goals | Assists | Apps | Goals | Assists | Apps | Goals | Assists | Apps | Goals | Assists | Apps | Goals | Assists |
|---|---|---|---|---|---|---|---|---|---|---|---|---|---|---|---|---|---|
| Houston Dynamo | 2012 | MLS | 17 | 4 | 6 | 6 | 1 | 1 | 0 | 0 | 0 | 2 | 0 | 0 | 25 | 5 | 7 |
| Houston Dynamo | 2013 | MLS | 22 | 3 | 6 | 5 | 2 | 0 | 0 | 0 | 0 | 4 | 0 | 0 | 31 | 5 | 6 |
| Houston Dynamo | 2014 | MLS | 27 | 2 | 1 | — | | | 0 | 0 | 0 | — | | | 27 | 2 | 1 |
| Houston Dynamo | 2015 | MLS | 23 | 3 | 5 | — | | | 0 | 0 | 0 | — | | | 23 | 3 | 5 |
| Houston Dynamo | 2016 | MLS | 31 | 0 | 9 | — | | | 3 | 0 | 1 | — | | | 34 | 0 | 10 |
| Houston Dynamo | 2017 | MLS | 20 | 0 | 4 | 2 | 0 | 0 | 1 | 0 | 0 | — | | | 23 | 0 | 4 |
| Houston Dynamo | 2018 | MLS | 29 | 1 | 7 | — | | | 3 | 0 | 0 | — | | | 32 | 1 | 7 |
| Houston Dynamo | 2019 | MLS | 32 | 0 | 1 | — | | | 2 | 0 | 0 | 3 | 0 | 0 | 37 | 0 | 1 |
| Houston Dynamo | 2020 | MLS | 18 | 0 | 0 | — | | | — | | | — | | | 18 | 0 | 0 |
| Houston Dynamo | 2021 | MLS | 16 | 0 | 0 | — | | | — | | | — | | | 16 | 0 | 0 |
| Career totals | | | 235 | 13 | 39 | 13 | 3 | 1 | 9 | 0 | 1 | 9 | 0 | 0 | 266 | 16 | 41 |

=== International ===
As of 2 December 2021

Appearances and goals by national team and year

| National team | Year | Apps | Goals |
|---|---|---|---|
| Honduras | 2005 | 7 | 0 |
| Honduras | 2006 | 4 | 0 |
| Honduras | 2007 | 17 | 0 |
| Honduras | 2008 | 4 | 0 |
| Honduras | 2009 | 8 | 0 |
| Honduras | 2010 | 8 | 1 |
| Honduras | 2011 | 14 | 0 |
| Honduras | 2012 | 11 | 0 |
| Honduras | 2013 | 16 | 1 |
| Honduras | 2014 | 8 | 0 |
| Honduras | 2015 | 12 | 0 |
| Honduras | 2016 | 7 | 1 |
| Honduras | 2017 | 9 | 0 |
| Honduras | 2018 | 0 | 0 |
| Honduras | 2019 | 0 | 0 |
| Honduras | 2020 | 1 | 0 |
| Honduras | 2021 | 8 | 0 |
| Total | | 134 | 3 |

==== Goals ====
Scores and results list Honduras' goal tally first.

| # | Date | Venue | Opponent | Score | Result | Competition |
|---|---|---|---|---|---|---|
| 1. | September 4, 2010 | Los Angeles Memorial Coliseum, Los Angeles, USA | El Salvador | 1–1 | 2–2 | Friendly |
| 2. | June 11, 2013 | Estadio Tiburcio Carías Andino, Tegucigalpa, Honduras | Jamaica | 2–0 | 2–0 | 2014 FIFA World Cup qualification |
| 3. | March 29, 2016 | Estadio Olímpico Metropolitano, San Pedro Sula, Honduras | El Salvador | 1–0 | 2–0 | 2018 FIFA World Cup qualification |

== Honours ==
Olimpia

- Liga Profesional de Honduras (8): 2004–05 C, 2005–06 A, 2005–06 C, 2007–08 C, 2008–09 C, 2009–10 C, 2011–12 A, 2011–12 C

Houston Dynamo

- US Open Cup (1): 2018
- MLS Eastern Conference (1): 2012

Honduras

- Copa Centroamericana (1): 2011

Individual

- Dynamo Newcomer of the Year: 2012
- Dynamo Player's Player of the Year: 2012
- MLS Latin Player of the Year (Latino del Año): 2012
- Dynamo Goal of the Year: 2014

== See also ==
- List of men's footballers with 100 or more international caps
