= Ben Hollingsworth (soccer) =

American soccer player

Personal information
- Date of birth: June 6, 1982 (age 44)
- Place of birth: Mount Pleasant, SC, United States
- Position: Midfielder

Youth career
- College of Charleston

Senior career*
Years	Team	Apps	(Gls)
2005–2006	Charleston Battery	56	(17)
2007	Maccabi Tel Aviv	0	(0)
- * Club domestic league appearances and goals

Ben Hollingsworth (born June 6, 1982) is an American former soccer player who works as an artist.
