= Charleston Battery =

American professional soccer club based in Charleston

- Full name: Charleston Battery
- Nicknames: Black and Yellow, Battery, Holy City FC
- Founded: 1993 (33 years ago)
- Stadium: Patriots Point Soccer Complex; Mount Pleasant, South Carolina
- Capacity: 3,900 (5,000)
- Owner: Rob Salvatore
- Head coach: Ben Pirmann
- League: USL Championship
- 2025: 2nd, Eastern Conference; Playoffs: USL Championship Conference Quarter-Final
- Website: charlestonbattery.com
| Home colors | Away colors |

The Charleston Battery are an American professional soccer club based in the Charleston metropolitan area, and member of the USL Championship. Founded in 1993, the Battery are the oldest continuously operating professional soccer club in the United States.

Charleston are one of the more successful lower-division soccer clubs in the United States, having won four league titles. The Battery won the USISL Pro League in 1996, the USL A-League in 2003, the USL Second Division in 2010 (where they also won the regular season title), and the USL Championship in 2012. They were also crowned the USL Championship Eastern Conference champions and league finalists in 2023. Charleston are also the most successful club in the history of the supporter-led Southern Derby competition with 10 first-place finishes.

The Battery have become renowned for their list of alumni to play at the next level, domestically and abroad. These players who were developed at Charleston include Fidel Barajas, Ozzie Alonso, Lamar Neagle, Maikel Chang, Dante Polvara, Trey Muse and Brian Anunga, among others.

Charleston Battery currently play at Patriots Point Soccer Complex in Mount Pleasant, South Carolina. Previously, the club played its home games at the soccer-specific MUSC Health Stadium in the Daniel Island section of Charleston from 1999 to 2019. The team's colors are black and yellow, with a traditional red scheme for away uniforms. From 2004 through the 2021 season, their head coach and general manager was Mike Anhaeuser.

== History ==
Charleston Battery was formed in 1993 by an ownership group of local soccer enthusiasts led by Tony Bakker, a native of London who had relocated his software company Blackbaud to the Charleston area in 1989. The club hired experienced college coach and University of South Carolina graduate Tim Hankinson to develop the team, and Battery started as a member of the USISL, which eventually evolved and came to be known as the USL in 1995. The Battery won their first league championship in 1996 under Portuguese manager Nuno Pitteira, defeating the Charlotte Eagles 3–2 in the final. In 1997 Charleston became one of the original clubs of the newly branded A-League (later the USL First Division).

In 1999 Charleston Battery moved into what is now known as MUSC Health Stadium, becoming the first non-Major League Soccer professional club in the United States to build its own stadium, and forged a reputation as one of the country's most well-established lower division clubs. The Battery hired veteran English coach Alan Dicks and signed many experienced domestic players such as Paul Conway, Dan Calichman and Eric Wynalda while also bringing in notable foreign signings such as Terry Phelan and Raúl Díaz Arce. In 2001 Dicks was replaced by fellow Englishman Chris Ramsey, who led Charleston to the A-League championship in 2003 with a 3–0 victory in the final over Minnesota Thunder in Charleston. Following Ramsey's departure in 2004, the club promoted longtime player and assistant coach Mike Anhaeuser to be the club's new coach.

In 2008 Charleston Battery reached the Lamar Hunt US Open Cup final for the first time, playing against Major League Soccer team D.C. United at RFK Stadium. In the final the Battery conceded an early goal but bounced back with a quick-fire equalizer through an Ian Fuller goal, assisted by Chris Williams. Later in the half Lazo Alavanja hit the post but at half time the scores were tied at 1–1. At the start of the second half Charleston conceded early again, but in the final seconds of extra time Marco Reda put the ball in the back of the net for Charleston, only to have his goal controversially disallowed as offside. D.C. United would go on to win the match 2–1.

In 2010 Charleston was invited by several other USL clubs to join the breakaway league eventually known as the North American Soccer League, but Battery chose to remain in the USL system and self-relegate to the USL Second Division, which eventually became the chief USL professional division. In their first third division season in 2010, Charleston led the league standings for the entire year and went undefeated at home. Charleston defeated the Richmond Kickers 2–1 in the final to claim the club's third league championship. Lamar Neagle was named the USL-2 league MVP and lead the league in scoring with 13 league goals. Anhaeuser was named the league's coach of the year, his second time receiving the honor. In 2012 Charleston Battery won their fourth league title in club history, defeating local rivals Wilmington Hammerheads 1–0 in the final. Micheal Azira scored a 74th-minute winner after Jose Cuevas slipped a pass to him on the left side of the penalty area.

In recent years Charleston Battery have had loan affiliations with several Major League Soccer clubs, beginning with a one-year deal to become the USL Pro affiliate of Vancouver Whitecaps FC in 2014. For the 2015 season, Battery signed a one-year deal to affiliate with the Houston Dynamo. On January 15, 2016, it was announced that the club would be partnering with the Atlanta United FC for the 2016 MLS season prior to Atlanta's entry to MLS in 2017.

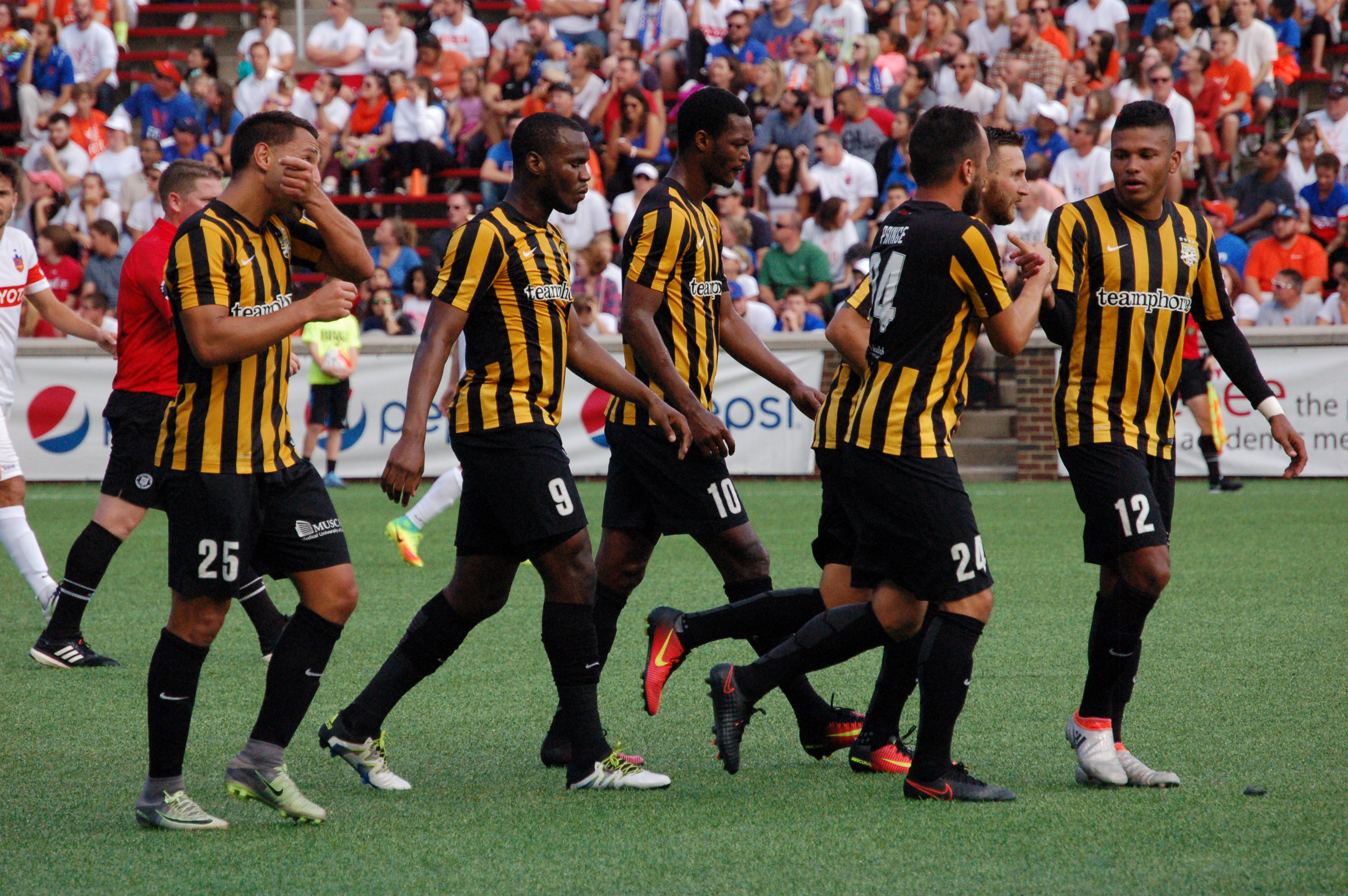
The Charleston Battery in October 2016, following a goal during the 2016 USL Playoffs against FC Cincinnati.

In February 2016, it was announced that longtime majority owner Tony Bakker had sold the club to B Sports Entertainment, an investment group led by local tech executives. Club president Andrew Bell and coach Mike Anhaeuser remained in charge of team operations after the ownership transition. In early 2018 it was announced that Bell would be leaving the club to take over operations of an announced USL expansion club in Memphis, Tennessee, ending a two-decade career in the Charleston front office. Bell was replaced by club operations officer Mike Kelleher.

In October 2019, it was announced that B Sports Entertainment had sold the club to Rob Salvatore of HCFC, LLC with a move to Patriots Point Soccer Complex in Mount Pleasant.

At the conclusion of the 2021 season, the Battery announced on November 1, 2021, that the club and Mike Anhaeuser had parted ways. Anhaeuser joined the Charleston Battery as a player in 1994, and switched into a coaching role in 1999. In 2004, he was named head coach of the club and led Charleston Battery to a U.S. Open Cup Final appearance in 2008 as well as two USL Championships in 2010 and 2012.

On December 20, 2021, Battery announced that they had hired Conor Casey as head coach. However, on October 12, 2022, with one match remaining in the season and the Battery near the bottom of the Eastern Conference standings, the club and Casey opted to part ways by mutual agreement. Assistant coach Dennis Sanchez was named interim head coach while a search for a permanent replacement began.

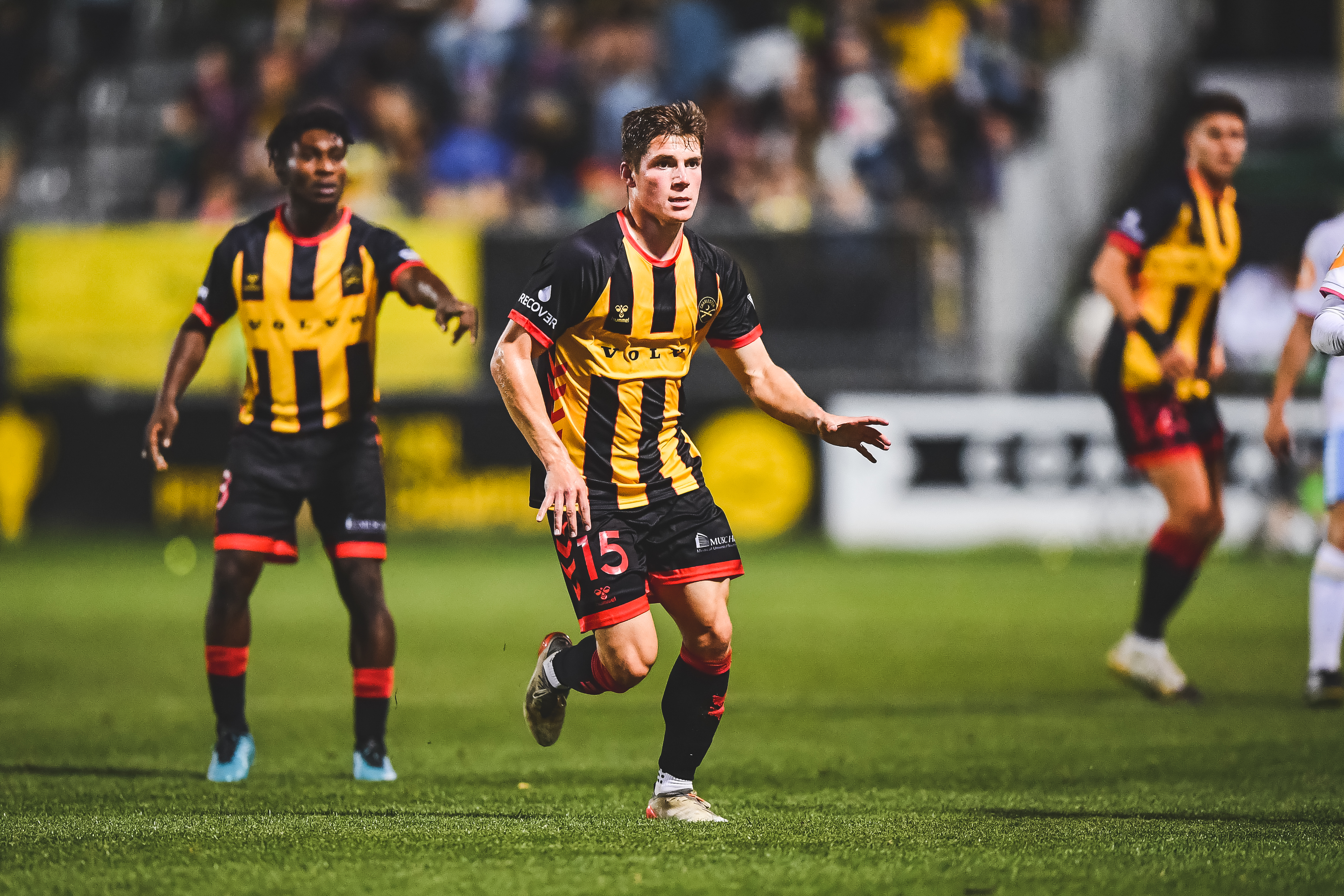
A 2022 Charleston Battery home match against the Las Vegas Lights.

On November 17, 2022, Battery announced that they had hired Memphis 901 FC head coach Ben Pirmann for the same position in Charleston. Pirmann was named the 2022 USL Championship Coach of the Year after leading Memphis to a second-place finish in the Eastern Conference and a spot in the conference semifinals.

In 2023, the Battery bounced back with the best turnaround campaign in USL Championship history, amassing a 17-9-8 record in the regular season to finish third in the conference, a 34-point improvement from 2022. Charleston won a league-best 29 points away from home and tied for the most road wins (eight), along with winning 16 points from losing positions (sixth-most in the league). The Battery advanced to the 2023 USL Championship Final after defeating Indy, Birmingham and Louisville in the earlier rounds to claim the Eastern Conference title, the club's first trophy since 2012. Charleston were narrow runners-up in the Final to Phoenix Rising FC at home. The season was highlighted by the break-out campaigns of Fidel Barajas, Nick Markanich, Derek Dodson, Dante Polvara and Trey Muse, and Augustine Williams was the top scorer for a second consecutive year. Barajas matched the single-season assists record with 11, became the club's youngest all-time goalscorer, and was named the USL Championship Young Player of the Year and All-League Second Team. Pirmann was named a finalist for Coach of the Year.

Barajas and Muse were sold to MLS sides Real Salt Lake and Portland Timbers, respectively, in the following offseason prior to the 2024 campaign.

== Colors and badge ==
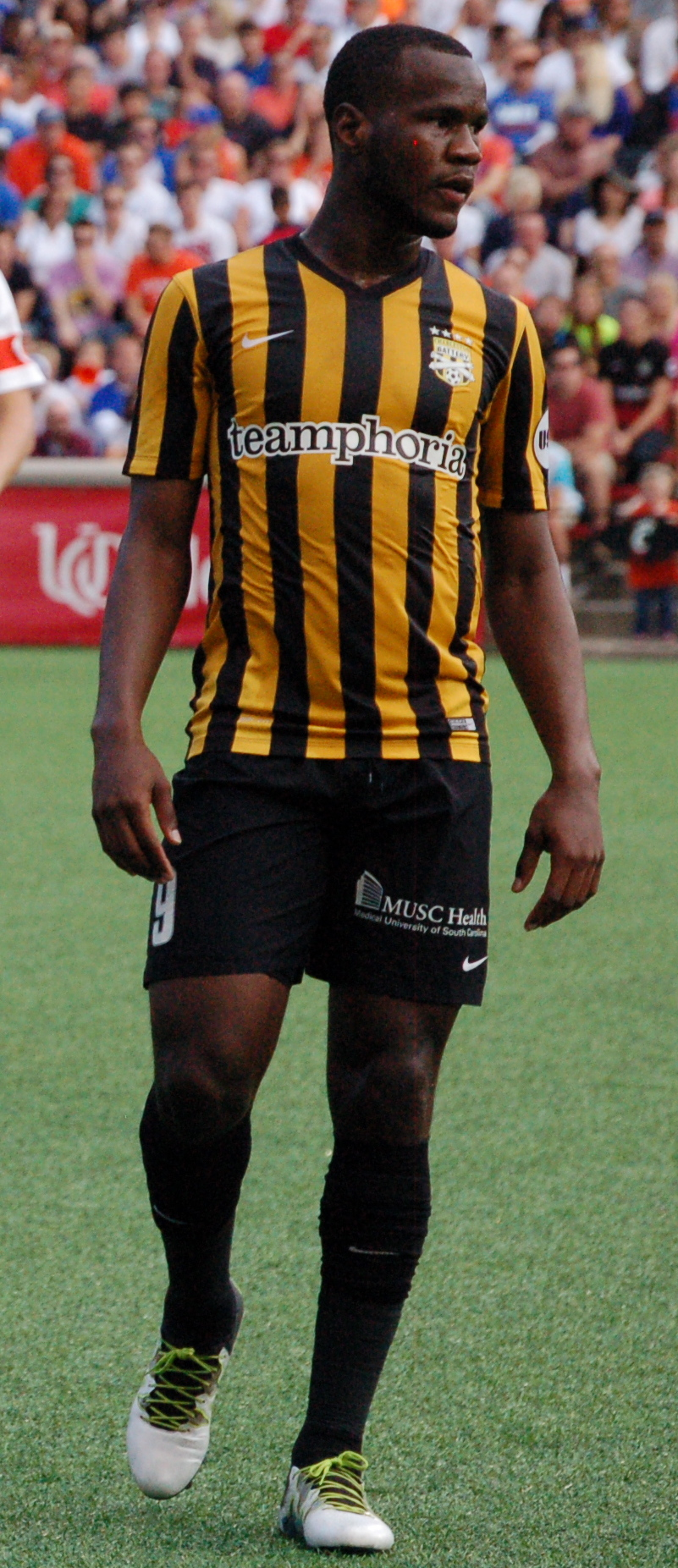
Romario Williams wearing a typical example of a Charleston Battery jersey with the old logo

Charleston's traditional colors are yellow, black and red. In Charleston Battery's first few seasons, the home kit was typically black and white with a red accent. Beginning in 1997 the club began using black with yellow stripes, which has remained in use as the home jersey ever since. The Charleston away kit has typically been a combination of red, white and black, though for the 2017 season the away kit is either the 25 Anniversary black and silver combination, or white and black.

The club badge remained the same iconic logo from 1993 through the 2019 season, other than minor adjustments in color, resolution and the addition of four stars representing each of the team's league championships. It is a classic shield in the club's signature yellow and black stripes, featuring a pair of crossed artillery cannons (alluding to the city's naval history and current presence) above a depiction of a football ball.

In December 2019, the club unveiled the new branding for 2020 and moving forward. Matthew Wolff, who has designed a number of logos for soccer clubs around the world, was instrumental in working with Battery ownership to create a modern representation of Charleston's crest. The new logo featured crossed cannons on a black circle, with the iconic crescent shape, with Charleston emblazoned across the top and 1993, the year the club was established at the bottom.

== Stadiums ==
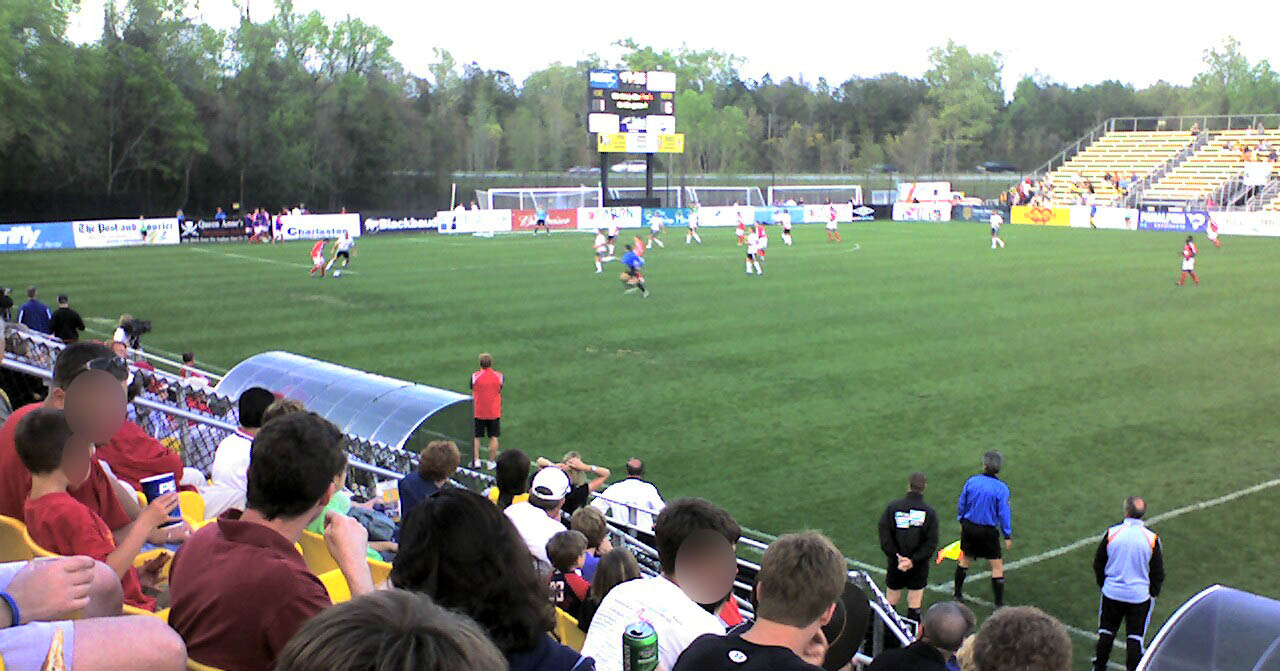
MUSC Health Stadium in 2007, the home of the Charleston Battery for twenty years

- Stoney Field; Charleston, South Carolina (1993–1998)
- MUSC Health Stadium (formerly Blackbaud Stadium); Daniel Island, Charleston, South Carolina (1999–2019)
- Patriots Point Soccer Complex; Mount Pleasant, South Carolina (from 2020)

Charleston Battery played their first six seasons in downtown Charleston at Stoney Field, a facility they shared with various college and high school sports teams.

The club moved to MUSC Health Stadium (previously known as Blackbaud Stadium) in the suburban Daniel Island area in 1999. The first privately funded soccer-specific stadium built in the United States, it seats 5,100 people. MUSC Health Stadium is modeled on lower level English soccer stadiums and features an on-site pub called The Three Lions behind the west stand. The stadium site also features a training field and club offices.

In 2016, the ownership built the second-largest video board in the Southeast. MUSC Health Stadium's jumbotron is 3,000 square feet. When comparing the square footage to stadium seats ratio, the video board is the largest in the world.

Additionally, the complex includes sky boxes, a plaza for corporate entertaining, and state-of-the-art media capabilities, making it one of the premier professional soccer venues in the U.S.

In 2019, under new ownership led by Rob Salvatore, the club announced that Charleston Battery would move off Daniel Island to Patriots Point in Mount Pleasant, South Carolina. The current stadium complex is home to the College of Charleston soccer, baseball and softball teams. Situated off the Ravenel Bridge in Mt. Pleasant, Battery's new stadium is back in the heart of Charleston. Patriots Point sits a short drive from all corners of the Holy City and minutes from bars, restaurants and attractions.

After extensive renovations and expansion in early 2020, Patriots Point opened to limited fans during the pandemic-shortened 2020 season. The stadium held its grand opening during the 2021 season as fans 'packed the Point' to cheer on the Black and Yellow. The ownership group has continued to expand developments at Patriots Point, with the introduction of premium seating options via shipping containers transformed into suite-like boxes with multiple levels. The stadium currently holds three "suite boxes" that fans can rent out for matches.

== Club culture ==
The independent supporters' group is The Regiment, who stand in Supporters Section directly behind the north goal of the stadium, along with other supporters' groups including the American Outlaws-affiliated Queen Anne's Revenge and the Spanish-speaking Charleston Barra Brava.

Charleston Battery competes for the Coffee Pot Cup every time it faces their rival team D.C. United of Major League Soccer, a trophy established by the two sides' supporters and currently held by DC. The clubs have regularly faced each other in friendlies and cup competitions, with the 2008 US Open Cup final remaining the highest profile match between the two clubs to date. Charleston are also longtime league rivals of the Richmond Kickers.

The supporters' groups compete with supporters of the North Carolina FC in the Southern Derby Cup, which Charleston Battery had won a record 10 times.

The supporters' groups compete with supporters of the Tampa Bay Rowdies, Ralph's Mob and the Skyway Casuals, in the No Quarter Derby.

Halfway through the 2021 season, the club introduced a cannon in the stadium to fire off after each Battery goal and at the start and end of matches.

Gray Television holds local media rights with an arrangement similar to USL club Phoenix Rising FC, which has rights with the various Arizona's Family Sports. WCSC 5.3 is the flagship station with games airing in the Columbia market on Gray station WIS 10.4.

== Players and staff ==
=== Current roster ===
As of March 31, 2026

Note: Flags indicate national team as defined under FIFA eligibility rules; some limited exceptions apply. Players may hold more than one non-FIFA nationality.

| No. | Pos. | Nation | Player |
|---|---|---|---|
| 1 | GK | USA | John Berner |
| 2 | DF | USA | Kruz Held |
| 3 | DF | USA | Nathan Messer |
| 4 | MF | ENG | Chris Allan |
| 5 | DF | USA | Sean Suber |
| 7 | DF | USA | Langston Blackstock |
| 8 | MF | USA | Emilio Ycaza |
| 9 | FW | COL | Camilo Sánchez |
| 10 | MF | CIV | Laurent Kissiedou |
| 12 | FW | USA | Alec Hughes |
| 13 | MF | COL | Wilmer Cabrera Jr. |
| 16 | DF | USA | Graham Smith |

| No. | Pos. | Nation | Player |
|---|---|---|---|
| 17 | MF | USA | Jack Wayne |
| 22 | DF | USA | Joey Akpunonu |
| 24 | GK | USA | Daniel Kuzemka |
| 29 | MF | USA | Jeremy Kelly |
| 30 | FW | USA | Colton Swan |
| 42 | FW | HON | Douglas Martínez |
| 56 | GK | USA | Luis Zamudio |
| 88 | MF | RUS | Kirill Pakhomov |
| 90 | FW | ESP | Miguel Berry |
| 91 | MF | CIV | Houssou Landry |
| 98 | GK | USA | Cohen Rigsby |
| 99 | FW | JAM | Maalique Foster |

=== Out on loan ===
Note: Flags indicate national team as defined under FIFA eligibility rules; some limited exceptions apply. Players may hold more than one non-FIFA nationality.

| No. | Pos. | Nation | Player |
|---|---|---|---|
| 27 | FW | CAN | Medgy Alexandre (on loan to Spokane Velocity) |
| 80 | MF | COL | Juan David Torres (on loan to Phoenix Rising) |

=== Staff ===
- (United States) Lee Cohen – Club President
- (United States) Ben Pirmann – Head Coach
- (Scotland) Ian Cameron – Assistant Coach
- (Scotland) Robbie Crawford – Assistant Coach
- (United States) Brian Jones – Assistant Coach
- (England) Rob Seaton – Assistant Coach
- (United States) Pete Calabrese – Performance Director
- (United States) Luke Cantin – Head Athletic Trainer

=== Notable former players ===
This list includes those former players who received international caps while playing for the team, made significant contributions to the team in terms of appearances or goals, or who made significant contributions to the sport either before they played for the team, or after they left. Notably absent is Cris Errazuriz who wore number 22 for the 1996 League champion squad.

- (United States) Nelson Akwari
- (Cuba) Osvaldo Alonso
- (United States) Mike Anhaeuser
- (Cameroon) Brian Anunga
- (United States) Lazo Alavanja
- (South Africa) Stephen Armstrong
- (Morocco) Khalil Azmi
- (Mexico) Fidel Barajas
- (United States) Dan Calichman
- (United States) Ted Chronopoulos
- (United States) Paul Conway
- (Jamaica) Omar Daley
- (El Salvador) Raúl Díaz Arce
- (Jamaica) Linval Dixon
- (Republic of Ireland) Colin Falvey
- (United States) Adam Grinwis
- (United States) Ben Hollingsworth
- (United States) Dusty Hudock
- (England) Lee Hurst
- (Haiti) Gilbert Jean-Baptiste
- (Jamaica) Dane Kelly
- (United States) Forrest Lasso
- (United States) Troy Lesesne
- (Canada) John Limniatis
- (United States) Nick Markanich
- (Cuba) Lester More
- (United States) Trey Muse
- (United States) Lamar Neagle
- (Nigeria) Patrick Olalere
- (United States) Bo Oshoniyi
- (Scotland) Nicki Paterson
- (Republic of Ireland) Terry Phelan
- (United States) Dante Polvara
- (United States) Zach Prince
- (England) Robert Rosario
- (Trinidad and Tobago) Brent Sancho
- (Jamaica) Dean Sewell
- (England) Nicky Spooner
- (United States) Temoc Suarez
- (Canada) Mark Watson
- (United States) John Wilson
- (United States) Eric Wynalda
- (Bulgaria) Velko Yotov
- (Jamaica) Paul Young

=== Head coaches ===
- (United States) Tim Hankinson (1993–1994)
- (Portugal) Nuno Piteira (1995–1999)
- (England) Alan Dicks (1999–2001)
- (England) Chris Ramsey (2001–2004)
- (United States) Mike Anhaeuser (2004–2021)
- (United States) Conor Casey (2022)
- (United States) Ben Pirmann (2023–Present)

=== Presidents ===
- (England) Tony Bakker (1993–1998)
- (England) Nigel Cooper (1999–2008)
- (England) Andrew Bell (2008–2018)
- (England) Mike Kelleher (2018–2019)
- (United States) Lee Cohen (2022–Present)

== Honors ==
- USISL Pro
  - Champions (1): 1996
  - Atlantic Division Champions (1): 1995
- USL A-League
  - Champions (1): 2003
  - Atlantic Division Champions (1): 2000
  - Southeast Division Champions (2): 2002, 2003
- USL Second Division
  - Champions (1): 2010
  - Regular Season Champions (1): 2010
- USL Championship
  - Champions (1): 2012
  - Runner Up (1): 2023
  - Eastern Conference Champions (Playoffs) (1): 2023
- U.S. Open Cup
  - Runner Up (1): 2008
  - Semifinals (2): 1999, 2004
  - Quarterfinals (3): 2007, 2009, 2010
- Southern Derby
  - Winner (10): 2003, 2005^, 2009^, 2010, 2011, 2015, 2016, 2017, 2020, 2024

^ as co-champions

- No Quarter Derby
  - Winner (4): 2020, 2022, 2023, 2024

== Record ==
=== Year-by-year ===
This is a partial list of the last five seasons completed by Charleston Battery. For the full season-by-season history, see List of Charleston Battery seasons.

| Season | League | | | | | | | | | | | Position | | Playoffs | USOC | Continental / Other | Average attendance | Top goalscorer(s) | |
| Season | Div | League | Pld | W | L | D | GF | GA | GD | Pts | PPG | Conf. | Overall | Playoffs | USOC | Continental / Other | Average attendance | Name | Goals |
|---|---|---|---|---|---|---|---|---|---|---|---|---|---|---|---|---|---|---|---|
| 2021 | 2 | USLC | 32 | 10 | 15 | 7 | 49 | 60 | −11 | 37 | 1.16 | 6th | 10th | DNQ | NH | DNQ | 2,771 | (Italy) Claudio Repetto | 9 |
| 2022 | 2 | USLC | 34 | 6 | 21 | 7 | 41 | 77 | −36 | 25 | 0.74 | 12th | 25th | DNQ | R2 | DNQ | 2,797 | (Sierra Leone) Augustine Williams | 16 |
| 2023 | 2 | USLC | 34 | 17 | 9 | 8 | 47 | 43 | +4 | 59 | 1.74 | 3rd | 4th | RU | R4 | DNQ | 3,113 | (Sierra Leone) Augustine Williams | 15 |
| 2024 | 2 | USLC | 34 | 18 | 6 | 10 | 68 | 35 | +33 | 64 | 1.88 | 2nd | 2nd | CF | Ro16 | DNQ | 3,645 | (United States) Nick Markanich | 28 |
| 2025 | 2 | USLC | 30 | 19 | 6 | 5 | 62 | 32 | +30 | 62 | 2.07 | 2nd | 2nd | QF | Ro32 | DNQ | 3,908 | (United States) Cal Jennings | 17 |

1. Avg. attendance include statistics from league matches only.
2. Top goalscorer(s) includes all goals scored in league play, playoffs, U.S. Open Cup, and other competitive matches.

=== Record vs. international and MLS teams ===
U.S. Open Cup record: 8–1–13 (W–D–L)
Carolina Challenge Cup record: 5–9–20
Exhibition record: 5–2–7

| Date | Competition | Location | Home team | Result | Away team |
|---|---|---|---|---|---|
| April 24, 1993 | Exhibition | Charleston, South Carolina | Charleston Battery | 2–0 | Constant Spring F.C. |
| May 5, 1993 | Exhibition | Charleston, South Carolina | Charleston Battery | 0–1 | FK-RAF, Latvia |
| April 2, 1994 | Exhibition | Charleston, South Carolina | Charleston Battery | 0–0 | Fort Lauderdale Strikers |
| April 24, 1996 | Exhibition | Charleston, South Carolina | Charleston Battery | 1–2 a.e.t. | U.S.A. men's u-23's |
| June 17, 1998 | Exhibition | Charleston, South Carolina | Charleston Battery | 1–0 | Tampa Bay Mutiny |
| August 4, 1999 | 1999 U.S. Open Cup | Blackbaud Stadium | Charleston Battery | 4–3 a.e.t. | D.C. United |
| September 1, 1999 | 1999 U.S. Open Cup | Virginia Beach Sportsplex | Colorado Rapids | 3–0 | Charleston Battery |
| May 1, 2000 | Exhibition | Charleston, South Carolina | Charleston Battery | 1–2 | Tampa Bay Mutiny |
| June 14, 2000 | 2000 U.S. Open Cup | Blackbaud Stadium | Charleston Battery | 0–4 | D.C. United |
| June 27, 2001 | 2001 U.S. Open Cup | Blackbaud Stadium | Charleston Battery | 4–1 | Metrostars |
| July 11, 2001 | 2001 U.S. Open Cup | Foxboro Stadium | New England Revolution | 2–1 | Charleston Battery |
| March 30, 2002 | Exhibition | Blackbaud Stadium | Charleston Battery | 4 – 1 | Dallas Burn |
| April 4, 2002 | Exhibition | Blackbaud Stadium | Charleston Battery | 1–2 | New England Revolution |
| July 17, 2002 | 2002 U.S. Open Cup | Blackbaud Stadium | Charleston Battery | 0–1 | Colorado Rapids |
| July 20, 2002 | Exhibition | Blackbaud Stadium | Charleston Battery | 2 – 1 | Puebla F.C. |
| March 23, 2003 | Exhibition | Blackbaud Stadium | Charleston Battery | 0–1 | D.C. United |
| March 20, 2004 | 2004 Carolina Challenge Cup | Blackbaud Stadium | Charleston Battery | 1–2 | D.C. United |
| March 24, 2004 | 2004 Carolina Challenge Cup | Blackbaud Stadium | Charleston Battery | 1–3 | Columbus Crew |
| July 17, 2004 | Exhibition | Blackbaud Stadium | Charleston Battery | 2–1 | Sunderland A.F.C. |
| July 20, 2004 | 2004 U.S. Open Cup | Blackbaud Stadium | Charleston Battery | 1–0 | Metrostars |
| August 25, 2004 | 2004 U.S. Open Cup | Benedetti–Wehrli Stadium | Chicago Fire | 1–0 | Charleston Battery |
| March 19, 2005 | 2005 Carolina Challenge Cup | Blackbaud Stadium | Charleston Battery | 0–1 | Columbus Crew |
| March 23, 2005 | 2005 Carolina Challenge Cup | Blackbaud Stadium | Charleston Battery | 2–2 | D.C. United |
| March 25, 2005 | 2005 Carolina Challenge Cup | Blackbaud Stadium | Charleston Battery | 0–1 | San Jose Earthquakes |
| March 18, 2006 | 2006 Carolina Challenge Cup | Blackbaud Stadium | Charleston Battery | 0–1 | Houston Dynamo |
| March 22, 2006 | 2006 Carolina Challenge Cup | Blackbaud Stadium | Charleston Battery | 1–0 | New York Red Bulls |
| March 25, 2006 | 2006 Carolina Challenge Cup | Blackbaud Stadium | Charleston Battery | 1–1 | D.C. United |
| August 2, 2006 | 2006 U.S. Open Cup | Blackbaud Stadium | Charleston Battery | 3–5 | FC Dallas |
| March 24, 2007 | 2007 Carolina Challenge Cup | Blackbaud Stadium | Charleston Battery | 0–1 | New York Red Bulls |
| March 28, 2007 | 2007 Carolina Challenge Cup | Blackbaud Stadium | Charleston Battery | 1–1 | Houston Dynamo |
| March 31, 2007 | 2007 Carolina Challenge Cup | Blackbaud Stadium | Charleston Battery | 0–3 | Toronto FC |
| July 10, 2007 | 2007 U.S. Open Cup | Blackbaud Stadium | Charleston Battery | 1–0 | Houston Dynamo |
| August 7, 2007 | 2007 U.S. Open Cup | Blackbaud Stadium | Charleston Battery | 1–2 | FC Dallas |
| March 15, 2008 | 2008 Carolina Challenge Cup | Blackbaud Stadium | Charleston Battery | 1–1 | New York Red Bulls |
| March 19, 2008 | 2008 Carolina Challenge Cup | Blackbaud Stadium | Charleston Battery | 1–2 | San Jose Earthquakes |
| March 22, 2008 | 2008 Carolina Challenge Cup | Blackbaud Stadium | Charleston Battery | 2–0 | Toronto FC |
| July 1, 2008 | 2008 U.S. Open Cup | Blackbaud Stadium | Charleston Battery | 5–4 | Houston Dynamo |
| July 8, 2008 | 2008 U.S. Open Cup | Pizza Hut Park | FC Dallas | 1–3 | Charleston Battery |
| September 3, 2008 | 2008 U.S. Open Cup | RFK Stadium | D.C. United | 2–1 | Charleston Battery |
| March 7, 2009 | 2009 Carolina Challenge Cup | Blackbaud Stadium | Charleston Battery | 1–2 | Toronto FC |
| March 11, 2009 | 2009 Carolina Challenge Cup | Blackbaud Stadium | Charleston Battery | 1–2 | Real Salt Lake |
| March 14, 2009 | 2009 Carolina Challenge Cup | Blackbaud Stadium | Charleston Battery | 0–2 | D.C. United |
| June 30, 2009 | 2009 U.S. Open Cup | Blackbaud Stadium | Charleston Battery | 3–1 | Chivas USA |
| July 7, 2009 | 2009 U.S. Open Cup | Blackbaud Stadium | Charleston Battery | 0–4 | Houston Dynamo |
| March 13, 2010 | 2010 Carolina Challenge Cup | Blackbaud Stadium | Charleston Battery | 0–0 | Toronto FC |
| March 17, 2010 | 2010 Carolina Challenge Cup | Blackbaud Stadium | Charleston Battery | 1–3 | Real Salt Lake |
| March 20, 2010 | 2010 Carolina Challenge Cup | Blackbaud Stadium | Charleston Battery | 0–2 | D.C. United |
| June 29, 2010 | 2010 U.S. Open Cup | Toyota Park | Chicago Fire | 0–0 pk (0–3) | Charleston Battery |
| July 6, 2010 | 2010 U.S. Open Cup | Columbus Crew Stadium | Columbus Crew | 3–0 | Charleston Battery |
| July 17, 2010 | Exhibition | Blackbaud Stadium | Charleston Battery | 0–2 | Bolton Wanderers |
| March 5, 2011 | 2011 Carolina Challenge Cup | Blackbaud Stadium | Charleston Battery | 1–2 | D.C. United |
| March 9, 2011 | 2011 Carolina Challenge Cup | Blackbaud Stadium | Charleston Battery | 2–1 | Toronto FC |
| March 12, 2011 | 2011 Carolina Challenge Cup | Blackbaud Stadium | Charleston Battery | 0–0 | Chicago Fire |
| July 27, 2011 | Exhibition | Blackbaud Stadium | Charleston Battery | 0–0 | Portsmouth F.C. |
| February 25, 2012 | 2012 Carolina Challenge Cup | Blackbaud Stadium | Charleston Battery | 2–2 | Columbus Crew |
| February 29, 2012 | 2012 Carolina Challenge Cup | Blackbaud Stadium | Charleston Battery | 1–3 | D.C. United |
| May 29, 2012 | 2012 U.S. Open Cup | Blackbaud Stadium | Charleston Battery | 0–3 | New York Red Bulls |
| February 16, 2013 | 2013 Carolina Challenge Cup | Blackbaud Stadium | Charleston Battery | 2–3 | Vancouver Whitecaps FC |
| February 20, 2013 | 2013 Carolina Challenge Cup | Blackbaud Stadium | Charleston Battery | 1–2 | Chicago Fire |
| February 23, 2013 | 2013 Carolina Challenge Cup | Blackbaud Stadium | Charleston Battery | 2–1 | Houston Dynamo |
| May 28, 2013 | 2013 U.S. Open Cup | Blackbaud Stadium | Charleston Battery | 1–0 | San Jose Earthquakes |
| June 12, 2013 | 2013 U.S. Open Cup | Rio Tinto Stadium | Real Salt Lake | 5–2 a.e.t. | Charleston Battery |
| February 22, 2014 | 2014 Carolina Challenge Cup | Blackbaud Stadium | Charleston Battery | 1–2 | Seattle Sounders FC |
| February 26, 2014 | 2014 Carolina Challenge Cup | Blackbaud Stadium | Charleston Battery | 1–1 | D.C. United |
| March 1, 2014 | 2014 Carolina Challenge Cup | Blackbaud Stadium | Charleston Battery | 0–2 | Houston Dynamo |
| February 21, 2015 | 2015 Carolina Challenge Cup | Blackbaud Stadium | Charleston Battery | 1–0 | Houston Dynamo |
| February 25, 2015 | 2015 Carolina Challenge Cup | Blackbaud Stadium | Charleston Battery | 1–1 | Orlando City SC |
| February 28, 2015 | 2015 Carolina Challenge Cup | Blackbaud Stadium | Charleston Battery | 0–3 | New York City FC |
| June 17, 2015 | 2015 U.S. Open Cup | Blackbaud Stadium | Charleston Battery | 4–4 pk (7–8) | Orlando City SC |
| July 17, 2015 | Exhibition | Blackbaud Stadium | Charleston Battery | 1–2 | West Bromwich Albion |
| June 14, 2017 | 2017 U.S. Open Cup | Fifth Third Bank Stadium | Atlanta United FC | 3–2 | Charleston Battery |
| June 6, 2018 | 2018 U.S. Open Cup | Fifth Third Bank Stadium | Atlanta United FC | 3–0 | Charleston Battery |
| June 13, 2019 | 2019 U.S. Open Cup | Fifth Third Bank Stadium | Charleston Battery | 1–3 | Atlanta United FC |

== See also ==
- Battery Park
- Carolina Challenge Cup

| Preceded by Long Island Rough Riders | USISL Pro League (USL-2) Winner; 1996 | Succeeded by Albuquerque Geckos |
| Preceded by Milwaukee Rampage | USL A-League (USL-1) Champions; 2003 | Succeeded by Montreal Impact |
| Preceded by Orlando City | USL Pro Champions; 2012 | Succeeded by Orlando City |
| Preceded by Atlanta Silverbacks | Southern Derby Winner; 2003 | Succeeded by Atlanta Silverbacks |
| Preceded by Atlanta Silverbacks | Southern Derby Winner; Co-winners with Atlanta Silverbacks; 2005 | Succeeded by Atlanta Silverbacks |
