= MUSC Health Stadium =

Former soccer stadium in the US

- Battery Park

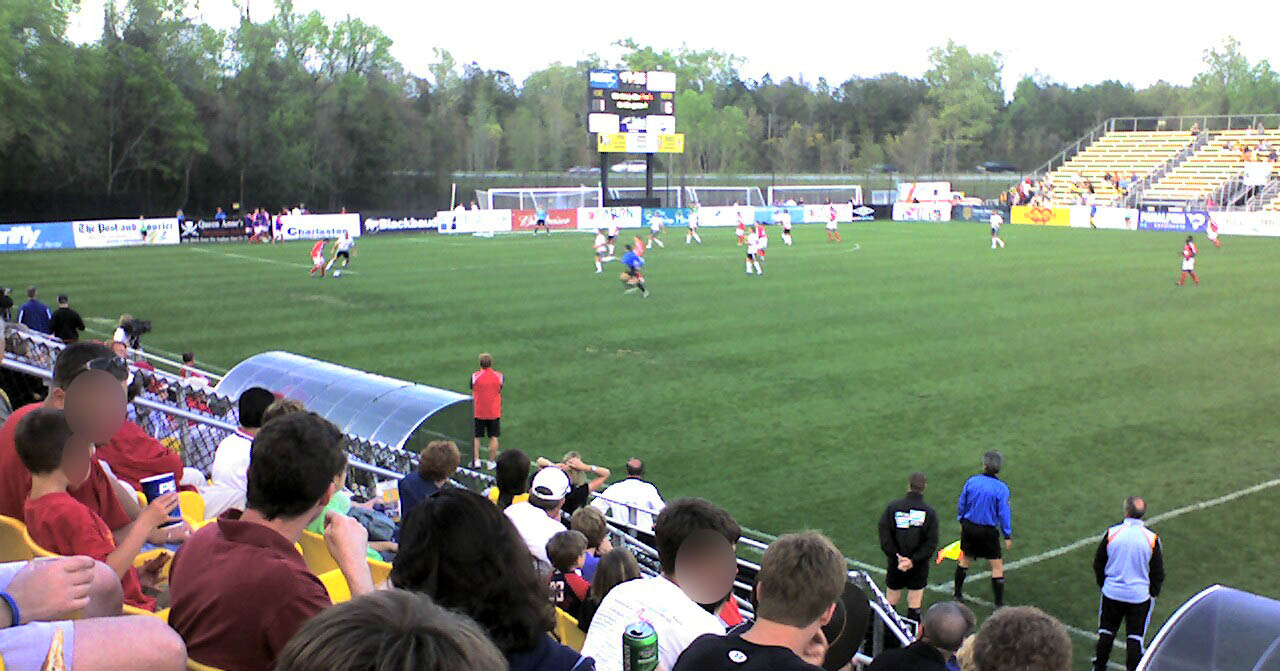
- The stadium during a match in 2007
- Interactive map of MUSC Health Stadium
- Former names: Blackbaud Stadium (1999–2015)
- Location: 1990 Daniel Island Drive; Charleston, South Carolina 29492
- Coordinates: 32.8702487°N 79.919538°W
- Owner: Charleston Battery
- Operator: Charleston Battery
- Capacity: 5,100
- Type: Soccer-specific stadium
- Surface: Grass

Construction
- Groundbreaking: 1998
- Opened: 1999
- Closed: October 19, 2019; 6 years ago
- Demolished: 2021
- Cost: $5.7 million USD

Tenant
- Charleston Battery (USLC) (1999–2019)

MUSC Health Stadium was a soccer-specific stadium located in the Daniel Island area of Charleston, South Carolina that served as the home of the Charleston Battery of the USL Championship.

Originally named "Blackbaud Stadium", the stadium was opened in 1999. At the time, Blackbaud was the first modern-era stadium in the United States designed for specifically soccer, as Columbus Crew Stadium opened after Blackbaud later that the same year. The stadium was originally named after Blackbaud, a software company founded by Battery majority owner Tony Bakker. The company's headquarters were adjacent to the stadium.

The stadium seated 5,100 people, mostly in two large stands on either side of the field. The stadium is modeled after lower-division English soccer stadiums and featured an on-site pub, called "The Three Lions".

The stadium regularly hosted sporting events besides Battery matches, including United States women's national soccer team soccer, and United States national rugby union team matches. The stadium also hosts concerts and other festivals, including several editions of the Southern Ground Music and Food Festival headlined by the Zac Brown Band.

In early 2008, the Battery announced a plan to convert much of the stadium to solar energy. The panels could offset up to 12 tons of carbon dioxide per year.

On July 30, 2015, the Battery sold naming rights for the stadium to the Medical University of South Carolina through 2019, in an expansion of a partnership between the university's hospital system and the team.

In August 2018, the stadium hosted the Major League Lacrosse league championship game. It was the first MLL game held in South Carolina.

The Southern Ground Music and Food Festival was hosted in 2011: Zac Brown Band, Clay Cook, Eric Church, Warren Haynes, Blue Dogs (from Charleston), Moon Taxi, My Morning Jacket, Train, and Fitz and the Tantrums. In 2012, the festival had: Gregg Allman Band, The Avett Brothers, Charlie Daniels Band, Grace Potter & the Nocturnals, and Michael Franti & Spearhead. In 2013, the festival had Band of Horses, Jason Mraz, Willie Nelson, and Kenny Rogers. In 2016, it had Thomas Rhett, A Thousand Horses, Kacey Musgraves, The Marshall Tucker Band (from Spartanburg), and Bruce Hornsby. Zac Brown Band played at the festival every year from 2011–2016.

On May 29, 2019, MUSC Health Stadium was sold to an affiliate of Atlanta-based Holder Properties Inc for $6.475 million. After the 2019 USL Championship season, the stadium was demolished to make way for commercial redevelopment. The final Battery game at the stadium took place on October 19, 2019 against Bethlehem Steel FC.

== USA Eagles Internationals ==
USA scores displayed first.

Date	Opponents	Final score	Competition	Attendance
4 July 2009	Canada	19 – 12	2011 Rugby World Cup qualifying	3,386
17 August 2013	Canada	9 – 27	2015 Rugby World Cup qualifying	5,258
