= 2010 Charleston Battery season =

Charleston Battery
2010 season
- Owner: Tony Bakker
- Manager: Michael Anhaeuser
- USL Second Division: 1st place
- U.S. Open Cup: Quarter-finals
- USL Second Division Playoffs: Champions
- Top goalscorer: League: Neagle (13); All: Neagle (14)
- Highest home attendance: 4,236
- Lowest home attendance: 797
- Average home league attendance: 3,247
Home colours	Away colours

The 2010 Charleston Battery season was the club's seventeenth year of professional soccer. The team played in the USL Second Division (USL-2), the third tier of the American soccer pyramid, having voluntarily self-relegated from the USL First Division at the end of the 2009 season. Charleston played its home games at Blackbaud Stadium on Daniel Island. The team was coached by Michael Anhaeuser, in his sixth year as head coach, and was assisted by former Battery player Ian Fuller. The Battery finished the regular season in first place with a record of 11–4–5, 38 points, and hosted the USL-2 championship match at Blackbaud Stadium on August 28, 2010. Charleston finished the regular season without a home defeat. The Battery defeated the Richmond Kickers 2–1 to win their third league title. Lamar Neagle led the USL-2 in scoring with 13 league goals and was named the league MVP. Battery manager Mike Anhaeuser was named the league's manager of the year.

== Preseason ==
The Battery began their annual Carolina Challenge Cup tournament with a match against Major League Soccer side Toronto FC. The Battery played Toronto to a draw, and would go on to lose 1-3 to Real Salt Lake, and 0-2 to D.C. United.

Results

March 13, 2010	Toronto FC	0–0	Charleston Battery	Charleston, South Carolina
19:15		Report		Stadium: Blackbaud Stadium

March 17, 2010	Charleston Battery	1–3	Real Salt Lake	Charleston, South Carolina
17:00	Mayard 36'	Report	Findley 10'; Espindola 76', 90+1'	Stadium: Blackbaud Stadium

March 20, 2010	D.C. United	2–0	Charleston Battery	Charleston, South Carolina
19:15	Moreno 33', 45' (pen.)	Report #1; Report #2		Stadium: Blackbaud Stadium

== Regular season ==
The Battery began the 2010 season with a road match at the Charlotte Eagles, winning 3–2.

April 17, 2010	Charlotte Eagles	2 - 3	Charleston Battery	Matthews, North Carolina
7:00 PM	Bryant (yellow card) 40'; Page 45'; Ogunseye 78'	Report	Melia (yellow card) 18'; Mayard 24'; Zaher 32'; Coleman 80'	Stadium: Restart Field; Attendance: 1,114; Referee: Abbas Pisan

April 24, 2010	Charleston Battery	0 - 0	Pittsburgh Riverhounds	Daniel Island, South Carolina
7:30 PM	Mayard (yellow card) 59'; Bermudez (yellow card) 77'; Woodbine (yellow card) 85'	Report	Salsi (yellow card) 10'	Stadium: Blackbaud Stadium; Attendance: 4,221; Referee: Eric Proctor

April 27, 2010	Real Maryland Monarchs	0 - 1	Charleston Battery	Rockville, Maryland
6:30 PM	Sesay (yellow card) 19'; Paterson (yellow card) 48'; Noviello (red card) 89'	Report	Heinemann 60'; Heinemann (yellow card) 74'	Stadium: Lester Stadium; Attendance: 300; Referee: Michael Donovan

May 1, 2010	Charleston Battery	2 - 1	Charlotte Eagles	Daniel Island, South Carolina
7:30 PM	Armstrong 6'; Neagle 15'; Falvey (yellow card) 53'; Bermudez (yellow card) 90'	Report	Lemons 58'	Stadium: Blackbaud Stadium; Attendance: 3,008; Referee: Mark Cleland

May 8, 2010	Charleston Battery	3 - 1	Harrisburg City Islanders	Daniel Island, South Carolina
7:30 PM	Neagle 23'; Heinemann (yellow card) 28'; Zaher (yellow card) 42'; Mayard 44'; Neagle (yellow card) 80'; Mayard 85'	Report	Bixler (yellow card) 43'; Hotchkin 65'; Hanley (yellow card) 71'; Pelletier (yellow card) 75'; Petrasso (yellow card) 77'	Stadium: Blackbaud Stadium; Attendance: 3,226; Referee: Serdar Ertep

May 15, 2010	Charleston Battery	2-1	Pittsburgh Riverhounds	Daniel Island, South Carolina
7:30 PM	Woodbine (yellow card) 14'; Gueye 28'; Hinemann 78'; Prince (yellow card) 90'		Rolko (yellow card) 19'; Deighton 68'; Katic (yellow card) 90'	Stadium: Blackbaud Stadium; Attendance: 4,236; Referee: Alan Schectman

May 21, 2010	Pittsburgh Riverhounds	3-4	Charleston Battery	Bridgeville, Pennsylvania
7:00 PM	Tobey (yellow card) 43'; Deighton 45'; Tobey 47'; Kuteny (yellow card) 57'; Weekes 59'		Gueye (yellow card) 15'; Neagle 20'; Hinemann 24'; Neagle (yellow card) 57'; Hinemann (yellow card) 76'; Nunes 83'; Falvey (yellow card) 87'; Neagle (red card) 90'	Stadium: Chartiers Valley High Stadium; Attendance: 962; Referee: Shawn Fitch

May 22, 2010	Harrisburg City Islanders	2-1	Charleston Battery	Harrisburg, Pennsylvania
7:00 PM	Bixler (yellow card) 41'; Bloes (yellow card) 48'; Blixer 58'; Zimmerman 78'		Neagle (yellow card) 37'; Prince (red card) 46'; Gueye (yellow card) 57'; Woodbine (yellow card) 73'; Jackson 78'; Hinemann (yellow card) 80'	Stadium: Skyline Sports Complex; Attendance: 1,657; Referee: Zach Rubinich

May 29, 2010	Charleston Battery	2-2	Real Maryland Monarchs	Daniel Island, South Carolina
7:30 PM	Neagle 52'; Falvey (yellow card) 63'; Neagle 90'		Trafford 6'; Hunter 41'; Bulow (yellow card) 90'	Stadium: Blackbaud Stadium; Attendance: 3,535; Referee: Daniel Burak

June 4, 2010	Charleston Battery	1-1	Harrisburg City Islanders	Daniel Island, South Carolina
7:30 PM	Bermudez (yellow card) 36'; Neagle 57'; Gueye (yellow card) 63'		Touray 42'	Stadium: Blackbaud Stadium; Attendance: 3,324; Referee: Patrick Baker

June 5, 2010	Richmond Kickers	3-1	Charleston Battery	Richmond, Virginia
7:00 PM	Görres (yellow card) 40'; Elcock 58'; Santos (yellow card) 68'; Foglesong 70'; Foglesong (yellow card) 71'; Görres 78'; Delicate (yellow card) 89'		Woodbine (yellow card) 75'; Gueye 81'; Marples (yellow card) 84'	Stadium: University of Richmond Stadium; Attendance: 2,037; Referee: Corey Parmer

June 11, 2010	Charleston Battery	4-1	Richmond Kickers	Daniel Island, South Carolina
7:30 PM	Neagle 10'; Neagle 12'; Heinemann 74'; Nunes (yellow card) 86'; Coleman (yellow card) 89'; Nunes 90'		Santos (yellow card) 33'; Görres (yellow card) 40'; Delicate 66'	Stadium: Blackbaud Stadium; Attendance: 3,937; Referee: Agostino Minasola

June 15, 2010, U.S. Open Cup	Charleston Battery	4-2	CASL Elite	Daniel Island, South Carolina
1:00 PM	Massie 7'; Coleman 12'; Prince 42'; Heinemann 68'		Merritt 53'; Coggins (yellow card) 76'; Swinehart 80'	Stadium: Blackbaud Stadium; Attendance: 797; Referee: Skye Arthur-Banning

June 22, 2010, U.S. Open Cup	Charleston Battery	2-1	Carolina Railhawks	Daniel Island, South Carolina
1:00 PM	Mayard 23'; Neagle 41'		Richardson (yellow card) 16'; Shields 64'	Stadium: Blackbaud Stadium; Attendance: 1,409; Referee: Mark Cleland

June 29, 2010, U.S. Open Cup	Chicago Fire	0-0 a.e.t. (0-3 PK)	Charleston Battery	Chicago, Illinois
1:00 PM	Nyarko (yellow card) 48'; Conde (yellow card) 70'; Watson (yellow card) 73'; Pappa (yellow card) 88'; McBride (penalty missed); Krol (penalty missed); Conde (penalty missed)		Armstrong (yellow card) 16'; Zahar (yellow card) 90'; Neagle (penalty scored); Zahar (penalty scored); Fuller (penalty scored)	Stadium: Toyota Park; Attendance: 2,526; Referee: Victor Hererra

July 3, 2010	Richmond Kickers	2-0	Charleston Battery	Richmond, Virginia
1:00 PM	Elcock 21'; Nsereko (yellow card) 51'; Santos 90'		Marples (yellow card) 18'	Stadium: University of Richmond Stadium; Attendance: 1,761; Referee: Kai Goodrich

July 6, 2010, U.S. Open Cup	Columbus Crew	3-0	Charleston Battery	Columbus, Ohio
7:00 PM	Zayner (yellow card) 24'; Rentaria 38'; Lenhart (yellow card) 42'; Lenhart 70'; Gaven 87'		Fuller (yellow card) 37'; Woodbine (yellow card) 64'	Stadium: Crew Stadium

July 9, 2010	Charleston Battery	1-0	Richmond Kickers	Daniel Island, South Carolina
7:30 PM	Woodbine (yellow card) 41' (yellow-red card) 82', (goal) 48'; Armstrong (yellow card) 43'; Wilson (red card) 90'		Foglesong (yellow card) 43'; Delicâte (red card) 90'	Stadium: Blackbaud Stadium; Attendance: 3,403; Referee: Abbas Piran

July 16, 2010	Charleston Battery	1-0	Real Maryland Monarchs	Daniel Island, South Carolina
7:30 PM	Neagle 17'		Bauer (yellow card) 3'; Raus (yellow card) 11'	Stadium: Blackbaud Stadium; Attendance: 2,787; Referee: Alan Schectman

July 24, 2010	Harrisburg City Islanders	2-3	Charleston Battery	Harrisburg, Pennsylvania
7:00 PM	Calvano (yellow card) 45'; Bixler (yellow card) 49'; Thayer 52'; Thayer 63'		Neagle 6'; Mayard 20'; Neagle (yellow card) 42'; Heinemann 80'	Stadium: Skyline Sports Complex; Attendance: 1,578; Referee: Zach Rubinich

July 25, 2010	Real Maryland Monarchs	0-0	Charleston Battery	Rockville, Maryland
6:30 PM	Patterson (yellow card) 81'		Bolton (yellow card) 73'; Woodbine (yellow card) 82'	Stadium: Lester Stadium; Attendance: 123; Referee: Kai Goodrich

July 31, 2010	Charlotte Eagles	2-2	Charleston Battery	Matthews, North Carolina
7:00 PM	Herrera 46'; Herrera 54'		Woodbine (yellow card) 70'; Neagle 73'; Neagle (yellow card) 74'; Lemons 90' (o.g.)	Stadium: Restart Field; Attendance: 1262; Referee: Danny Thornberry

August 7, 2010	Pittsburgh Riverhounds	2-1	Charleston Battery	Bridgeville, Pennsylvania
7:00 PM	Harada (yellow card) 12'; Gray 17'; Deighton 36'		Fuller (penalty missed); Fuller (yellow card) 17'; Hinemann 56'; Wilson (yellow card) 71'	Stadium: Chartiers Valley High Stadium; Attendance: 1,656; Referee: John Safar

August 14, 2010	Charleston Battery	3-0	Charlotte Eagles	Daniel Island, South Carolina
7:30 PM	Neagle 37'; Fuller (yellow card) 38'; Hinemann 44'; Mayard 48'			Stadium: Blackbaud Stadium; Attendance: 4,735; Referee: Skye Arthur Banning

August 28, 2010, USL-2 Championship match	Charleston Battery	2-1	Richmond Kickers	Daniel Island, South Carolina
6:00 PM	Neagle 26'; Falvey (red card) 30'; Fuller 52'; Woodbine (yellow card) 79'; Neagle (yellow card) 83'		Elcock 73'; Burke (yellow card) 83'; Yomby (yellow card) 83'	Stadium: Blackbaud Stadium; Attendance: 4,523; Referee: Jose Carlos Rivero

== Players ==
=== Roster ===
as of April 27, 2010

Note: Flags indicate national team as defined under FIFA eligibility rules; some limited exceptions apply. Players may hold more than one non-FIFA nationality.

No.	Pos.	Nation	Player
0	GK	HON	Ryan Cooper
1	GK	USA	Tim Melia (on loan from Real Salt Lake)
3	DF	IRL	Colin Falvey
4	MF	USA	Lamar Neagle
5	DF	CAN	Nigel Marples
6	MF	USA	Josh Bolton
7	DF	JAM	O'Brian Woodbine
8	MF	ENG	Mark Briggs
9	FW	USA	Tommy Heinemann
10	FW	BRA	Amaury Nunes
12	DF	CUB	Yeniel Bermudez
13	MF	USA	Kevin Jackson
14	MF	CAN	Pierre-Rudolph Mayard (on loan from Montreal Impact)

No.	Pos.	Nation	Player
15	MF	SEN	Alioune Gueye
16	MF	RSA	Stephen Armstrong
17	MF	USA	Jon Gruenewald
18	FW	USA	Patrick Tate
19	FW	USA	Levi Coleman
20	DF	USA	Mike Zaher
21	DF	USA	Brandon Massie
24	MF	USA	Zach Prince
25	MF	USA	John Wilson
30	GK	USA	Keith Wiggans

=== Staff ===
- (United States) Michael Anhaeuser Head Coach/General Manager
- (United States) Ian Fuller Assistant Coach
