= 2011 Charleston Battery season =

Charleston Battery
2011 season
- Owner: (England) Tony Bakker
- Manager: (United States) Michael Anhaeuser
- Stadium: Blackbaud Stadium
- USL Pro: 4th
- Playoffs: Division Semifinals
- U.S. Open Cup: 2nd Rd
- Top goalscorer: (Scotland) Nicki Paterson (3 goals)
- Highest home attendance: 4,083 vs. Charlotte (Apr 9)
- Lowest home attendance: 3,328 vs. Richmond (May 24)
- Average home league attendance: 3,568
Home colors	Away colors

The 2011 Charleston Battery season was the eighteenth season of the Charleston Battery. It was their second consecutive year in the third tier of American soccer, playing in the USL Professional Division for their inaugural season.

The Battery also participated in the second round of the 2011 U.S. Open Cup.

== Club ==
=== Roster ===
As of May 27, 2011.

Note: Flags indicate national team as defined under FIFA eligibility rules; some limited exceptions apply. Players may hold more than one non-FIFA nationality.

No.	Pos.	Nation	Player
0	GK	USA	Sean O'Connor (on loan from Carolina)
1	GK	USA	Andrew Dykstra
2	DF	USA	Mark Wiltse
3	DF	USA	Graham Dugoni
5	DF	CAN	Nigel Marples
6	MF	NZL	Cole Peverley
7	MF	JAM	Evan Taylor
8	MF	SCO	Nicki Paterson
9	FW	JAM	Dane Kelly
10	FW	BRA	Diego Walsh
13	MF	USA	Kevin Jackson
14	MF	USA	Alex Caskey

No.	Pos.	Nation	Player
15	FW	GAM	Seedy Bah
16	MF	RSA	Stephen Armstrong
17	MF	USA	Jon Gruenewald
19	FW	USA	Levi Coleman
20	MF	USA	J. C. Mack
21	DF	USA	Brandon Massie
22	DF	USA	Sean Flatley
23	DF	USA	Mike Zaher
24	MF	USA	Zach Prince
25	MF	USA	John Wilson
30	GK	USA	Keith Wiggans
32	DF	IRL	Colin Falvey

=== Management and staff ===
- (United States) Andrew Bell - President
- (United States) Michael Anhaeuser - Head Coach and General Manager
- (South Africa) Stephen Armstrong - Assistant Coach

== Table ==
=== American Division ===
Pos	Team	Pld	W	T	L	GF	GA	GD	Pts	Qualification
1	Orlando City SC (C)	24	15	6	3	36	16	+20	51	2011 USL Pro Commissioner's Cup, 2011 USL Pro Playoffs
2	Wilmington Hammerheads (A)	24	14	3	7	42	30	+12	45	2011 USL Pro Playoffs (Note: The top four clubs in each division are guaranteed spots in the 2011 USL Pro Playoffs.)
3	Richmond Kickers (A)	24	12	5	7	35	21	+14	41	2011 USL Pro Playoffs
4	Charleston Battery (A)	24	10	5	9	24	25	−1	35	2011 USL Pro Playoffs
5	Charlotte Eagles	24	9	6	9	32	29	+3	33	
6	Antigua Barracuda	24	9	2	13	32	32	0	29	

Source: USL Pro official standings
Rules for classification: Points, then tiebreak: 1) Head-to-head record based on total points in League games, 2) Total wins in League games, 3) Goal difference in League games, 4) Goals scored in League games, etc.
(A) Advances to USL Pro Playoffs; (C) Commissioner's Cup (best regular season record)

== Match reports ==
=== Carolina Challenge Cup ===
March 5, 2011 1	Charleston Battery	1–2	D.C. United	Charleston, SC
19:15 EDT	Armstrong 15' (pen.)	Report	4' Pontius; 71' Wolff	Stadium: Blackbaud Stadium

March 9, 2011 2	Charleston Battery	2–1	Toronto FC	Charleston, SC
19:15 EDT	Kelly 43'; Zaher 55'	Report	Sturgis 14' (pen.)	Stadium: Blackbaud Stadium

March 12, 2011 3	Charleston Battery	0–0	Chicago Fire	Charleston, SC
19:15 EDT	Videira (yellow card) 35' (yellow-red card) 38'		Armstrong (red card) 30'; Wiltse (red card) 35'	Stadium: Blackbaud Stadium

=== USL Pro ===
The Battery began their season with a 1–0 win over Charlotte on an own goal by Eagles defender Mark Bloom. They then traveled to Dayton, winning 2–1 with goals by Nicki Paterson and Colin Falvey. Next came a 2–1 loss to Richmond with Levi Coleman opening the scoring.

== Statistics ==
Goals: (Scotland) Nicki Paterson-3 goals; (Jamaica) Dane Kelly-1 goal; (Republic of Ireland) Colin Falvey-1 goal; (South Africa) Stephen Armstrong-1 goal; (United States) Levi Coleman-1 goal; (United States) Jon Gruenewald-1 goal; (The Gambia) Seedy Bah-1 goal.
