= List of Charleston Battery seasons =

The Charleston Battery are an American professional soccer club based in Charleston, South Carolina that compete in the USL Championship, the second division in the United States. Founded in 1993, the club has competed at both the second and third tiers of American soccer. The following is a list of each season completed by the Battery, inclusive of all competitive competitions.

== Key ==
Key to competitions

- USL Championship (USLC) – The second division of soccer in the United States, established in 2010 and previously known as USL and USL Pro. The Championship was the third division of American soccer from its founding until its elevation to second division status in 2017.
- USL First Division (USL-1) – The second division of soccer in the United States from 2005 through 2009.
- USL Second Division (USL-2) – The third division of soccer in the United States from 2005 through 2009.
- A-League – The second division of soccer in the United States from 1995 through 2004, now defunct.
- USL Select League (USISL) – The third division of soccer in the United States from 1989 through 1997, now defunct.
- U.S. Open Cup (USOC) – The premier knockout cup competition in US soccer, first contested in 1914.
- CONCACAF Champions League (CCL) – The premier competition in North American soccer since 1962. It went by the name of Champions' Cup until 2008.

Key to colors and symbols

1st or W	Winners
2nd or RU	Runners-up
Last	Wooden Spoon
♦	Golden Boot
	Highest average attendance

Key to league record

- Season = The year and article of the season
- Div = Level on pyramid
- League = League name
- Pld = Played
- W = Games won
- L = Games lost
- D = Games drawn
- GF = Goals scored
- GA = Goals against
- Pts = Points
- PPG = Points per game
- Conf = Conference position
- Overall = League position

Key to cup record

- DNE = Did not enter
- DNQ = Did not qualify
- NH = Competition not held or canceled
- QR = Qualifying round
- PR = Preliminary round
- GS = Group stage
- R1 = First round
- R2 = Second round
- R3 = Third round
- R4 = Fourth round
- R5 = Fifth round
- QF = Quarterfinals
- SF = Semifinals
- RU = Runners-up
- W = Winners

== Seasons ==
Season	League											Position		Playoffs	USOC	Continental / Other	Average attendance	Top goalscorer(s)	
Season	Div	League	Pld	W	L	D	GF	GA	GD	Pts	PPG	Conf.	Overall	Playoffs	USOC	Continental / Other	Average attendance	Name	Goals
1993	2	USISL	16	8	8	0	27	33	−6	24	1.50	5th	23rd	R1	DNE	Ineligible	–	(Guatemala) Mario Lone	9
1994	2	USISL	18	14	4	0	36	15	+21	42	2.33	2nd	14th	SF	DNE	Ineligible	–	(Jamaica) Paul Young	23
1995	3	USISL Pro	20	17	3	0	58	16	+42	51	2.55	1st	6th	R1	DNQ	Ineligible	–	(Jamaica) Paul Young	25
1996	3	USISL Pro	16	12	4	0	46	23	+23	36	2.25	2nd	3rd	W	DNQ	Ineligible	1,467	(Nigeria) Patrick Olalere	20
1997	2	A-League	28	12	16	0	39	50	−11	48	1.71	4th	17th	QF	DNQ	Ineligible	1,737	(Nigeria) Patrick Olalere	11
1998	2	A-League	28	12	16	0	37	40	−3	36	1.29	8th	16th	R1	DNQ	Ineligible	1,896	(United States) Michael Burke	16
1999	2	A-League	28	15	13	0	43	39	+4	45	1.61	6th	13th	R1	SF	Ineligible	3,542	(United States) Paul Conway	14
2000	2	A-League	28	18	8	2	59	36	+23	56	2.00	1st	3rd	QF	R2	Ineligible	3,485	(United States) Paul Conway	18
2001	2	A-League	26	16	9	1	51	34	+17	49	1.88	2nd	5th	R1	Ro16	Ineligible	3,083	(United States) Paul Conway	23
2002	2	A-League	28	19	3	6	46	16	+30	63	2.25	1st	2nd	QF	Ro16	Ineligible	3,320	(United States) Paul Conway	14
2003	2	A-League	28	15	6	7	41	27	+14	52	1.86	2nd	6th	W	DNQ	Ineligible	3,969	(United States) Josh Henderson	13
2004	2	A-League	28	7	15	6	30	39	−9	27	0.96	8th	13th	DNQ	SF	Ineligible	3,715	(Jamaica) Greg Simmonds	6
2005	2	USL-1	28	9	14	5	27	36	−9	32	1.14	N/A	9th	DNQ	R2	Ineligible	3,649	(Jamaica) Greg Simmonds	4
2006	2	USL-1	28	13	8	7	33	25	+8	46	1.64	N/A	3rd	SF	Ro16	Ineligible	3,628	(Turks and Caicos Islands) Gavin Glinton	11
2007	2	USL-1	28	8	14	6	32	39	−7	30	1.07	N/A	10th	DNQ	QF	Ineligible	3,968	(England) Stephen Armstrong	7
2008	2	USL-1	30	11	12	7	34	36	−2	40	1.33	N/A	5th	R1	RU	Ineligible	3,991	(Trinidad and Tobago) Randi Patterson	8
2009	2	USL-1	30	14	5	11	33	21	+12	53	1.77	N/A	4th	QF	QF	DNQ	3,534	(Trinidad and Tobago) Randi Patterson	6
2010	3	USL-2	20	11	4	5	35	25	+10	38	1.90	N/A	1st	W	QF	DNQ	3,641	(United States) Lamar Neagle	14
2011	3	USL Pro	24	10	9	5	24	25	−1	35	1.46	4th	6th	QF	R2	DNQ	3,568	(Scotland) Nicki Paterson	7
2012	3	USL Pro	24	12	10	2	36	26	+10	38	1.58	N/A	3rd	W	R3	DNQ	3,947	(Scotland) Nicki Paterson	12
2013	3	USL Pro	26	13	7	6	48	29	+19	45	1.73	N/A	3rd	SF	Ro16	DNQ	3,554	(Jamaica) Dane Kelly	13
2014	3	USL Pro	28	11	9	8	36	31	+5	41	1.46	N/A	5th	QF	R3	DNQ	3,770	(Jamaica) Dane Kelly	13
2015	3	USL	28	12	6	10	43	28	+15	46	1.64	3rd	7th	QF	R4	DNQ	4,080	(Jamaica) Dane Kelly	14
2016	3	USL	30	13	8	9	38	33	+5	48	1.60	6th	10th	QF	R3	DNQ	3,570	(Jamaica) Romario Williams	10
2017	2	USL	32	15	8	9	53	33	+20	54	1.69	2nd	7th	R1	R4	DNQ	3,167	(Jamaica) Romario Williams	15
2018	2	USL	34	14	6	14	47	34	+13	56	1.65	4th	9th	R1	R4	DNQ	2,872	(Trinidad and Tobago) Ataulla Guerra	16
2019	2	USLC	34	11	10	13	44	44	0	46	1.35	9th	19th	R1	R4	DNQ	2,424	(Jamaica) Zeiko Lewis	8
2020	2	USLC	15	9	3	3	26	15	+11	30	2.00	5th	9th	QF	NH	DNQ	N/A	(Jamaica) Nicque Daley (Bermuda) Zeiko Lewis	6
2021	2	USLC	32	10	15	7	49	60	-11	37	1.16	10th	22nd	DNQ	NH	DNQ	2,631	(Italy) Claudio Repetto	9
2022	2	USLC	34	6	21	7	41	77	-36	25	0.74	12th	25th	DNQ	R2	DNQ	2,797	(Sierra Leone) Augustine Williams	16
2023	2	USLC	34	17	9	8	47	43	+4	59	1.74	3rd	4th	RU	R4	DNQ	3,113	(Sierra Leone) Augustine Williams	15
2024	2	USLC	34	18	6	10	68	35	+33	64	1.88	2nd	2nd	CF	Ro16	DNQ	3,645	(United States) Nick Markanich	28
2025	2	USLC	30	19	6	5	62	32	+30	62	2.07	2nd	2nd	QF	Ro32	DNQ	3,908	(United States) Cal Jennings	17
Total	–	–	895	421	295	179	1369	1098	+271	1432	1.58	–	–	–	–	–	–	(United States) Paul Conway	91

1. Avg. attendance only includes statistics from regular season matches.
2. Top goalscorer(s) includes all goals scored in the regular season play, playoffs, U.S. Open Cup, and other competitive matches.
3. Points and PPG have been adjusted from non-traditional to traditional scoring systems for seasons prior to 2003 to more effectively compare historical team performance across seasons.
