= 2013 Charleston Battery season =

Charleston Battery
2013 season
- Owner: (England) Tony Bakker
- Manager: (United States) Michael Anhaeuser
- Stadium: Blackbaud Stadium
- USL Pro: 3rd
- USL Pro Playoffs: Semifinals
- U.S. Open Cup: Rd 4
- Carolina Challenge Cup: 3rd
Home colors	Away colors

The 2013 Charleston Battery season was the club's 21st season of existence. It was the Battery's fourth consecutive year in the third tier of American soccer, playing in the USL Professional Division for their third season. Charleston entered the season as the defending USL Pro champions.

== Competitions ==
=== Exhibition ===
==== Carolina Challenge Cup ====
February 16, 2013 1	Vancouver Whitecaps FC	3–2	Charleston Battery	Charleston, South Carolina
19:15 EST	Jordan Harvey (yellow card) 19'; Kekuta Manneh 4', 28'; Daigo Kobayashi 50'; Alain Rochat (yellow card) 66'	Report	Cody Ellison (yellow card) 49'; Quinton Griffith (yellow card) 66'; Nicki Paterson 71'; Dane Kelly 80'	Stadium: Blackbaud Stadium

February 20, 2013 2	Charleston Battery	1–2	Chicago Fire	Charleston, South Carolina
19:15 EST	Jose Cuevas 11'; Gibson Bardsley (yellow card) 54'	Report	Austin Berry 27'; Arne Friedrich (yellow card) 44'; Hunter Jumper (yellow card) 90'; Alex 90'	Stadium: Blackbaud Stadium

February 23, 2013 3	Charleston Battery	2–1	Houston Dynamo	Charleston, South Carolina
19:15 EST	Dane Kelly 18'; Jose Cuevas (yellow card) 35'; Austin Savage 74'	Report	Giles Barnes 16'; Brian Ownby (yellow card) 82'	Stadium: Blackbaud Stadium

==== Preseason ====
February 28, 2013 Preseason	College of Charleston Cougars	0–3	Charleston Battery	Mount Pleasant, South Carolina
14:30 EST			Griffith; Kelly,	Stadium: CofC Soccer Stadium at Patriots Point

March 2, 2013 Preseason	Clemson Tigers	0–5	Charleston Battery	Clemson, South Carolina
15:00 EST			Savage; Prince; Bardsley vanSchaik; Cuevas	Stadium: Riggs Field

March 5, 2013 Preseason	Charleston Battery	4–1	Georgia Southern Eagles	Charleston, South Carolina
20:00 EST	Cordovés; Cuevas; Mueller; Bardsley		Goal	Stadium: Blackbaud Stadium

March 7, 2013 Preseason	Charleston Battery	2–0	Coastal Carolina Chanticleers	Charleston, South Carolina
18:00 EST	Cuevas,			Stadium: Blackbaud Stadium

March 15, 2013 Preseason	Carolina RailHawks	1–2	Charleston Battery	Cary, North Carolina
	Goal		Griffith; Azira	Stadium: WakeMed Soccer Park

March 19, 2013 Preseason	Charleston Battery	0–0	College of Charleston Cougars	Charleston, South Carolina
14:30 EST				Stadium: Blackbaud Stadium

March 23, 2013 Preseason	Charleston Battery	2–0	Wilmington Hammerheads	Charleston, South Carolina
18:00 EST	Fisk; Cuevas			Stadium: Blackbaud Stadium

March 26, 2013 Preseason	Coastal Carolina Chanticleers	0–2	Charleston Battery	Conway, South Carolina
			Cuevas; Taylor Mueller	Stadium: Coastal Carolina University Soccer Field

March 30, 2013 Preseason	Charleston Battery	1–0	Carolina RailHawks	Charleston, South Carolina
14:00 EST	Cuevas	Report		Stadium: Blackbaud Stadium

=== U.S. Open Cup ===
May 21, 2013 Second round	Portland Timbers U23s (Oregon)	0–1	(South Carolina) Charleston Battery	Portland, Oregon
22:30 EDT	Lurie (yellow card) 55'	Report	Prince (yellow card) 11' vanSchaik (yellow card) 20'; Savage 60'; Paterson (yellow card) 90'	Stadium: JELD-WEN Field
