= 2013 Carolina Challenge Cup =

Tournament details
- Host country: United States
- Dates: February 16–23
- Teams: 4 (from 1 confederation)
- Venue: 1 (in 1 host city)

Final positions
- Champions: Chicago Fire (1st title)

Tournament statistics
- Matches played: 6
- Goals scored: 21 (3.5 per match)

The 2013 Carolina Challenge Cup was the 10th staging of the tournament. The tournament began on February 16 and concluded on February 23.

D.C. United were the three-time defending champions of the preseason tournament, but did not participate in this year's edition of the cup.

Chicago Fire has won the 2013 Carolina Challenge Cup. It was the club's first title.

== Teams ==
Four clubs competed in the tournament:

| Team | League | Appearance |
|---|---|---|
| (United States) Charleston Battery (hosts) | USL Pro | 10th |
| (United States) Chicago Fire | MLS | 3rd |
| (United States) Houston Dynamo | MLS | 3rd |
| (Canada) Vancouver Whitecaps FC | MLS | 1st |

== Standings ==
| Team | Pld | W | D | L | GF | GA | GD | Pts |
|---|---|---|---|---|---|---|---|---|
| Chicago Fire | 3 | 2 | 1 | 0 | 6 | 4 | +2 | 7 |
| Vancouver Whitecaps FC | 3 | 1 | 1 | 1 | 5 | 5 | 0 | 4 |
| Charleston Battery | 3 | 1 | 0 | 2 | 5 | 6 | −1 | 3 |
| Houston Dynamo | 3 | 1 | 0 | 2 | 5 | 6 | −1 | 3 |

== Matches ==
| February 16 Match 1 | Houston Dynamo | 2 – 3 | Chicago Fire | Charleston, South Carolina |
| 17:00 EST | Taylor (yellow card) 10'; Davis 15'; Chabala (yellow card) 46'; Weaver 64'; Watson (yellow card) 89' | Report | MacDonald 23'; 27' (o.g.); Larentowicz 48'; Thompson (yellow card) 89' | Stadium: Blackbaud Stadium |

| February 16 Match 2 | Vancouver Whitecaps FC | 3 – 2 | Charleston Battery | Charleston, South Carolina |
| 19:15 EST | Harvey (yellow card) 19'; Manneh 4', 28'; Kobayashi 50'; Rochat (yellow card) 66' | Report | Ellison (yellow card) 49'; Griffith (yellow card) 66'; Paterson 71'; Kelly 80' | Stadium: Blackbaud Stadium |

| February 20 Match 3 | Houston Dynamo | 2 – 1 | Vancouver Whitecaps FC | Charleston, South Carolina |
| 17:00 EST | Arena (yellow card) 55'; Bruin 75'; Moffat 77'; Nealis 78' | Report | Hertzog 27'; Heinemann (yellow card) 89'; Mitchell (yellow card) 89' | Stadium: Blackbaud Stadium |

| February 20 Match 4 | Charleston Battery | 1 – 2 | Chicago Fire | Charleston, South Carolina |
| 19:15 EST | Cuevas 11'; Bardsley (yellow card) 54' | Report | Berry 27'; Friedrich (yellow card) 44'; Jumper (yellow card) 90'; Alex 90' | Stadium: Blackbaud Stadium |

| February 23 Match 5 | Chicago Fire | 1 – 1 | Vancouver Whitecaps FC | Charleston, South Carolina |
| 16:30 EST | Larentowicz (yellow card) 55'; Santos 57'; Thompson (yellow card) 83' | Report | Koffie (yellow card) 43'; Mattocks 67' (pen.) | Stadium: Blackbaud Stadium |

| February 23 Match 6 | Charleston Battery | 2 – 1 | Houston Dynamo | Charleston, South Carolina |
| 19:15 EST | Kelly 18'; Cuevas (yellow card) 35'; Savage 74' | Report | Barnes 16'; Ownby (yellow card) 82' | Stadium: Blackbaud Stadium |

== See also ==
- Carolina Challenge Cup
- Charleston Battery
- 2013 in American soccer
