= 2012 USL Pro season =

26th season of third-division soccer league in the United States

USL Pro
- Season: 2012
- Champions: Charleston Battery (1st Title)
- Commissioner's Cup: Orlando City SC (2nd Title)
- Matches: 132
- Goals: 330 (2.5 per match)
- Best player: (Trinidad and Tobago) Kevin Molino Orlando City SC
- Top goalscorer: (United States) Dennis Chin Orlando City SC (11 Goals)
- Best goalkeeper: (Germany) Kristian Nicht Rochester Rhinos
- Biggest home win: CHB 4, ANT 0 (May 4); HAR 4, DDL 0 (May 19); DDL 4, WIL 0 (June 23); ORL 4, ROC 0 (July 14); ORL 4, CHB 0 (July 27); CHE 4, ANT 0 (August 4)
- Biggest away win: ORL 4, LAB 0 (July 8); CHB 4, ROC 0 (August 11)
- Highest scoring: WIL 4, LAB 2 (June 30); ORL 4, HAR 2 (August 1)
- Longest winning run: 6 games: ROC (April 14 – May 12)
- Longest unbeaten run: 14 games: ORL (June 9 – August 17)
- Longest winless run: 12 games: DDL (April 13 – June 17)
- Longest losing run: 8 games: ANT (April 28 – June 29)
- Highest attendance: 8,932; ORL vs DDL (August 17)
- Lowest attendance: 200; LAB vs WIL (May 4)
- Average attendance: 2,777

The 2012 USL Pro season was the 26th season of third-division soccer in the United States, and the second season of USL Pro. The season started with 11 teams. FC New York self-relegated to the National Premier Soccer League prior to the release of the schedule. The final weekend of the regular season was August 17–19.

== Teams ==
=== Stadiums and Locations ===
Team	Location	Stadium	Capacity
Antigua Barracuda	St. John's, Antigua	Stanford Cricket Ground	5,000
Charleston Battery	Charleston, South Carolina	Blackbaud Stadium	5,100
Charlotte Eagles	Charlotte, North Carolina	Restart Field	2,000
Dayton Dutch Lions	Bellbrook, Ohio	Miami Valley South Stadium	3,000
Harrisburg City Islanders	Harrisburg, Pennsylvania	Skyline Sports Complex	5,000
Los Angeles Blues	Fullerton, California	Titan Stadium	10,000
Orlando City SC	Orlando, Florida	Citrus Bowl	65,438
Pittsburgh Riverhounds	Bridgeville, Pennsylvania	Chartiers Valley High School	2,500
Richmond Kickers	Richmond, Virginia	City Stadium	22,000
Rochester Rhinos	Rochester, New York	Sahlen's Stadium	13,768
Wilmington Hammerheads	Wilmington, North Carolina	Legion Stadium	6,000

=== Personal and Kits ===
Note: Flags indicate national team as has been defined under FIFA eligibility rules. Players and Managers may hold more than one non-FIFA nationality.

Team	Head coach	Captain	Jersey manufacturer	Shirt sponsor
Antigua Barracuda	(England) Tom Curtis	(Antigua and Barbuda) George Dublin	Joma	None
Charleston Battery	(United States) Michael Anhaeuser	(South Africa) Stephen Armstrong	Umbro	avVenta
Charlotte Eagles	(United States) Mark Steffens	(United States) Josh Rife	Admiral	Coca-Cola
Dayton Dutch Lions	(Netherlands) Ivar van Dinteren	(United States) Bret Jones	Under Armour	Scoutforall.com
Harrisburg City Islanders	(United States) Bill Becher	(United States) Jason Pelletier	Nike	Capital Blue Cross/Snickers
Los Angeles Blues	(United States) Charlie Naimo	(Iran) Shahryar Dastan	Nike	Marriott
Orlando City SC	(England) Adrian Heath	(United States) Ian Fuller	Umbro	Orlando Health/Legoland Florida
Pittsburgh Riverhounds	(United States) Justin Evans		Umbro	#1 Cochran
Richmond Kickers	(England) Leigh Cowlishaw	(United States) Ronnie Pascale	Adidas	Health Diagnostic Laboratory Inc.
Rochester Rhinos	(United States) Jesse Myers		Umbro	Non-Smoking Coalition
Wilmington Hammerheads	(England) David Irving		Umbro	New Hanover Regional Medical Center

== Transfers ==
For full list, see List of USL Pro transfers 2012.

== Standings ==
Locations of teams for the 2012 USL Pro season

Pos	Team	Pld	W	T	L	GF	GA	GD	Pts	Qualification
1	Orlando City SC (C)	24	17	6	1	50	18	+32	57	Commissioner's Cup, Playoffs 1st round bye
2	Rochester Rhinos (A)	24	12	5	7	27	23	+4	41	Playoffs 1st round bye
3	Charleston Battery (A)	24	12	2	10	36	26	+10	38	Playoffs
4	Richmond Kickers (A)	24	11	5	8	31	27	+4	38	Playoffs
5	Wilmington Hammerheads (A)	24	10	7	7	34	32	+2	37	Playoffs
6	Harrisburg City Islanders (A)	24	10	7	7	34	29	+5	37	Playoffs
7	Charlotte Eagles	24	11	3	10	34	26	+8	36	
8	Los Angeles Blues	24	9	3	12	26	29	−3	30	
9	Dayton Dutch Lions	24	4	10	10	20	29	−9	22	
10	Pittsburgh Riverhounds	24	4	5	15	20	39	−19	17	
11	Antigua Barracuda	24	5	1	18	16	50	−34	16	

Source: USL Pro official standings
Rules for classification: Points, then tiebreak: 1) Head-to-head record based on total points in League games, 2) Total wins in League games, 3) Goal difference in League games, 4) Goals scored in League games, etc.
(A) Advances to USL Pro Playoffs; (C) Commissioner's Cup (best regular season record)

== Results table ==
Color Key: Home • Away • Win • Loss • Draw
Club	Match																							
Club	1	2	3	4	5	6	7	8	9	10	11	12	13	14	15	16	17	18	19	20	21	22	23	24
Antigua Barracuda FC (ANT)	PIT	PIT	CHE	CHE	WIL	CHB	ORL	ORL	CHB	ORL	CHB	CHB	ROC	HAR	LAB	LAB	PIT	DAY	RIC	CHE	LAB	LAB	RIC	RIC
Antigua Barracuda FC (ANT)	0–1	3–1	3–2	0–2	0–3	0–4	0–1	1–2	0–3	0–2	0–2	1–0	1–4	1–1	0–3	0–2	1–4	1–3	0–2	0–4	2–1	0–1	0–1	2–1
Charleston Battery (CHB)	RIC	RIC	CHE	PIT	ANT	ROC	LAB	PIT	DAY	ORL	ANT	HAR	ANT	ANT	CHE	CHE	WIL	ORL	ORL	WIL	WIL	HAR	ROC	DAY
Charleston Battery (CHB)	2–1	1–2	3–0	1–0	4–0	0–1	1–0	3–1	1–0	1–2	3–0	3–1	2–1	0–1	0–2	0–1	3–1	1–2	0–4	2–2	1–2	0–3	4–0	0–0
Charlotte Eagles (CHE)	ORL	DAY	CHB	HAR	ANT	ANT	HAR	ROC	ROC	WIL	ORL	RIC	RIC	LAB	CHB	CHB	PIT	WIL	RIC	RIC	ANT	PIT	DAY	WIL
Charlotte Eagles (CHE)	0–2	0–0	0–3	1–2	2–3	2–0	2–1	0–1	0–1	1–1	1–2	0–1	4–1	3–1	2–0	1–0	2–0	1–2	1–0	1–2	0–4	3–0	2–2	1–0
Dayton Dutch Lions (DDL)	CHE	PIT	ROC	RIC	LAB	ROC	HAR	ROC	CHB	PIT	LAB	LAB	WIL	ORL	PIT	ROC	HAR	HAR	WIL	RIC	ANT	CHE	ORL	CHB
Dayton Dutch Lions (DDL)	0–0	0–2	0–1	1–1	0–1	1–1	0–4	2–2	0–1	1–1	0–1	0–1	4–0	2–2	1–0	0–2	0–0	2–1	0–2	0–2	3–1	2–2	1–1	0–0
Harrisburg City Islanders (HAR)	CHE	WIL	CHE	RIC	PIT	DAY	ROC	RIC	WIL	ROC	ORL	CHB	ROC	PIT	ANT	DAY	DAY	PIT	LAB	ORL	CHB	RIC	LAB	LAB
Harrisburg City Islanders (HAR)	2–1	0–0	1–2	0–0	0–0	4–0	1–0	1–1	0–2	2–1	0–3	1–3	2–1	3–2	1–1	0–0	1–2	2–0	2–0	2–4	3–0	1–2	2–2	1–0
Los Angeles Blues (LAB)	ROC	ROC	WIL	WIL	DAY	PIT	ORL	CHB	DAY	DAY	CHE	WIL	RIC	ORL	ORL	ANT	ANT	ROC	HAR	PIT	ANT	ANT	HAR	HAR
Los Angeles Blues (LAB)	0–1	0–2	2–1	2–2	1–0	3–0	0–0	0–1	1–0	1–0	1–3	2–4	0–1	0–1	0–4	3–0	2–0	0–1	0–2	2–0	1–2	1–0	2–2	0–1
Orlando City SC (ORL)	CHE	WIL	RIC	RIC	PIT	ANT	ANT	LAB	CHE	WIL	CHB	ANT	HAR	DAY	PIT	LAB	LAB	ROC	CHB	WIL	CHB	HAR	ROC	DAY
Orlando City SC (ORL)	2–0	4–1	2–0	0–0	3–2	1–0	2–1	0–0	2–1	1–3	2–1	2–0	3–0	2–2	1–1	1–0	4–0	4–0	2–1	1–1	4–0	4–2	1–0	1–1
Pittsburgh Riverhounds (PIT)	ANT	ANT	DAY	CHB	WIL	ORL	LAB	HAR	RIC	CHB	DAY	ROC	WIL	ORL	DAY	HAR	RIC	CHE	HAR	ROC	ANT	LAB	CHE	ROC
Pittsburgh Riverhounds (PIT)	1–0	1–3	2–0	0–1	0–1	2–3	0–3	0–0	1–1	1–3	1–1	1–1	2–1	1–1	0–1	2–3	1–3	0–2	2–0	0–2	4–1	2–0	0–3	0–1
Richmond Kickers (RIC)	CHB	CHB	ORL	ORL	DAY	HAR	PIT	WIL	HAR	ROC	CHE	WIL	CHE	ROC	LAB	WIL	PIT	DAY	CHE	CHE	ANT	HAR	ANT	ANT
Richmond Kickers (RIC)	1–2	2–1	0–2	0–0	1–1	2–2	1–1	3–1	1–1	1–0	1–0	1–2	1–4	2–3	1–0	0–1	3–1	0–2	0–1	2–1	0–2	2–1	1–0	1–2
Rochester Rhinos (ROC)	LAB	LAB	DAY	CHE	CHE	CHB	DAY	HAR	DAY	RIC	WIL	HAR	PIT	RIC	HAR	ANT	DAY	WIL	ORL	PIT	LAB	ORL	CHB	PIT
Rochester Rhinos (ROC)	1–0	2–0	1–0	1–0	1–0	1–0	1–1	0–1	2–2	0–1	1–1	1–2	1–1	3–2	1–2	4–1	2–0	0–0	0–4	2–0	1–0	1–0	0–4	1–0
Wilmington Hammerheads (WIL)	ORL	HAR	PIT	ANT	LAB	LAB	CHE	RIC	ORL	ROC	HAR	RIC	PIT	DAY	LAB	RIC	ROC	CHB	DAY	CHE	ORL	CHB	CHB	CHE
Wilmington Hammerheads (WIL)	1–4	0–0	1–0	3–0	1–2	2–2	1–1	1–3	3–1	1–1	2–0	2–1	1–2	0–4	4–2	1–0	0–0	1–3	2–0	2–1	1–1	2–2	1–2	0–1

USL Pro published schedule and results.

== Playoffs ==
The 2012 USL Pro Playoffs included the top six finishers in the table, with the No. 1 and No. 2 seeds receiving a first-round bye on August 25. The semifinals featuring the four remaining teams was played the following weekend, with the 2012 USL PRO Championship set for the weekend of September 7–9. All playoff rounds featured a single-game knockout format.

First Round
4	Richmond Kickers	2
5	Wilmington Hammerheads	3
3	Charleston Battery	2
6	Harrisburg City Islanders	1

Semi-finals
1	Orlando City SC	3
5	Wilmington Hammerheads	4
2	Rochester Rhinos	1 (3)
3	Charleston Battery (p)	1 (4)

USL Pro Championship
3	Charleston Battery	1
5	Wilmington Hammerheads	0

August 25, 2012 1st	Richmond Kickers	2–3	Wilmington Hammerheads	Richmond, Virginia
7:00 pm EDT	Yeisley 12'; Elcock 79'	Report; Report	Briggs (yellow card) 57'; Chirishian 69'; Perry 72'; Guzman (yellow card) 90'; Parratt 90+3'	Stadium: City Stadium; Attendance: 1,441; Referee: Charles Carson

August 25, 2012 1st	Charleston Battery	2–1	Harrisburg City Islanders	Charleston, South Carolina
7:30 pm EDT	Paterson 40' (pen.) (yellow card) 89'; Donatelli 45+1'; Richter (yellow card) 80'	Report; Report	Ombiji 16'; Mellor (yellow card) 45'; Pelletier (yellow card) 53'; Basso (yellow card) 77'	Stadium: Blackbaud Stadium; Attendance: 2,718; Referee: Augie Minasola

August 31, 2012 SF	Orlando City SC	3–4	Wilmington Hammerheads	Orlando, Florida
7:30 pm EDT	Luzunaris 44'; O'Connor (yellow card) 61'; Watson (yellow card) 81' (goal) 90+' (pen.); Davis 90+'	Report; Report	Hertzog 4' (pen.), 59' (yellow card) 90+'; Holmes 9'; Chirishian (yellow card) 29' (goal) 30'; Cole (yellow card) 32'; Riley (red card) 64'; Guzman (yellow card) 71'; Hernandez (yellow card) 90+'	Stadium: Citrus Bowl; Attendance: 7,887; Referee: Marcos Deliveira

August 31, 2012 SF	Rochester Rhinos	1–1 (a.e.t.) (3–4 p)	Charleston Battery	Rochester, New York
7:35 pm EDT	McFayden 55'; McManus (yellow card) 57'; Hoxie (yellow card) 76'; Cost (yellow card) 80'; Fernández (yellow card) 90'	Report; Report	Donatelli 90+'; Hoffer (yellow card) 114'	Stadium: Sahlen's Stadium; Attendance: 3,312; Referee: Vito Testa, Jr.
	Penalties
	Hoxie (penalty missed); Kyriazis (penalty scored); Earls (penalty scored); Zamudio (penalty scored); Roberts (penalty missed); Nicht (penalty missed); Rosenlund (penalty missed)		(penalty scored) Paterson; (penalty missed) Donatelli; (penalty scored) Azira; (penalty missed) Falvey; (penalty scored) Prince; (penalty missed) Wilson; (penalty scored) Mack

September 8, 2012 F	Charleston Battery	1–0	Wilmington Hammerheads	Charleston, South Carolina
7:30 pm EDT	Azira 74'; Falvey (yellow card) 75'; Wiltse (yellow card) 87'	Report; Report; Report	Cole (yellow card) 34'; Chirishian (yellow card) 46'; Musa (yellow card) 66'	Stadium: Blackbaud Stadium; Attendance: 4,963; Referee: Robert Sibiga

Championship Game MVP: (United States) Jose Cuevas (CHB)

=== Average home attendances ===
Ranked from highest to lowest average attendance.

Team	GP	Total	High	Low	Average
Orlando City SC	12	79,276	8,932	3,506	6,606
Rochester Rhinos	12	75,176	7,959	4,653	6,265
Wilmington Hammerheads	12	51,183	5,382	2,482	4,265
Charleston Battery	12	47,359	4,782	2,983	3,947
Richmond Kickers	12	28,550	5,009	1,424	2,379
Harrisburg City Islanders	12	17,418	1,958	355	1,452
Pittsburgh Riverhounds SC	12	11,810	2,023	532	984
Antigua Barracuda	10	8,831	1,800	381	883
Charlotte Eagles	12	9,348	1,447	522	779
Dayton Dutch Lions	12	8,592	1,053	367	716
Los Angeles Blues	12	8,247	2,432	134	687
Total	130	345,790	8,932	134	2,660

== Statistical leaders ==
=== Top scorers ===
Rank	Player	Nation	Club	Goals
1	Dennis Chin	JAM	Orlando City SC	11
2	Nicki Paterson	SCO	Charleston Battery	10
3	Corey Hertzog	USA	Wilmington Hammerheads	9
3	Matt Luzunaris	USA	Orlando City SC	9
5	Andriy Budnyy	UKR	Wilmington Hammerheads	8
6	Jose Cuevas	USA	Charleston Battery	7
6	Lucky Mkosana	ZIM	Harrisburg City Islanders	7
8	Bright Dike	NGA	Los Angeles Blues	6
8	Andrew Hoxie	USA	Rochester Rhinos	6
8	Yann Ekra	FRA	Harrisburg City Islanders	6
8	Chris Agorsor	USA	Richmond Kickers	6
8	Matt Kassel	USA	Pittsburgh Riverhounds	6
8	Darryl Roberts	TRI	Charlotte Eagles	6

=== Top assists ===
Rank	Player	Nation	Club	Assists
1	J. C. Banks	USA	Rochester Rhinos	8
2	Kevin Molino	TRI	Orlando City SC	7
3	Corey Hertzog	USA	Wilmington Hammerheads	5
4	Ryan Richter	USA	Charleston Battery	4
4	Jason Pelletier	USA	Harrisburg City Islanders	4
4	Jose Cuevas	USA	Charleston Battery	4
4	Mauricio Salles	BRA	Charlotte Eagles	4
4	Luke Boden	ENG	Orlando City SC	4
4	Tony Donatelli	USA	Charleston Battery	4
4	Sainey Touray	GAM	Harrisburg City Islanders	4
4	Sallieu Bundu	SLE	Charleston Battery	4

=== Top goalkeepers ===
(Minimum of 1080 Minutes Played)

Rank	Goalkeeper	Club	GP	MINS	SVS	GA	GAA	W-L-T	SHO
1	(Mexico) Miguel Gallardo	Orlando City SC	21	1845	53	16	0.780	14-0-6	8
2	(Germany) Kristian Nicht	Rochester Rhinos	22	1890	86	20	0.909	12-6-4	11
3	(United States) Andrew Dykstra	Charleston Battery	20	1800	57	20	1.000	11-7-2	9
4	(United States) Eric Reed	Charlotte Eagles	21	1890	64	21	1.000	9-9-1	7
5	(United States) Ronnie Pascale	Richmond Kickers	24	2154	95	27	1.128	11-8-5	7
6	(United States) Matt Williams	Dayton Dutch Lions	24	2147	115	29	1.215	4-10-10	5
7	(United States) Nick Noble	Harrisburg City Islanders	23	2050	70	29	1.273	9-7-7	8
8	(United States) Alex Horwath	Wilmington Hammerheads	24	2160	85	32	1.333	11-7-6	7
9	(United States) Hunter Gilstrap	Pittsburgh Riverhounds	22	1980	92	35	1.590	4-13-5	3
10	(Antigua and Barbuda) Molvin James	Antigua Barracuda	15	1268	56	33	2.342	3-9-1	0

== League awards ==
- Most Valuable Player: (Trinidad and Tobago) Kevin Molino (ORL)
- Rookie of the Year: (United States) Jose Cuevas (CHB)
- Defender of the Year: (United States) Troy Roberts (ROC)
- Goalkeeper of the Year: (Germany) Kristian Nicht (ROC)
- Coach of the Year: (England) Adrian Heath (ORL)

== All-League Teams ==
=== First Team ===
F: (Jamaica) Dennis Chin (ORL), (United States) Jose Cuevas (CHB), (United States) Corey Hertzog (WIL)
M: (United States) J.C. Banks (ROC), (Trinidad and Tobago) Kevin Molino (ORL), (Scotland) Nicki Paterson (CHB)
D: (United States) Josh Rife (CHE), (United States) Troy Roberts (ROC), (United States) Rob Valentino (ORL), (Cameroon) William Yomby (RIC)
G: (Germany) Kristian Nicht (ROC)

=== Second Team ===
F: (Nigeria) Bright Dike (LAB), (United States) Matt Luzunaris (ORL), (Zimbabwe) Lucky Mkosana (HAR)
M: (United States) Joel DeLass (DDL), (United States) Matt Kassel (PIT), (United States) Bryce Taylor (WIL)
D: (Jamaica) Kieron Bernard (ORL), (Cuba) Erlys Garcia (LAB), (Antigua and Barbuda) Quentin Griffith (ANT), (Haiti) Mechack Jérôme (ORL)
G: (Mexico) Miguel Gallardo (ORL)
