= List of USL Pro transfers 2012 =

The following is a list of transfers for the 2012 USL Pro season. The transactions begin at the conclusion of the 2011 USL Pro season and end after the championship match of the 2012 season.

== Transfers ==
Date	Name	Last Club	Moving to	Mode of Transfer
November 28, 2011	(United States) Jack Traynor	Orlando City	Rochester Rhinos	Free
November 28, 2011	(United States) Michael Zaher	Charleston Battery	Rochester Rhinos	Free
December 6, 2011	(United States) Jason Yeisley	Pittsburgh Riverhounds	Richmond Kickers	Free
December 8, 2011	(Scotland) Allan Russell	Carolina RailHawks	Los Angeles Blues	Free
December 14, 2011	(United States) Bryan Burke	Kitsap Pumas	Los Angeles Blues	Free
December 19, 2011	(United States) Conor Chinn	Atlanta Silverbacks	Rochester Rhinos	Free
December 21, 2011	(United States) Brandon Miller	UNC Wilmington	Rochester Rhinos	Free
January 6, 2012	(United States) Kyle Hoffer	FC New York	Charleston Battery	Free
January 6, 2012	(United States) Jose Cuevas	Fresno Fuego	Charleston Battery	Free
January 10, 2012	(Republic of Ireland) James O'Connor	(England) Sheffield Wednesday	Orlando City	Free
January 14, 2012	(United States) Matthew Fondy	Pittsburgh Riverhounds	Los Angeles Blues	Free
January 18, 2012	(Wales) Anthony Pulis	(England) Aldershot Town	Orlando City	Free
January 19, 2012	(United States) Luis Gonzalez	Thunder Bay Chill	Los Angeles Blues	Free
January 26, 2012	(United States) George Davis IV	Dayton Dutch Lions	Los Angeles Blues	Free
January 26, 2012	(England) John Rooney	New York Red Bulls	Orlando City	Free
January 26, 2012	(Cuba) Yordany Alvarez	Orlando City	Real Salt Lake	Undisclosed
January 31, 2012	(United States) Neal Kitson	Rochester Rhinos	(England) Northampton Town F.C.	Free
February 2, 2012	(Cape Verde) Graciano Brito	Unattached	Rochester Rhinos	Free
February 6, 2012	(Scotland) Tam McManus	(Scotland) Ayr United	Rochester Rhinos	Free
February 14, 2012	(United States) Jeff DeGroot	unattached	Dayton Dutch Lions	Free
February 14, 2012	(United States) Kyle Knotek	unattached	Dayton Dutch Lions	Free
February 14, 2012	(United States) Greg Preciado	unattached	Dayton Dutch Lions	Free
February 15, 2012	(New Zealand) Shay Spitz	Hollywood United Hitmen	Los Angeles Blues	Free
February 15, 2012	(United States) Alex Horwath	New York Red Bulls	Wilmington Hammerheads	Free
February 15, 2012	(United States) Tyler Lassiter	New York Red Bulls	Wilmington Hammerheads	Free
February 23, 2012	(United States) Hagop Chirishian	unattached	Wilmington Hammerheads	Free
February 23, 2012	(United States) Bryce Taylor	Mississippi Brilla	Wilmington Hammerheads	Free
February 25, 2012	(United States) Daniel Holowaty	unattached	Dayton Dutch Lions	Free
February 25, 2012	(Jamaica) Toric Robinson	unattached	Dayton Dutch Lions	Free
February 29, 2012	(England) Mark Briggs	(England) Rushall	Wilmington Hammerheads	Free
March 2, 2012	(The Gambia) Ebrima Jatta	(The Gambia) Banjul Hawks FC	Los Angeles Blues	Free
March 6, 2012	(United States) Eli Garner	unattached	Dayton Dutch Lions	Free
March 6, 2012	(Germany) Kristian Nicht	(Germany) Karlsruher SC	Rochester Rhinos	Free
March 6, 2012	(United States) Matt Williams	Wilmington Hammerheads	Dayton Dutch Lions	Free
March 7, 2012	(South Korea) Cho Sunhyung	(South Korea) Seosan Omega FC	Los Angeles Blues	Free
March 7, 2012	(South Korea) Park Cheunyong	(China) Beijing Ligong	Los Angeles Blues	Free
March 9, 2012	(United States) Shane Johnson	unattached	Richmond Kickers	Free
March 10, 2012	(United States) Rich Costanzo	Rochester Rhinos	Pittsburgh Riverhounds	Free
March 13, 2012	(United States) Alex Caskey	Charleston Battery	Seattle Sounders FC	undisclosed
March 14, 2012	(United States) Steven Perry	(Finland) Ekenäs IF	Wilmington Hammerheads	undisclosed
March 15, 2012	(United States) Brian Farber	Carolina Railhawks	Los Angeles Blues	Free
March 16, 2012	(Scotland) Ricky Waddell	(Scotland) Clyde FC	Los Angeles Blues	Free
March 20, 2012	(Sierra Leone) Sallieu Bundu	Carolina Railhawks	Charleston Battery	Free
March 21, 2012	(Canada) Ladislas Bushiri	(Indonesia) Persitara Jakarta Utara	Los Angeles Blues	Free
March 23, 2012	(Wales) Chad Bond	(Wales) Llanelli A.F.C.	Los Angeles Blues	Free
March 23, 2012	(United States) Irving Garcia	(Guatemala) Antigua GFC	Los Angeles Blues	Free
March 23, 2012	(United States) Alec Kann	unattached	Charleston Battery	Free
March 23, 2012	(United States) Kevin Klasila	unattached	Charleston Battery	Free
March 27, 2012	(United States) Christian Davidson	unattached	Wilmington Hammerheads	Free
March 27, 2012	(United States) Bilal Duckett	Vancouver Whitecaps FC	Harrisburg City Islanders	Free
March 27, 2012	(United States) Daniel Roberts	unattached	Wilmington Hammerheads	Free
March 27, 2012	(Chile) Gustavo Zamudio	(Chile) Universidad Católica	Rochester Rhinos	Free
March 28, 2012	(United States) Tony Donatelli	Rochester Rhinos	Charleston Battery	Free
March 28, 2012	(United States) Cody Ellison	unattached	Charleston Battery	Free
March 28, 2012	(United States) Ryan Richter	Philadelphia Union	Charleston Battery	Free
March 30, 2012	(United States) Clint Irwin	unattached	Charlotte Eagles	Free
