= Yeniel Bermúdez =

Cuban footballer (born 1985)

Personal information
- Full name: Yeniel Bermúdez Ferrer
- Date of birth: October 8, 1985 (age 41)
- Place of birth: Cienfuegos, Cuba
- Height: 5 ft 11 in (1.80 m)
- Positions: Center back; defender

Senior career*
Years	Team	Apps	(Gls)
2003–2008	Cienfuegos		
2009–2010	Charleston Battery	30	(0)
2009	→ W Hammerheads (loan)	2	(0)
2011	River Plate Puerto Rico	2	(0)
2011	Los Angeles Blues	6	(0)

International career^{‡}
2006–2008	Cuba	8	(0)
- * Club domestic league appearances and goals as of September 2, 2010 ‡ National team caps and goals as of March 30, 2011

Yeniel Bermúdez Ferrer (born October 8, 1985 in Cienfuegos) is a Cuban footballer who last played for Los Angeles Blues in the USL Professional Division.

== Club career ==
=== Cuba ===
Bermúdez began his career in his native Cuba, playing with FC Cienfuegos in the Campeonato Nacional de Fútbol de Cuba.

While playing for the Cuban U-23 national team in the Olympic qualifying tournament in Tampa, Florida in March 2008, Bermudez along with several other members of the team, defected to the United States under the wet foot dry foot scheme that allows Cubans who reach U.S. soil to obtain asylum. After his defection, Bermudez declared his brother was dismissed from Cuba's under-20 team as a result.

=== United States ===
Following an unsuccessful trial with Los Angeles Galaxy, Bermudez was signed to a professional contract by Charleston Battery after impressing coach Michael Anhaeuser during pre-season. He made his professional debut on May 8, 2009, in game against Carolina RailHawks.

Bermudez was not listed on the 2011 roster for Charleston released on April 7, 2011. In 2010, he spent time in Alaska with his girlfriend who worked there at a school.

== International career ==
He made his international debut for Cuba in a September 2006 CONCACAF Gold Cup qualification match against Turks & Caicos and has earned a total of 8 caps, scoring no goals. His final international was a February 2008 friendly match against Guyana, a month prior to defecting to the United States.

== Honors ==
=== Charleston Battery ===
- USL Second Division Champions (1): 2010
- USL Second Division Regular Season Champions (1): 2010
