= Amaury Nunes =

Brazilian footballer (born 1983)

Personal information
- Full name: Amaury Nunes
- Date of birth: 26 January 1983 (age 43)
- Place of birth: Rio de Janeiro, Brazil
- Height: 6 ft 0 in (1.83 m)
- Positions: Midfielder; forward

Youth career
- 2000–2002: Flamengo

College career
Years	Team	Apps	(Gls)
2004	Oklahoma Baptist Bison		
2005–2007	Fresno Pacific Sunbirds	57	(51)

Senior career*
Years	Team	Apps	(Gls)
2002–2004	Bangu Atlético Clube	26	(22)
2005–2008	Fresno Fuego	44	(32)
2009	Charlotte Eagles	15	(10)
2009	→ Rochester Rhinos (loan)	7	(2)
2010	Charleston Battery	17	(7)
2010	Hessen Kassel	1	(0)
2011	Churchill Brothers	18	(5)
2011–2012	Citizen	21	(11)
2012	San Antonio Scorpions	1	(0)
2012	TOT		
2013–2014	Ocala Stampede	1	(0)
- * Club domestic league appearances and goals

Amaury Nunes (born January 26, 1983) is a Brazilian former professional footballer who most recently worked for the Fort Lauderdale Strikers of the NASL as a general manager.

== Career ==
=== College and amateur ===
Having been a part of the youth setup at famed Brazilian club Flamengo as a teenager, Nunes relocated from his native Brazil to the United States in 2004 to attend college. He played four years of college soccer, initially at Oklahoma Baptist University, where as a freshman, Nunes scored 21 goals in 24 games. At Fresno Pacific University, as a sophomore Nunes scored 17 goals in 16 games, being selected as NAIA All-American Team. In 2007, in his senior year, Nunes scored 22 goals in 22 games, and was named again 1st team NAIA All-American. Nunes scored a total of 70 goals in 4 years of College in USA.

During his college years Nunes also played for Fresno Fuego in the USL Premier Development League, helping the team to the PDL Southwest Division and Western Conference titles in 2007, while scoring 32 goals in 44 games during his four years with the team.

=== Professional ===
Prior to starting his career in the United States, Nunes played professionally in Brazil for 2 years, in Rio de Janeiro for 3rd Division club Bangu A.C.

Nunes was drafted by the Chicago Storm of the Major Indoor Soccer League in the 2008 Major Indoor Soccer League College Draft, but did not take up the opportunity to play for the team, focusing on University, instead.

After finishing his studies, Nunes signed with the Charlotte Eagles of the USL Second Division, and made his debut against Pittsburgh Riverhounds, scoring two goals in a 5–1 Eagles victory.

With the Eagles, Nunes was named player of the week six times and scored 10 goals in 15 games. Nunes was also named USL All-League team.

After the USL season, Nunes spent a few months with MLS 2009 Champions Real Salt Lake. On March 3, 2010 Charleston Battery announced the signing of Nunes to a contract for the 2010 season. For two consecutive seasons, Nunes has been on the Championship match of USL. In 2009 for the Charlotte Eagles, where they finished second place, and in 2010 for the Charleston Battery, where they were Champions. Nunes has also helped Rochester Rhinos during the 2009 USL play off run.

After a few successful years in the United States, Nunes had a chance to go overseas. Following the conclusion of the 2010 USL season Nunes signed a short-term contract with German Regionalliga Süd team Hessen Kassel. After a few months in Germany, Nunes had a good opportunity to go play in Asia.

In December 2010, Nunes signed a contract with Churchill Brothers, in the Indian Premier division I-League. In March 2011, Nunes helped the team to win the IFA Shield, one of the oldest tournaments in the Country.

On 19 July 2011, Nunes signed for Citizen to play in the 2011–12 Hong Kong First Division League.

On April 4, 2012, the San Antonio Scorpions FC Announced they have signed Nunes to play the 2012 season. On July 14, Nunes signed for TOT Sport Club from the Thai Premier League.

== Honors ==
=== Charleston Battery ===
- USL Second Division: 2010
- USL Second Division regular season: 2010
