= Dane Kelly =

Jamaican footballer (born 1991)

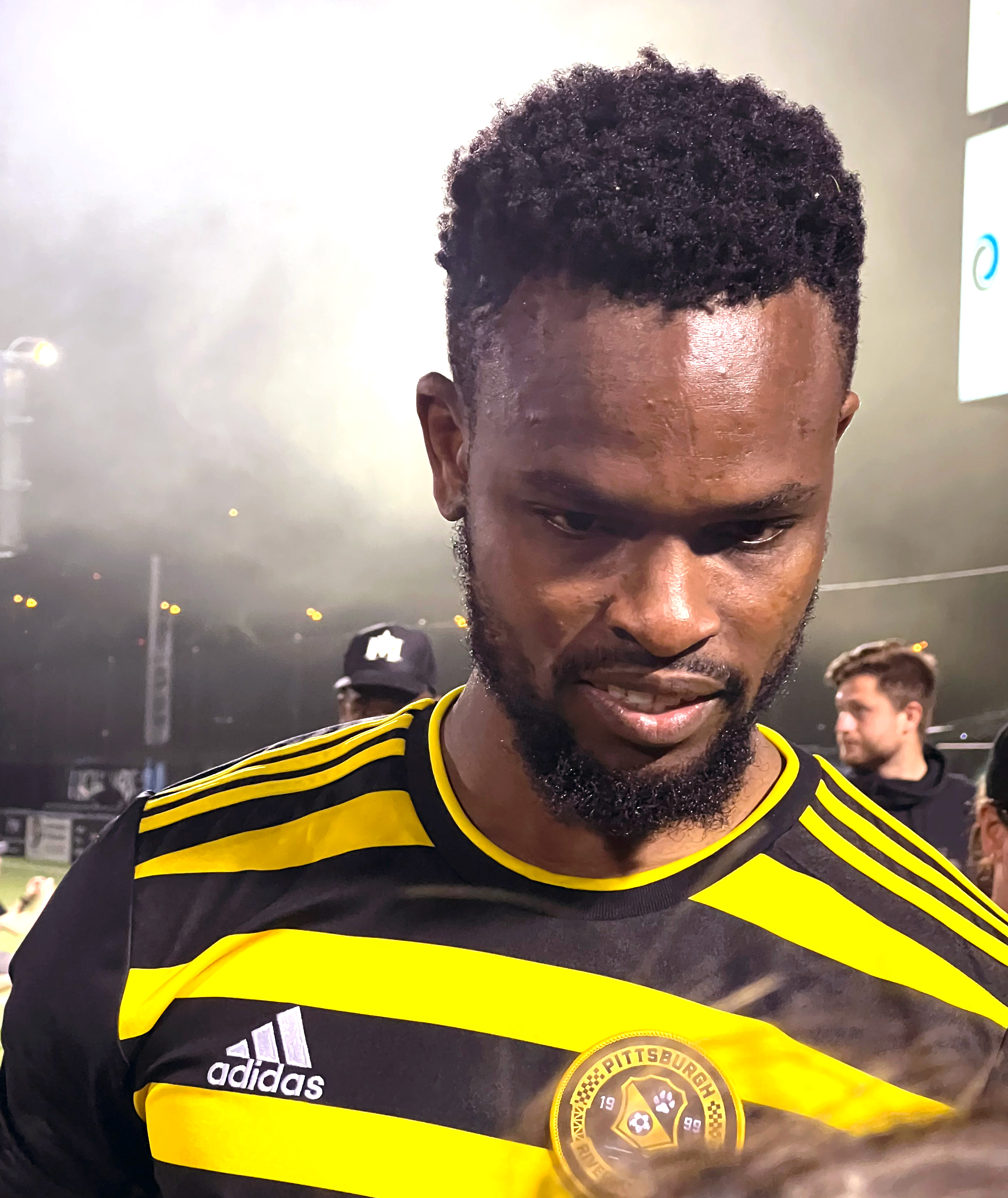
- Kelly with the Riverhounds, April 2022

Personal information
- Full name: Dane Kelly
- Date of birth: 9 February 1991 (age 35)
- Place of birth: Saint Catherine Parish, Jamaica
- Height: 1.80 m (5 ft 11 in)
- Position: Forward

Team information
- Current team: Spanish Town Police

Senior career*
Years	Team	Apps	(Gls)
2010–2014	Tivoli Gardens	37+	(10)
2011–2013	→ Charleston Battery (loan)	62	(21)
2014–2015	Charleston Battery	45	(21)
2016	Swope Park Rangers	20	(6)
2017	Reno 1868	27	(18)
2018	D.C. United	1	(0)
2018	→ Richmond Kickers (loan)	4	(1)
2019	Indy Eleven	32	(10)
2020	Charlotte Independence	16	(11)
2021	Bnei Sakhnin	15	(0)
2021	Charlotte Independence	23	(11)
2022	Pittsburgh Riverhounds	23	(7)
2023	Charlotte Independence	31	(8)
2026–	Spanish Town Police	0	(0)

International career^{‡}
2017–	Jamaica	3	(1)
- * Club domestic league appearances and goals as of 14 October 2023 ‡ National team caps and goals as of 14 October 2018

Dane Kelly (born 9 February 1991) is a Jamaican professional footballer who plays as a striker for Spanish Town Police FC. With 106 regular season goals, Kelly is the all-time leading scorer in the USL Championship.

== Professional career ==
=== Tivoli Gardens ===
Kelly began his career in his native Jamaica with top-flight Jamaica National Premier League side Tivoli Gardens. He led the U21 JPL league in scoring in 2010–2011 with 15 goals.

=== Charleston Battery ===
Kelly moved to the United States in 2011 after to attend open tryouts with the Charleston Battery after being spotted by the club during a scouting trip to Jamaica. After impressing coach Mike Anhaeuser during a 2011 Carolina Challenge Cup game against Toronto FC, Kelly signed with the Battery on 16 March and made his debut with the team on 9 April 2011 in a game against the Charlotte Eagles.

In 2014, Kelly was named the club's player of the year and earned first team all-USL honors. In 2015, he scored 11 goals in 26 league appearances and had a man of the match performance with a goal and an assist in a 3–2 victory over NASL side Fort Lauderdale Strikers in the third round of the Lamar Hunt U.S. Open Cup. With his final goal of the season, the 42nd of his Charleston career, Kelly became the all-time leading scorer in the current United Soccer League, passing Matthew Delicate.

=== Swope Park Rangers ===
Kelly signed with Sporting Kansas City's USL affiliate side Swope Park Rangers on 16 December 2015. He scored his first goal for the club on 2 April against Tulsa Roughnecks FC. Kelly suffered a hamstring injury that ruled him out for nine games before returning against Vancouver Whitecaps FC 2 on 12 June.

=== Reno 1868 ===
Kelly signed with Reno 1868 of the USL in 2017. He earned the 2017 USL MVP and Golden Boot award, leading the league with 18 goals scored.

=== D.C. United ===
On 9 March 2018, Kelly signed with MLS club D.C. United. He scored his first unofficial goal for D.C. on 19 September 2018, in a friendly against C.D. Olimpia.

=== Indy Eleven ===
On 16 January 2019, Kelly signed with USL Championship side Indy Eleven.

=== Charlotte Independence ===
On 27 January 2020, Kelly moved again, joining USL Championship side Charlotte Independence. He scored a hat trick against Charlotte's in-state rival North Carolina FC on 5 September 2020.

=== Bnei Sakhnin ===
In early 2021, Kelly signed with Israeli Premier League side Bnei Sakhnin. His only goal for the club came in an Israel State Cup game against Hapoel Hadera.

=== Return to Charlotte Independence ===
On 19 May 2021, Kelly re-signed with Charlotte Independence following his spell in Israel.

=== Pittsburgh Riverhounds SC ===
Following the 2021 season, Charlotte Independence voluntarily self-relegated to USL League One. Kelly stayed in the USL Championship by signing with Pittsburgh Riverhounds SC on January 7, 2022. On March 15, 2022, Kelly was named USL Championship Player of the Week for Week 1, having scored his 100th regular season goal in the league against Memphis 901 on March 12, 2022.

=== Third spell at Charlotte Independence ===
On 2 March 2023, Kelly returned to Charlotte Independence for the third time, joining ahead of the 2023 USL League One season.

== International career ==
In 2017, Kelly was called up to the Jamaica senior national team. He scored his first goal against South Korea an exhibition match that ended 2–2

== Career statistics ==
=== Club ===
As of 4 May 2019

Club	Season	League			Cup (Note: All appearances in the U.S. Open Cup)		Continental		Other (Note: All appearances in the USL Cup Playoffs)		Total	
Club	Season	Division	Apps	Goals	Apps	Goals	Apps	Goals	Apps	Goals	Apps	Goals
Tivoli Gardens	2009–10	National Premier League		1			–		–			1+
Tivoli Gardens	2010–11	National Premier League	0	0	0	0	–		–		0	0
Tivoli Gardens	2011–12	National Premier League	19	2			–		–		19+	2+
Tivoli Gardens	2012–13	National Premier League	16	6			–		–		16+	6+
Tivoli Gardens	2013–14	National Premier League	2	1			–		–		2+	1+
Tivoli Gardens	Total		37+	10			0	0	0	0	37+	10+
Charleston Battery (loan)	2011	USL Pro	22	5	2	1	–		1	0	25	6
Charleston Battery (loan)	2012	USL Pro	17	5	1	1	–		0	0	18	6
Charleston Battery (loan)	2013	USL Pro	23	11	2	1	–		2	1	27	13
Charleston Battery	2014	USL Pro	19	10	1	2	–		1	1	21	13
Charleston Battery	2015	USL	26	11	2	2	–		2	1	30	14
Charleston Battery	Total		107	42	8	7	0	0	6	3	121	52
Swope Park Rangers	2016	USL	20	6	–		–		4	2	24	8
Reno 1868	2017	USL	27	18	0	0	–		1	0	28	18
D.C. United	2018	MLS	1	0	1	0	–		0	0	2	0
Richmond Kickers (loan)	2018	USL	4	1	0	0	–		–		4	1
Indy Eleven	2019	USL Championship	8	4	0	0	–		0	0	8	4
Career total			204+	81+	9+	7+	0	0	11	5	224+	93+

=== International goals ===
Scores and results list Jamaica's goal tally first.

#	Date	Venue	Opponent	Score	Result	Competition
1.	30 January 2018	Mardan Sports Complex, Antalya, Turkey	South Korea	1–0	2–2	Friendly
2.	14 October 2018	Ergilio Hato Stadium, Willemstad, Curaçao	Bonaire	6–0	6–0	2019–20 CONCACAF Nations League qualification

== Honors ==
- USL
  - Champions (1): 2012
  - MVP (1): 2017
  - Golden Boot (1): 2017
