= Josh Bolton =

American soccer player (born 1984)

Personal information
- Full name: Joshua W. Bolton
- Date of birth: May 26, 1984 (age 42)
- Place of birth: Penfield, New York, U.S.
- Height: 6 ft 2 in (1.88 m)
- Position: Midfielder

College career
Years	Team	Apps	(Gls)
2002–2005	Williams Ephs		

Senior career*
Years	Team	Apps	(Gls)
2002	Albany Admirals	16	(3)
2005–2007	Rochester Raging Rhinos	18	(0)
2005	→ Wilmington Hammerheads (loan)	1	(0)
2007	→ Harrisburg City Islanders (loan)	2	(0)
2008	Atlanta Silverbacks	28	(0)
2010	Charleston Battery	20	(0)
Total		85	(3)
- * Club domestic league appearances and goals as of September 2, 2010

Josh Bolton (born May 26, 1984) is an American former professional soccer player.

Bolton began his club career with the Albany Admirals in 2002 during his freshman year playing for the Williams Ephs. In 2005, Bolton began his professional career with the Rochester Raging Rhinos, during which he spent time on loan at the Wilmington Hammerheads and Harrisburg City Islanders. Bolton then spent a single season with the Atlanta Silverbacks before becoming a free agent through 2009. Bolton returned to professional play in 2010 for a single year with the Charleston Battery.

== Career ==
=== Youth ===
Bolton grew up in Penfield, New York, and was a childhood fan of the Rochester Rhinos. He graduated in 2002 from Penfield High School. He attended Williams College, playing on the men's soccer team from 2002 to 2005. He was a 2004 and 2005 1st Team All American. and the 2004 and 2005 New England Small College Athletic Conference Player of the Year.

=== Professional ===
In 2005, Bolton spent the collegiate off season with the Albany Admirals in the Premier Development League. In 2006, he signed with the Rochester Rhinos of the USL First Division going on loan with the Wilmington Hammerheads of the USL Second Division for one game. In April 2007, the Rhinos loaned Bolton to the Harrisburg City Islanders of the USL-2 for two games. On February 13, 2008, Bolton signed with the Atlanta Silverbacks of USL-1.

After spending a year out of professional soccer in 2009, Charleston Battery announced the signing of Bolton to a contract for the 2010 season.

Bolton was not included on the 2011 roster released by Charleston on April 7, 2011.

== Honors ==
=== Charleston Battery ===
- USL Second Division Champions (1): 2010
- USL Second Division Regular Season Champions (1): 2010
