= Alioune Gueye =

Senegalese footballer

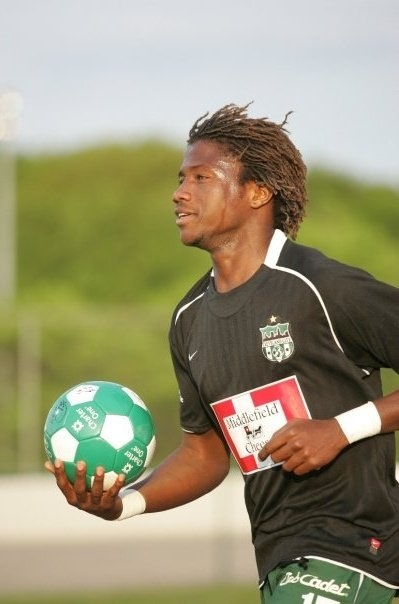

Personal information
- Full name: Alioune Gueye
- Date of birth: February 25, 1987 (age 39)
- Place of birth: Ziguinchor, Senegal
- Height: 5 ft 9 in (1.75 m)
- Position: Midfielder

Youth career
- Casa Sport

Senior career*
Years	Team	Apps	(Gls)
2004–2005	Casa Sport		
2006–2008	Dolphins		
2009	Cleveland City Stars	21	(1)
2010	Charleston Battery	20	(3)
2011/2015	C.R. Caála	120	(12)
- * Club domestic league appearances and goals

Alioune Gueye (born February 25, 1987) is a Senegalese footballer.

== Career ==
=== Africa ===
Gueye began his professional career in his native Senegal, playing for his hometown team Casa Sport in the Senegal Premier League, before moving to Nigeria in 2006 to playing with Dolphins in the Nigerian Premier League. He helped Dolphins win the Nigerian FA Cup in 2006 and 2007, and played in the CAF Confederation Cup in 2007 and 2008.

=== North America ===
Gueye joined the Cleveland City Stars of the USL First Division in May 2009, and made his debut for the team on May 16, 2009, against the Minnesota Thunder. Gueye appeared in 21 matches and scored one during the 2009 season. When the season came to a conclusion the Cleveland franchise folded after one season in the USL First Division, thereby resulting in the club releasing all its players from their contracts.

On March 3, 2010, Charleston announced the signing of Gueye to a contract for the 2010 season.

Gueye was not listed on the 2011 Charleston roster released April 7, 2011.

=== Angola ===
On 9 March 2011 signed with Clube Recreativo da Caála in Angola.

== Honors ==
=== Charleston Battery ===
- USL Second Division Champions (1): 2010
- USL Second Division Regular Season Champions (1): 2011. 1/8 caf cup with recreativo da caala scors 2 goals in 2013. 27 games 2014 plus 1cup game
