= John Wilson (soccer, born 1977) =

American soccer player born 1977

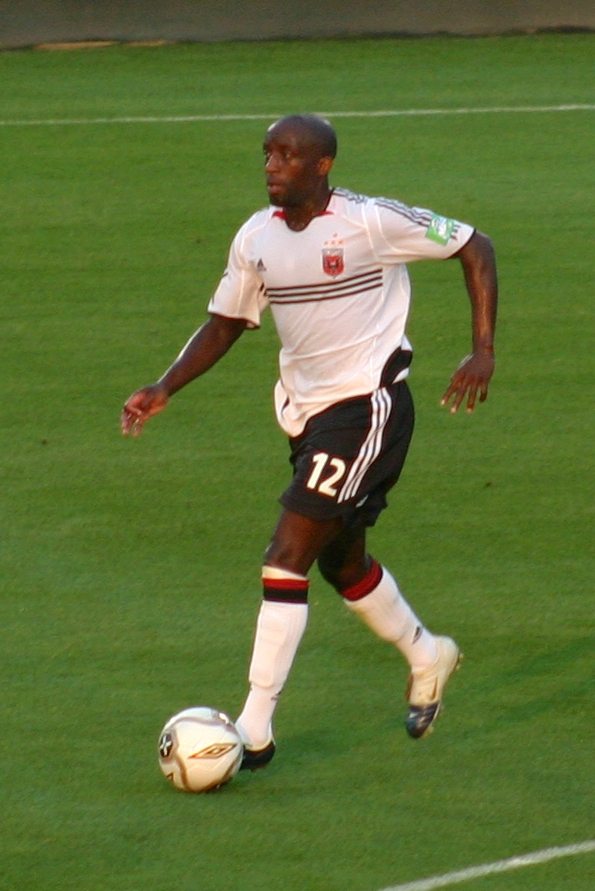

Personal information
- Full name: John Wilson
- Date of birth: October 26, 1977 (age 49)
- Place of birth: Seneca, South Carolina, United States
- Height: 5 ft 10 in (1.78 m)
- Positions: Left back; winger

College career
Years	Team	Apps	(Gls)
1995–1998	Clemson Tigers		

Senior career*
Years	Team	Apps	(Gls)
1999–2003	Charleston Battery	114	(1)
2000	→ Raleigh Capital Express (loan)	1	(0)
2000	→ Kansas City Wizards (loan)	3	(0)
2000	→ MLS Pro 40 (loan)	9	(0)
2002	→ New England Revolution (loan)	1	(0)
2004	Rochester Raging Rhinos	22	(0)
2005–2007	D.C. United	28	(0)
2008–2014	Charleston Battery	155	(2)
Total		333	(3)

Managerial career
- 2014–2021: Charleston Battery (assistant)
- * Club domestic league appearances and goals as of September 27, 2013

John Wilson (born October 26, 1977, in Seneca, South Carolina) is an American former professional soccer player who spent the majority of his career with the Charleston Battery, playing mostly as a left fullback. Wilson finished his career with 269 appearances for Charleston, second only to Dusty Hudock in club history.

== Career ==
=== College ===
Wilson was raised in Seneca, South Carolina, and played college soccer at nearby Clemson University as a forward. During his time with the Tigers, Wilson helped them to an ACC Championship and an appearance in the NCAA Final Eight (1998). He tallied 18 goals and 35 assists in his college career.

=== Professional ===
Wilson was drafted by the MLS side Kansas City Wizards in 1999 but chose instead to stay in South Carolina and play for the A-League side Charleston Battery, where he was converted into a left back and voted defender of the year by the fans in his debut season. During the 2000 season, Wilson played briefly on loan with the Kansas City Wizards (who went on to capture the MLS Cup that year), a local Raleigh squad, Raleigh Capital Express and the MLS Pro 40 team.

In 2001 and 2002, Wilson was again voted Charleston's best defensive player in 2002. Wilson also played very briefly on loan with MLS side New England Revolution during 2002, when he tallied his lone MLS goal. Wilson helped Charleston win the A-League Championship in 2003 and was an All-League First Team defender. In 2004, Wilson joined another A-League side, Rochester Raging Rhinos.

On May 27, 2005, Wilson signed with D.C. United in Major League Soccer, where he played mostly left back and some left midfield. Wilson played in the Copa Sudamericana for United, appearing in both games versus Chilean side Universidad Católica. Wilson also logged significant time with the DC United reserve team, and aided them in their efforts to win the inaugural MLS Reserve Division title.

After being sidelined by a series of injuries, Wilson was waived by DC on June 26, 2007, and returned to Charleston prior to the 2008 season. Wilson would play a further seven seasons with the Battery, frequently serving as the squad's captain.

Wilson first announced his retirement following the 2010 season but reconsidered and signed a new contract with Charleston on March 3, 2011. On September 13, 2012, John Wilson announced a second retirement from the Charleston Battery but rejoined the team for the 2013 season. He would retire for the last time following the 2014 season, with the Battery's final home match of the year serving as a testimonial in honor of Wilson's contributions to the club. Wilson remained involved with the club as an assistant to head coach Mike Anhaeuser until 2021.

Following the 2021 season, Wilson transitioned to the Battery's front office where he currently leads the club's community engagement initiatives.

== Honors ==
D.C. United

- Major League Soccer Supporter's Shield (1): 2006

Charleston Battery

- A-League Champions (1): 2003
- USL Second Division Champions (1): 2010
- USL Second Division Regular Season Champions (1): 2010
- USL Pro Champions: 2012

Individual

- First Team All A-League (1): 2003
