= Keith Wiggans =

American soccer player (born 1981)

Personal information
- Full name: Keith Wiggans
- Date of birth: September 6, 1981 (age 45)
- Place of birth: Athens, Georgia, United States
- Height: 5 ft 11 in (1.80 m)
- Position: Goalkeeper

College career
Years	Team	Apps	(Gls)
2000–2004	College of Charleston Cougars		

Senior career*
Years	Team	Apps	(Gls)
2005–2011	Charleston Battery	43	(0)

Managerial career
- 2005–2006: West Virginia Mountaineers (assistant)
- 2009–2019: College of Charleston Cougars (assistant)
- 2020–: College of Charleston Cougars
- * Club domestic league appearances and goals

Keith Wiggans (born September 6, 1981, in Athens, Georgia) is a former American soccer player.

== Career ==
=== College ===
Wiggans attended Athens Academy in Athens, Georgia, where he was part of the team which went to the 1999 Georgia state soccer championship final. He then played college soccer at the College of Charleston from 2000 to 2004.

=== Professional ===
Wiggans signed with the Charleston Battery of the USL First Division on May 28, 2005. He has served as a backup to Dusty Hudock for the majority of his professional career.

=== Coaching ===
In 2007, he was an assistant on the College of Charleston women's soccer team.

In December 2019, he was promoted to head College of Charleston men's soccer coach, after serving the previous eleven seasons as an assistant coach.

== Honors ==
=== Charleston Battery ===
- USL Second Division Champions (1): 2010
