= Kevin Jackson (soccer) =

American soccer player

Personal information
- Full name: Kevin Jackson
- Date of birth: July 5, 1978 (age 48)
- Place of birth: Pittsgrove Township, New Jersey, United States
- Height: 5 ft 11 in (1.80 m)
- Position: Midfielder

College career
Years	Team	Apps	(Gls)
1996–1999	Lehigh Mountain Hawks		

Senior career*
Years	Team	Apps	(Gls)
1999	Central Jersey Riptide		
2000–2001	Hershey Wildcats	15	(1)
2002	South Jersey Barons	10	(0)
2003–2005	Charleston Battery	43	(2)
2010–2011	Charleston Battery	36	(1)
- * Club domestic league appearances and goals as of July 20, 2013

Kevin Jackson (born July 5, 1978, in Pittsgrove Township, New Jersey) is an American soccer player.

== Career ==
=== College and amateur ===
Jackson graduated from Arthur P. Schalick High School, and played college soccer at Lehigh University from 1996 to 1999. He holds the single game, season and career assists records at the school.

During his college years Jackson also played for the Central Jersey Riptide of the USL Premier Development League.

=== Professional ===
Jackson was selected in the 6th round (68th overall) of the 2000 MLS SuperDraft by Chicago Fire, and was drafted by the Hershey Wildcats of the USL A-League in the Territorial Round of the 2000 USL Draft. After Chicago waived his contract rights, Jackson signed with the Wildcats and spent the 2000 and 2001 season with the team. In 2002, he played for the South Jersey Barons, and in 2003 he moved to the Charleston Battery, playing for the team through the 2005 season.

Jackson left the Battery at the end of 2005 to work as a youth soccer coach at Daniel Island Soccer Academy, but returned to play for the Battery in 2010; he played his first competitive game in over five years on April 17, 2010, in Charleston's 2010 season opener against the Charlotte Eagles.

== Honors ==
=== Charleston Battery ===
- USL Second Division Champions (1): 2010
- USL Second Division Regular Season Champions (1): 2010
