= Jeremy Deighton =

American soccer player

Personal information
- Full name: Jeremy Deighton
- Date of birth: May 27, 1988 (age 38)
- Place of birth: Broadview Heights, Ohio, United States
- Height: 6 ft 3 in (1.91 m)
- Position: Forward

Youth career
- 2003–2005: St. Ignatius Wildcats
- –2006: SouthSide Bombers

College career
Years	Team	Apps	(Gls)
2006–2009	Slippery Rock		

Senior career*
Years	Team	Apps	(Gls)
2009	Erie Admirals		
2010–2012	Pittsburgh Riverhounds	41	(11)
- * Club domestic league appearances and goals as of July 21, 2012

Jeremy Deighton (born May 27, 1988) is an American soccer player.

== Career ==
=== College and amateur ===
Deighton attended Saint Ignatius High School in Cleveland, Ohio, where he was a three-year letter winner and a two-year starter for the No.1-ranked high school team in the nation. He was named his team's Most Valuable Offensive Player as a senior in 2005, leading the team to the Ohio Division I, State and National championships.

Deighton was also a featured player on the SouthSide Bombers, a prominent indoor soccer club in the area. In the 2005–2006 season Deighton lead the team in goals pushing the squad to its first title over longtime rival "Friendly People Football Club" in the championship game. It is a widely believed notion that his time with the Bombers led to Deighton's collegiate success paired along with his training with local soccer guru Nicolas Dipietro.

He subsequently played four years of college soccer at Slippery Rock University of Pennsylvania, where he was named PSAC-West Player of the Year and earned first team All-PSAC and first team All-Region honors as a junior in 2008 and a senior in 2009.

During his college years Deighton also played with the Erie Admirals in the National Premier Soccer League, helping the team to the 2009 NPSL Championship game.

=== Professional ===
Deighton turned professional in 2010 when he signed for the Pittsburgh Riverhounds of the USL Second Division. He made his professional debut on April 17, 2010, in the team's 2010 season opener against the Real Maryland Monarchs, and scored his first professional goal on May 15, 2010, in a 2–1 loss to Charleston Battery.
