= Mike Zaher =

American soccer player

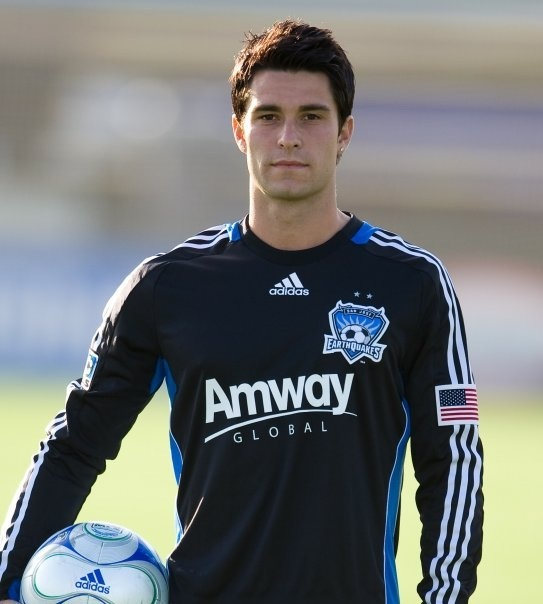
- Mike Zaher playing with the San Jose Earthquakes

Personal information
- Full name: Michael Rory Zaher
- Date of birth: September 24, 1985 (age 41)
- Place of birth: Phoenix, Arizona, United States
- Height: 5 ft 10 in (1.78 m)
- Position: Defender

Youth career
- 2004–2007: UCLA Bruins

Senior career*
Years	Team	Apps	(Gls)
2005	Boulder Rapids Reserve	6	(2)
2006–2007	San Fernando Valley Quakes	21	(1)
2008	D.C. United	3	(0)
2009	San Jose Earthquakes	10	(0)
2010–2011	Charleston Battery	38	(3)
2012	Rochester Rhinos	7	(0)
- * Club domestic league appearances and goals as of June 9, 2012

Michael Rory Zaher (born September 24, 1985, in Phoenix, Arizona) is an American former professional soccer player.

== Career ==
=== College and amateur ===
Zaher attended Bishop Gorman High School in Las Vegas, Nevada, whom he led to the Nevada high school state championship in 2002; he scored 34 goals as a senior, 25 as a junior, 13 as a sophomore and six as a freshman for a total of 78 career goals. He also led his club soccer team, Las Vegas Premier, to seven Nevada state championships.

Zaher played college soccer at UCLA, where he majored in political science. He played in 70 games over four seasons, scoring twice in the run-up to the 2006 NCAA soccer championship game in St. Louis, which UCLA lost 2–1 to UC Santa Barbara. Zaher is a former member of the U.S. U-18 National Team, was listed at #21 in Soccer America's Top 25 recruits list, is a two-time Parade All-American, was a member of the 2004 McDonald's All-American team and the 2003 NSCAA/adidas All-American team, was the Gatorade State Player of the Year in 2004, and was selected to the ESP All-Star Team in 2002 and 2003.

During his college years, Zaher also played in the USL Premier Development League, for Boulder Rapids Reserve and the San Fernando Valley Quakes.

=== Professional ===
Zaher was drafted in the 3rd round of the 2008 MLS Superdraft by Canadian Major League Soccer side Toronto FC. However, his rights were traded to D.C. United for an undisclosed pick, and he was officially signed to the development roster on 17 April 2008. He made his professional debut for DC on 19 July 2008, coming on as a second-half substitute for Bryan Namoff in a SuperLiga game against Houston Dynamo, and made his first MLS appearance came on August 20, 2008, starting against New England Revolution.

On March 16, 2009, Zaher signed a developmental contract with the San Jose Earthquakes.

Zaher featured in 10 MLS games for San Jose before being released at the end of the 2009 season; he signed terms with USL Second Division side Charleston Battery on March 23, 2010.

After two years with Charleston, Zaher signed with USL side Rochester Rhinos on November 28, 2011.

== Personal life ==
In 2006, Zaher played the male lead in the JoJo music video "Too Little Too Late".

== Honors ==
D.C. United

- Lamar Hunt U.S. Open Cup: 2008

Charleston Battery

- USL Second Division Champions: 2010
- USL Second Division Regular Season Champions: 2010
