= Levi Coleman =

American soccer player

Personal information
- Full name: Levi Coleman
- Date of birth: December 14, 1986 (age 39)
- Place of birth: Tulsa, Oklahoma, United States
- Height: 6 ft 2 in (1.88 m)
- Position: Forward

Team information
- Current team: Tulsa Athletic

College career
Years	Team	Apps	(Gls)
2006–2007	FIU Golden Panthers		
2008–2009	UMKC Kangaroos		

Senior career*
Years	Team	Apps	(Gls)
2007	Palm Beach Pumas	9	(1)
2008–2009	Kansas City Brass	17	(5)
2010–2011	Charleston Battery	27	(2)
2013–2018	Tulsa Athletic		(35)
2013–2018	Tulsa Revolution		

Managerial career
- 2018–2019: Tulsa Athletic (assistant)
- 2019–: Oral Roberts (assistant)
- 2021–2023: Tulsa Athletic
- * Club domestic league appearances and goals as of June 6, 2013

Levi Coleman (born December 14, 1986, in Tulsa, Oklahoma) is an American soccer player who currently is the head coach of Tulsa Athletic and an assistant at Oral Roberts University.

== Career ==
=== Youth and college ===
Coleman attended Broken Arrow High School in Broken Arrow, Oklahoma and played two years of college soccer at the Florida International University, before transferring to the University of Missouri-Kansas City prior to his junior year. At FIU he was named to the Conference USA all-Freshman team, while at UMKC he was a second team all-Summit League selection, and was named to the all-Newcomer team in 2008.

During his college years Coleman also played for the Palm Beach Pumas and Kansas City Brass in the USL Premier Development League.

=== Professional ===
Coleman signed his first professional contract with the Charleston Battery in April 2010 after being spotted at the 2010 USL PDL Showcase, and giving a strong performance in the pre-season Carolina Challenge Cup.

He made his professional debut, and scored his first professional goal, on April 17, 2010, in a 3–2 win over the Charlotte Eagles. On October 7, 2013, Coleman signed with the Tulsa Revolution of the Professional Arena Soccer League.

== Honors ==
=== Player ===
Charleston Battery

- USL Second Division Champions (1): 2010
- USL Second Division Regular Season Champions (1): 2010

Tulsa Athletic

- NPSL South Central Division Playoffs Champions (2): 2013, 2014
- NPSL South Central Division Regular Season Champions 2016

=== Manager ===
Tulsa Athletic

- UPSL Central Conference-North Division Regular Season Champions (1): Fall 2020
- NPSL South Heartland Division Playoff Champions (1): 2021
- NPSL South Heartland Division Regular Season Shield (1): 2022
- NPSL South Conference Playoff Champions (1): 2021
- NPSL National Playoff Runner-up: 2021
- NPSL Coach of the Season 2021
