= Seedy Bah =

Gambian footballer

Personal information
- Full name: Seedy Bah
- Date of birth: July 6, 1992 (age 34)
- Place of birth: Bakau, the Gambia
- Height: 5 ft 9 in (1.75 m)
- Position: Forward

Youth career
- 2009–2010: Bakau United

Senior career*
Years	Team	Apps	(Gls)
2011	Charleston Battery	21	(2)

International career
- Gambia U17
- * Club domestic league appearances and goals as of July 15, 2011

Seedy Bah (born July 6, 1992) is a Gambian footballer.

== Career ==
=== Professional ===
Bah was born in Bakau, and came to the United States in 2010 as part of an exchange programme with the club side Colorado Rush, who run a Rush Academy in the Gambian capital, Banjul. After trialing with Seattle Sounders FC of Major League Soccer during the spring of 2011, Bah signed with Charleston Battery in the USL Professional Division on March 23, 2011.

He made his professional debut on April 9, 2011 in a game against the Charlotte Eagles.

=== International ===
Bah has represented Gambia at U-17 level, and has also spent time with the US Development academy.
