= Nigel Marples =

Canadian football player and coach (born 1995)

Personal information
- Date of birth: November 3, 1985 (age 40)
- Place of birth: Delta, British Columbia, Canada
- Height: 5 ft 9 in (1.75 m)
- Position: Defender

Team information
- Current team: Fusion FC
- Number: 6

Youth career
- 1995–1998: North Delta SC
- 1999–2003: North Delta Huskies

College career
Years	Team	Apps	(Gls)
2003–2006	Towson Tigers		

Senior career*
Years	Team	Apps	(Gls)
2006	Abbotsford Rangers	9	(0)
2007	Vancouver Whitecaps	2	(0)
2007–2008	Philadelphia KiXX (indoor)	27	(1)
2008	Harrisburg City Islanders	19	(0)
2009–2011	Charleston Battery	55	(0)
2009	→ Harrisburg City Islanders (loan)	1	(0)
2012–2013	HB Køge	22	(0)
2013–	Fusion FC		
- * Club domestic league appearances and goals

Nigel Marples (born November 3, 1985) is a Canadian football player and coach.

== Career ==
=== College ===
Marples attended North Delta High School and played college soccer at Towson University, where he was a four-year starter and two year captain. During his college years he also played with the Abbotsford Rangers in the USL Premier Development League.

=== Professional ===
Marples joined the professional ranks after graduation with the Vancouver Whitecaps of USL First Division, but only appeared in 2 matches and was released. He then turned to indoor soccer after being drafted by the Philadelphia KiXX. He appeared in 27 games before moving back outdoors with USL Second Division Harrisburg City Islanders, and then on to the Charleston Battery in 2009.

Marples joined HB Køge from the Danish 1st Division on 9 August 2012. He left the club in summer 2013 and returned to Vancouver.

=== International ===
Marples has also spent time in the Canadian U-20 player pool, but has yet to be capped.

=== as Coach ===
After his return in summer 2013 to Canada, was named as Head coach of the Roman Tulis European Soccer School of Excellence. Since October 2013 works besides his coaching career by the Roman Tulis Soccer School, as Player-Coach of the BC Premier Soccer League side Fusion FC in Richmond. Marples studied Masters in Coaching Education over distance learning on the Ohio University. He is currently the Head Soccer Coach at the Principia School (2017).
