= Zach Prince =

American soccer player

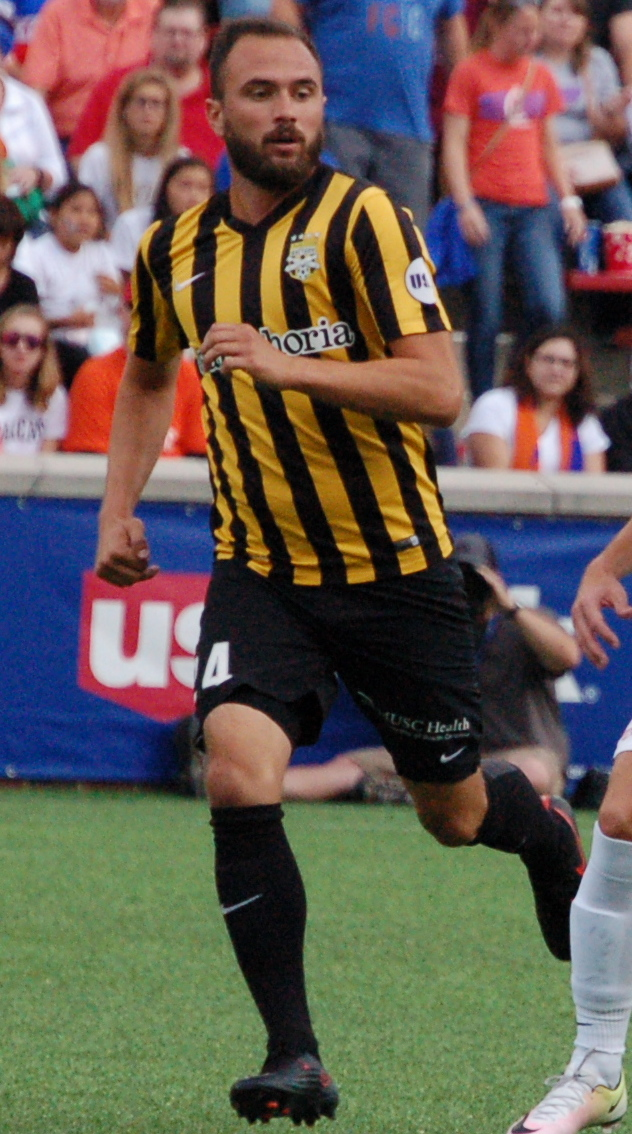
- Prince playing for Charleston Battery in 2016

Personal information
- Full name: Zach Prince
- Date of birth: March 30, 1988 (age 38)
- Place of birth: Columbia, South Carolina, United States
- Height: 6 ft 0 in (1.83 m)
- Position: Midfielder

College career
Years	Team	Apps	(Gls)
2006–2009	College of Charleston Cougars		

Senior career*
Years	Team	Apps	(Gls)
2008	Colorado Rapids U-23	16	(5)
2009	Chicago Fire Premier	6	(0)
2010–2016	Charleston Battery	162	(9)

Managerial career
- 2019–2021: New Mexico United (assistant)
- 2021–2023: New Mexico United
- 2023: New York Red Bulls (assistant)
- 2024–2025: D.C. United (assistant)
- * Club domestic league appearances and goals

Zach Prince (born March 30, 1988) is an American soccer coach and former professional soccer player who is currently an assistant coach for Major League Soccer club D.C. United. He spent his entire professional career as a midfielder with the Charleston Battery in the United Soccer League.

== Career ==
=== Youth and college ===
Prince grew up in Irmo, South Carolina and attended Irmo High School playing soccer all four years while also a member of the USYSA Region III Pool team in 2003 and 2005. He played four years of college soccer at the College of Charleston as a striker. During his college years Prince also played for Colorado Rapids U23's and Chicago Fire Premier in the USL Premier Development League, and was part of the Chicago squad which reached the 2009 PDL Championship game.

=== Professional ===
Prince signed his first professional contract with the Charleston Battery on April 14, 2010. He made his professional debut on April 17, 2010, in a 3–2 win over the Charlotte Eagles. He re-signed with the club for the 2012 season, his third, on January 13, 2012.

Prince played most commonly as an outside midfielder for the Battery, but also filled in at numerous other positions including right back and defensive midfield and was known for his competitive, physical style of play. Following the 2016 season Prince announced his retirement from professional soccer, finishing his USL career with 162 league appearances and 9 goals.

=== Managerial career ===
In 2019, Prince joined the New Mexico United organization as the first assistant to then-head coach, Troy Lesesne. In addition to the time spent in the senior side, he worked with the New Mexico United Academy in its inaugural season of 2021. On November 15, Prince was announced as the manager for the senior squad, replacing Troy Lesesne.

On June 3, 2023, Prince stepped down as New Mexico's head coach and technical director.

Prince reunited with Troy Lesesne in January 2024, joining Lesesne's staff at D.C. United in Major League Soccer.

== Honors ==
=== Charleston Battery ===
- USL Second Division Regular Season Champions (1): 2010
- USL Pro Champions (1): 2012
