= Austin Savage =

American soccer player

Personal information
- Date of birth: May 17, 1991 (age 35)
- Place of birth: Summerville, South Carolina, United States
- Height: 5 ft 9 in (1.75 m)
- Position: Forward

Youth career
- 2007–2009: Charleston Battery

College career
Years	Team	Apps	(Gls)
2009–2012	Clemson Tigers		

Senior career*
Years	Team	Apps	(Gls)
2012	Palmetto FC Bantams	14	(4)
2013	Charleston Battery	7	(0)
2014	SC United Bantams	5	(1)
2015–2016	Charleston Battery	10	(1)
2017–2019	Lowcountry United FC		
2018	Utica City FC (indoor)	0	(0)
- * Club domestic league appearances and goals as of June 6, 2017

Austin Savage (born May 17, 1991) is an American retired soccer player who played the majority of his career as a forward for the Charleston Battery in the USL.

== Career ==
Savage grew up in the Charleston area of South Carolina, attending Stratford High School and playing club soccer for Bridge Futbol Alliance, the precursor to the current Charleston Battery academy. Savage played college soccer at the Clemson University between 2009 and 2012. During his time at Clemson, Savage also played with Palmetto FC Bantams in the USL Premier Development League in 2012.

Savage signed with USL Professional Division club Charleston Battery on April 3, 2013, becoming the first player from the Battery's youth system to sign a professional contract with the first team. Savage was released by the Battery following his rookie season, and spent the majority of 2014 playing with SC United Bantams of the Premier Development League.

Savage resigned with the Battery ahead of the 2015 season, but was mainly used as a bench player. Savage scored his first and only goal for the Battery on May 9, 2016, against the Harrisburg City Islanders before announcing his retirement on June 27 of that year.

Savage signed with Major Arena Soccer League club Utica City FC on December 7, 2018, as a depth player. He did not appear in a league game.
