= Ian Fuller =

American soccer player

Personal information
- Full name: Ian Fuller
- Date of birth: August 31, 1979 (age 47)
- Place of birth: Ellensburg, Washington, United States
- Height: 6 ft 2 in (1.88 m)
- Position: Forward

College career
Years	Team	Apps	(Gls)
1998–2001	Clemson Tigers		

Senior career*
Years	Team	Apps	(Gls)
2002	New England Revolution	11	(0)
2003–2005	Rochester Raging Rhinos	38	(8)
2005	Vancouver Whitecaps	18	(2)
2006–2010	Charleston Battery	76	(5)
2010	Austin Aztex	3	(0)
2011–2013	Orlando City	35	(3)

Managerial career
- 2010: Charleston Battery (assistant)
- 2011–2014: Orlando City (assistant)
- 2015: Orlando City (assistant)
- 2016–2024: Minnesota United (assistant)
- 2025–: One Knoxville
- * Club domestic league appearances and goals as of February 2, 2016

Ian Fuller (born August 31, 1979) is an American former soccer player who currently serves as the head coach for One Knoxville in USL League One.

== Career ==
=== Youth and college ===
Fuller grew up in Tualatin, Oregon, and attended Tualatin High School where he was a three-time first team All State soccer player. He then played college soccer at Clemson University from 1998 to 2001.

=== Professional ===
Fuller was drafted in the second round (21st overall) of the 2002 MLS SuperDraft by New England Revolution. He played eleven regular season and three playoff games before being waived on November 4, 2002. In February 2003, he signed with the Rochester Rhinos of the USL First Division. Fuller spent the 2003 and 2004 seasons in Rochester, and played the first two games of the 2005 season, before moving to the Vancouver Whitecaps. In 2006, Fuller signed with the Charleston Battery. After four years with the club he moved to USSF Division 2 club Austin Aztex. With the sale and movement of the Austin Aztex to Orlando following the end of the 2010 season, Fuller was retained by the club, becoming a member of Orlando City in January 2011.

== Coaching ==
Beginning in 2010 Fuller also began working as assistant coach for the Charleston Battery of the USL Second Division (USL-2). He would continue his coaching career as a player-coach and assistant for Orlando City SC in 2011. In September 2013, Fuller retired as a player to become a full-time assistant for Orlando City.

Fuller was named head coach for USL League One club One Knoxville in December 2024.

== Honors ==
=== Player ===
Charleston Battery

- USL Second Division Champions: 2010
- USL Second Division Regular Season Champions: 2010

Orlando City

- USL Pro: 2011; 2013

=== Manager ===
One Knoxville SC

- USL League One Regular Season Champions: 2025
- USL League One Champions: 2025

== Personal ==
Fuller is married to CBS Sports Golazo Network Morning Footy host Susannah Collins.
