= Lamar Neagle =

American soccer player (born 1987)

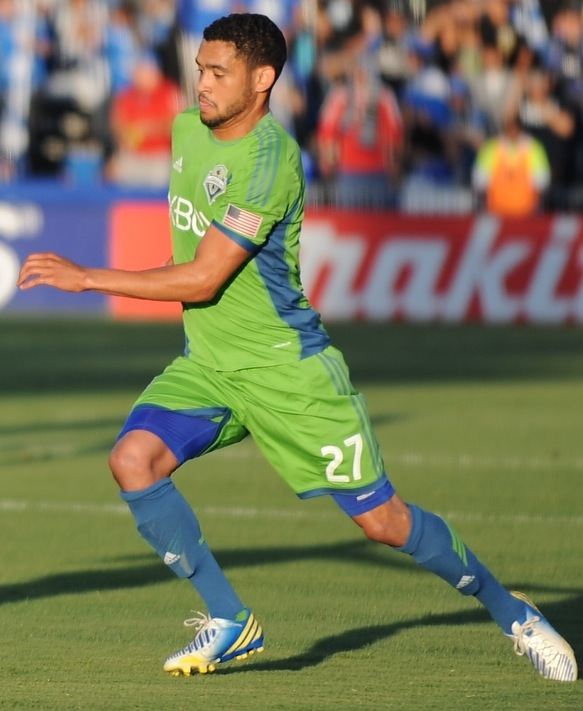

Personal information
- Full name: Lamar Justin Neagle
- Date of birth: May 7, 1987 (age 39)
- Place of birth: Tacoma, Washington, United States
- Height: 1.78 m (5 ft 10 in)
- Positions: Winger; forward

Team information
- Current team: Tacoma Stars

College career
Years	Team	Apps	(Gls)
2005–2008	UNLV Rebels	73	(27)

Senior career*
Years	Team	Apps	(Gls)
2007–2008	Des Moines Menace	24	(6)
2009	Seattle Sounders FC	0	(0)
2010	Charleston Battery	19	(12)
2010	Mariehamn	5	(2)
2011	Seattle Sounders FC	23	(5)
2012	Montreal Impact	23	(2)
2013–2015	Seattle Sounders FC	93	(21)
2016–2017	D.C. United	53	(10)
2017–2018	Seattle Sounders FC	14	(2)
2018	→ Seattle Sounders FC 2 (loan)	8	(4)
2018–20	Tacoma Stars (indoor)	20	(8)
2021–22	Tacoma Stars (indoor)	1	(0)
2025	Ballard FC	0	(0)
- * Club domestic league appearances and goals as of May 3, 2026

Lamar Neagle (born May 7, 1987) is an American formerly professional soccer player and current player-owner for Ballard FC in the amateur USL League Two. He has spent most of his career with the Seattle Sounders FC of Major League Soccer over the course of several stints; Neagle has also played for Montreal Impact and D.C. United in Major League Soccer, as well as Mariehamn in Finland.

== Career ==
=== Youth and college ===
Neagle attended Thomas Jefferson High School, where he was a three-year starter and helped them to a 16-2-4 record and the State 4A championship as a senior. He also broke a 31-year-old school record by scoring six goals in one game as well as being the Seattle Post-Intelligencer's pick for High School All-Star Team during his senior year. As a youth, Neagle also played for the Norpoint Soccer Club's Chivas soccer team located in Northeast Tacoma. While playing on the Norpoint Chivas Team, Lamar was coached by Wade Webber.

Upon graduating high school, Neagle attended and played college soccer for the University of Nevada Las Vegas. At UNLV he played on the three-time first team All-Mountain Pacific Sports Federation selection, and played every game but one in his four-year career. He also led the team in goals scored his last two seasons with a total of 9 each year. During his senior year, Neagle was named second team All-Far-West Region 2008.

During his college years he also played with Des Moines Menace of the USL Premier Development League, making 24 appearances and scoring six goals in his two years with the club.

=== Seattle Sounders FC ===
Neagle was a pre-season trialist with the Seattle Sounders FC for two weeks in Southern California. During the trials, Neagle played in two games and had two assists. After graduating university, Neagle returned to train with the team on May 13, 2009.

On June 10, 2009, the Sounders announced that Neagle had signed and been added to the official roster as a Senior Developmental player. Coach Sigi Schmid said, "It's good to sign a local product to our team. Lamar's got excellent speed and he's a player who can play in a number of positions. He's very comfortable on the flank and has played on the left side as well as the right. He will get a look from us as an outside player, either in midfield or at the back". Neagle was the fourth player from Washington state to sign with the Sounders after Chris Eylander, Kevin Forrest, and Kasey Keller.

Neagle first appeared on the Seattle roster during the highly anticipated Portland Timbers game. Neagle was also on the team roster for the Houston Dynamo and Kansas City Wizards games but sat on the bench. Neagle played in the Kitsap Pumas game which yielded a 6–0 victory. Neagle made his unofficial debut with a friendly against Chelsea on July 18, 2009. When asked about playing against English Premier League team, Neagle responded "It's kind of surreal. I grew up watching these guys play for Chelsea. You never think you're going to get a chance to play against them. It was a great experience. Pretty intimidating, but it was fun."

Neagle was waived by Seattle on November 25, 2009, having never played a competitive first team game for the team. He subsequently signed for Charleston Battery (who employ him as a forward) in the USL Second Division, and made his competitive professional debut on April 17, 2010, in a game against the Charlotte Eagles.

In September 2010, following the conclusion of the 2010 USL2 season, Neagle transferred to IFK Mariehamn of the Finnish Veikkausliiga. After a successful preseason trial, Neagle was again signed by Seattle on March 2, 2011.

In 2011, Neagle worked his way onto the pitch as a frequent sub and occasional starter for MLS matches, also playing important roles in the US Open Cup and CONCACAF Champions League. On August 27, 2011, Neagle netted the first home MLS hat-trick for the Sounders in a 6–2 victory over the Columbus Crew, at the time the leaders in the Eastern Conference.

=== Montreal Impact ===
Neagle was traded to Montreal Impact on February 18, 2012, along with teammate Mike Fucito, in exchange for Eddie Johnson.

After scoring his first goal for Montreal against his former club, Sounders FC, during the club's first match at the renovated Stade Saputo. Neagle notched his second of the MLS campaign against the San Jose Earthquakes on August 18, 2012, a 22-yard (20 m) shot that went on to win AT&T Goal of the Week honors.

=== First return to the Sounders ===
On January 27, 2013, the Sounders traded an international roster spot to the Montreal Impact in order to re-acquire Neagle for his third stint with the team.

=== D.C. United ===
Neagle was traded to D.C. United on December 7, 2015, in exchange for allocation money. On March 7, Neagle made his debut and scored his first goal with United in a 1–4 away loss to LA Galaxy in the 2016 Major League Soccer season opener. He played in total of 56 games, scored 11 goals, and recorded 6 assists.

=== Second return to the Sounders ===
On August 7, 2017, D.C. United traded Neagle to the Sounders for a fourth round pick in the 2018 MLS SuperDraft.

On November 19, 2018, Seattle declined their contract option on Neagle.

=== Indoor career ===
On March 8, 2019, Neagle signed with the Tacoma Stars of the indoor Major Arena Soccer League. He was previously on trial with Phoenix Rising of the USL Championship. Neagle joined the Federal Way Coaching staff for the 2019–20 season. He re-signed with the Tacoma Stars in October 2019 for their 2019–2020 season.

Neagle rejoined the Stars on December 10, 2021, playing with the team one game in the season.

=== Club ownership ===
In December 2021, Neagle was announced as a co-founder and co-owner of Ballard FC, a club based in Seattle in the pre-professional fourth division USL League Two starting in the 2022 season. Under Neagle's ownership, the team won its first championship in 2023. In 2025, Neagle played two games as team captain for Ballard's qualification attempt for the 2026 US Open Cup, scoring a brace in a third round 5–1 victory against Sharktopus FC.

== Personal life ==
Lamar is the son of John Brown and Bridget Neagle and Frankie and Maria Lawson. He has five siblings named Shedrick, Jamaal, Tanisha, Daisia, and Jasmine. He married Natalie Hanley on February 15, 2014.

== Career statistics ==
As of May 4, 2026

Club performance			League		Domestic Cup		League Playoffs		Continental		Total	
Season	Club	League	Apps	Goals	Apps	Goals	Apps	Goals	Apps	Goals	Apps	Goals
USA			League		Open Cup		Playoffs		North America		Total	
2007	Des Moines Menace	USL Premier Development League	13	4	0	0	0	0	—		13	4
2008	Des Moines Menace	USL Premier Development League	11	2	0	0	0	0	—		11	2
2009	Seattle Sounders FC	Major League Soccer	0	0	0	0	0	0	—		0	0
2010	Charleston Battery	USL Second Division	19	12	4	1	1	1	—		24	14
Finland			League		Finnish Cup		League Tournament		Europe		Total	
2010	IFK Mariehamn	Veikkausliiga	5	2	0	0	0	0	—		5	2
USA			League		Open Cup		Playoffs		North America		Total	
2011	Seattle Sounders FC	Major League Soccer	23	5	3	1	2	1	7	0	35	7
Canada			League		Voyageurs Cup		Playoffs		North America		Total	
2012	Montreal Impact	Major League Soccer	23	2	1	0	0	0	—		24	2
USA			League		Open Cup		Playoffs		North America		Total	
2013	Seattle Sounders FC	Major League Soccer	30	8	1	0	2	0	2	1	35	9
2014	Seattle Sounders FC	Major League Soccer	32	9	5	0	3	0	0	0	40	9
2015	Seattle Sounders FC	Major League Soccer	31	4	1	0	0	0	4	3	36	7
2016	D.C. United	Major League Soccer	31	9	0	0	1	1	—		32	10
2017	D.C. United	Major League Soccer	22	1	1	0	—		—		23	1
2017	Seattle Sounders FC	Major League Soccer	8	2	0	0	3	0	—		11	2
2018	Seattle Sounders FC	Major League Soccer	6	0	1	0	0	0	3	0	10	0
2018	Seattle Sounders FC 2	USL Championship	8	4	— (Note: As a reserve team, Seattle Sounders FC 2 are ineligible for domestic American cup tournaments.)		0	0	— (Note: As a reserve team, Seattle Sounders FC 2 are ineligible for continental cup tournaments.)		8	4
USA (Indoor)			League		— (Note: Indoor teams are ineligible for domestic American cup tournaments.)		Playoffs		— (Note: Indoor teams are ineligible for continental cup tournaments.)		Total	
2018–19	Tacoma Stars (indoor)	Major Arena Soccer League	6	1	—		2	1	—		8	2
2019–20	Tacoma Stars (indoor)	Major Arena Soccer League	14	7	—		— (Note: The 2020 MASL playoffs were canceled due to the COVID-19 pandemic.)		—		14	7
2021–22	Tacoma Stars (indoor)	Major Arena Soccer League	1	0	—		—		—		1	0
USA			League		US Open Cup		Playoffs		—		Total	
2025–26	Ballard FC	USL League Two	0	0	2	2	0	0	—		2	2
Total	USA		234	60	18	4	12	3	16	4	281	73
Total	USA (indoor)		21	8	—		2	1	—		23	9
Total	Finland		5	2	0	0	0	0	—		5	2
Total	Canada		23	2	1	0	0	0	—		24	2
Career total			283	72	19	4	14	4	16	4	333	84

== Honors ==
=== Club ===
Charleston Battery

- USL Second Division Champions (1): 2010
- USL Second Division Regular Season Champions (1): 2010

Seattle Sounders FC

- Lamar Hunt U.S. Open Cup: 2011, 2014
- MLS Supporters' Shield: 2014

=== Individual ===
- USL Second Division Most Valuable Player (1): 2010
