= Cody Ellison =

American soccer player

Personal information
- Full name: Kenneth Cody Earl Ellison
- Date of birth: October 22, 1989 (age 37)
- Place of birth: Fresno, California, United States
- Height: 6 ft 4 in (1.93 m)
- Position: Defender

Team information
- Current team: Fresno Fuego
- Number: 2

Youth career
- 2008–2011: BYU Cougars

Senior career*
Years	Team	Apps	(Gls)
2009–2011	Fresno Fuego	38	(0)
2012–2013	Charleston Battery	30	(0)
2014–	Fresno Fuego	1	(0)
- * Club domestic league appearances and goals as of February 14, 2014

Kenneth Cody Earl Ellison (born October 22, 1989, in Fresno, California) is an American soccer player, currently playing for Fresno Fuego in USL Premier Development League.
