= Stephen Armstrong =

English former footballer

Personal information
- Date of birth: 23 July 1976 (age 50)
- Place of birth: Birkenhead, England
- Position: Forward

Youth career
- 1996–1999: Butler Bulldogs

Senior career*
Years	Team	Apps	(Gls)
1998–2000	Mid-Michigan Bucks		
2000	Västra Frölunda	12	(1)
2000–2001	Watford	3	(0)
2001	D.C. United	15	(3)
2002–2003	Kansas City Wizards	55	(5)
2004	Michigan Bucks	5	(0)
2005	Columbus Crew	7	(0)
2006–2011	Charleston Battery	118	(26)
- * Club domestic league appearances and goals as of 3 June 2011

Stephen Armstrong (born 23 July 1976) is an English former footballer who spent the majority of his career with clubs in the United States.

== Career ==
=== College and amateur ===
Armstrong was born in Birkenhead, England and raised in Cape Town, South Africa. He came to the United States to attend Butler University in Indiana and finished as the school's third all-time leading scorer with 43 goals and 16 assists. During his college career Armstrong also played for the Mid-Michigan Bucks in the Premier Development League.

=== Professional ===
Armstrong was selected in the second round – 13th overall – of the 2000 MLS SuperDraft by D.C. United but he decided to begin his professional career in Sweden with Västra Frölunda instead before moving to English First Division side Watford on a free transfer in October 2000. He made three appearances for the club, all as a substitute, before being released at the end of the 2000–01 season.

He eventually returned to play for D.C. United, sixteen-months after the draft. Armstrong was traded to Kansas City for Brandon Prideaux on 11 January 2002. He spent two years with the Wizards, appearing in regular season and playoff each year.

Armstrong missed the 2004 Major League Soccer season while recovering from ACL surgery on his right knee. He joined the Columbus Crew in 2005. At the beginning of the 2006 season Armstrong signed with A-League club Charleston Battery, where he would spend the remainder of his outdoor career, and served as an assistant coach during his final season with the club.

== Honours ==
Charleston Battery

- USL Second Division: 2010
- USL Second Division Regular Season: 2010

Individual

- MISL Rookie of the Year: 2006–07
