= Edson Elcock =

American soccer player (born 1985)

Personal information
- Full name: Edson Elcock
- Date of birth: January 10, 1985 (age 41)
- Place of birth: Brooklyn, New York, United States
- Height: 5 ft 7 in (1.70 m)
- Position: Midfielder

Youth career
- 2003: Wingate Bulldogs
- 2004–2006: Old Dominion Monarchs

Senior career*
Years	Team	Apps	(Gls)
2004	Brooklyn Knights	1	(0)
2006	Virginia Beach Submariners	10	(5)
2007	Kansas City Wizards	0	(0)
2008	Puerto Rico Islanders	9	(2)
2009–2012	Richmond Kickers	69	(14)
Total		89	(21)
- * Club domestic league appearances and goals

Edson Elcock (born January 10, 1985, in Brooklyn, New York) is an American former soccer player who played as a midfielder.

== Career ==
=== College and amateur ===
Elcock attended Brooklyn Friends School, where he set the record for most goals in a season. He was also on the 2003 Brooklyn Friends basketball team which won the NYS State Championship. He played college soccer at NCAA Division II Wingate University in 2003 where he was the South Atlantic Conference Freshman of the Year. Following the 2003 season, he transferred to Old Dominion University, where he was a 2006 first team All American. In 2006, he helped lead ODU to its fifth straight NCAA tournament appearance as the Monarchs advanced for the first time to the round of 16. Elcock was also honored by the Norfolk Sports Club with the Tom Scott award which is presented to ODU's top senior student athlete.

During his college years Elcock also played for the Brooklyn Knights and the Virginia Beach Submariners in USL Premier Development League.

=== Professional ===
Elcock was drafted in the 3rd round (29th overall) in the 2007 MLS SuperDraft by the Kansas City Wizards and signed a developmental contract. He saw no first team games, only playing eight reserve team games, before being waived at the end of the season.

In 2008, Elcock signed with the Puerto Rico Islanders of the USL First Division. After playing only 9 games and scoring 2 goals for the squad, Edson resigned to continue his education.

Elcock returned to professional soccer in 2009 when he signed with the Richmond Kickers in the USL Second Division, and helped the Kickers to the 2009 USL Second Division championship. On January 14, 2010, Richmond announced the re-signing of Elcock for the 2010 season. Elcock re-signed for the 2011 season on January 5, 2011.

He returned to Richmond again for the 2012 season, agreeing terms on January 5, 2012.

== Honors ==
=== Richmond Kickers ===
- USL Second Division Champions (1): 2009
