= Colin Falvey =

Irish professional footballer and manager

Personal information
- Date of birth: 20 June 1985 (age 41)
- Place of birth: Cork, Ireland
- Position: Centre-back

Team information
- Current team: Northern Colorado Hailstorm FC (Head coach)

Youth career
- Gillingham
- Carlisle United

Senior career*
Years	Team	Apps	(Gls)
2004–2007	Cobh Ramblers	80	(8)
2007–2008	Kilkenny City	15	(3)
2008	Otago United	14	(3)
2009	Wilmington Hammerheads	18	(2)
2009–2010	YoungHeart Manawatu	12	(1)
2010–2014	Charleston Battery	104	(7)
2010–2011	→ YoungHeart Manawatu (loan)	12	(1)
2014	→ Kerala Blasters (loan)	9	(0)
2015	Ottawa Fury	32	(0)
2016–2017	Indy Eleven	52	(1)
2018	Ottawa Fury	12	(1)
2019	Chattanooga Red Wolves	3	(1)
Total		364	(28)

Managerial career
- 2022: Syracuse Pulse (assistant)
- 2023–2025: Northern Colorado Hailstorm (assistant)
- 2025–: Northern Colorado Hailstorm
- * Club domestic league appearances and goals

Colin Falvey (born 20 June 1985) is an Irish former professional footballer who played as a centre-back. He is currently the head coach at the League for Clubs side Northern Colorado Hailstorm.

== Playing career ==
=== Ireland ===
Falvey was born in Cork. He was a trainee and youth player at English clubs Gillingham and Carlisle United, but began his professional career in 2004 with Cobh Ramblers in the League of Ireland, scoring on his debut vs Athlone Town. He transferred to Kilkenny City prior to the 2007 campaign for a compensation fee because he was under the age of 23, and was made club captain upon arrival. During his time playing in Ireland, he attracted interest from Swindon Town, but opted to sign a contract with Otago United in New Zealand under ex-Irish international Terry Phelan, who would become his agent.

=== New Zealand ===
Falvey spent one year in New Zealand with Otago United, where he was club captain.

=== North America ===
Falvey signed with American side Wilmington Hammerheads in the USL Second Division for the 2009 season. He played 15 games and scored 1 goal for the Hammerheads in 2009, earning him defensive MVP honours and been selection in the league team of the season while also helping them to the 2009 USL Second Division regular season title. After the season, he returned to New Zealand on a six-month contract to play for YoungHeart Manawatu.

On 25 February 2010, it was announced that Falvey would be returning to USL league in America to sign a one-year contract with the Charleston Battery. Falvey was a key starter in his first season with the Battery as the club won the 2010 USL Second Division championship. Falvey signed on loan with previous New Zealand outfit YoungHeart Manawatu during the USL offseason before returning to Charleston to sign a long-term contract on 8 December 2011. Falvey was named the club's captain and became a fan favourite, with part of the club's supporters' group being nicknamed "Falvey's Army" during this time. Falvey won a second league championship with Charleston in 2012.

=== India ===
After leaving Charleston at the end of the 2014 season, Falvey announced he would be signing with Kerala Blasters of the Indian Super League for the final months of his contract with the Battery. Falvey made 6 appearances for Kerala in the inaugural season of the tournament.

=== Return to North America ===
Falvey signed with Ottawa Fury FC of the North American Soccer League in February 2015.

Falvey played every game of the Fury's 2015 season, helping Ottawa earn its first-ever piece of silverware, the 2015 NASL Fall Championship title, and its first-ever Soccer Bowl appearance. Falvey also helped the club set an all-time NASL clean sheet record of 648 minutes and concede the fewest goals of any club that season.

On 15 January 2016, Falvey was transferred to Indy Eleven for an undisclosed fee.

On 23 January 2018, Falvey rejoined Ottawa ahead of the 2018 USL season. He was released by the club on 28 August 2018.

On 12 November 2018, Falvey signed with USL League One expansion team Chattanooga Red Wolves SC.

== Managerial career ==
Falvey served as assistant coach of USL League One side Northern Colorado Hailstorm FC from 2023 to 2025, moving into the head coach role in September 2025 upon the departure of Éamon Zayed.

== Honours ==
Wilmington Hammerheads

- USL Second Division Regular Season: 2009

Charleston Battery

- USL Pro: 2010, 2012
- USL Pro Regular Season: 2010

Ottawa Fury

- NASL Fall Championship: 2015

Indy Eleven

- NASL Spring Championship: 2016

Individual

- United Soccer Leagues team of the season: 2009
- Youngheart Manawatu Player of the year: 2009–10
- USL Pro League Defender of the Year: 2013
