= Jose Cuevas (soccer) =

American soccer player

Personal information
- Full name: Jose Luis Cuevas
- Date of birth: June 12, 1989 (age 37)
- Place of birth: Farmersville, California, United States
- Height: 5 ft 8 in (1.73 m)
- Positions: Striker; midfielder

Senior career*
Years	Team	Apps	(Gls)
2009–2011	Fresno Fuego	44	(19)
2012–2013	Charleston Battery	47	(11)
2014	Fresno Fuego	11	(3)
2014	Charleston Battery	13	(3)
2015–2016	Arizona United	20	(3)
2016	→ Oklahoma City Energy (loan)	17	(0)
2017	Fresno Fuego	13	(11)
2018	Fresno FC	10	(1)
- * Club domestic league appearances and goals as of August 19, 2018

Jose Luis Cuevas (born June 12, 1989) is an American soccer player.

== Career ==
Cuevas played for USL Premier Development League club Fresno Fuego between 2009 and 2011, making 44 appearances and scoring 16 goals.

Cuevas impressed Charleston Battery at the 2011 USL Men's Player Combine and spent most of the 2011 pre-season with the Battery appearing in the Carolina Challenge Cup games. He signed with Charleston on January 6, 2012. Cuevas scored two goals on his professional debut against Richmond Kickers on April 7, 2012. He finished the season with 7 goals and 4 assists and was named USL Pro Rookie of the Year.

After spending the first half of the 2014 season with USL PDL club Fresno Fuego, Cuevas returned to Charleston Battery in July 2014. Cuevas signed a multi-year contract with USL Pro club Arizona United on November 12, 2014.
