= Michael Anhaeuser =

American soccer coach (born 1969)

Mike Anhaeuser
Personal information
- Full name: Michael Anhaeuser
- Date of birth: August 13, 1969 (age 57)
- Place of birth: Fort Wayne, Indiana, United States
- Height: 5 ft 11 in (1.80 m)
- Position: Midfielder

College career
Years	Team	Apps	(Gls)
1988–1991	Indiana Hoosiers		

Senior career*
Years	Team	Apps	(Gls)
1994–1998	Charleston Battery	115	(2)

Managerial career
- 1999–2004: Charleston Battery (assistant)
- 2004–2021: Charleston Battery
- * Club domestic league appearances and goals

Michael Anhaeuser (born August 13, 1969) is an American former soccer player and coach. He has spent his entire professional playing career with the Charleston Battery, playing five seasons for the club as a midfielder before moving into the coaching staff. He coached a club team named the Hot Spurs for years while working with the Charleston Battery.

== Club career ==
Anhaeuser grew up in Fort Wayne, Indiana and attended Indiana University where he played on the men's soccer team under Jerry Yeagley from 1988 to 1991. The Hoosiers won the 1988 NCAA Men's Soccer Championship in his freshman season.

Following his college career Anhaeuser trialed in Germany with Bundesliga clubs Schalke 04 and VfL Bochum and played in their reserve teams. In 1994, he signed a professional contract with the Charleston Battery of the USISL. He spent five seasons a midfielder with the Battery, making over 100 appearances and winning the 1996 league championship while also working a day job in research and development for the club's corporate parent Blackbaud. Anhaeuser tore his anterior cruciate ligament during the 1999 pre-season and retired from playing professionally.

== Coaching career ==
Anhaeuser spent much of his playing career coaching Lowcountry junior clubs and to this day continues to handle teams in the Battery's youth system. After retiring from playing in 1999, he moved into an assistant coaching role with the Battery under managers Alan Dicks and Chris Ramsey. After the departure of Ramsey in 2005, he was elevated to the position of head coach.

In 2006, he was named the USL-1 Coach of the Year after he took the Battery to the post-season semifinals and the third round of the U.S. Open Cup. The team were the first lower division side since 1999 to play in the U.S. Open Cup final, finishing as runners-up in the 2008 edition. Anhaeuser led the Battery to a USL Division 2 championship in 2010 and a USL Championship title in 2012 after the club moved up to the second division.

In 2008, he was also given the title of general manager of the Battery, overseeing all soccer operations at the club. Following the 2013 season, Anhaeuser was inducted to the USL Hall of Fame.

After 17 years as head coach of the Charleston Battery, Anhaeuser and the club parted ways on November 1, 2021.

== Honors ==
=== Player ===
Charleston Battery

- USISL Professional League: 1996

=== Coach ===
Charleston Battery

- USL Second Division: 2010
- USL Pro: 2012
