= Nicki Paterson =

Scottish footballer

Personal information
- Full name: Nicholas Stephen Paterson
- Date of birth: 19 January 1985 (age 41)
- Place of birth: Lanark, Scotland
- Position: Midfielder

Youth career
- Motherwell

College career
Years	Team	Apps	(Gls)
2005–2008	UNLV	68	(4)

Senior career*
Years	Team	Apps	(Gls)
2002–2004	Hamilton Academical	7	(15)
2007–2008	Des Moines Menace	28	(0)
2009	Harrisburg City Islanders	18	(0)
2010	Real Maryland Monarchs	19	(0)
2010–2011	Clyde	16	(0)
2011–2013	Charleston Battery	78	(0)
2014–2015	Ottawa Fury	26	(0)
2016	Indy Eleven	27	(0)
2017	East Fife	15	(0)
2017–2019	Stenhousemuir	17	(0)
2019–2020	Albion Rovers	9	(0)
- * Club domestic league appearances and goals as of 7 November 2023

Nicholas Stephen "Nicki" Paterson (born 19 January 1985) is a Scottish former footballer who plays as a midfielder.

== Career ==
=== Early career ===
Paterson grew up in Motherwell, and was a member of the academy at Scottish football club Motherwell, before signing a professional deal with Hamilton Academical in 2002. He made his professional debut on 3 August 2002 in a Scottish Second Division game against Cowdenbeath as a 17-year-old. He went on to play seven league, two Scottish League Cup and one Scottish Challenge Cup games for Hamilton over the next two seasons, usually from the substitute's bench, before leaving at the end of the 2003–2004 season.

=== College and amateur ===
Paterson moved to the United States in 2005 after being offered a college scholarship by the University of Nevada Las Vegas. He played four years college soccer for the UNLV Rebels, earning Second Team All-Mountain Pacific Sports Federation honours as a sophomore in 2006. During his college years Paterson also played two seasons for Des Moines Menace in the USL Premier Development League scoring 15 goals earning top scorer in both seasons.

=== Professional ===
Paterson returned to the professional ranks in 2009 when he was signed by the Harrisburg City Islanders of the USL Second Division. He made his debut for Harrisburg on 18 April 2009 in a 2–2 opening day tie with the Richmond Kickers.

After playing for USL-2 club Real Maryland Monarchs in 2010, Paterson transferred up a division to USSF Division 2 club AC St. Louis. However, after only a few days at the club it emerged that Paterson could not extend his current visa and had to return to the UK with an option to sign with AC St. Louis next season.

While home Paterson signed a short-term contract for Scottish side Clyde in September 2010, and played his first game for the team on 25 September, a 0–0 draw against East Stirlingshire. He scored his first goal for the Bully Wee on 16 October, in a 3–2 loss to Arbroath.

Paterson signed a contract on 21 January 2011 to play for Charleston Battery in the American Soccer USL Pro league. He led the team in scoring with 8 goals and was named the offensive MVP. He moved indoors for the 2011–12 season with the Baltimore Blast. In 2012, Paterson increased his offensive output from his midfield position and was the league's second top scorer with 10 goals amassing 22 points. He was selected 7 times to the USL Team of the week. Paterson for the second year running was named the Offensive MVP for the Charleston Battery and added the overall team MVP.

On 6 November 2013, he became Ottawa Fury FC's first signing.

Paterson signed with the NASL's Indy Eleven on 26 January 2016. After almost a year with the club, Paterson returned to his native Scotland, signing for Scottish League One side East Fife until the end of the 2016–17 season, at which point his contract was not renewed and he left the club.

Paterson subsequently signed a short-term contract with Scottish League Two club Stenhousemuir in September 2017.

Ahead of the 2019–20 season, Paterson signed for Albion Rovers.
