= 2010 United Soccer Leagues =

The 2010 season is the 24th season played by the United Soccer Leagues. Season titles will be contested by 6 professional men's clubs in the USL Second Division, 29 professional and amateur women's clubs in the W-League, and 68 professional and amateur men's teams in the USL Premier Development League.

The remaining USL First Division teams that did not break away to form the North American Soccer League, as well as the NASL teams, will play in the D2 Pro League this year.

The Second Division season started on April 17 with 3 games: Charleston Battery at Charlotte Eagles, Richmond Kickers hosting Harrisburg City Islanders, and Pittsburgh Riverhounds at Real Maryland Monarchs. The season closed on August 14 with Pittsburgh at Harrisburg, Real Maryland at Richmond, and Charleston hosting Charlotte.

== Second Division ==
USL Second Division
- Season: 2010
- Champions: Charleston Battery (3rd Title)
- Regular Season title: Charleston Battery (1st Title)
- Matches: 60
- Goals: 147 (2.45 per match)
- Best Player: (United States) Lamar Neagle Charleston Battery
- Top goalscorer: (United States) Lamar Neagle Charleston Battery (12 Goals)
- Best goalkeeper: (United States) Hunter Gilstrap Pittsburgh Riverhounds
- Longest winning run: Charleston (5)
- Longest unbeaten run: Charleston (7)
- Longest losing run: Harrisburg/Real Maryland (4)

=== Regular season ===
==== Changes from 2009 ====
- Bermuda Hogges left to compete in USL Premier Development League.
- Charleston Battery enter competition this year from USL First Division.
- Crystal Palace Baltimore left to compete in USSF Division 2 Professional League.
- Western Mass Pioneers left to compete in USL Premier Development League.
- Wilmington Hammerheads went on hiatus.

==== Standings ====
USL Second Division
| Pos | Team | Pld | W | L | T | GF | GA | GD | Pts | Qualification |
|---|---|---|---|---|---|---|---|---|---|---|
| 1 | Charleston Battery | 20 | 11 | 4 | 5 | 35 | 25 | +10 | 38 | Regular season champion |
| 2 | Richmond Kickers | 20 | 9 | 5 | 6 | 25 | 20 | +5 | 33 | Playoff spot clinched |
| 3 | Pittsburgh Riverhounds | 20 | 7 | 5 | 8 | 27 | 20 | +7 | 29 | Playoff spot clinched |
| 4 | Charlotte Eagles | 20 | 5 | 8 | 7 | 23 | 30 | −7 | 22 | |
| 5 | Harrisburg City Islanders | 20 | 4 | 9 | 7 | 21 | 30 | −9 | 19 | |
| 6 | Real Maryland Monarchs | 20 | 3 | 8 | 9 | 16 | 22 | −6 | 18 | |

Source: official USL-2 standings table

==== Results ====
Abbreviation and Color Key: Charleston Battery – CHS • Charlotte Eagles – CHA • Harrisburg City Islanders – HAR Pittsburgh Riverhounds – PIT • Real Maryland Monarchs – RMM • Richmond Kickers – RIC Home • Away • Win • Loss • Draw
| Club | Match | | | | | | | | | | | | | | | | | | | |
| Club | 1 | 2 | 3 | 4 | 5 | 6 | 7 | 8 | 9 | 10 | 11 | 12 | 13 | 14 | 15 | 16 | 17 | 18 | 19 | 20 |
|---|---|---|---|---|---|---|---|---|---|---|---|---|---|---|---|---|---|---|---|---|
| Charleston Battery | CHA | PIT | RMM | CHA | HAR | PIT | PIT | HAR | RMM | HAR | RIC | RIC | RIC | RIC | RMM | HAR | RMM | CHA | PIT | CHA |
| Charleston Battery | 3–2 | 0–0 | 1–0 | 2–1 | 3–1 | 2–1 | 4–3 | 1–2 | 2–2 | 1–1 | 1–3 | 4–1 | 0–2 | 1–0 | 1–0 | 3–2 | 0–0 | 2–2 | 1–2 | 3–0 |
| Charlotte Eagles | CHS | RIC | CHS | HAR | PIT | RIC | RMM | HAR | HAR | RMM | PIT | RIC | PIT | HAR | RIC | RMM | PIT | CHS | RMM | CHS |
| Charlotte Eagles | 2–3 | 1–0 | 1–2 | 2–0 | 2–1 | 1–3 | 0–0 | 0–0 | 2–1 | 0–2 | 1–3 | 1–1 | 2–1 | 1–2 | 1–1 | 1–1 | 1–2 | 2–2 | 2–2 | 0–3 |
| Harrisburg City Islanders | RIC | RMM | CHA | CHS | RMM | CHS | CHA | CHS | CHA | PIT | RIC | CHA | RMM | RMM | PIT | CHS | RIC | PIT | RIC | PIT |
| Harrisburg City Islanders | 2–2 | 0–2 | 0–2 | 1–3 | 2–3 | 2–1 | 0–0 | 1–1 | 1–2 | 1–1 | 0–1 | 2–1 | 1–0 | 3–2 | 1–1 | 2–3 | 0–2 | 1–1 | 0–1 | 1–1 |
| Pittsburgh Riverhounds | RMM | CHS | RIC | CHS | CHA | CHS | RIC | RMM | HAR | CHA | RMM | CHA | RIC | HAR | CHA | RIC | RMM | HAR | CHS | HAR |
| Pittsburgh Riverhounds | 0–0 | 0–0 | 1–1 | 1–2 | 1–2 | 3–4 | 3–1 | 0–0 | 1–1 | 3–1 | 2–0 | 1–2 | 2–0 | 1–1 | 2–1 | 0–1 | 2–0 | 1–1 | 2–1 | 1–1 |
| Real Maryland Monarchs | PIT | HAR | CHS | RIC | RIC | HAR | RIC | CHA | CHS | PIT | CHA | PIT | HAR | HAR | CHS | CHA | CHS | PIT | CHA | RIC |
| Real Maryland Monarchs | 0–0 | 2–0 | 0–1 | 0–1 | 1–1 | 3–2 | 0–2 | 0–0 | 2–2 | 0–0 | 2–0 | 0–2 | 0–1 | 2–3 | 0–1 | 1–1 | 0–0 | 0–2 | 2–2 | 1–1 |
| Richmond Kickers | HAR | CHA | RMM | PIT | RMM | RMM | CHA | PIT | CHS | CHS | HAR | CHA | CHS | CHS | CHA | PIT | PIT | HAR | HAR | RMM |
| Richmond Kickers | 2–2 | 0–1 | 1–0 | 1–1 | 1–1 | 2–0 | 3–1 | 1–3 | 3–1 | 1–4 | 1–0 | 1–1 | 2–0 | 0–1 | 1–1 | 0–2 | 1–0 | 2–0 | 1–0 | 1–1 |

=== Playoffs ===
| USL-2 Semifinal | | | USL-2 Championship |
| | | | 1 | Charleston Battery | 2 |
| 2 | Richmond Kickers | 2 | 2 | Richmond Kickers | 1 |
| 3 | Pittsburgh Riverhounds | 0 |

=== Semifinal ===
August 21, 2010
5:00 PM EDT

| Richmond Kickers | 2 – 0 | Pittsburgh Riverhounds |
|---|---|---|
| Delicâte 35'; Foglesong 50'; Kabwe (yellow card) 65'; Burke (yellow card) 90' | Report | Kouadio (yellow card) 90' |

University of Richmond Stadium
Richmond, VA
Attendance: 2,276
Referee: Mark Gorak (USA)

=== Championship ===
August 28, 2010
6:00 PM EDT

| Charleston Battery | 2 – 1 | Richmond Kickers |
|---|---|---|
| Neagle 26' (yellow card) 83'; Falvey (red card) 30'; Fuller 52'; Woodbine (yellow card) 79' | Report | Elcock 73'; Burke (yellow card) 83'; Yomby (yellow card) 83' |

Blackbaud Stadium
Charleston, SC
Attendance: 4,523
Referee: Jose Carlos Rivero (USA)

== Premier Development League ==
- See 2010 PDL season
