= 2016 Charleston Battery season =

Charleston Battery
2016 season
- President: Andrew Bell
- Head coach: Michael Anhaeuser
- Stadium: MUSC Health Stadium
- USL: Conference: TBD
- USL Playoffs: TBD
Home colors	Away colors

The 2016 Charleston Battery season was the club's 24th year of existence, and their seventh season in the third tier of the United States Soccer Pyramid. It is their sixth season in the United Soccer League as part of the Eastern Conference.

== Roster ==
Note: Flags indicate national team as defined under FIFA eligibility rules; some limited exceptions apply. Players may hold more than one non-FIFA nationality. Squad correct as of March 29, 2016.

No.	Pos.	Nation	Player
1	GK	GRE	Alexandros Tabakis (on loan from Atlanta United FC)
3	DF	USA	Forrest Lasso
4	DF	USA	Taylor Mueller
6	DF	USA	Shawn Ferguson
7	DF	JAM	O'Brian Woodbine
8	MF	TTO	Neveal Hackshaw
9	FW	JAM	Romario Williams (on loan from Atlanta United FC)
10	MF	TTO	Ataullah Guerra
11	DF	ANT	Quinton Griffith
12	MF	CUB	Maikel Chang
13	FW	ECU	José Nazareno
15	DF	GHA	Emmanuel Adjetey
16	FW	CUB	Heviel Cordoves
17	FW	CRC	Ricky Garbanzo
19	MF	USA	Dante Marini
20	MF	USA	Justin Portillo
22	GK	USA	Kevin Corby
23	GK	CUB	Odisnel Cooper
24	MF	USA	Zach Prince
25	FW	USA	Chris Tsonis
26	FW	USA	Austin Savage
40	FW	USA	Conor Sloan
—	FW	GHA	Jeffrey Otoo (on loan from Atlanta United FC)

== Competitions ==
=== Preseason ===
March 19, 2016 Friendly	Charleston Battery	3–0	New York Cosmos	Charleston, South Carolina
7:30 PM EST	Garbanzo 32', 73'; Woodbine (yellow card) 69'; Marini 80'	Report	Ayoze (yellow card) 64'	Stadium: MUSC Health Stadium; Attendance: 3,363

=== USL Regular season ===
==== Standings ====
Pos	Team	Pld	W	D	L	GF	GA	GD	Pts	Qualification
4	Rochester Rhinos	30	13	12	5	38	25	+13	51	Conference Playoffs
5	Charlotte Independence	30	14	8	8	48	29	+19	50	Conference Playoffs
6	Charleston Battery	30	13	9	8	38	33	+5	48	Conference Playoffs
7	Richmond Kickers	30	12	9	9	33	26	+7	45	Conference Playoffs
8	Orlando City B	30	9	8	13	35	49	−14	35	Conference Playoffs

Source: 2016 USL Standings
Rules for classification: 1) total wins; 2) total goal differential; 3) total goals scored; 4) points earned against top four Conference finishers; 5) disciplinary points; 6) coin toss or drawing of lots

==== Matches ====
Win Draw Loss Upcoming fixture

March 26, 2016 USL 1	Charleston Battery	1–0	FC Cincinnati	Charleston, South Carolina
7:30 PM (EDT)	Lasso (yellow card) 47'; Garbanzo (yellow card) 55'; Portillo (yellow card) 90'; Williams 90+4'	Report	Tomaselli (yellow card) 71'	Stadium: MUSC Health Stadium; Attendance: 4,394; Referee: Leland Grant

April 1, 2016 USL 2	Orlando City B	0–0	Charleston Battery	Melbourne, Florida
7:30 PM (EDT)	Rocha (yellow card) 6' (yellow-red card) 50'; Smith (yellow card) 76'	Report		Stadium: Titan Soccer Complex; Attendance: 1,123

April 9, 2016 USL 3	Charleston Battery	2–1	Wilmington Hammerheads FC	Charleston, South Carolina
7:30 PM (EDT)	Williams 2'; Prince (yellow card) 51'; Mueller 85'; Portillo (yellow card) 90'	Report	Moose (yellow card) 29'; Perone 31'; Lawal (yellow card) 67'	Stadium: MUSC Health Stadium

April 16, 2016 USL 4	Charlotte Independence	3–2	Charleston Battery	Charlotte, North Carolina
7:00 PM (EDT)	Martínez 26' (yellow card) 28'; Brian Brown 31'; Herrera 70'	Report	Hackshaw (yellow card) 56'; Ferguson (yellow card) 73'; Williams 77' (yellow card) 88'; Prince (red card) 83'; Portillo 87'	Stadium: Ramblewood Soccer Complex

April 24, 2016 USL 5	Bethlehem Steel FC	0–0	Charleston Battery	Bethlehem, Pennsylvania
3:00 PM (EDT)	Chambers (yellow card) 87'	Report	Woodbine (yellow card) 33'; Mueller (yellow card) 56'	Stadium: Goodman Stadium; Attendance: 2,640

April 30, 2016 USL 6	Charleston Battery	1–1	Pittsburgh Riverhounds	Charleston, South Carolina
7:30 PM (EDT)	Portillo 66' (pen.)	Report	Parkes 30'; Gilstrap (yellow card) 38'	Stadium: MUSC Health Stadium

May 6, 2016 USL 7	Rochester Rhinos	3–2	Charleston Battery	Rochester, New York
7:00 PM (EDT)	Farrell 11'; Garzi (yellow card) 22'; Forbes 28'; Volesky (yellow card) 37'; Kamdem (yellow card) 68' (goal) 75' (pen.)	Report	Williams 15'; Chang (yellow card) 21'; Garbonzo 49'; Hackshaw (yellow card) 73'	Stadium: Rochester Rhinos Stadium; Attendance: 4,162

May 9, 2016 USL 8	Harrisburg City Islanders	2–3	Charleston Battery	Harrisburg, Pennsylvania
7:00 PM (EDT)	Wilson 27', 54'; Thomas (yellow card) 42'; Warshaw (yellow card) 50'	Report	Williams 24'; Lasso 43' (yellow card) 59'; Chang (yellow card) 45'; Prince (yellow card) 72'; Savage 80'; Cooper (yellow card) 90'	Stadium: FNB Field; Attendance: 839

May 14, 2016 USL 9	Charleston Battery	2–0	Toronto FC II	Charleston, South Carolina
7:30 PM (EDT)	Williams 10'; Chang 47'	Report	Taintor (yellow card) 22'; Boskovic (yellow card) 40'; Hundal (yellow card) 59'	Stadium: MUSC Health Stadium; Attendance: 5,481

May 21, 2016 USL 10	Wilmington Hammerheads FC	0–1	Charleston Battery	Wilmington, North Carolina
7:00 PM (EDT)	Michaud (yellow card) 59'; Barnes-Homer (yellow card) 67'; Miller (red card) 78'	Report	Ferguson 33'; Garbonzo (yellow card) 63'; Prince (yellow card) 69'; Portillo (yellow card) 76'	Stadium: Legion Stadium; Attendance: 2,958

May 28, 2016 USL 11	Charleston Battery	0–2	Louisville City FC	Charleston, South Carolina
7:30 PM (EDT)	Portillo (yellow card) 48'; Williams (red card) 51'	Report	Davis 20'; Smith 38'; Newnam (yellow card) 59'; McCabe (yellow card) 90'	Stadium: MUSC Health Stadium

June 4, 2016 USL 12	Pittsburgh Riverhounds	1–2	Charleston Battery	Pittsburgh, Pennsylvania
7:00 PM (EDT)	Vincent 50'; Campbell (red card) 90+4'	Report	Woodbine 37' (pen.); Mueller 42'; Tsonis (yellow card) 66'; Garbonzo (yellow card) 68'	Stadium: Highmark Stadium; Attendance: 2,905

June 11, 2016 USL 13	Charleston Battery	1–2	Orlando City B	Charleston, South Carolina
5:00 PM (EDT)	Chang (yellow card) 12'; Prince (yellow card) 20'; Lasso (yellow card) 42'; Portillo 45' (pen.)	Report	Cox 15'; Donovan 42'; Turner (yellow card) 45' (yellow-red card) 45'	Stadium: MUSC Health Stadium

June 18, 2016 USL 14	Charleston Battery	1–0	Harrisburg City Islanders	Charleston, South Carolina
7:30 PM (EDT)	Woodbine (yellow card) 63'; Portillo 83'	Report		Stadium: MUSC Health Stadium; Attendance: 3,150

June 26, 2016 USL 15	Toronto FC II	0–1	Charleston Battery	Vaughan, Ontario
7:30 PM (EDT)	Thomas (yellow card) 70' (yellow-red card) 90+3'; Daniels (yellow card) 74'	Report	Ferguson (yellow card) 70'; Williams 79'; Garbonzo (yellow card) 89'	Stadium: Ontario Soccer Centre; Attendance: 1,069

July 2, 2016 USL 16	Charleston Battery	2–0	Richmond Kickers	Charleston, South Carolina
7:30 PM (EDT)	Mueller 29'; Cordovés 36'; Marini (red card) 77'	Report	Ownby (yellow card) 86'	Stadium: MUSC Health Stadium; Referee: Vincent Chiarella

July 9, 2016 USL 17	Louisville City FC	1–1	Charleston Battery	Louisville, Kentucky
7:30 PM (EDT)	Hoffman 62'; Newnam (yellow card) 62'	Report	Cordovés (yellow card) 59'; Williams (yellow card) 74'; Prince (yellow card) 78'; Tsonis 84'	Stadium: Louisville Slugger Field; Attendance: 7,526

July 13, 2016 USL 18	Charleston Battery	0–0	Orlando City B	Charleston, South Carolina
7:30 PM (EDT)	Portillo (yellow card) 42'; Garbanzo (yellow card) 89'	Report	Ellis-Hayden (yellow card) 5' da Silva (yellow card) 81'	Stadium: MUSC Health Stadium; Attendance: 3,153

July 23, 2016 USL 19	New York Red Bulls II	2–3	Charleston Battery	Harrison, New Jersey
4:00 PM (EDT)	Bonomo 55' (red card) 90+10'; O'Toole 61'	Report	Chang 9'; Williams 29'; Cordovés 66'	Stadium: Red Bull Arena

July 30, 2016 USL 20	FC Cincinnati	1–1	Charleston Battery	Cincinnati, Ohio
7:00 PM (EDT)	Cummings 51'; Delbridge (yellow card) 68'	Report	Lasso (yellow card) 63'; Cordovés 70'	Stadium: Nippert Stadium; Attendance: 19,229; Referee: Marcos Deoliveira

August 3, 2016 USL 21	Charleston Battery	1–1	Charlotte Independence	Charleston, South Carolina
7:30 PM (EDT)	Williams 8'; Woodbine (yellow card) 48'	Report	Kalungi (yellow card) 28'; Davidson (yellow card) 58'; Calvert 65'; Martínez (yellow card) 86'	Stadium: MUSC Health Stadium

August 13, 2016 USL 22	Charleston Battery	1-3	FC Montreal	Charleston, South Carolina
7:30 PM (EDT)	Garbanzo (yellow card) 11'; Williams (yellow card) 75'; Chang 78'	Summary	Sukunda (yellow card) 12'; Jimmy Shammar-Sanon 39'; Tabla 64'; Louis Béland-Goyette 86'	Stadium: MUSC Health Stadium

August 17, 2016 USL 23	Richmond Kickers	v	Charleston Battery	Richmond, Virginia
7:00 PM (EDT)				Stadium: City Stadium

August 20, 2016 USL 24	Wilmington Hammerheads FC	1-1	Charleston Battery	Wilmington, North Carolina
7:00 PM (EDT)	Binns 43'; Fairclough (yellow card) 52'	Summary	Woodbine (yellow card) 29' (goal) 45+2'; Prince (yellow card) 33'	Stadium: Legion Stadium

August 27, 2016 USL 25	Charleston Battery	1-0	Charlotte Independence	Charleston, South Carolina
7:30 PM (EDT)	Chang 50'; Tsonis (yellow card) 90+1'	Summary		Stadium: MUSC Health Stadium

August 31, 2016 USL 23	Richmond Kickers	1-1	Charleston Battery	Richmond, Virginia
7:00 PM (EDT)	Grant 50'; Jane (yellow card) 89'	Summary	Portillo (yellow card) 28' (goal) 69'; Williams (yellow card) 43'; Griffith (yellow card) 90+3'	Stadium: City Stadium

September 3, 2016 USL 26	Charleston Battery	1-2	Rochester Rhinos	Charleston, South Carolina
7:30 PM (EDT)	Portillo 15' (pen.); Guerra (yellow card) 90'	Summary	Apostolopoulos (yellow card) 14'; Volesky 25'; Duba (yellow card) 27'; Fall (yellow card) 27'; Bakayoko 80'; Samuels (yellow card) 90'	Stadium: MUSC Health Stadium

September 7, 2016 USL 27	FC Montreal	2-1	Charleston Battery	Montreal Quebec
4:00 PM (EDT)	Jackson-Hamel 14'; Yoseke (yellow card) 48'; Mkungilwa (red card) 56'; Jimmy Shammar-Sanon 81'	Summary	Jeremy Ebobisse 40'; Garbanzo (yellow card) 66'	Stadium: Complexe sportif Claude-Robillard

September 10, 2016 USL 28	Charleston Battery	2-1	Bethlehem Steel FC	Charleston, South Carolina
7:30 PM (EDT)	Guerra 10' 39'; Ferguson (yellow card) 34'; Woodbine (yellow card) 45'; Garbanzo (yellow card) 53'	Summary	Chambers (yellow card) 32'; Jones 35'; Burke (yellow card) 41'; Edu (yellow card) 43'; Washington (yellow card) 53'; Bibbs (yellow card) 71'	Stadium: MUSC Health Stadium

September 17, 2016 USL 29	Richmond Kickers	1-2	Charleston Battery	Richmond, Virginia
5:00 PM (EDT)	Imura 34' (pen.)	Summary	Ferguson (yellow card) 38'; Guerra (yellow card) 50'; Prince (yellow card) 62'; Williams 71'; Chang 86'	Stadium: City Stadium

September 24, 2016 USL 30	Charleston Battery	1-2	New York Red Bulls II	Charleston, South Carolina
7:30 PM (EDT)	Marini 50'; Prince (yellow card) 55'; Woodbine (yellow card) 77'; Griffith (yellow card) 79'; Mueller (yellow card) 81'; Hackshaw (yellow card) 90'	Summary	Bezecourt 38'; Simpara (yellow card) 53'; Carroll (yellow card) 74'; Allen 75' (pen.) (yellow card) 84'	Stadium: MUSC Health Stadium

=== Usl Pro playoffs ===
October 2, 2016 QF	FC Cincinnati	1-2	Charleston Battery	Cincinnati
5:00 PM (EDT)	Stevenson 19'	Summary	Tsonis 41'; Chang (yellow card) 62'; Prince 65'	Stadium: Nippert Stadium

October 8, 2016 Semi-finals	Louisville City FC	v	Charleston Battery	Louisville, Kentucky
7:30 PM (EDT)				Stadium: Louisville Slugger Field

Schedule source

=== U.S. Open Cup ===
May 18, 2016 Second round	Charleston Battery (South Carolina)	Forfeit; 3–0 awarded to Charleston	(Florida) The Villages SC	Charleston, South Carolina
7:30 PM EDT	Marini 45'; Tsonis 82'	Report	Araujo 23', 67'	Stadium: MUSC Health Stadium; Referee: David Erbacher
Note: Game was tied 2–2 after extra time, and the Villages won 4–2 in penalties. The Villages SC were disqualified from the tournament after the Battery protested their use of a player cup-tied to Boca Raton FC.

June 1, 2016 Third round	Jacksonville Armada FC (Florida)	2–1 (a.e.t.)	(South Carolina) Charleston Battery	Jacksonville, Florida
7:00 PM EDT	Otte 17'; Sandoval (yellow card) 36'; Keita 108'		Tsonis 22'; Adjetey (yellow card) 47'	Stadium: Southern Oak Stadium; Referee: Kevin Terry Jr.

=== Midseason Friendlies ===
July 6, 2016 Friendly	Charleston Battery (United States)	1–2	(Scotland) Rangers F.C.	Charleston, South Carolina
7:30 PM EDT	Guerra 81'	Report	Windass 58'; Forrester 78'	Stadium: MUSC Health Stadium

July 16, 2016 Friendly	Charleston Battery (United States)	0–1	Nigeria Olympic	Atlanta, Georgia
8:00 PM EDT		Report	Amuzie 33'	Stadium: Silverbacks Park
