= 2014 Charleston Battery season =

Charleston Battery
2014 season
- Owner: (England) Tony Bakker
- Manager: (United States) Michael Anhaeuser
- Stadium: Blackbaud Stadium
- USL Pro: 5th
- USL Pro Playoffs: Quarter Finals
- U.S. Open Cup: Third Round
- Carolina Challenge Cup: 4th
- Highest home attendance: 5,415 (May 24 v. Pittsburgh)
- Lowest home attendance: League: 2,214 (July 22 v. Richmond); All: 1,428 (May 28 v. Orlando City U-23)
- Average home league attendance: 3,993
Home colors	Away colors

The Charleston Battery played their 22nd season in 2014. It was the Battery's fifth consecutive year in the third tier of American soccer, playing in the USL Professional Division for their fourth season.

== Competitions ==
=== Preseason ===
February 19, 2014 Friendly	Charleston Battery	1–1	Coastal Carolina Chanticleers	Charleston, South Carolina
19:15 EST	Teos 45'		Garbanzo 21'	Stadium: Blackbaud Stadium

March 7, 2014 Friendly	Charleston Battery	2–0	NAIA All-Stars	Charleston, South Carolina
19:15 EST				Stadium: Blackbaud Stadium

March 11, 2014 Friendly	Charleston Battery	1–0	Wilmington Hammerheads	Charleston, South Carolina
19:15 EST	Diouf 90'	Report		Stadium: Blackbaud Stadium

March 13, 2014 Friendly	College of Charleston Cougars	1–4	Charleston Battery	Charleston, South Carolina
19:15 EST	Rittmeyer 69' (pen.)	Report	Mena 22', 25'; Marini 60'; Griffith 65'	Stadium: CofC Soccer Stadium at Patriots Point

March 15, 2014 Friendly	Charleston Battery	2–0	Clemson Tigers	Charleston, South Carolina
19:15 EST	Prince 10'; Mena 35'	Report		Stadium: Blackbaud Stadium

March 18, 2014 Friendly	Charleston Battery	7–0	Georgia Southern Eagles	Charleston, South Carolina
19:15 EST	Prince; Cordovés vanSchaik; Mena; Diouf	Report		Stadium: Blackbaud Stadium

==== Carolina Challenge Cup ====
February 22, 2014 1	Charleston Battery	1–2	Seattle Sounders FC	Charleston, South Carolina
19:15 EST	Falvey 28', (yellow card) 73'; Mueller (yellow card) 51'; Kelly (yellow card) 71'	Report	Alonso 25', (yellow card) 77'; Evans 89' (pen.)	Stadium: Blackbaud Stadium; Attendance: 5,175

February 26, 2014 2	Charleston Battery	1–1	D.C. United	Charleston, South Carolina
19:30 EST	Ruggles 90+'	Report	Silva 72'	Stadium: Blackbaud Stadium

March 1, 2014 3	Charleston Battery	0–2	Houston Dynamo	Charleston, South Carolina
19:15 EST		Report	Cascio 54'; Barnes 64'	Stadium: Blackbaud Stadium

=== USL Pro ===
All times from this point on Eastern Daylight Saving Time (UTC-04:00)

=== Results summary ===
Overall								Home						Away					
Pld	W	D	L	GF	GA	GD	Pts	W	D	L	GF	GA	GD	W	D	L	GF	GA	GD
28	11	8	9	36	31	+5	41	7	6	1	24	12	+12	4	2	8	12	19	−7

Source: Match reports

Round	1	2	3	4	5	6	7	8	9	10	11	12	13	14	15	16	17	18	19	20	21	22	23	24	25	26	27	28
Stadium	H	H	A	H	A	A	A	A	H	A	H	A	H	A	H	A	H	A	H	A	A	H	H	H	A	A	H	H
Result	D	D	L	D	D	L	W	W	L	L	W	L	W	L	D	L	D	W	W	D	D	D	W	W	W	L	W	W

Updated to match(es) played on September 5, 2014. Source: Match reports
A = Away; H = Home; W = Win; D = Draw; L = Loss

==== Results ====
March 22, 2014 1	Charleston Battery	1–1	Orlando City	Charleston, South Carolina
7:30 p.m.	Diouf 65'; Griffith (red card) 90+3'	Report	'da Luz 75'	Stadium: Blackbaud Stadium; Attendance: 3,773; Referee: Matthew Jozaitis

March 29, 2014 2	Charleston Battery	2–2	Richmond Kickers	Charleston, South Carolina
7:30 p.m.	vanSchaik 22'; Sanyang 59' (yellow card) 71'	Report	Davis 14', 67'; Yomby (yellow card) 58'; Johnson (yellow card) 89'	Stadium: Blackbaud Stadium; Attendance: 3,524; Referee: Agostino Minasola

April 12, 2014 3	Orlando City	1–0	Charleston Battery	Lake Buena Vista, Florida
7:30 p.m.	Span 73'; Turner (yellow card) 76'	Report	Prince (yellow card) 49'	Stadium: Hess Field 17, ESPN WWOS; Attendance: 4,826; Referee: Caleb Mendez

April 18, 2014 4	Charleston Battery	1–1	New York Red Bulls Reserves	Charleston, South Carolina
7:30 p.m.	Abdallah (yellow card) 62'; Prince (yellow card) 65'; Kelly 74'; Falvey (yellow card) 79' (red card) 89'	Report	Bustamante 66' (pen.); Meara (yellow card) 79' (red card) 79'; Stevenson (yellow card) 79'	Stadium: Blackbaud Stadium; Attendance: 2,674; Referee: Howard Ash

April 26, 2014 5	Pittsburgh Riverhounds	0–0	Charleston Battery	Pittsburgh, Pennsylvania
6:00 p.m.	Obodai (yellow card) 20'	Report	vanSchaik (yellow card) 23'; Prince (yellow card) 54'; Lewis (yellow card) 67'	Stadium: Highmark Stadium; Attendance: 2,253; Referee: Charles Murphy

April 27, 2014 6	Rochester Rhinos	1–0	Charleston Battery	Rochester, New York
4:05 p.m.	Banks 19'	Report	Ferguson (yellow card) 86'	Stadium: Sahlen's Stadium; Attendance: 6,358; Referee: David Mon

May 2, 2014 7	Harrisburg City Islanders	0–4	Charleston Battery	Harrisburg, Pennsylvania
7:00 p.m.	Langley (yellow card) 15'; Ekra (yellow card) 28'; White (red card) 66'	Report	Sanyang (yellow card) 20'; Salgado 25'; Prince 41'; Lewis 65'; Diouf (yellow card) 66' (goal) 90'	Stadium: Skyline Sports Complex; Attendance: 1,446; Referee: Jose Carlos Rivero

May 4, 2014 8	Dayton Dutch Lions	0–2	Charleston Battery	Beavercreek, Ohio
7:00 p.m.		Report	Cordoves 37'; Salgado 87'	Stadium: Beavercreek High School Stadium; Attendance: 213; Referee: Alan Kelly

May 10, 2014 9	Charleston Battery	0–1	Wilmington Hammerheads	Charleston, South Carolina
7:30 p.m.	Wilson (yellow card) 19' vanSchaik (yellow card) 74'; Griffith (yellow card) 89'	Report	Nicholson 9'; Aparicio (yellow card) 33' (red card) 60'; Campbell (yellow card) 60'; Parratt (yellow card) 88'; Arnoux (yellow card) 89'	Stadium: Blackbaud Stadium; Attendance: 4,487; Referee: Juan Colazo

May 17, 2014 10	Wilmington Hammerheads	1–0	Charleston Battery	Wilmington, North Carolina
7:30 p.m.	Musa (yellow card) 38'; Hamilton 65'; Roberts (red card) 69'	Report	Ferguson (red card) 69'	Stadium: Legion Stadium; Attendance: 2,315; Referee: Larry Stroud

May 24, 2014 11	Charleston Battery	1–0	Pittsburgh Riverhounds	Charleston, South Carolina
7:30 p.m.	Sanyang 40'; Kelly (yellow card) 44' (red card) 51'	Report	Marshall (yellow card) 80'	Stadium: Blackbaud Stadium; Attendance: 5,415; Referee: Patrick O'Brian

May 31, 2014 12	Orlando City	2–0	Charleston Battery	Lake Buena Vista, Florida
7:30 p.m.	Hertzog 42'; Ceren (yellow card) 52'; Rusin (yellow card) 61'; Molino 76'	Report	Prince (yellow card) 51'; Sanyang (yellow card) 78'	Stadium: ESPN Wide World of Sports; Attendance: 4,987; Referee: Marcos DeOliveira

June 14, 2014 13	Charleston Battery	3–0	LA Galaxy II	Charleston, South Carolina
7:30 p.m.	Falvey 25'; Kelly 50'; Cordovés 85'	Report		Stadium: Blackbaud Stadium; Attendance: 3,377; Referee: Richonne Clark

June 21, 2014 14	Charlotte Eagles	3–1	Charleston Battery	Charlotte, North Carolina
7:00 p.m.	Guzman 2' (yellow card) 70'; Sekyere 28'; Newman (yellow card) 61'; Herrera 65' (yellow card) 90'; Yates (yellow card) 81'	Summary	Falvey (yellow card) 27'; Chang 45'	Stadium: Dickson Field; Attendance: 698; Referee: Chris Spivey

June 27, 2014 15	Charleston Battery	Postponed	Richmond Kickers	Charleston, South Carolina
7:30 p.m.		Report		Stadium: Blackbaud Stadium
Note: Postponed due to persistent lightning. Rescheduled for July 22.

July 5, 2014 16	Harrisburg City Islanders	4–1	Charleston Battery	Harrisburg, Pennsylvania
6:00 p.m.	McLaughlin 7'; Barril 11'; Langley 21' (yellow card) 55'; Hardware (yellow card) 45'; Bahner 48'; Noble (yellow card) 51'; Pedro Ribeiro (yellow card) 79'	Report	Kelly (yellow card) 39'; Sanyang (yellow card) 49' vanSchaik (yellow card) 52' (goal) 86'; Lewis (red card) 81'	Stadium: Skyline Sports Complex; Attendance: 2,033; Referee: Jeff Forward

July 12, 2014 17	Charleston Battery	0–0	Charlotte Eagles	Charleston, South Carolina
7:30 p.m.	Griffith (yellow card) 17'; Prince (yellow card) 45'	Report	Duckett (yellow card) 27'	Stadium: Blackbaud Stadium; Attendance: 4,698; Referee: David Mon

July 19, 2014 18	Richmond Kickers	4–0	Charleston Battery	Richmond, Virginia
7:00 p.m.	Shanosky 45'; Davis IV 45+'; Yeisley 50'; Delicâte 68'; Lee (yellow card) 90'	Report	Prince (yellow card) 24'; Kelly (yellow card) 90'	Stadium: City Stadium; Attendance: 2,901; Referee: Matthew Franz

July 22, 2014 15	Charleston Battery	1–1	Richmond Kickers	Charleston, South Carolina
7:30 p.m.	Cuevas 7' (pen.)	Report	Yeisley 14'	Stadium: Blackbaud Stadium; Attendance: 2,214; Referee: Mark A Sauro

July 26, 2014 19	Charleston Battery	2–0	Arizona United SC	Charleston, South Carolina
7:30 p.m.	Kelly 25' 33'; Falvey (yellow card) 74'; Chang (yellow card) 87'	Report	Woodberry (yellow card) 54'; Garza (yellow card) 74'; Long Tan (yellow card) 74'; Stisser (yellow card) 89'	Stadium: Blackbaud Stadium; Attendance: 4,464; Referee: (United States) Chris Spivey

August 1, 2014 20	Rochester Rhinos	0–0	Charleston Battery	Rochester, New York
7:35 p.m.	Obasi (yellow card) 57'	Report	Kelly (yellow card) 68'	Stadium: Sahlen's Stadium; Attendance: 4,445; Referee: (United States) Jeff Forward

August 3, 2014 21	Montreal Impact Reserves	0–1	Charleston Battery	Montréal, Quebec
7:30 p.m.	Gagnon-Laparé (yellow card) 11'	Report	Falvey 20'; Cuevas (yellow card) 26'	Stadium: CS Claude-Robillard; Attendance: 100

August 8, 2014 22	Charleston Battery	2–2	Dayton Dutch Lions	Charleston, South Carolina
7:30 p.m.	Kelly 5'; Mena 23'; Diouf (yellow card) 33' vanSchaik (yellow card) 64'	Report	Granger 11'; Hertsenberg (yellow card) 80'; Clemens 85'	Stadium: Blackbaud Stadium; Attendance: 3,081; Referee: (United States) David Erbacher

August 13, 2014 23	Charleston Battery	3–2	Orange County Blues FC	Charleston, South Carolina
7:30 p.m.	Kelly 18' 65'; Cuevas 36'; Prince (yellow card) 90'; Falvey (yellow card) 90'	Report	Martinez 44'; Kim Seung-ju 75'	Stadium: Blackbaud Stadium; Attendance: 2,988; Referee: (United States) Howard Ash

August 15, 2014 24	Charleston Battery	2–1	Rochester Rhinos	Charleston, South Carolina
7:30 p.m.	Chang 26'; Cuevas 41'	Report	Rosenlund (yellow card) 40'; Banks 41'	Stadium: Blackbaud Stadium; Attendance: 4,011; Referee: (United States) Cedric Adams

August 24, 2014 25	Oklahoma City Energy FC	0–2	Charleston Battery	Oklahoma City, Oklahoma
8:00 p.m.		Report	Sanyang (yellow card) 23' (yellow-red card) (goal) 79'; Kelly (yellow card) 60'; Cordovés 90'	Stadium: Pribil Stadium; Attendance: 4,722; Referee: (United States) Charles Farr

August 27, 2014 26	Sacramento Republic FC	3–1	Charleston Battery	Sacramento, California
10:30 p.m.	López 12' 25'; Evans 82'	Report	Falvey 16'	Stadium: Hughes Stadium; Attendance: 8,000; Referee: (United States) Michael Zapata

August 30, 2014 27	Charleston Battery	4–0	Pittsburgh Riverhounds	Charleston, South Carolina
7:30 p.m.	Kelly 38' 47' 54'; Cooper (yellow card) 45'; Prince 67'	Report	Arena (yellow card) 2'; Vincent (yellow card) 8'	Stadium: Blackbaud Stadium; Attendance: 4,161; Referee: (United States) Patrick O'Brian

September 5, 2014 28	Charleston Battery	2–1	Harrisburg City Islanders	Charleston, South Carolina
7:30 p.m.	Cordovés 45'; Cuevas (yellow card) 45'; Diouf 56'; Prince (yellow card) 58'	Report	Marquez (yellow card) 28'; Pettis 89'; Barril (yellow card) 89'; Wheeler (yellow card) 90'	Stadium: Blackbaud Stadium; Attendance: 3,919; Referee: (United States) Agostino Minasola

=== Standings ===
Pos	Team	Pld	W	T	L	GF	GA	GD	Pts	Qualification
3	LA Galaxy II (A)	28	15	6	7	54	38	+16	51	Playoffs
4	Richmond Kickers (A)	28	13	12	3	53	28	+25	51	Playoffs
5	Charleston Battery (A)	28	11	8	9	36	31	+5	41	Playoffs
6	Rochester Rhinos (A)	28	10	8	10	29	25	+4	38	Playoffs
7	Wilmington Hammerheads (A)	28	9	11	8	35	33	+2	38	Playoffs

Source: USL Pro official standings
Rules for classification: 1) points; 2) goal difference; 3) number of goals scored.
(A) Advances to USL Pro Playoffs

=== 2014 U.S. Open Cup Results ===
May 14, 2014 Second Round	Charleston Battery	4–0	Panama City Beach Pirates	Charleston, South Carolina
7:30pm EDT	Cordovés; Chang	Report		Stadium: Blackbaud Stadium; Attendance: 1,801

May 28, 2014 Third Round	Charleston Battery	2–2 (a.e.t.) (11–12 p)	Orlando City U-23	Charleston, South Carolina
7:30pm EDT	Kelly 63' 68' (pen.); Portillo (yellow card) 69'; Falvey (yellow card) 86'	Report	Williams 26' (yellow card) 81'; Brody 45'; Hernandez (yellow card) 50'; Russell (yellow card) 51'	Stadium: Blackbaud Stadium; Attendance: 1,428; Referee: Howard Ashe
