= 2017 Charleston Battery season =

Charleston Battery
2017 season
- President: Andrew Bell
- Head coach: Michael Anhaeuser
- Stadium: MUSC Health Stadium
- USL: Conference: 2nd Overall: 3rd
- USL Playoffs: First round
- U.S. Open Cup: Fourth round
- Top goalscorer: Romario Williams (10)
- Highest home attendance: 6,563 (4/29 vs. OTT)
- Lowest home attendance: 2,015 (5/13 vs. STL)
- Average home league attendance: 3,154
- Biggest win: CHS 5–0 ROC (4/15); CHS 6–1 TOR (6/24)
- Biggest defeat: TBR 2–0 CHS (7/22); RIC 3–1 CHS (8/26)
Home colors	Away colors

The 2017 Charleston Battery season was the club's 25th year of existence, their 14th season in the second tier of the United States Soccer Pyramid, and their first in the second tier since 2009. It was their seventh season in the United Soccer League as part of the Eastern Conference.

The Battery finished the season 3rd overall in the league, and 2nd in the East. They lost in the first round of the 2017 USL Playoffs.

== Background ==
The Battery are coming off a season where they finished the USL with 13–9–8 record, good enough to finish sixth in the Eastern Conference and 10th in the USL. They earned a berth into the 2016 USL Playoffs as the number six seed in the Eastern Bracket. There, they beat FC Cincinnati in the first round, 2–1, before losing to Louisville City FC in the Conference Semifinals, 1–0. The Battery reached the third round of the 2016 U.S. Open Cup after beating The Villages SC, 3–0 on a forfeit. The original second round proper fixture was tied 2–2 after extra time, and the Villages won 4–2 in penalties. However, the Battery protested their use of a player cup-tied to Boca Raton FC. The appeal was approved, and the Battery reached the third round where they lost in extra-time to Jacksonville Armada FC in the third round.

== Squad ==
No.	Name	Nationality	Position	Date of birth (age)	Previous club
Goalkeepers
0	Joe Kuzminsky	(United States)	GK	January 24, 1994 (aged 23)	(United States) UAB Blazers
1	Alexandros Tabakis	(Greece)	GK	December 8, 1992 (aged 24)	(United States) Atlanta United FC
23	Odisnel Cooper	(Cuba)	GK	March 31, 1992 (aged 25)	(Cuba) FC Camagüey
Defenders
3	Forrest Lasso	(United States)	CB	May 11, 1993 (aged 24)	(United States) Wofford Terriers
4	Taylor Mueller	(United States)	CB	September 20, 1988 (aged 29)	(United States) Washington Crossfire
6	Skylar Thomas	(Canada)	RB	July 27, 1993 (aged 24)	(Canada) Toronto FC II
7	O'Brian Woodbine	(Jamaica)	LB	January 11, 1988 (aged 29)	(Canada) Ottawa Fury FC
11	Quinton Griffith	(Antigua and Barbuda)	RB	February 22, 1992 (aged 25)	(Antigua and Barbuda) Antigua Barracuda FC
15	Mikey Ambrose	(United States)	CB	December 5, 1993 (aged 23)	(United States) Atlanta United FC
Midfielders
8	Neveal Hackshaw	(Trinidad and Tobago)	CM	September 21, 1995 (aged 22)	(Trinidad and Tobago) North East Stars
10	Ataullah Guerra	(Trinidad and Tobago)	AM	November 14, 1987 (aged 29)	(Trinidad and Tobago) Central
19	Dante Marini	(United States)	LM	July 21, 1992 (aged 25)	(United States) Reading United
20	Justin Portillo	(United States)	CM	September 9, 1992 (aged 25)	(United States) Coastal Carolina Chanticleers
21	Maikel Chang	(Cuba)	AM	April 18, 1991 (aged 26)	(Cuba) FC La Habana
22	Brian Anunga	(Cameroon)	RM	August 6, 1996 (aged 21)	(United States) Carolina Dynamo
24	Nico Rittmeyer	(United States)	CM	October 13, 1993 (aged 24)	(United States) Charleston Cougars
25	Kotaro Higashi	(Japan)	LM	January 21, 1989 (aged 28)	(Australia) Bonnyrigg White Eagles
28	Ryan Arambula	(United States)	RM	December 19, 1993 (aged 23)	(United States) South Carolina Gamecocks
Forwards
9	Romario Williams	(Jamaica)	ST	August 15, 1994 (aged 23)	(United States) Atlanta United FC
16	Heviel Cordovés	(Cuba)	ST	November 10, 1989 (aged 27)	(Cuba) FC La Habana
17	Ricky Garbanzo	(Costa Rica)	ST	August 26, 1992 (aged 25)	(United States) Coastal Carolina Chanticleers
30	Jeffrey Otoo	(Ghana)	ST	January 21, 1998 (aged 19)	(United States) Atlanta United FC

On loan from MLS affiliate Atlanta United FC.
Player's age during the 2017 season.

== Non-competitive ==
=== Carolina Challenge Cup ===
February 18 1	Charleston Battery	1–1	Seattle Sounders FC	Charleston, South Carolina
5:00 PM EDT	Vázquez (yellow card) 78'; Higashi 90+2'	Report	Mueller 32' (o.g.); Delem (yellow card) 37'; Jones (yellow card) 40'	Stadium: MUSC Health Stadium

February 22 2	Charleston Battery	1–1	Columbus Crew SC	Charleston, South Carolina
5:00 PM EST	Marini (yellow card) 12'; Chang (yellow card) 22'; Williams (yellow card) 24'; Lasso 25'; Mueller (yellow card) 61'	Report	Jonathan (yellow card) 8'; Afful (yellow card) 23'; Næss 63' (o.g.); Abu (yellow card) 79'; Abubakar (yellow card) 83'	Stadium: MUSC Health Stadium

February 25 3	Charleston Battery	1–2	Atlanta United FC	Charleston, South Carolina
7:00 PM EST	Williams 45'	Report	Asad 4'; Villalba 90'	Stadium: MUSC Health Stadium

== Competitive ==
=== USL ===
==== Table ====
Pos	Team	Pld	W	D	L	GF	GA	GD	Pts	Qualification
1	Louisville City FC (C)	32	18	8	6	58	31	+27	62	Conference Playoffs
2	Charleston Battery	32	15	9	8	53	33	+20	54	Conference Playoffs
3	Tampa Bay Rowdies	32	14	11	7	50	35	+15	53	Conference Playoffs
4	Rochester Rhinos	32	14	11	7	36	28	+8	53	Conference Playoffs
5	Charlotte Independence	32	13	9	10	52	40	+12	48	Conference Playoffs

Source: 2017 USL standings
Rules for classification: 1) total wins; 2) total goal differential; 3) total goals scored; 4) points earned against top four Conference finishers; 5) disciplinary points; 6) coin toss or drawing of lots
(C) Champions

==== Results ====
March 25 1	Charleston Battery	2–1	FC Cincinnati	Charleston, South Carolina
EST	Lasso (yellow card) 8' (goal) 38'; Portillo 71' (pen.)	Report	Fall 59'	Stadium: MUSC Health Stadium; Attendance: 2,247; Referee: Geoff Gamble

April 1 2	Charlotte Independence	0–2	Charleston Battery	Matthews, North Carolina
6:00 PM EST	Alajarín (yellow card) 42'; Duckett (yellow card) 49'; Ross (yellow card) 68'	Report	Lasso (yellow card) 32' (goal) 77'; Williams 70'	Stadium: Mecklenburg County Sportsplex; Attendance: 2,048; Referee: Kevin Broadley

April 8 3	Charleston Battery	1–2	Pittsburgh Riverhounds	Charleston, South Carolina
7:00 PM EST	Guerra 8'; Williams (yellow card) 44'; Portillo (yellow card) 85'	Report	Hollingsworth 59'; Obinwa (yellow card) 73'; Hertzog 90+1'	Stadium: MUSC Health Stadium; Attendance: 2,425; Referee: Aleksandar Zhelyazkov

April 15 4	Charleston Battery	5–0	Rochester Rhinos	Charleston, South Carolina
7:00 PM EST	Williams 15', 25', 26'; Guerra 31'; Chang 81'; Thomas (yellow card) 82'; Anunga (yellow card) 88'; Mueller (yellow card) 89'	Report	Fall (yellow card) 56'; James (yellow card) 59'	Stadium: MUSC Health Stadium; Attendance: 2,421; Referee: Howard Ashe

April 22 5	Tampa Bay Rowdies	2–3	Charleston Battery	St. Petersburg, Florida
7:30 PM EST	Cole 34'; Hristov 62'; Paterson (yellow card) 90'	Report	Williams (yellow card) 38'; Lasso (yellow card) 40' (goal) 61'; Chang 45+1'; Woodbine (yellow card) 62'; Anunga 89'	Stadium: Al Lang Stadium; Attendance: 5,016; Referee: Jonathan Weiner

April 29 6	Charleston Battery	2–2	Ottawa Fury FC	Charleston, South Carolina
EST	Williams 41', 84' (yellow card) 73'	Report	Williams 22'; Del Campo 56'	Stadium: MUSC Health Stadium; Attendance: 6,563; Referee: Chris Spivey

May 6 7	Charleston Battery	1–0	Bethlehem Steel FC	Charleston, South Carolina
7:00 PM EST	Guerra 17'; Hackshaw (yellow card) 22'; Cordoves (yellow card) 69'	Report	Trusty (yellow card) 55'	Stadium: MUSC Health Stadium; Attendance: 2,820; Referee: Kevin Broadley

May 13 8	Charleston Battery	1–0	Saint Louis FC	Charleston, South Carolina
7:00 PM EST	Lasso 62'; Anunga (yellow card) 68'	Report	Bjurman (yellow card) 38'; Stojkov (yellow card) 90+3'	Stadium: MUSC Health Stadium; Attendance: 2,015; Referee: Henrik Karlsson

May 20 9	Harrisburg City Islanders	2–2	Charleston Battery	Harrisburg, Pennsylvania
7:00 PM EST	Olabiyi 23'; Dabo (yellow card) 45'; Nishanian (yellow card) 75'; Ribeiro (yellow card) 82'; Mendoza 90+5'	Report	Anunga (yellow card) 33' (yellow-red card) 53'; Guerra (yellow card) 38' (goal) 68'; Lasso (yellow card) 41'; Mueller (yellow card) 56'; Williams 69'	Stadium: FNB Field; Attendance: 2,829; Referee: Luis Guardia

May 25 10	Bethlehem Steel FC	0–1	Charleston Battery	Bethlehem, Pennsylvania
11:00 AM EST	Monge (yellow card) 77'; Burke (yellow card) 88'	Report	Williams 32'	Stadium: Goodman Stadium; Attendance: 2,971; Referee: Jonathan Weiner

May 28 11	New York Red Bulls II	2–1	Charleston Battery	Montclair, New Jersey
2:00 PM EST	Tinari (yellow card) 22'; Meara (yellow card) 42'; Ndam (yellow card) 44'; Flemmings 54'; Abidor (yellow card) 65'; Etienne 75'; Bezecourt (yellow card) 79'	Report	Portillo 45'; Garbanzo (yellow card) 65'	Stadium: MSU Soccer Park at Pittser Field; Attendance: 505; Referee: Bardhyl Pashaj

June 3 12	Charleston Battery	4–4	Louisville City FC	Charleston, South Carolina
7:00 PM EST	Lasso (yellow card) 23'; Williams 11', 32' (yellow card) 77'; Chang 48'; Anunga (yellow card) 53'; Garbanzo 73'; Marini (yellow card) 88'	Report	Jimenez 45+1'; Davis IV 60'; Smith (yellow card) 61'; Ownby 79'; Lasso 82' (o.g.); Ballard 90'	Stadium: MUSC Health Stadium; Attendance: 3,710; Referee: Jon Freemon

June 10 13	Charleston Battery	1–0	Richmond Kickers	Charleston, South Carolina
7:00 PM EST	Portillo 26' (pen.); Woodbine (yellow card) 61'; Mueller (yellow card) 82'	Report	Shanosky (yellow card) 12'	Stadium: MUSC Health Stadium; Attendance: 2,526; Referee: (United States) Gustavo Solorio

June 17 14	FC Cincinnati	2–2	Charleston Battery	Cincinnati, Ohio
7:00 PM EST	Fall 4'; König (yellow card) 45+2'; Wiedeman 80'	Report	Williams (yellow card) 50' (goal) 63'; Lasso 72'	Stadium: Nippert Stadium; Attendance: 21,074; Referee: (United States) Eric Tattersall

June 24 15	Charleston Battery	6–1	Toronto FC II	Charleston, South Carolina
7:00 PM EST	Williams 31' 50'; Lasso 42'; Marini 57' 71'; Portillo 90+2'	Report	Fraser (yellow card) 56'; Camargo 65'	Stadium: MUSC Health Stadium; Attendance: 4,571; Referee: (United States) Kevin Broadley

July 1 16	Charleston Battery	2–0	Tampa Bay Rowdies	Charleston, South Carolina
7:00 PM EST	Guerra (yellow card) 8'; Griffith (yellow card) 50'; Williams 70'; Cordovés 81'	Report	Lowe (yellow card) 55'; Boden (yellow card) 62'; Morrell (yellow card) 69'	Stadium: MUSC Health Stadium; Attendance: 2,967; Referee: (United States) Matthew Franz

July 9 17	Charleston Battery	1–1	Louisville City FC	Charleston, South Carolina
7:00 PM EST	Portillo 23' (pen.); Higashi (yellow card) 52'; Woodbine (yellow card) 69'; Anunga (yellow card) 86'	Report	Smith (yellow card) 23'; Ilić 27'; Morad (yellow card) 71'; Craig (yellow card) 85'	Stadium: MUSC Health Stadium; Attendance: 3,701; Referee: (United States) Rubiel Vazquez

July 15 18	Saint Louis FC	1–0	Charleston Battery	St. Louis, Missouri
20:30 PM EST	Plewa (yellow card) 40'; Sheldon (yellow card) 45+1'; Guzmán 72'; David (yellow card) 90'	Report	Cordovés (yellow card) 9'; Higashi (yellow card) 53'; Griffith (yellow card) 89'	Stadium: Toyota Stadium; Attendance: 5,243; Referee: (United States) Mark Kadlecik

July 22 19	Tampa Bay Rowdies	2–0	Charleston Battery	St. Petersburg, Florida
19:30 EDT (UTC−4)	Mkandawire (yellow card) 25'; Cole 40'; Paterson 69'	Report		Stadium: Al Lang Stadium; Attendance: 5,619; Referee: Daniel Gutierrez

July 26 20	Pittsburgh Riverhounds	2–2	Charleston Battery	Pittsburgh, Pennsylvania
20:00 PM EST	Victor Souto 21'; Hertzog 62'	Report	Miles Robinson 11'; Mueller (yellow card) 56'; Chang 84'; Thomas (yellow card) 90+1'	Stadium: Highmark Stadium; Attendance: 2,067; Referee: (United States) Charles Murphy

July 29 21	Charleston Battery	0–0	Orlando City B	Charleston, South Carolina
19:00 PM EST	Lasso (yellow card) 65'; Kunga (yellow card) 84'; Portillo (yellow card) 90+1'	Report	Hines (yellow card) 5'; Clowes (yellow card) 90'; Ellis-Hayden (yellow card) 90+1'	Stadium: MUSC Health Stadium; Attendance: 2,853; Referee: (United States) Gustavo Solorio

August 5 22	Toronto FC II	1–0	Charleston Battery	Vaughan, Ontario
3:30 PM EST	Hundal 52'; Dunn (yellow card) 90+2'	Report	Garbanzo (yellow card) 16'	Stadium: Ontario Soccer Centre; Attendance: 1,145; Referee: Chris Grabas

August 12 23	Charleston Battery	1–1	New York Red Bulls II	Charleston, South Carolina
7:00PM EST	Woodbine (yellow card) 44', (yellow card) 86' (red card); Williams 45'; Anunga (yellow card) 51'; Mueller (yellow card) 59'; Portillo (yellow card) 79'	Report	Kutler (yellow card) 40'; Flemmings (yellow card) 52'; Bonomo 72'	Stadium: MUSC Health Stadium; Attendance: 3,233; Referee: Christopher Spivey

August 19 24	Rochester Rhinos	0–1	Charleston Battery	Rochester, New York
18:05 PM EST	Madison (yellow card) 45+1'	Report	Hackshaw (yellow card) 21'; Williams (yellow card) 25'; Portillo 83'; Cooper (yellow card) 90+2'	Stadium: Capelli Sport Stadium; Attendance: 2,319; Referee: Bardhyl Pashaj

August 26 25	Richmond Kickers	3–1	Charleston Battery	Richmond, Virginia
19:00 EDT	Jane 17'; Oliver 36' (yellow card) 32'; Imura 90+2'; Eskay (yellow card) 89'	Report	Cordovés 2'; Thomas (yellow card) 38' van Schaik (yellow card) 53'	Stadium: City Stadium; Attendance: Nickrod Fateh; Referee: 3,527
Note: yes

September 2 26	Louisville City FC	1–0	Charleston Battery	Louisville, Kentucky
5:00PM	Abend 78'	Report	Hackshaw (yellow card) 76'; Mueller (yellow card) 79'; Portillo (yellow card) 86'	Stadium: Louisville Slugger Field; Attendance: 7,612; Referee: Malik Badawi

September 16 27	Charleston Battery	1–0	Richmond Kickers	Charleston, South Carolina
19:00 EDT	Cordovés 84'; Lasso (yellow card) 34'; Williams (red card) 37'; Thomas (yellow card) 77'	Report	Eskay (yellow card) 65'	Stadium: MUSC Health Stadium; Attendance: 2,228; Referee: Kevin Broadley
Note: yes

September 20 28	Charleston Battery	3–0	Charlotte Independence	Charleston, South Carolina
6:00 P.M. EDT	Hackshaw (yellow card) 6'; Cordoves 13', 80'; Lasso (yellow card) 18'; Garbanzo 73'	Report	Waechter (yellow card) 21'; Ekra (yellow card) 55'	Stadium: MUSC Health Stadium; Attendance: 2,020; Referee: Dallas Rosier

September 23 29	Orlando City B	2–1	Charleston Battery	Orlando, Florida
	da Silva 31'; Clowes (yellow card) 50'; Carroll (yellow card) 70'; Neal 87'	Report	Griffith (yellow card) 60'; Cordovés 81'	Stadium: Orlando City Stadium; Attendance: 1,011; Referee: Elvis Osmanovic

October 1 30	Ottawa Fury FC	1–1	Charleston Battery	Ottawa, Ontario
14:00 EDT (UTC-04:00)	Dos Santos 16'; Dixon (yellow card) 35'; DePuy (yellow card) 46'	Report	Hackshaw (yellow card) 28'; Lasso (yellow card) 40' (yellow-red card) 59'; Cordovés 85'	Stadium: TD Place Stadium; Attendance: 4,587; Referee: Chris Grabas

October 7 31	Charleston Battery	4–0	Harrisburg City Islanders	Charleston, South Carolina
19:00 EDT	Cordoves 15', 58' van Schaik (yellow card) 19'; Guerra 28'; Griffith 89' (yellow card) 89'	Report; Box Score	Olabiyi (yellow card) 36'; Brent (yellow card) 82'	Stadium: MUSC Health Stadium; Attendance: 4,170; Referee: David Erbacher

October 14 32	Charlotte Independence	0–1	Charleston Battery	Matthews, North Carolina
6:00 P.M. EDT		Report	Guerra 35'; Griffith (yellow card) 42'; Mueller (yellow card) 72'; Portillo (yellow card) 83'; Rittmeyer (yellow card) 90+3'	Stadium: Sportsplex at Matthews; Attendance: 1,864; Referee: Daniel Gutierrez

=== U.S. Open Cup ===
May 17 Second round	Atlanta Silverbacks (Georgia (U.S. state))	1–2	(South Carolina) Charleston Battery	Atlanta, Georgia
3:30 PM EDT	Tacchi (yellow card) 24'; Garcia (yellow card) 45'; Harlley 73'	Report	Lasso 20'; Otoo 44'; Thomas (yellow card) 79'	Stadium: Atlanta Silverbacks Park

May 31 Third round	Jacksonville Armada (Florida)	0–1	(South Carolina) Charleston Battery	Jacksonville, Florida
7:00 PM EDT	Rebellón (yellow card) 90+3'	Report	Beckie 25' (o.g.); Lasso (yellow card) 56'; Anunga (yellow card) 58'; Hackshaw (yellow card) 90+4'	Stadium: Southern Oak Stadium; Attendance: 831; Referee: Esteban Rosano

June 14 Fourth round	Atlanta United FC (Georgia (U.S. state))	3–2	(South Carolina) Charleston Battery	Kennesaw, Georgia
7:00 PM EDT	Kratz 30'; Larentowicz (yellow card) 34'; Martínez 48'; Walkes (yellow card) 59'; Vazquez 72'	Report	Lasso 3'; Marini 31'; Mueller (yellow card) 89'	Stadium: Fifth Third Bank Stadium; Attendance: 9,458; Referee: (United States) Guido Gonzalez
