= 2019 Real Monarchs season =

Real Monarchs
2019 season
- Head coach: Martín Vásquez
- Stadium: Zions Bank Stadium; Herriman, Utah
- USL: 4th, Western Conference
- USL Playoffs: Champions
- Four Corners Cup: Winner
- Highest home attendance: 4,521 (November 9 vs. El Paso)
- Lowest home attendance: 1,036 (March 23 vs. LA Galaxy II)
- Average home league attendance: 1,983
- Biggest win: 5–0 (March 23 vs. LA Galaxy II) (July 12 vs. Tacoma Defiance)
- Biggest defeat: 1–5 (April 13 vs. New Mexico United)

The 2019 Real Monarchs season was the fifth season for Real Monarchs in the United Soccer League Championship, the second-tier professional soccer league in the United States and Canada.

== Club ==
As of February 20, 2019

No.	Position	Player	Nation
40	MF	USA	James Moberg
41	FW	CMR	Lionel Etoundi
42	FW	HON	Douglas Martínez
43	MF	USA	Justin Portillo
44	MF	CUB	Maikel Chang
45	MF	USA	Andrew Brody
46	MF	USA	Damian German
47	FW	WAL	Josh Heard
48	MF	SCO	Jack Blake
49	MF	PAN	Ricardo Ávila (on loan from Universitario)
52	DF	USA	Kalen Ryden
53	DF	TTO	Noah Powder
55	MF	CAN	Masta Kacher
56	DF	POL	Konrad Plewa
60	DF	KEN	Joseph Okumu
61	GK	USA	Evan Finney

Signed to first team contract with Real Salt Lake.
Real Salt Lake Academy player.

== Competitions ==
=== Exhibitions ===
February 8 Preseason	RSL Academy	—	Real Monarchs	Utah
9:00 AM
Note: Results not published.

February 15 Wasatch Winter Cup	Real Monarchs	0–4	Reno 1868 FC	Herriman, Utah
3:00 PM		Report	Musovski 4', 27', 51' (pen.), 57'	Stadium: Zions Bank Training Center

February 18 Preseason	Real Monarchs	4–0	Utah Valley Wolverines	Herriman, Utah
3:00 PM	Chang 10'; Blake 13'; Etoundi 36'; Bailey 72'	Report		Stadium: Zions Bank Training Center

February 21 Wasatch Winter Cup	Real Monarchs	2–2	Colorado Springs Switchbacks FC	Herriman, Utah
11:30 AM	Etoundi 33'; Brody 71'	Report	Argueta 17'; Seth 53'	Stadium: Zions Bank Training Center

March 2 Preseason	LA Galaxy II	v	Real Monarchs	Carson, California
				Stadium: Dignity Health Sports Park

=== USL Championship ===
==== Standings ====
Pos	Team	Pld	W	D	L	GF	GA	GD	Pts	Qualification
2	Reno 1868 FC	34	18	6	10	72	51	+21	60	Conference Quarterfinals
3	Fresno FC	34	16	9	9	58	44	+14	57	Conference Quarterfinals
4	Real Monarchs (C)	34	16	8	10	71	53	+18	56	Conference Quarterfinals
5	Orange County SC	34	15	9	10	54	43	+11	54	Conference Quarterfinals
6	El Paso Locomotive FC	34	13	11	10	42	36	+6	50	Conference Quarterfinals

Source: USL Championship Standings
Rules for classification: 1) total wins; 2) total goal differential; 3) total goals scored; 4) points earned against top four Conference finishers; 5) disciplinary points; 6) coin toss or drawing of lots
(C) Champions

==== Match results ====
On December 19, 2018, the USL announced that their 2019 season schedule.

Win Draw Loss Upcoming fixture

Unless otherwise noted, all times in MDT (UTC-06)

March 9 1	Sacramento Republic FC	1–1	Real Monarchs	Sacramento, California
8:30 PM	Iwasa (yellow card) 11'; Chantzopoulos 81'	Report	Chang (yellow card) 25'; Blake 35' (pen.); Ávila (yellow card) 80'; Kacher (yellow card) 90+4'	Stadium: Papa Murphy's Park; Attendance: 10,086; Referee: Farhad Dadkho

March 16 2	Real Monarchs	0–0	El Paso Locomotive FC	Herriman, Utah
1:00 PM	Ryden (red card) 32'; Martínez (yellow card) 73'; Blake (yellow card) 90+2'	Report		Stadium: Zions Bank Stadium; Attendance: 1,320; Referee: Lukasz Szpala

March 23 3	Real Monarchs	5–0	LA Galaxy II	Herriman, Utah
1:00 PM	Ávila 25'; Martínez (yellow card) 48'; Blake (yellow card) 56'; Chang 60', 72'; Ochoa (yellow card) 63'; Etoundi 79'; Jasso 86'	Report	Cuello (yellow card) 42'; Traore (red card) 70'	Stadium: Zions Bank Stadium; Attendance: 1,036; Referee: Elijio Arreguin

March 30 4	Las Vegas Lights FC	1–0	Real Monarchs	Las Vegas, Nevada
8:30 PM	Parra (yellow card) 45+3'; Scaglia (yellow card) 45+3'; Harlley 49'; Torre (yellow card) 90+1'	Report	Blake (yellow card) 37'; Martínez (yellow card) 56'; Powder (yellow card) 58'; Moberg (yellow card) 74'; Etoundi (yellow card) 90+1'	Stadium: Cashman Field; Attendance: 9,102; Referee: Ismir Pekmic

April 6 5	Real Monarchs	3–1	Reno 1868 FC	Herriman, Utah
1:00 PM	Chang 6'; Plata 15'; Heard (yellow card) 22'; Martínez (yellow card) 36'; Blake 48'	Report	Janjigian (yellow card) 45+2'; Apodaca 81'; Seymore (yellow card) 83'	Stadium: Zions Bank Stadium; Attendance: 2,560; Referee: Fotis Bazakos

April 13 6	New Mexico United	5–1	Real Monarchs	Albuquerque, New Mexico
7:30 PM	Moar 24', 28', 40'; Frater 45+2'; Suggs (yellow card) 47'; Wehan 79'; Muhammad (yellow card) 90'	Report	Blake 16'; Heard (yellow card) 47'	Stadium: Isotopes Park; Attendance: 12,327; Referee: Ricardo Robledo-Grajeda

April 20 7	Real Monarchs	3–2	San Antonio FC	Herriman, Utah
7:00 PM	Chang 48' (pen.); Blake 56' (pen.); Coffee 72'	Report	Gómez 6', 17'; Hernandez (yellow card) 47'; Lahoud (yellow card) 57'; Restrepo (yellow card) 58'	Stadium: Zions Bank Stadium; Attendance: 1,711; Referee: Malik Badawi

April 26 8	Austin Bold FC	3–2	Real Monarchs	Austin, Texas
7:30 PM	McFarlane 4'; Lima 11', 42', (yellow card) 45+5'; Isaac Promise (yellow card) 16'; Saramutin (red card) 45'	Report	Blake (yellow card) 3'; Schmitt 19'; Moberg (yellow card) 45+6'; Martínez 54'	Stadium: Bold Stadium; Attendance: 2,003; Referee: Elijio Arreguin

May 4 9	Real Monarchs	2–4	Fresno FC	Herriman, Utah
1:00 PM	Chang 17'; Heard 84'; Ávila (yellow card) 87'	Report	Chaney 27', 61'; Ryden 58' (o.g.); Johnson 90'	Stadium: Zions Bank Stadium; Attendance: 2,685; Referee: Dejan Susak

May 18 10	OKC Energy	1–1	Real Monarchs	Oklahoma City, Oklahoma
7:30 PM CDT	R.García (yellow card) 34'; Watson (yellow card) 36'; Cato 71'	Report	Schmitt 90+3'	Stadium: Taft Stadium; Attendance: 4,031; Referee: Greg Dopka

May 25 11	Real Monarchs	2–4	Phoenix Rising FC	Herriman, Utah
8:00 PM	Silva 10', (yellow card) 73'; Martínez 25'; Ávila (yellow card) 45'; Powder (yellow card) 67'	Report	Jahn 32'; Bakero 35'; Farrell (yellow card) 45'; Flemmings 60'; Dia (yellow card) 69'; Asante 81'	Stadium: Zions Bank Stadium; Attendance: 2,936; Referee: Farhad Dadkho

May 29 12	Portland Timbers 2	2–1	Real Monarchs	Portland, Oregon
7:00 PM	Asprilla 63', (yellow card) 90+2'; Jadama 70', (yellow card) 71'; Farfan (yellow card) 88'; Hanson (yellow card) 89'	Report	Kacher (yellow card) 28'; Martínez 37'; Plewa (yellow card) 59'; Heard (yellow card) 68'	Stadium: Providence Park; Attendance: 2,523; Referee: Jon Freemon

June 8 13	Real Monarchs	5–3	Rio Grande Valley FC Toros	Herriman, Utah
8:00 P.M.	Martínez 13', (yellow card) 62', (goal) 76'; Heard 21'; Chang 22'; Powder (yellow card) 48', (goal) 88'; Pierre (yellow card) 66'	Report	Salazar 60'; Enriquez (yellow card) 64'; Small 83', 90+3'	Stadium: Zions Bank Stadium; Attendance: 1,709; Referee: Elton García

June 22 14	Colorado Springs Switchbacks FC	1–2	Real Monarchs	Colorado Springs, Colorado
7:00 PM	Argueta (yellow card) 30'; Seth 55'; Rwatubyaye (yellow card) 61'; Jome (yellow card) 64'	Report	Heard (yellow card) 36'; Ávila (yellow card) 45+3'; Coffee 81'; Portillo 86'	Stadium: Weidner Field; Attendance: 4,506; Referee: Luis Guardia

June 29 15	Tulsa Roughnecks	1–3	Real Monarchs	Tulsa, Oklahoma
7:30 PM	da Costa 7'; Reyes (yellow card) 36'	Report	Kacher 17', (yellow card) 39'; Plewa 21'; Martinez 50'; Heard (yellow card) 63'; Mulholland (yellow card) 83'	Stadium: ONEOK Field; Attendance: 1,640; Referee: Matthew Corrigan

July 6 16	Real Monarchs	1–0	New Mexico United	Herriman, Utah
8:00 P.M.	Plewa (yellow card) 23'; Chang 59' (pen.); Ávila (yellow card) 73'; Ryden (yellow card) 90+7'	Report	Wehan (yellow card) 26'; Suggs (yellow card) 66'; Frater (yellow card) 66'; Guzmán (red card) 90+4'	Stadium: Zions Bank Stadium; Attendance: 2,159; Referee: Dejan Susak

July 12 17	Real Monarchs	5–0	Tacoma Defiance	Herriman, Utah
8:00 PM	Chang 8'; Martínez 36', (yellow card) 62', (goal) 67', 76'; Blake 83'	Report		Stadium: Zions Bank Stadium; Attendance: 1,919; Referee: Michael Radchuk

July 20 18	El Paso Locomotive FC	0–0	Real Monarchs	El Paso, Texas
7:30 PM		Report	Okumu (yellow card) 21'; Palma (yellow card) 42'; Portillo (yellow card) 48'	Stadium: Southwest University Park; Attendance: 6,012; Referee: Calin Radosav

July 27 19	San Antonio FC	3–1	Real Monarchs	San Antonio, Texas
6:30 p.m. CDT	Gómez 15'; López 31'; Forbes 83'	Report	Powder (yellow card) 28'; Etoundi (red card) 41'; Palma 45+6'; Portillo (yellow card) 51'; Blake (yellow card) 62'; Plewa (yellow card) 82'; Ryden (yellow card) 90'	Stadium: Toyota Field; Attendance: 6,550; Referee: Guido Gonzales Jr.

August 2 20	Real Monarchs	1–0	Colorado Springs Switchbacks FC	Herriman, Utah
8:00 PM	German 86', (yellow card) 86'	Report	Rodriguez (yellow card) 83'	Stadium: Zions Bank Stadium; Attendance: 1,817; Referee: David Barrie

August 10 21	Real Monarchs	4–1	Tulsa Roughnecks FC	Herriman, Utah
8:00 PM	German 17'; Blake 56'; Jasso (yellow card) 58'; Mulholland (yellow card) 68'; Ryden 77'; Chang 90'	Report	Uzo 90+1'	Stadium: Zions Bank Stadium; Attendance: 2,221; Referee: Elvis Osmanovic

August 16 22	Fresno FC	1–1	Real Monarchs	Fresno, California
7:30 PM	Chavez 38'; Daly (yellow card) 57'; Ellis-Hayden (yellow card) 78'	Report	Martínez 71'	Stadium: Chukchansi Park; Attendance: 3,842; Referee: Matthew Thompson

August 24 23	Orange County SC	3–1	Real Monarchs	Irvine, California
8:00 PM	Orozco 28'; Jones 38'; Quinn 52' van Ewijk (yellow card) 64'	Report	Jasso (yellow card) 51'; Ryden 61', (yellow card) 78'; Moberg (yellow card) 63'; Chang (yellow card) 74'; Holt (yellow card) 90+2'	Stadium: Championship Soccer Stadium; Attendance: 3,053; Referee: Farhad Dadkho

August 30 24	Real Monarchs	2–2	OKC Energy FC	Herriman, Utah
8:00 PM	Plewa 45+1', (yellow card) 51'; Martínez 78'	Report	Ibeagha (yellow card) 21'; R. Garcia 52'; Brown 80'; Jones (yellow card) 90'	Stadium: Zions Bank Stadium; Attendance: 2,091; Referee: Sergii Demianchuk

September 4 25	Real Monarchs	2–2	Las Vegas Lights FC	Herriman, Utah
8:00 PM	Blake 44' (pen.), 90+6'; Holt (yellow card) 52'; Martínez (yellow card) 90+6'	Report	Torres 9'; Sousa (yellow card) 15'; Robinson (yellow card) 31'; Tabortetaka 81'	Stadium: Zions Bank Stadium; Attendance: 1,471; Referee: Guido Gonzales Jr.

September 7 26	LA Galaxy II	3–1	Real Monarchs	Carson, California
19:00	Hernández 10', (yellow card) 34'; Hilliard-Arce 15'; Ontiveros (yellow card) 35'; Shultz (yellow card) 51'; Koreniuk (yellow card) 53'; Gutiérrez 68'	Report	Jasso (yellow card) 8'; Portillo (yellow card) 45', (goal) 88'; Powder (yellow card) 75'; Holt (yellow card) 87'	Stadium: Dignity Health Sports Park; Attendance: 1,082; Referee: Alejandro Mariscal

September 14 27	Real Monarchs	5–1	Portland Timbers 2	Herriman, Utah
8:00 PM	Martínez 22', 38', 66', 70'; Saucedo (yellow card) 80'; Coffee 83'; Moberg (yellow card) 87'	Report	Calixtro 24', (yellow card) 41'; Sierakowski (yellow card) 44'; Wharton (yellow card) 80'	Stadium: Zions Bank Stadium; Referee: Brad Jensen

September 17 28	Tacoma Defiance	1–4	Real Monarchs SLC	Tacoma, Washington
7:00 pm (PDT)	Ocampo-Chavez (yellow card) 4', (goal) 60'; Leyva (yellow card) 4' (yellow-red card) 64'; Rubio (yellow card) 44' (yellow-red card) 44'; Berkolds (yellow card) 90+2'	Report	Coffee 32'; Chang 55', 73' (pen.); Brown (yellow card) 58'; Plewa (yellow card) 63'; Blake (yellow card) 81'; Cálix 89'; Powder (yellow card) 90+2'	Stadium: Cheney Stadium; Attendance: 2,016; Referee: Mark Allatin

September 21 29	Rio Grande Valley FC Toros	3–1	Real Monarchs	Edinburg, Texas
7:30 P.M.	Enríquez 32' (pen.); Bird 56'; Lemoine (yellow card) 58'; Salazar 75'	Report	Blake (yellow card) 54'; Fertil-Pierre (yellow card) 72'; German 81'; Chang (yellow card) 82'; Powder (yellow card) 85'	Stadium: H-E-B Park; Attendance: 4,037; Referee: Ismir Pekmic

September 28 30	Reno 1868 FC	1–2	Real Monarchs	Reno, Nevada
7:00 pm (PDT)	Musovski 29'	Report	Powder 41'; Portillo (yellow card) 42'; Ryden (yellow card) 81'; Holt 83'	Stadium: Greater Nevada Field; Attendance: 5,007; Referee: Matthew Thompson

October 5	Real Monarchs	P–P	Austin Bold FC	Herriman, Utah
2:00 PM				Stadium: Zions Bank Stadium
Note: Match rescheduled due to the death of Isaac Promise.

October 9 31	Real Monarchs	2–0	Orange County SC	Herriman, Utah
8:00 PM	Schmitt (yellow card) 50'; Quinn 73' (o.g.); Chang 83'	Report	Seaton (yellow card) 50'	Stadium: Zions Bank Stadium; Attendance: 2,316; Referee: Elton García

October 12 32	Phoenix Rising FC	1–2	Real Monarchs	Scottsdale, Arizona
8:30 PM	Musa (yellow card) 54'; Asante (yellow card) 73'; Spencer 82'; Dia (yellow card) 86'; Whelan (red card) 89'	Report	Jasso (yellow card) 31'; Chang 74' (pen.); Plewa (red card) 89'; Coffee 90+3'	Stadium: Casino Arizona Field; Attendance: 6,863; Referee: Malik Badawi

October 16 33	Real Monarchs	2–2	Austin Bold FC	Herriman, Utah
8:00 PM	Vazquez 5'; Coffee 55'; Ryden (yellow card) 90+3'	Report	Twumasi 18'; McFarlane (yellow card) 23'; Rissi (yellow card) 44'; Soto (yellow card) 52'; Lima 57'; Kléber (red card) 86'	Stadium: Zions Bank Stadium; Attendance: 1,503; Referee: Greg Dopka
Note: Match rescheduled from October 5.

October 19 34	Real Monarchs	3–0	Sacramento Republic FC	Herriman, Utah
8:00 PM	Ryden 45'; Mulholland (yellow card) 48', (goal) 50'; Blake (yellow card) 56'; Martínez 61', (yellow card) 82'	Report	Villarreal (yellow card) 24'; Taintor (yellow card) 43'; McCrary (yellow card) 85'	Stadium: Zions Bank Stadium; Attendance: 2,131; Referee: Elvis Osmanovic

==== USL Cup Playoffs ====
October 26 Conf. Quarterfinals	Real Monarchs	6–2	Orange County SC	Herriman, Utah
1:00 PM MDT	Chang 13'; Martinez 28'; Mulholland (yellow card) 34'; Blake 59', 90'; Schmitt 77'; Holt 81'	Report	Orozco 35', (yellow card) 80'; Forrester (yellow card) 40' (red card) 49'; Hume (yellow card) 67'; Seaton 90+1'	Stadium: Zions Bank Stadium; Attendance: 2,749; Referee: Ismir Pekmic

November 1 Conf. Semifinals	Phoenix Rising FC	1–2	Real Monarchs	Scottsdale, Arizona
7:30 pm MST	Flemmings 25'; Asante (yellow card) 47'	Report	Blake 33', (yellow card) 61'; Chang 43'; Powder (yellow card) 84'	Stadium: Casino Arizona Field; Attendance: 7,548; Referee: Jon Freemon

November 9 Conf. Final	Real Monarchs	2–1 (a.e.t.)	El Paso Locomotive FC	Herriman, Utah
2:00 PM	Schmitt (yellow card) 21'; Ryden 48'; Portillo (yellow card) 88'; Mulholland (yellow card) 90+4'; Holt (yellow card) 116', (goal) 120'	Report	Fox 45+1'; Kiffe (yellow card) 47' (yellow-red card) 51'; Gómez (yellow card) 71'	Stadium: Zions Bank Stadium; Attendance: 4,521; Referee: Rosendo Mendoza; Assistant referees: Tom Felice; Diego Blas; Fourth official: Elton Garcia

November 17 Final	Louisville City FC	1–3	Real Monarchs	Louisville, Kentucky
5:30 PM MST	Rasmussen 6'; Williams (yellow card) 89'	Report	Holt 25', (yellow card) 69'; Plewa 45'; Schmitt (yellow card) 59'; Powder 66'	Stadium: Louisville Slugger Field; Attendance: 7,025; Referee: Tim Ford; Assistant referees: Jeremy Kieso, Cory Richardson, Chris Elliott (reserve asst.); Fourth official: Malik Badawi

=== U.S. Open Cup ===
Due to being owned by a higher division professional club (Real Salt Lake), Real Monarchs is one of 13 teams expressly forbidden from entering the Cup competition.
