= Alexandros Tabakis =

Greek footballer (born 1992)

Alexandros Tambakis
Personal information
- Full name: Alexandros Tambakis
- Date of birth: 8 December 1992 (age 33)
- Place of birth: Athens, Greece
- Height: 1.91 m (6 ft 3 in)
- Position: Goalkeeper

Team information
- Current team: FC Tulsa
- Number: 1

Youth career
- 2005–2011: Panathinaikos

Senior career*
Years	Team	Apps	(Gls)
2011–2016	Panathinaikos	1	(0)
2014–2015	→ Niki Volos (loan)	4	(0)
2015	→ VVV-Venlo (loan)	0	(0)
2016	Charleston Battery	21	(0)
2017	Atlanta United	1	(0)
2017	→ Charleston Battery (loan)	8	(0)
2018–2020	North Carolina FC	77	(0)
2021–2025	New Mexico United	134	(0)
2026–	FC Tulsa	10	(0)

International career
2010–2011	Greece U19	4	(0)
- * Club domestic league appearances and goals as of November 10, 2026

Alexandros Tabakis (Greek: Αλέξανδρος Ταμπάκης; born 8 December 1992), also known as Alex Tambakis, is a Greek professional footballer who played as a goalkeeper for USL Championship side FC Tulsa.

== Career ==
He started playing football for Takis Oikonomopoulos's academy, in Artemida, Attica, from there, he moved to Paiania (training ground) to be a member of Panathinaikos's youth academies. He was promoted to the first team on 1 July 2011, signing a contract which would keep him in Panathinaikos until 2016. He made his debut as a player of the first team on 23 April 2012 at a 4–0 win against Panetolikos F.C., replacing Kotsolis on the 86th minute of the game.

On 2 February 2015 Tabakis was loaned to Eerste Divisie side VVV-Venlo until the end of the season, but he did not make an appearance with the first team before returning. He made two appearances with the Under-21 side, and he was also named to the squad for Venlo's first-round promotion playoff matches against Oss, ahead of Eric Verstappen.

On 25 January 2016 Tambakis transferred from Panathinaikos to Atlanta United FC on a free transfer. He became the first player to be signed by the club, who were set to make their debut in the 2017 season. He was immediately sent on loan to third division with Charleston Battery. Tambakis made 19 appearances for the Battery in 2016, as well as 2 in the postseason, keeping 6 clean sheets. Tambakis was loaned back out to Charleston ahead of the 2017 season, and was recalled multiple times by Atlanta throughout the season. Tambakis made his first teamsheet with Atlanta on 18 March, listed ahead of Kyle Reynish as the reserve goalkeeper.

On 3 October 2017 Tambakis made his MLS debut, coming on as a substitute for Reynish, who was sent off for denying Minnesota United forward Abu Danladi a clear goal-scoring opportunity. Entering the game at a 1–0 deficit, Atlanta would score two goals before conceding two more in the 3–2 defeat. Tambakis was in the squad because first-choice goalkeeper Brad Guzan was away at international duty, and second-choice Alec Kann was out injured.

After his option was declined following the 2017 season, Tambakis' rights were traded by Atlanta on 10 December 2017 to Sporting Kansas City along with Kenwyne Jones's rights and a 2021 MLS SuperDraft pick in exchange for a second-round pick in the 2018 MLS SuperDraft, Kevin Oliveira, and Tyler Pasher.

On 2 March 2018 Tambakis joined USL side North Carolina FC.

On 11 March 2021 Tambakis joined New Mexico United. He was named New Mexico United's Defensive Player of the Year following the 2022 season.

On 9 January 2026, FC Tusla announced that Tambakis signed with the team for the 2026 season.

== Career statistics ==
As of match played 10 July 2024

Appearances and goals by club, season and competition
Club	Season	League			National Cup		League Cup		Continental		Total	
Club	Season	Division	Apps	Goals	Apps	Goals	Apps	Goals	Apps	Goals	Apps	Goals
Panathinaikos F.C.	2011/12	Super League Greece	1	0	0	0	0	0	0	0	1	0
Panathinaikos F.C.	2012/13	Super League Greece	0	0	0	0	0	0	0	0	0	0
Panathinaikos F.C.	2013/14	Super League Greece	0	0	0	0	0	0	—		0	0
Panathinaikos F.C.	2014/15	Super League Greece	0	0	0	0	0	0	0	0	0	0
Panathinaikos F.C.	2015/16	Super League Greece	0	0	0	0	0	0	0	0	0	0
Panathinaikos F.C.	Total		1	0	0	0	0	0	0	0	1	0
Niki Volos F.C. (loan)	2014/15	Super League Greece	4	0	0	0	—		—		4	0
VVV-Venlo (loan)	2014/15	Eerste Divisie	0	0	0	0	0	0	—		0	0
Atlanta United FC	2017	MLS	1	0	0	0	0	0	—		1	0
Charleston Battery (loan) (Note: Player signed for Atlanta United FC in 2016; the club began play in the 2017 season)	2016	USL	19	0	0	0	2 (Note: Appearance(s) in USL playoffs)	0	—		21	0
Charleston Battery (loan)	2017	USL	8	0	0	0	0	0	—		8	0
Charleston Battery (loan)	Total		27	0	0	0	2	0	—		29	0
North Carolina FC	2018	USL	33	0	1	0	—		—		34	0
North Carolina FC	2019	USL Championship	29	0	1 (Note: Appearance(s) in U.S. Open Cup)	0	1	0	—		32	0
North Carolina FC	2020	USL Championship	14	0	—		—		—		14	0
North Carolina FC	Total		77	0	2	0	1	0	—		80	0
New Mexico United	2021	USL Championship	31	0	—		—		—		31	0
New Mexico United	2022	USL Championship	30	0	0	0	—		—		20	0
New Mexico United	2023	USL Championship	25	0	1	0	—		—		26	0
New Mexico United	2024	USL Championship	15	0	3	0	—		—		18	0
New Mexico United			101	0	4	0	—		—		105	0
Career total			211	0	6	0	3	0	0	0	220	0

== Honours ==
Panathinaikos

- Greek Cup: 2014
