= Brandon Hudgins =

American middle-distance runner

Personal information
- Nationality: American
- Born: January 14, 1987 (age 39) Rock Hill, South Carolina, U.S.

Sport
- Sport: Track
- Events: 1500 meters, mile
- College team: Winthrop; Appalachian State
- Club: High Point Athletic Club
- Turned pro: 2011

Achievements and titles
- Personal bests: 1500m: 3:38.20; Mile: 3:59.67
- Updated on February 3, 2018

Brandon Hudgins (born January 14, 1987) is an American middle-distance runner. He is known for having stopped running when he experienced three episodes of granulomatosis with polyangiitis, and subsequently making a comeback to run a sub-four minute mile at the age of 28 as a non-professional athlete. In 2018 he co-founded the High Point Athletic Club, a run coach service based in High Point, North Carolina. The High Point Athletic Club opened a physical location in Jamestown, North Carolina, in October 2022.

== Running career ==
=== High school ===
Hudgins attended Northwestern High School of Rock Hill, South Carolina, where he ran cross country and track. When he graduated in 2005, he was the South Carolina state champion in the boy's outdoor 1600 meters, posting a time of 4:16.

=== Collegiate ===
Hudgins enrolled at Winthrop University where he made further improvements in his first two years. During his junior year at university, he experienced his first episode of granulomatosis with polyangiitis. He went on to complete his undergraduate degree at Winthrop without running competitively during his junior and senior years of undergrad studies. As a graduate student, he went on to study at Appalachian State University, where he made a return to competitive running. At ASU, he posted personal bests of 3:45 in the 1500 meters and 1:50 in the 800 meters, which were actually faster than his previous bests before contracting granulomatosis. He graduated from ASU in 2011.

=== Post-collegiate ===
After graduating from ASU, Hudgins signed a semi-professional contract with Saucony. However, his body experienced new episodes of granulomatosis starting from 2012, after which Saucony stopped sponsoring him due to lack of performance. After having lost his sponsorship, he began working full-time at the Westglow Spa in Blowing Rock, North Carolina. During this time he got coached by James Snyder, one of his former coaches at ASU. Hudgins training typically involved a volume of 75–90 miles per week even while working. On August 7, 2015, Hudgins placed fifth in the men's elite heat at the 2015 Sir Walter Miler, with a time of 3:59.67.

== Writings ==
Brandon has a blog page that has amassed nearly 50k hits. The blog focuses on his life a Vasculitis patient, a professional runner, and his battles with anxiety and depression. On August 15, 2017, Brandon self published his book, Going the Distance, on ebook exclusively for Kindle. The book became available in paperback a few days later on August 19. In the book Brandon describes much of his journey through the last 10 years of his life on his journey to make the Olympic Track and Field Trials in 2016.
