= Northwestern High School (South Carolina) =

Location
- 2503 West Main Street; Rock Hill, South Carolina 29732; United States; 34°56′59″N 81°05′01″W

Information
- Type: Public high school
- Motto: Tradition Never Graduates
- Established: 1971 (55 years ago)
- Principal: Michael Abraham
- Staff: 106.00 (FTE)
- Grades: 9–12
- Enrollment: 1,764 (2023-2024)
- Student to teacher ratio: 16.64
- Campus type: Suburban
- Colors: Purple and gold
- Nickname: Trojans
- Yearbook: Aeneid
- Website: nwhs.rock-hill.k12.sc.us

Northwestern High School is one of three high schools in Rock Hill, South Carolina, United States. It was opened in 1971 as the city's second high school, replacing Emmett Scott High School, which had been designated for African American students during the era of segregated schools. Along with rival Rock Hill High School, it is one of the 16 largest schools in the state by enrollment, with about 1,791 students in grades 9–12.

Northwestern offers the International Baccalaureate diploma.

Presidential candidate Barack Obama spoke at Northwestern on October 6, 2007.

== Athletics ==
=== Football ===
The Northwestern Trojans are in Region III-AAAAA in the state of South Carolina. There are seventeen sports with thirty teams representing the school. The Trojans have a rich tradition both on and off the field. The football team is consistently ranked in the top ten in South Carolina and has played in six of the last eight state championships winning the championship in 1989, 1993, 2010, 2013, 2015, and 2024. The soccer team has been in the state championship game five out of the last six years, winning the championship in the 2006 and 2008 seasons. In 2009, they had an undefeated season.

In the 4A State Championship game, the Trojans defeated Irmo 3–1, claiming the State Championship as well as the ESPN Rise High School National Championship. The following season, the teams met up again in the 4A State Championship game. Northwestern once again proved too much for the Yellow Jackets, winning 4–2. This secured their third consecutive championship and their fourth title in five years.

In the 2009 football season, the Trojans defeated rivals South Pointe High School in the 4A state-semifinals on November 27, 2009, at the Rock Hill School District Football Stadium. This propelled them to the state championship game at Williams-Brice Stadium in Columbia where they lost to Berkeley.

On July 10, 2010, it was announced that Northwestern would play South Pointe High School, in a nationally televised double-header on ESPN August 28. Northwestern showed their power offense in that game where they beat South Pointe 42–20. The key came when they scored five touchdowns in 4 minutes and 50 seconds in the third quarter, taking a 20–7 deficit to 42–20. In the 2010 football season, the Trojans had a perfect 15–0 season and went to the state championship game at South Carolina's Williams-Brice Stadium, playing Greenwood. The Trojans defeated Greenwood 42–10 and won the state championship. In 2012 second year head coach Kyle Richardson led the Trojans back to the state championship, where they lost to Greenwood in overtime.

In 2010 QB Justin Worley was named National Gatorade Player of the Year, joining previous winners Kobe Bryant, Lebron James, and numerous other pro athletes. Worley is the first and only National Gatorade Player of Year from South Carolina.

=== Other Notable Sports Accomplishments ===
The boys' cross country team won the state championship in 2005 and 2006.

The baseball team is consistently in the playoffs, and has produced numerous collegiate players.

Northwestern athletics have produced several collegiate student-athletes, going to such major universities as Virginia Tech, Clemson University, South Carolina, Florida State, Georgia, Notre Dame, Ohio State and The College of Charleston.

=== State championships ===
- Football: 1989, 1993, 2010, 2013, 2015, 2024, 2025
- Boys' Soccer: 2006, 2008, 2009, 2010
- The Purple Regiment Marching Band: 2008
- Boys' Cross Country: 2005, 2006
- Baseball: 2017

=== National Championships ===
- Boys' Soccer: ESPN Rise 2009 National Champions

== Notable alumni ==
- Sean Barnette, professional basketball player
- Jeff Burris, former NFL player and current college football coach
- Shawn Ferguson, professional soccer player
- Ricky Garbanzo, professional soccer player
- Brandon Hudgins, professional runner
- Johnathan Joseph, NFL cornerback, 2x Pro Bowl selection
- Cheslie Kryst, Miss USA 2019
- Alex Martinez, professional soccer player
- Enzo Martinez, professional soccer player
- Cordarrelle Patterson, NFL wide receiver, 4x Pro Bowl selection and Super Bowl LIII champion with the New England Patriots
- Jamie Robinson, CFL linebacker
- Turbo Richard, college football running back for the Indiana Hoosiers
- Derek Ross, NFL cornerback
- Mason Rudolph, NFL quarterback
- Rick Sanford, NFL defensive back
- Nate Torbett, professional soccer player
- Benjamin Watson, NFL tight end, Super Bowl XXXIX champion with the New England Patriots
