= Kevin Corby (soccer) =

American soccer player

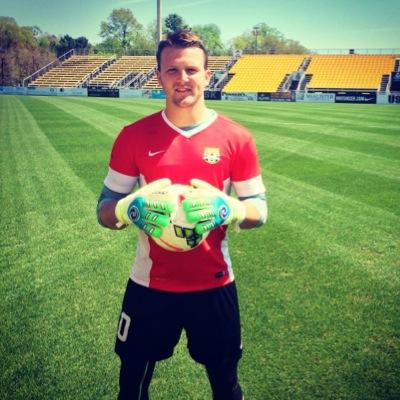

Personal information
- Date of birth: March 23, 1991 (age 35)
- Place of birth: St. Louis, Missouri, United States
- Height: 6 ft 2 in (1.88 m)
- Position: Goalkeeper

Team information
- Current team: Charleston Battery
- Number: 22

College career
Years	Team	Apps	(Gls)
2009–2010	Kentucky Wildcats	1	(0)
2011–2013	UMKC Kangaroos	21	(0)

Senior career*
Years	Team	Apps	(Gls)
2014–2016	St. Louis Ambush (indoor)	2	(0)
2015–2016	Charleston Battery	46	(14)
- * Club domestic league appearances and goals as of 24 January 2019

Kevin Corby is an American soccer player. He was born and raised in the St. Louis area and attended St. Louis University High School while playing for various youth and amateur sides of local club powerhouse St. Louis Scott Gallagher. He began his college career with the Kentucky Wildcats before transferring to the University of Missouri-Kansas City for his final three years of eligibility. Son of Kevin Sr. and Terese Corbin.

Corby was a reserve goalkeeper for the St. Louis Ambush of the Major Arena Soccer League during the 2014–15 season. In early 2015, Corby was invited to the preseason training camp of USL club Charleston Battery and was signed to a professional contract following impressive performances in the Carolina Challenge Cup. Serving as a backup to Odisnel Cooper, Corby made 8 league appearances in 2015 and earned 2 shutouts.
