= Lionel Abate Etoundi =

Cameroonian footballer (born 2000)

Lionel Etoundi
Personal information
- Full name: Lionel Abate Etoundi
- Date of birth: 25 September 2000 (age 26)
- Place of birth: Yaoundé, Cameroon
- Height: 1.80 m (5 ft 11 in)
- Position: Forward

Team information
- Current team: Chełmianka Chełm
- Number: 10

Youth career
- AS Fortuna

Senior career*
Years	Team	Apps	(Gls)
2018–2019	AS Fortuna		
2019	→ Real Monarchs (loan)	9	(1)
2020	OFK Žarkovo	0	(0)
2020–2022	Coton Sport		
2022	Kuźnia Ustroń	14	(9)
2022–2025	Podbeskidzie	37	(6)
2023	→ Wisła Sandomierz (loan)	15	(10)
2025–2026	Železiarne Podbrezová	12	(1)
2025	→ Baník Lehota Vtáčnikom (loan)	17	(3)
2026–	Chełmianka Chełm	5	(1)

International career
2015	Cameroon U17		
- Cameroon U20
- Cameroon U23
- * Club domestic league appearances and goals as of 21:46, 3 June 2026 (UTC)

Lionel Abate Etoundi (born 25 September 2000) is a Cameroonian professional footballer who plays as a forward for Polish club Chełmianka Chełm.

== Club career ==
Etoundi started his career at local Cameroonian side AS Fortuna, from where he made a loan move to the United States joining Real Monarchs. He made nine appearances and scored once for the team in the 2019 USL Championship season. He was part of the championship winning team.

On 18 January 2022, he joined Polish fifth division club Kuźnia Ustroń. In July 2022, Etoundi moved to I liga side Podbeskidzie Bielsko-Biała, initially to play for their reserve team. On 30 August 2022, he was registered to play in I liga and made his debut for the senior team, scoring once in a 2–1 Polish Cup away loss against Lechia Zielona Góra.

On 17 February 2023, he was loaned to fourth division club Wisła Sandomierz until the end of the season.

On 23 January 2025, Etoundi moved to Slovak club Železiarne Podbrezová on a three-and-a-half-year contract.

On 19 January 2026, Etoundi returned to Poland and signed an eighteen-month deal with III liga side Chełmianka Chełm.

== International career ==
Etoundi had been regular in Cameroonian youth squads since 2015, having started then with the U17 level, followed by U20, before joining the U23 squad where it has made greatest impact, especially during 2018.

== Honours ==
Real Monarchs

- USL Championship: 2019
