= Romario Williams =

Jamaican footballer (born 1994)

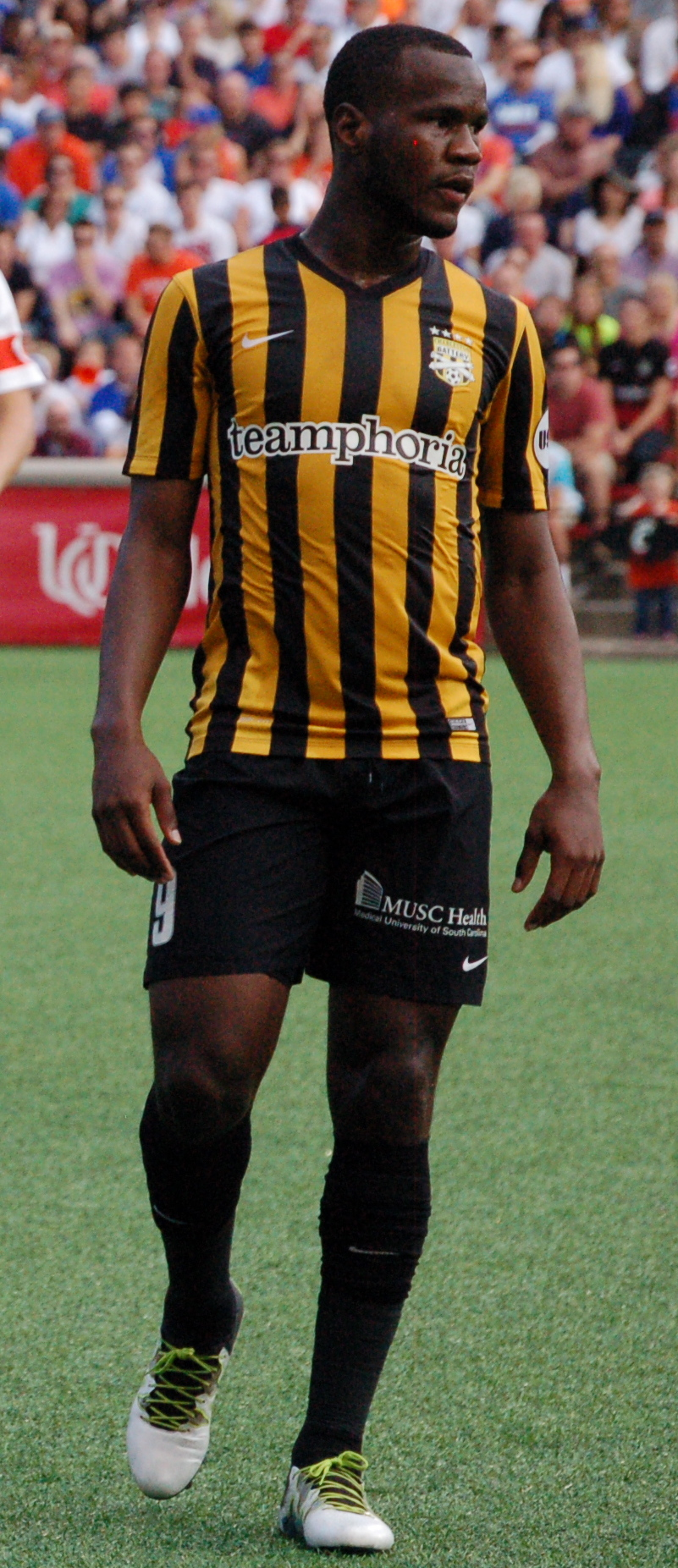
- Williams playing for Charleston Battery in 2016

Personal information
- Full name: Romario Garfield Williams
- Date of birth: 15 August 1994 (age 32)
- Place of birth: Portmore, Jamaica
- Height: 6 ft 0 in (1.83 m)
- Position: Forward

Team information
- Current team: Birmingham Legion

College career
Years	Team	Apps	(Gls)
2012–2014	UCF Knights	51	(18)

Senior career*
Years	Team	Apps	(Gls)
2014	Orlando City U-23	11	(7)
2015–2016	Montreal Impact	2	(0)
2015	→ FC Montreal (loan)	7	(0)
2016	→ Charleston Battery (loan)	27	(10)
2017–2019	Atlanta United	19	(2)
2017	→ Charleston Battery (loan)	22	(15)
2018–2019	→ Atlanta United 2 (loan)	12	(7)
2019	Columbus Crew	7	(1)
2020	Miami FC	16	(8)
2020–2021	Al-Ittihad	23	(5)
2021–2022	Qadsia SC	10	(3)
2022	New Mexico United	10	(1)
2023	Colorado Springs Switchbacks	29	(15)
2024	Hartford Athletic	11	(2)
2024–2025	Indy Eleven	39	(8)
2026–	Birmingham Legion	26	(7)

International career^{‡}
2010–2011	Jamaica U17	4	(1)
2015	Jamaica U23	3	(3)
2016–	Jamaica	25	(4)
Medal record
Men's football
Representing Jamaica
CONCACAF Gold Cup
Runner-up	2017 United States	Team
CONCACAF Nations League
Bronze medal – third place	2024 United States	Team
- * Club domestic league appearances and goals as of 23:42, 3 November 2026 (UTC) ‡ National team caps and goals as of 12:53, 10 June 2025 (UTC)

Romario Garfield Williams (born 15 August 1994) is a Jamaican professional footballer who plays as a forward for USL Championship club Birmingham Legion FC and the Jamaica national team. He is named after the legendary Brazilian footballer, Romário.

== Club career ==
=== Youth ===
Williams graduated from Kingston College in Jamaica and then attended university in Orlando. He played college soccer at the University of Central Florida. With the UCF Knights men's soccer program, Williams recorded 18 goals and five assists in 51 games, 46 as starter. He was a unanimous selection to the American Athletic Conference all-conference first team in 2014. He was also the 2013 American Athletic Conference Player of the Year.

=== Professional ===
Williams was selected by Montreal Impact third overall in the 2015 MLS SuperDraft on 15 January 2015. He made his professional debut on 28 March 2015 in a 2–2 draw against Orlando City SC.

On 11 December 2016 Atlanta United FC acquired Williams from the Impact in exchange for a third-round selection in the 2018 MLS SuperDraft. On 7 April 2018, he scored his first career MLS goal in a 5–0 rout of Los Angeles FC.

On 1 July 2019, Williams was traded to Columbus Crew SC in exchange for $100,000 of General Allocation Money. After one season with the crew, Williams joined Miami FC of the USL Championship in January 2020.

In December 2020 Williams moved abroad to Egypt and joined Al Ittihad of the Egyptian Premier League. On 16 August 2021, Williams moved abroad to Kuwait and joined Qadsia SC of the Kuwait Premier League.

In July, 2022 Williams signed a contract with USL Championship side New Mexico United

Williams signed with Colorado Springs Switchbacks FC on January 5, 2023.

==== Hartford Athletic ====
On 4 January 2024, Williams signed with Hartford Athletic. In the season opener and his debut with the club on 9 March, Williams would slot in a penalty to score his first goal for Hartford and help them defeat El Paso Locomotive in a 1–0 win. Williams made 12 total league and cup appearances for Hartford in 2024, scoring 3 goals.

==== Indy Eleven ====
On 14 June 2024, Williams was traded to fellow USL Championship side Indy Eleven in exchange for defender Younes Boudadi. He made his debut for the Indianapolis-based club on 22 June, replacing Jack Blake at halftime in a 1–0 home loss to Orange County SC. Williams scored his first goal for the club on 31 August in a 1–1 home draw against Pittsburgh Riverhounds SC. He ended the season with two league goals and an assist for the club. On 20 November 2024, Indy Eleven announced that Williams would remain with the team for a second season.

Williams scored his first brace for Indy on 28 May 2025, scoring on either side of halftime in a 4–4 home draw against his former club Hartford Athletic.

==== Birmingham Legion FC ====
On 11 February 2026, Williams signed with USL Championship club Birmingham Legion for the 2026 season.

== International career ==
Williams has represented the U-17 level of the Jamaica national U-17 team, playing in three games at the 2011 U17 FIFA World Cup. He had previously started four of five games at the CONCACAF qualifiers. He also played for the Jamaica U-23 national team in March 2015.

Williams made his Jamaica senior national team debut in a 1–0 Caribbean Cup qualify win over Suriname on 13 November 2016. He was called up for Jamaica's 2024-25 CONCACAF Nations League A and scored the second goal in a 2–0 away win against Nicaragua on 10 October 2024.

Williams was called up for Jamaica's two 2026 FIFA World Cup qualifying matches in June 2025 against the British Virgin Islands and Guatemala as well as the 2025 CONCACAF Gold Cup.

== Personal ==
Williams is named after Romário, Brazilian football legend who won the 1994 FIFA World Cup a month before he was born.

== Career statistics ==
=== Club ===
As of match played 30 August 2025.

Club	Season	League			Playoffs (Note: All appearances in the USL Cup Playoffs)		National Cup (Note: All appearances in the U.S. Open Cup)		League Cup		Continental		Total	
Club	Season	Division	Apps	Goals	Apps	Goals	Apps	Goals	Apps	Goals	Apps	Goals	Apps	Goals
Orlando City U-23	2014	PDL	11	7	–		–		–		–		11	7
Montreal Impact	2015	MLS	2	0	0	0	0	0	–		0	0	2	0
Montreal Impact	2016	MLS	0	0	0	0	0	0	–		–		0	0
Montreal Impact	Total		2	0	0	0	0	0			0	0	2	0
FC Montreal (loan)	2015	USL	7	0	–		–		–		–		7	0
Charleston Battery (loan)	2016	USL	27	10	2	0	1	0	–		–		30	10
Atlanta United	2017	MLS	0	0	0	0	0	0	–		–		0	0
Atlanta United	2018	MLS	17	1	0	0	2	1	–		–		19	2
Atlanta United	2019	MLS	2	0	0	0	1	1	–		1	0	4	1
Atlanta United	Total		19	1	0	0	3	2	0	0	1	0	23	3
Charleston Battery (loan)	2017	USL	22	15	1	0	1	0	–		–		24	15
Atlanta United 2 (loan)	2018	USL	7	4	–		–		–		–		7	4
Atlanta United 2 (loan)	2019	USL C	5	3	0	0	–		–		–		5	3
Atlanta United 2 (loan)	Total		12	7	0	0	0	0	0	0	0	0	12	7
Columbus Crew SC	2019	MLS	7	1	–		0	0	–		–		7	1
Miami FC	2020	USL C	16	8	–		0	0	–		–		16	8
Al-Ittihad	2020–21	Egyptian P. L.	23	5	0	0	0	0	–		–		23	5
Qadsia SC	2021–22	Kuwaiti P. L.	10	3	0	0	0	0	–		–		10	3
New Mexico United	2022	USL C	10	1	0	0	0	0	–		–		10	1
Colorado Springs Switchbacks	2023	USL C	30	15	1	0	1	0	–		–		32	15
Hartford Athletic	2024	USL C	11	2	–		1	1	–		–		12	3
Indy Eleven	2024	USL C	18	2	1	0	0	0	–		–		19	2
Indy Eleven	2025	USL C	12	5	0	0	1	0	4	1	–		17	6
Indy Eleven	Total		30	7	1	0	1	0	4	1	0	0	36	8
Career total			237	82	5	0	8	3	4	1	1	0	255	86

=== International ===
As of 7 June 2025

Jamaica
Year	Apps	Goals
2016	1	0
2017	10	2
2018	3	0
2019	0	0
2020	0	0
2021	1	0
2022	0	0
2023	4	1
2024	5	1
2025	1	0
Total	25	4

Scores and results list Jamaica's goal tally first.

International goals
No.	Date	Venue	Opponent	Score	Result	Competition
1.	9 July 2017	Qualcomm Stadium, San Diego, United States	Curaçao	1–0	2–0	2017 CONCACAF Gold Cup
2.	20 July 2017	University of Phoenix Stadium, Glendale, United States	Canada	2–0	2–1	2017 CONCACAF Gold Cup
3.	12 October 2023	Kirani James Athletic Stadium, St. George's, Grenada	Grenada	1–0	4–1	2023–24 CONCACAF Nations League A
4.	10 October 2024	Nicaragua National Football Stadium, Managua, Nicaragua	Nicaragua	2–0	2–0	2024–25 CONCACAF Nations League A

== Honours ==
Jamaica

- CONCACAF Gold Cup runner-up: 2017
- CONCACAF Nations League third place: 2024

Atlanta United

- MLS Cup: 2018
- Eastern Conference: 2018

Individual

- AAC Offensive Player of the Year: 2013
