= Emmanuel Adjetey =

Ghanaian footballer

Personal information
- Full name: Emmanuel Adjetey
- Date of birth: December 15, 1988 (age 37)
- Place of birth: Accra, Ghana
- Height: 5 ft 5 in (1.65 m)
- Positions: Midfielder; defender

Youth career
- Prestea Mine Stars
- Ashanti Gold SC

Senior career*
Years	Team	Apps	(Gls)
2008–2011	Ashanti Gold SC		
2011–2012	Liberty Professionals		
2012–2013	International Allies		
2013–14	Vancouver Whitecaps FC U-23		
2013	→ Charleston Battery (loan)	7	(0)
2014–2016	Charleston Battery	64	(0)

International career^{‡}
2005	Ghana U17	1	(0)
- * Club domestic league appearances and goals as of September 28, 2016 ‡ National team caps and goals as of June 28, 2008

Emmanuel Adjetey (born December 15, 1988) is a Ghanaian footballer who last played for Charleston Battery of USL Pro. Adjetey plays as a left back and left winger, and is also a free kick specialist.

== Career ==
Adjetey began his career by Prestea Mine Stars, before in 2005 joined to Ashanti Gold SC. In January 2008 debuted for Ashanti Gold S.C. first team.

In 2013, Adjetey was invited to join the development squad of the Vancouver Whitecaps of Major League Soccer. Adjetey was loaned to USL club Charleston Battery in 2013 and signed with Charleston permanently the following year.

Adjetey is not retired.

== International career ==
He was member of Ghana U-17 team 2005.
