= Adam Mena =

American soccer player (born 1989)

Personal information
- Full name: Bonifacio Adam Mena
- Date of birth: August 9, 1989 (age 37)
- Place of birth: Holland, Michigan, United States
- Height: 1.78 m (5 ft 10 in)
- Positions: Midfielder; forward

Youth career
- 2008–2012: Notre Dame Fighting Irish

Senior career*
Years	Team	Apps	(Gls)
2008	West Michigan Edge	12	(1)
2009	Kalamazoo Outrage	3	(0)
2009–2011	Indiana Invaders	16	(14)
2014	Charleston Battery	9	(0)
- * Club domestic league appearances and goals as of April 11, 2014

Bonifacio Adam Mena (born August 9, 1989) is an American soccer player who previously played for Charleston Battery in the USL Pro.

== Career ==
=== College and amateur ===
Mena spent his entire college career at the University of Notre Dame. After going through the entire 2008 season without making an appearance, Mena made 16 appearances in 2009 and tallied one goal. In 2010, Mena made 20 appearances and finished the year with two goals. In 2011, he appeared in 18 matches and finished the year with three goals and five assists. In 2012, Mena decided to return to Notre Dame for a fifth year, however his season was cut short after suffering a season-ending injury in the opener against Duke.

During his time at Notre Dame, Mena also played in the USL Premier Development League with West Michigan Edge, Kalamazoo Outrage and Indiana Invaders.

=== Professional ===
On January 22, 2013, Mena was drafted 10th overall in the 2013 MLS Supplemental Draft by Vancouver Whitecaps FC. However, he did not sign with the club. On March 21, 2014, it was announced that Mena had joined USL Pro club Charleston Battery for the 2014 season. He made his professional the following day in a 1–1 draw with defending USL Pro champions Orlando City.
