= Jose Nazareno =

Ecuadorian footballer (born 1997)

José Nazareno
Personal information
- Full name: José Domingo Nazareno Canga
- Date of birth: July 16, 1997 (age 29)
- Place of birth: Guayaquil, Ecuador
- Height: 1.74 m (5 ft 8 1/2 in)
- Position: Forward

Youth career
- Independiente del Valle

Senior career*
Years	Team	Apps	(Gls)
2016	Charleston Battery	3	(0)
- * Club domestic league appearances and goals as of 25 September 2016

José "Yepito" Domingo Nazareno Canga (born 16 July 1997) is an Ecuadorian professional footballer who plays as a forward.

== Career ==
Nazareno played with Ecuadorian side Independiente del Valle until 2016, when he signed with United Soccer League side Charleston Battery on 6 May 2016. ,
