= Damian German =

American soccer player

Personal information
- Date of birth: June 17, 1996 (age 30)
- Place of birth: Phoenix, Arizona, United States
- Height: 5 ft 9 in (1.75 m)
- Positions: Winger; forward

Youth career
- 2013–2015: Real Salt Lake AZ

College career
Years	Team	Apps	(Gls)
2015–2017	Grand Canyon Antelopes	53	(11)
2018	San Diego State Aztecs	18	(5)

Senior career*
Years	Team	Apps	(Gls)
2016	FC Tucson	12	(6)
2018	FC Tucson	12	(11)
2019–2020	Real Monarchs	12	(3)
2022	St George City	24	(7)
- * Club domestic league appearances and goals as of October 5, 2020

Damian German (born June 17, 1996) is an American soccer player who plays as a forward.

== Career ==
=== College and amateur ===
German played three years of college soccer at Grand Canyon University between 2015 and 2017, before transferring to San Diego State University for his senior year in 2018.

German also played with USL Premier Development League side FC Tucson in 2016 and 2018.

=== Professional ===
On January 22, 2019, German signed for Real Monarchs of the USL Championship. His option was declined by Real Monarchs following the 2020 season.

== Personal life ==
German has three siblings, including a younger brother named Isais who was his teammate at FC Tucson in 2018.
