= Shawn Ferguson =

American soccer player

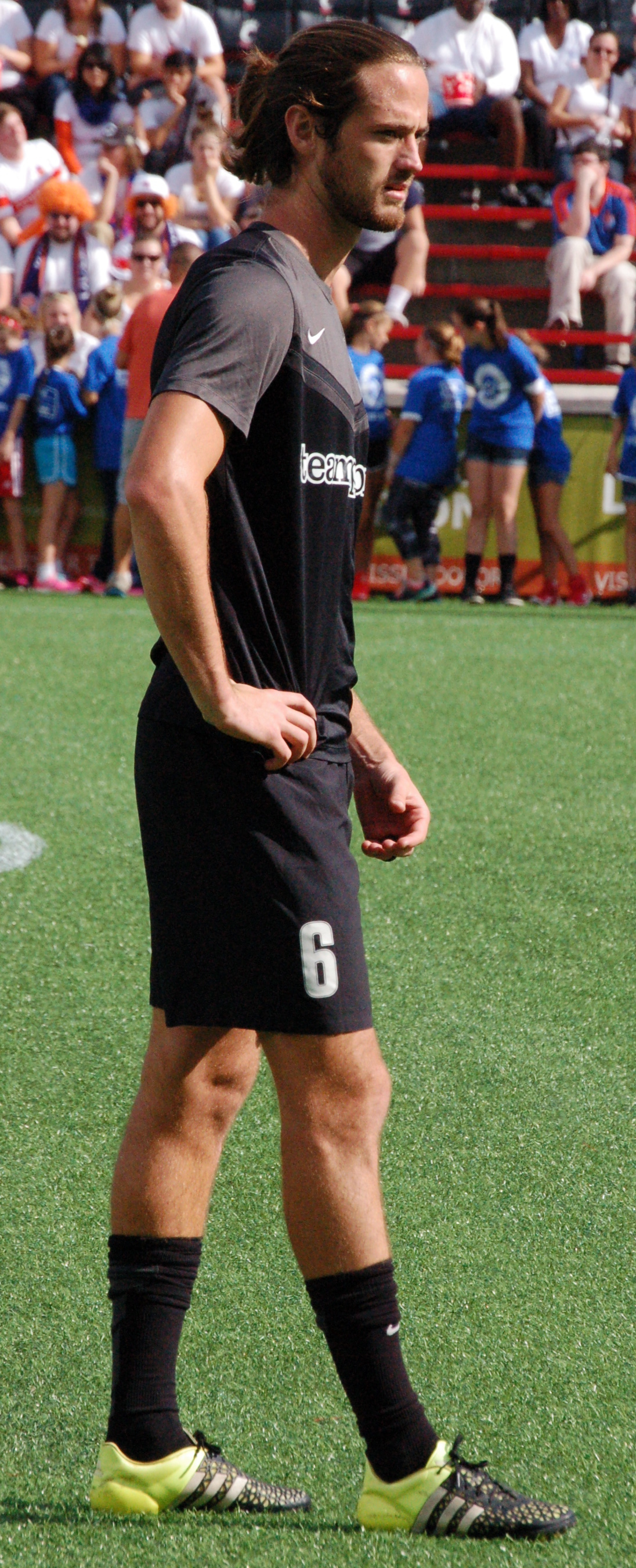
- Ferguson playing for Charleston Battery in 2016

Personal information
- Date of birth: January 21, 1991 (age 35)
- Place of birth: Rock Hill, South Carolina, U.S.
- Height: 6 ft 3 in (1.91 m)
- Position: Center back

Youth career
- Discoveries SC
- 2005–2009: Northwestern Trojans

College career
Years	Team	Apps	(Gls)
2009–2012	College of Charleston Cougars		

Senior career*
Years	Team	Apps	(Gls)
2013–2016	Charleston Battery	104	(5)
- * Club domestic league appearances and goals as of September 28, 2016

Shawn Ferguson (born January 21, 1991) is an American retired soccer player who formerly played for Charleston Battery in the United Soccer League.

== Career ==
Born in Rock Hill, South Carolina, Ferguson started his career with Discoveries Soccer Club and Northwestern High School, playing on both teams with future Battery teammate Ricky Garbanzo. He attended the College of Charleston and played as a center back on the Cougars soccer team.

While still finishing his college degree, Ferguson signed with USL Professional Division club Charleston Battery on April 3, 2013. During the 2014 season Ferguson became a first-choice starter in central defense alongside Colin Falvey. Ferguson had a breakthrough season in 2015, starting 27 of 28 league matches and being voted the club's defender of year by fans as well as being named a First Team All-USL selection by the league.

Prior to the 2016 season, Ferguson was named team captain by coach Mike Anhaeuser.

Ferguson retired shortly before the 2017 season.
