= Heviel Cordovés =

Cuban footballer

Personal information
- Full name: Heviel Cordovés González
- Date of birth: November 10, 1989 (age 37)
- Place of birth: Arroyo Naranjo, Havana, Cuba
- Height: 1.88 m (6 ft 2 in)
- Position: Forward

Senior career*
Years	Team	Apps	(Gls)
2008–2012	Ciudad de la Habana		
2013–2017	Charleston Battery	120	(27)
2018	Richmond Kickers	24	(7)
2019	Memphis 901	0	(0)

International career^{‡}
2008–2012	Cuba	9	(1)
- * Club domestic league appearances and goals as of 20:16, 15 October 2018 (UTC) ‡ National team caps and goals as of April 11, 2014

Heviel Cordovés González (born 10 November 1989) is a former Cuban international footballer.

== Club career ==
Cordovés played for hometown team Ciudad de la Habana before his move to the USA where he joined Charleston Battery. In December 2017, he joined fellow United Soccer League side Richmond Kickers.

== International career ==
He made his international debut for Cuba in an August 2008 FIFA World Cup qualification match against Trinidad and Tobago and has earned a total of 9 caps, scoring 1 goal. He represented his country in 4 FIFA World Cup qualifying matches and was named in Cuba's squad for the 2011 Pan-American games and was also named in Cuba's squad that would attempt to qualify for the 2012 Summer Olympics football tournament.

In October 2012, he defected to United States along with teammates Maikel Chang and Odisnel Cooper prior to a 2014 World Cup qualifying game versus Canada in Toronto.

=== International goals ===
Scores and results list Cuba's goal tally first.

Number	Date	Location	Opponent	Score	Competition
1	11 December 2011	Estadio Pedro Marrero, Havana, Cuba	Costa Rica	1-0	Friendly match
