= Maikel Chang =

Cuban footballer (born 1991)

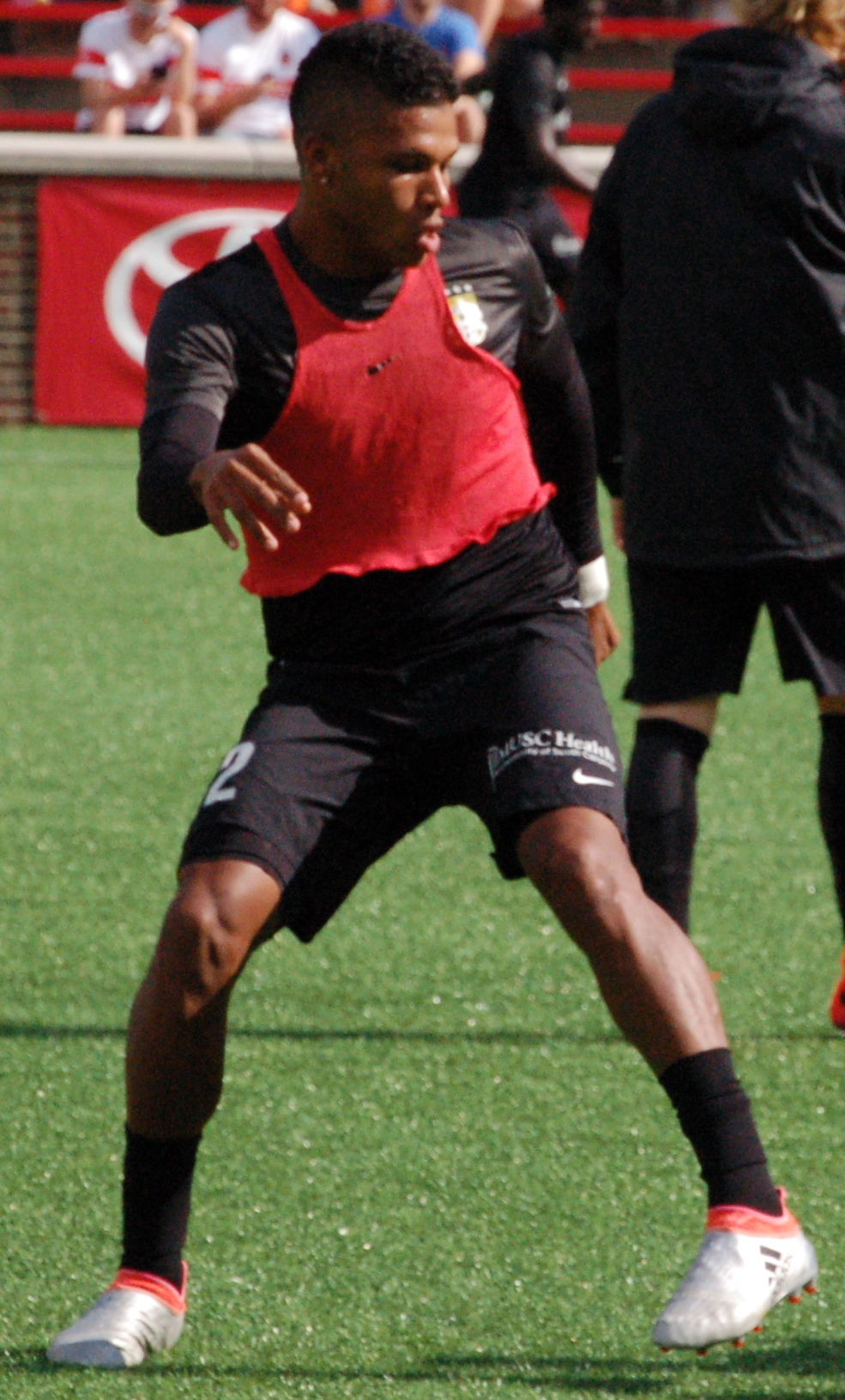
- Chang with Charleston Battery in 2016

Personal information
- Full name: Maikel Chang Ramirez
- Date of birth: April 18, 1991 (age 35)
- Place of birth: Havana, Cuba
- Height: 1.78 m (5 ft 10 in)
- Position: Winger

Senior career*
Years	Team	Apps	(Gls)
2009–2010	Industriales	?	(?)
2010–2012	Ciudad de la Habana	?	(?)
2013–2017	Charleston Battery	110	(14)
2018–2019	Real Monarchs	67	(17)
2020–2024	Real Salt Lake	124	(5)

International career^{‡}
2012	Cuba	3	(0)
- * Club domestic league appearances and goals as of 03:51, 30 November 2024 (UTC) ‡ National team caps and goals as of 1 March 2012

Maikel Chang Ramírez (born April 18, 1991) is a Cuban professional footballer who most recently played as a winger for Major League Soccer Club Real Salt Lake.

== Club career ==
Born in Havana, Chang played for local clubs Industriales and Ciudad de la Habana, before leaving the country and joining Charleston Battery in 2013. He moved to USL side Real Monarchs for the 2018 season.

Maikel Chang became the first player in the league's modern era to reach 30 career assists. Chang arrived at the Monarchs after four seasons with the Charleston Battery where he played 7,981 minutes and scored 15 goals in 109 matches played.

Additionally, Chang scored 15 goals – two of them in the final playoffs – and assisted his teammates eight times.

On 18 November 2019, the Cuban reached the title of champion after defeating Louisville City in the grand final.

On 21 November 2019, Chang moved up to MLS with Real Salt Lake.

== Career statistics ==
As of match played on 1 June 2023

Club statistics
Club	Season	League			National Cup		Other		Total	
Club	Season	Division	Apps	Goals	Apps	Goals	Apps	Goals	Apps	Goals
Charleston Battery	2013	USL Pro	6	0	0	0	—		6	0
Charleston Battery	2014	USL Pro	18	2	0	0	1 (Note: Appearance in the 2014 USL Pro Play-offs)	0	19	2
Charleston Battery	2015	United Soccer League	26	3	2	0	2 (Note: Appearances in the 2015 USL Play-offs)	0	30	3
Charleston Battery	2016	United Soccer League	29	5	1	0	2 (Note: Appearances in the 2016 USL Play-offs)	0	32	5
Charleston Battery	2017	United Soccer League	31	4	3	0	—		34	4
Charleston Battery	Totals		110	14	6	0	5	0	121	14
Real Monarchs	2018	United Soccer League	32	4	0	0	1 (Note: Appearance in the 2018 USL Play-offs)	0	33	4
Real Monarchs	2019	USL Championship	34	13	0	0	4 (Note: Appearances in the 2019 USL Championship Play-offs)	2	38	15
Real Monarchs	Totals		67	17	0	0	5	2	71	19
Real Salt Lake	2020	Major League Soccer	17	1	0	0	2 (Note: Appearances in the MLS is Back)	0	19	1
Real Salt Lake	2021	Major League Soccer	28	2	0	0	2 (Note: Appearances in the 2021 MLS Cup Playoffs)	0	30	2
Real Salt Lake	2022	Major League Soccer	33	2	1	0	1 (Note: Appearance in the 2022 MLS Cup Playoffs)	0	35	2
Real Salt Lake	2023	Major League Soccer	10	0	3	2	—		13	2
Real Salt Lake	Totals		88	5	4	2	5	0	97	7
Career totals			264	36	10	2	15	2	289	40

== International career ==
He made his international debut for Cuba in a February 2012 friendly match against Jamaica and has earned a total of three caps, scoring no goals.

He defected to the United States in October 2012 having traveled to Toronto with the Cuba national team to face Canada in a World Cup qualifying game.

== Honours ==
Real Monarchs

- USL Cup: 2019
