= Quinton Griffith =

Antiguan footballer

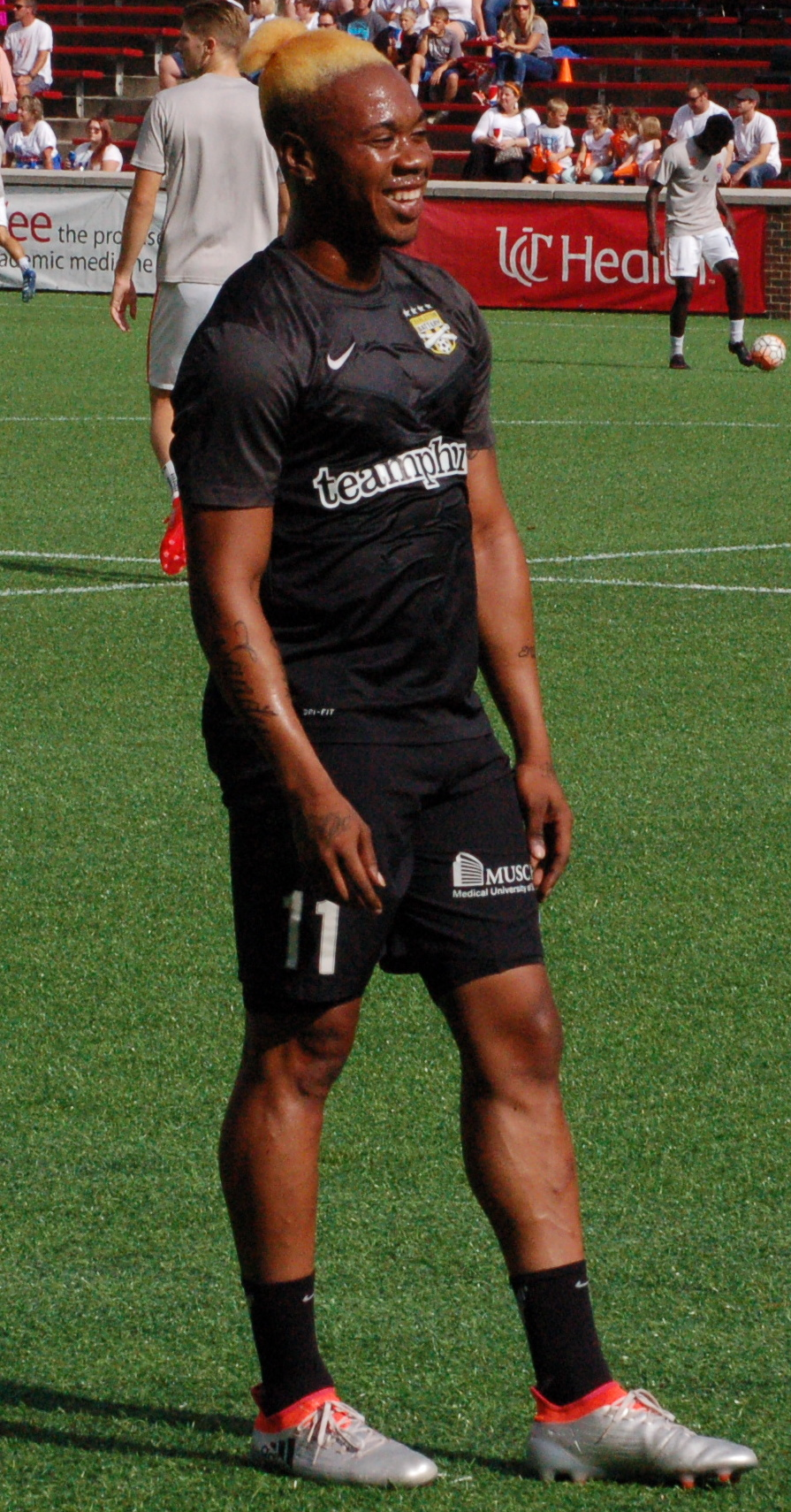
- Griffith with Charleston Battery in 2016

Personal information
- Full name: Quinton Griffith
- Date of birth: 27 February 1992 (age 34)
- Place of birth: St. John's, Antigua and Barbuda
- Height: 1.75 m (5 ft 9 in)
- Positions: Winger; fullback

Team information
- Current team: Five Islands

Senior career*
| Years | Team | Apps | (Gls) |
| 2009–2011 | Golden Stars | | |
| 2011–2012 | Antigua Barracuda FC | 39 | (3) |
| 2013–2018 | Charleston Battery | 120 | (2) |
| 2018– | Five Islands | | |

International career^{‡}
| 2010 | Antigua and Barbuda U20 | 2 | (0) |
| 2011 | Antigua and Barbuda U23 | 1 | (0) |
| 2009– | Antigua and Barbuda | 64 | (9) |
- * Club domestic league appearances and goals as of 09:43, 2 April 2018 (UTC) ‡ National team caps and goals as of 23:57, 27 March 2021 (UTC)

Quinton Griffith (born 27 February 1992) is an Antiguan professional footballer who plays for Five Islands and captains the Antigua and Barbuda national team.

== Club career ==
Griffith began his career in 2009 playing for Golden Stars, who he helped achieved promotion from the Antiguan Second Division to Antiguan First Division in 2008–09.

In 2011 Griffith transferred to the new Antigua Barracuda FC team prior to its first season in the USL Professional Division. He made his debut for the Barracudas on 17 April 2011 in the team's first ever competitive game, a 1–2 loss to the Los Angeles Blues. He signed for Charleston Battery in 2013.

== International career ==
Griffith made his debut for the Antigua and Barbuda national team in 2009, and has since received over fifty caps, scoring nine goals. He was part of the Antigua squad which took part in the final stages of the 2010 Caribbean Championship and 2014 World Cup qualification.

== Career statistics ==
=== International ===
As of match played 27 March 2021.

Antigua and Barbuda
| Year | Apps | Goals |
|---|---|---|
| 2009 | 2 | 1 |
| 2010 | 7 | 0 |
| 2011 | 11 | 1 |
| 2012 | 12 | 2 |
| 2013 | 0 | 0 |
| 2014 | 9 | 1 |
| 2015 | 3 | 0 |
| 2016 | 6 | 0 |
| 2017 | 0 | 0 |
| 2018 | 5 | 1 |
| 2019 | 7 | 1 |
| 2020 | 0 | 0 |
| 2021 | 2 | 2 |
| Total | 64 | 9 |

==== International goals ====
Scores and results list Antigua and Barbuda's goal tally first.

| No. | Date | Venue | Opponent | Score | Result | Competition |
|---|---|---|---|---|---|---|
| 1. | 3 June 2009 | André Kamperveen Stadion, Paramaribo, Suriname | Guyana | 2–1 | 2–1 | 2009 Parbo Bier Cup |
| 2. | 2 September 2011 | Sir Vivian Richards Stadium, St. John's, Antigua and Barbuda | Curaçao | 2–1 | 5–2 | 2014 FIFA World Cup qualification |
| 3. | 16 October 2012 | National Stadium, Kingston, Jamaica | Jamaica | 1–3 | 1–4 | 2014 FIFA World Cup qualification |
| 4. | 9 December 2012 | Antigua Recreation Ground, St. John's, Antigua and Barbuda | Trinidad and Tobago | 2–0 | 2–0 | 2012 Caribbean Cup |
| 5. | 3 September 2014 | Antigua Recreation Ground, St. John's, Antigua and Barbuda | Anguilla | 5–0 | 6–0 | 2014 Caribbean Cup qualification |
| 6. | 19 November 2018 | Stade Pierre-Aliker, Fort-de-France, Martinique | Martinique | 2–4 | 2–4 | 2019–20 CONCACAF Nations League qualification |
| 7. | 11 October 2019 | Sir Vivian Richards Stadium, St. John's, Antigua and Barbuda | Guyana | 1–0 | 2–1 | 2019–20 CONCACAF Nations League B |
| 8. | 27 March 2021 | Bethlehem Soccer Stadium, Upper Bethlehem, U.S. Virgin Islands | U.S. Virgin Islands | 2–0 | 3–0 | 2022 FIFA World Cup qualification |
| 9. | 27 March 2021 | Bethlehem Soccer Stadium, Upper Bethlehem, U.S. Virgin Islands | U.S. Virgin Islands | 3–0 | 3–0 | 2022 FIFA World Cup qualification |
| 10. | 14 October 2023 | Thomas Robinson Stadium, Nassau, Bahamas | Bahamas | 4-1 | 4-1 | 2023–24 CONCACAF Nations League B |
