= Odisnel Cooper =

Cuban international footballer

Personal information
- Full name: Odisnel Cooper Despaigne
- Date of birth: March 31, 1992 (age 34)
- Place of birth: Camagüey, Cuba
- Height: 1.88 m (6 ft 2 in)
- Position: Goalkeeper

Senior career*
Years	Team	Apps	(Gls)
2010–2012	Camagüey		
2013–2018	Charleston Battery	112	(0)

International career
2011–2012	Cuba	7	(0)
- * Club domestic league appearances and goals as of 22:27, 14 October 2018 (UTC)

Odisnel Cooper Despaigne (born March 31, 1992) is a Cuban international footballer.

== Club career ==
Cooper played for hometown club FC Camaguey in Cuba. After defecting to the United States in late 2012, Cooper signed with USL club Charleston Battery along with fellow Cuban defectors Maikel Chang and Heviel Cordovés in 2013. When Cooper first arrived in Charleston, the club discovered that he was legally blind when playing without glasses. After securing a pair of contact lenses, Cooper earned the Battery's starting position in goal where he has remained through the 2015 season, when he was named the club's player of the year. The club re-signed him for the 2018 season.

== International career ==
Cooper made his international debut for Cuba in a December 2011 friendly match against Costa Rica and has earned a total of 7 caps in 2011 and 2012. He represented his country in 3 FIFA World Cup qualifying matches.

His final international was a September 2012 World Cup qualification match against Honduras. He defected with teammates Cordovés and Chang to the United States in October 2012 after leaving the national team in Toronto prior to a World Cup qualifier versus Canada.
