= Taylor Mueller =

American soccer player

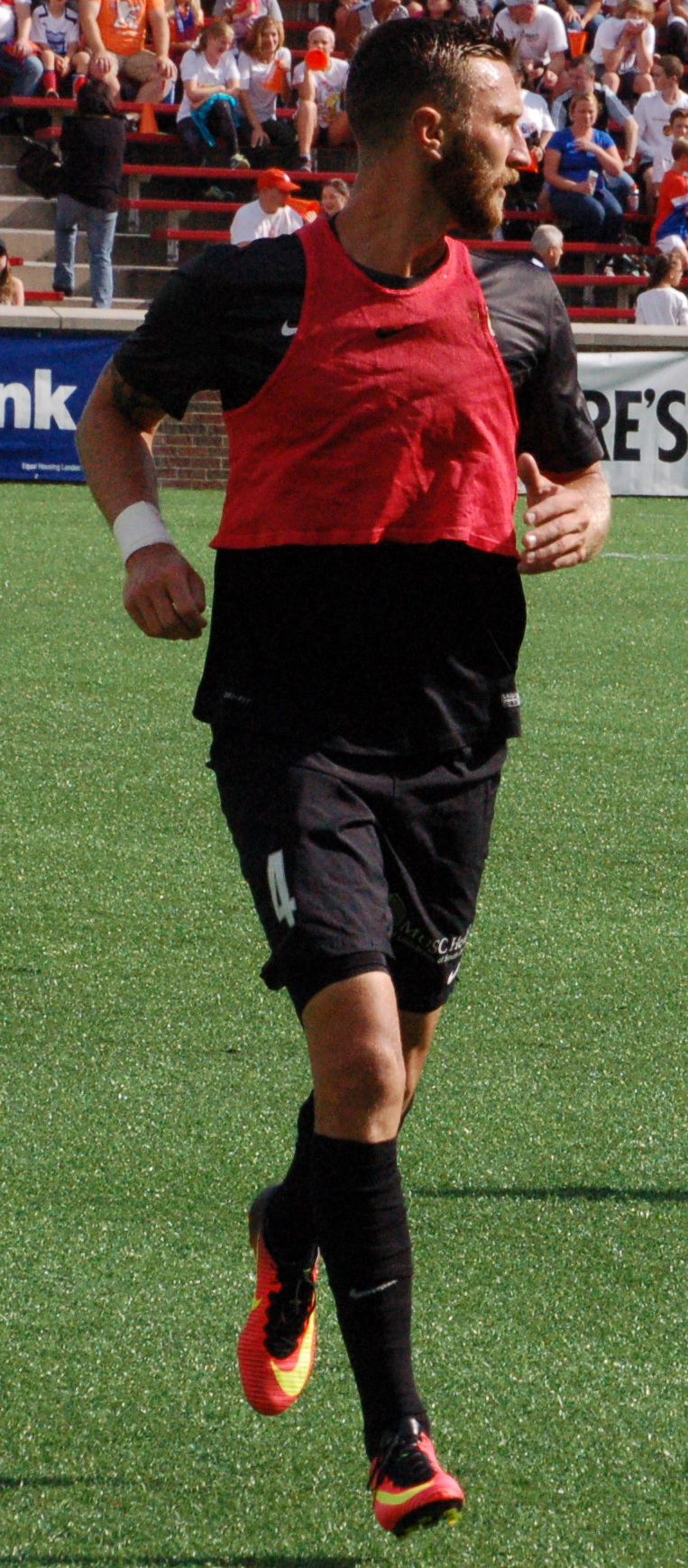
- Mueller playing for Charleston Battery in 2016

Personal information
- Full name: Taylor Thomas Mueller
- Date of birth: September 20, 1988 (age 38)
- Place of birth: Kirkland, Washington, United States
- Height: 6 ft 2 in (1.88 m)
- Position: Defender

College career
Years	Team	Apps	(Gls)
2007–2010	Washington Huskies		

Senior career*
Years	Team	Apps	(Gls)
2008	Tacoma Tide	10	(0)
2011	Washington Crossfire	9	(0)
2012–2019	Charleston Battery	203	(8)
2020–2021	Tacoma Defiance	41	(1)
Total		263	(9)
- * Club domestic league appearances and goals as of November 8, 2021

Taylor Thomas Mueller (born September 20, 1988, in Kirkland, Washington) is an American former professional soccer player.

== Career ==
Mueller played college soccer at the University of Washington between 2007 and 2010, where he made 72 appearances and scored 2 goals. During his time at Washington, Mueller was named UW's Defensive MVP, Second-Team NSCAA All-Far West Region, Second-Team All-Pac-10 in 2010, Third-Team NSCAA All-Far West Region, Second-Team All-Pac-10 in 2010 and was Second-team All-Pac-10 honoree in 2009.

During his time at Washington, Mueller also played with Tacoma Tide in the USL Premier Development League in 2008.

Mueller was drafted 38th overall in the 2011 MLS Supplemental Draft by Portland Timbers, but was not signed by the club.

During 2011, Mueller played with USL Premier Development League club Washington Crossfire, where he made 9 league appearances.

Mueller signed with USL Professional Division club Charleston Battery in March, 2012. He made his professional debut on April 7, coming on as a 75th-minute substitute in a 2–1 victory over Richmond Kickers.

On November 9, 2021, Mueller announced his retirement from playing professional soccer.
