= Dante Marini =

American soccer player

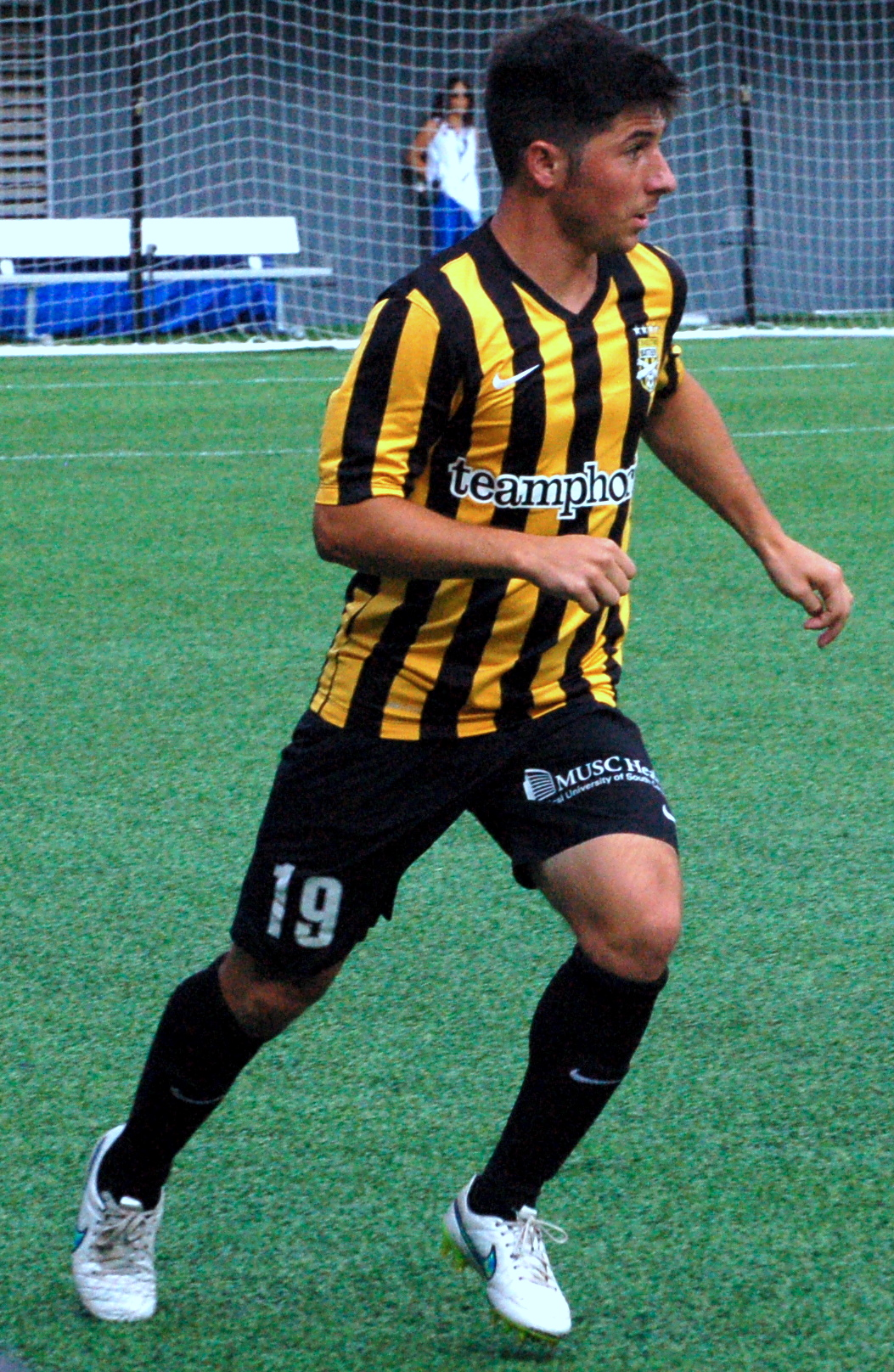
- Marini playing with Charleston Battery in 2016

Personal information
- Date of birth: July 21, 1992 (age 34)
- Place of birth: Chadds Ford, Pennsylvania, United States
- Height: 5 ft 3 in (1.60 m)
- Position: Midfielder

Team information
- Current team: Charleston Battery
- Number: 19

College career
Years	Team	Apps	(Gls)
2010–2013	Northeastern Huskies		

Senior career*
Years	Team	Apps	(Gls)
2012–2013	Reading United	19	(5)
2014–2020	Charleston Battery	115	(9)
- * Club domestic league appearances and goals as of October 5, 2020

Dante Marini (born July 21, 1992, in Chadds Ford, Pennsylvania) is an American former soccer player.

== Career ==
=== College and youth ===
Marini played four years of college soccer at Northeastern University from 2010 to 2013. While at college, Marini appeared for USL PDL club Reading United AC.

=== Professional ===
Marini signed his first professional deal with USL Pro club Charleston Battery in March 2014. In April 2021, Marini indicated his retirement from professional soccer with a post on social media.
