= Ricky Garbanzo =

Costa Rican-American soccer player (born 1992)

Personal information
- Full name: Ricardo Garbanzo
- Date of birth: August 26, 1992 (age 34)
- Place of birth: San Jose, Costa Rica
- Height: 1.70 m (5 ft 7 in)
- Position: Forward

Youth career
- 2011–2014: Coastal Carolina Chanticleers

Senior career*
Years	Team	Apps	(Gls)
2014	K-W United	12	(1)
2015–2017	Charleston Battery	79	(9)
- * Club domestic league appearances and goals as of October 17, 2017

Ricardo "Ricky" Garbanzo (born August 26, 1992) is a Costa Rican-American soccer player who last played for Charleston Battery in the USL.

== Career ==
=== College and amateur ===
Garbanzo moved to United States at age 7 and grew up in Rock Hill, South Carolina. Garbanzo played soccer at Northwestern High School with future Battery teammate Shawn Ferguson. Garbanzo played college soccer at Coastal Carolina University, making a total of 94 appearances for the Chanticleers and tallying 40 goals and 21 assists.

Garbanzo also played for K-W United FC in the Premier Development League.

=== Professional ===
On December 31, 2014, it was announced that Garbanzo would take part in Major League Soccer's player combine. However, he went undrafted in the 2015 MLS SuperDraft. Following the draft he joined his hometown club Charleston Battery for training camp and earned a professional contract in March.

On March 21, 2015, he made his professional debut for the Battery in a 3–2 victory over Toronto FC II. During his rookie season Garbanzo became a first choice starter as a second striker behind teammate Dane Kelly, tallying 5 goals and 5 assists in 27 league appearances. Garbanzo plays as a defensive forward and is known for his hard-working and aggressive style of play, with manager Mike Anhaeuser nicknaming Garbanzo "Tricky Ricky" for his clever running and ability to provoke opponents. Following the season he was voted the club's newcomer of the year by fans.

His contract was not renewed following the 2017 season.
