= Justin Portillo =

American soccer player (born 1992)

Personal information
- Full name: Justin Jose Portillo
- Date of birth: September 9, 1992 (age 34)
- Place of birth: New Orleans, Louisiana, United States
- Height: 1.67 m (5 ft 6 in)
- Position: Midfielder

Youth career
- Lafreniere SC

College career
Years	Team	Apps	(Gls)
2010–2013	Coastal Carolina Chanticleers	89	(10)

Senior career*
Years	Team	Apps	(Gls)
2010–2011	Baton Rouge Capitals	24	(1)
2012	Reading United	2	(0)
2013	K-W United FC	13	(1)
2014–2017	Charleston Battery	104	(18)
2018	Real Monarchs	32	(2)
2019–2021	Real Salt Lake	11	(0)
2019–2021	→ Real Monarchs (loan)	21	(3)
2022–2023	New Mexico United	65	(13)
2024	FC Tulsa	10	(1)
2024–2025	Sacramento Republic	27	(0)
- * Club domestic league appearances and goals as of October 30, 2025

Justin Jose Portillo (born September 9, 1992) is an American soccer player.

== Career ==
Portillo was raised in New Orleans and played at Coastal Carolina University, becoming the school's all-time leader in appearances.

Portillo signed a professional contract with USL Pro club Charleston Battery on March 19, 2014. He made his professional debut three days later in a 1–1 draw with Orlando City. At the end of the 2014 season, Portillo was voted the club's newcomer of the year after establishing himself as a key starter in central midfield.

After a season with USL side Real Monarchs, Portillo joined MLS side Real Salt Lake on February 26, 2019. Following the 2021 season, Portillo's contract option was declined by Salt Lake.

On December 18, 2021, Portillo joined USL Championship side New Mexico United ahead of their 2022 season. On May 31, 2022, Portillo was named USL Championship Player of the Week for Week 12 in recognition of his brace and assist against Phoenix Rising FC and his additional goal against Indy Eleven.

On November 22, 2023, it was announced that Portillo would join FC Tulsa for their 2024 season. Portillo scored one goal and added two assists in his time with the club.

Portillo transferred to Sacramento Republic on June 7, 2024.

== Honors ==
Real Monarchs

- USL Championship Champions: 2019
