= List of professional sports teams in Missouri =

Missouri is the 19th most populated state in the United States and has a rich history of professional sports.

== Active teams ==
=== Major league teams ===
Missouri is home to five major professional sports teams. Three of the teams are located in St. Louis and two are in Kansas City.

American football
League	Team	City	Stadium	Capacity
NFL	Kansas City Chiefs	Kansas City	GEHA Field at Arrowhead Stadium	76,416
Baseball
League	Team	City	Stadium	Capacity
MLB	Kansas City Royals	Kansas City	Kauffman Stadium	37,903
MLB	St. Louis Cardinals	St. Louis	Busch Stadium	44,383
Ice hockey
League	Team	City	Arena	Capacity
NHL	St. Louis Blues	St. Louis	Enterprise Center	18,096
Soccer
League	Team	City	Stadium	Capacity
MLS	St. Louis City SC	St. Louis	Energizer Park	22,423

=== Other professional sports teams ===
American football
League	Team	City	Stadium	Capacity
UFL	St. Louis BattleHawks	St. Louis	The Dome at America's Center	67,277
Baseball
League	Team	City	Stadium	Capacity
TL (AA)	Springfield Cardinals	Springfield	Route 66 Stadium	10,486
Ice hockey
League	Team	City	Arena	Capacity
ECHL	Kansas City Mavericks	Independence	Cable Dahmer Arena	5,800
Rodeo
League	Team	City	Arena	Capacity
PBR	Kansas City Outlaws	Kansas City	T-Mobile Center	17,544
PBR	Missouri Thunder	Springfield	Great Southern Bank Arena	10,542
Soccer
League	Team	City	Stadium	Capacity
MLSNP	Sporting Kansas City II	Kansas City	Swope Soccer Village	3,557
MLSNP	St. Louis City 2	St. Louis	Energizer Park	22,423
MASL	Kansas City Comets	Independence	Cable Dahmer Arena	5,800
MASL	St. Louis Ambush	St. Charles	Family Arena	9,643
NWSL	Kansas City Current	Kansas City	CPKC Stadium	11,500
NWSL-2	Kansas City Current II	Riverside	Riverside Stadium	2,000
Volleyball
League	Team	City	Stadium	Capacity
MLV	Kansas City Pro Volleyball	Kansas City	TBD	TBD

=== Map of cities with a professional sports team ===
Location with a professional sports team

== See also ==
- Sports in Missouri
