= Western Conference (USL Championship) =

Conference in USL Championship soccer

- League: USL Championship
- Sport: Soccer
- Founded: January 21, 2015
- No. of teams: 12
- Most recent champion: FC Tulsa (2025) (1st title)
- Most titles: Phoenix Rising FC (3 titles)

The Western Conference is one of two conferences in the USL Championship, the second level of men's club soccer in the United States.

== Current standings ==
Pos	Team	Pld	W	L	T	GF	GA	GD	Pts	Qualification
1	El Paso Locomotive FC	25	14	7	4	44	31	+13	46	Playoffs
2	New Mexico United	24	12	5	7	37	27	+10	43	Playoffs
3	Colorado Springs Switchbacks FC	25	11	9	5	40	37	+3	38	Playoffs
4	San Antonio FC	25	9	6	10	29	28	+1	37	Playoffs
5	Sacramento Republic FC	24	9	5	10	30	20	+10	37	Playoffs
6	FC Tulsa	24	10	7	7	29	23	+6	37	Playoffs
7	Lexington SC	25	11	10	4	43	30	+13	37	Playoffs
8	Orange County SC	25	9	7	9	34	40	−6	36	Playoffs
9	Las Vegas Lights FC	25	9	10	6	32	35	−3	33	
10	Phoenix Rising FC	25	8	8	9	35	35	0	33	
11	Oakland Roots SC	25	7	9	9	30	35	−5	30	
12	Monterey Bay FC	25	4	15	6	25	43	−18	18	

Updated to match(es) played on September 20, 2026. Source: USL Championship Standings
Rules for classification: 1) total wins against conference opponents; 2) goal differential against conference opponents; 3) goals scored against conference opponents; 4) head-to-head points against conference opponents; 5) points per game against conference opponents; 6) points per game against non-conference opponents; 7) fewest disciplinary points; 8) coin toss or drawing of lots

== Members ==
=== Current ===
Club	City	Stadium
Colorado Springs Switchbacks FC	Colorado Springs, Colorado	Weidner Field
El Paso Locomotive FC	El Paso, Texas	Southwest University Park
FC Tulsa	Tulsa, Oklahoma	ONEOK Field
Las Vegas Lights FC	Las Vegas, Nevada	Cashman Field
Lexington SC	Lexington, Kentucky	Lexington SC Stadium
Monterey Bay FC	Seaside, California	Cardinale Stadium
New Mexico United	Albuquerque, New Mexico	Isotopes Park
Oakland Roots SC	Oakland, California	Pioneer Stadium
Orange County SC	Irvine, California	Championship Stadium
Phoenix Rising FC	Phoenix, Arizona	Phoenix Rising Soccer Stadium
Sacramento Republic FC	Sacramento, California	Heart Health Park
San Antonio FC	San Antonio, Texas	Toyota Field

Locations of teams for the 2026 USL Championship season

== Conference Lineups ==
=== Clubs timeline ===
Conference Member Club moved to Eastern Conference Club playing in different league Former clubs

=== 2015 (12 teams) ===
- Arizona United SC
- Austin Aztex
- Colorado Springs Switchbacks
- LA Galaxy II
- Oklahoma City Energy
- Orange County Blues
- Portland Timbers 2
- Real Monarchs SLC
- Sacramento Republic
- Seattle Sounders 2
- Tulsa Roughnecks
- Vancouver Whitecaps 2

Changes from 2014: USL Pro expanded and was rebranded as simply USL; the round robin table was split into two conferences: Eastern and Western.

=== 2016 (15 teams) ===
- Arizona United SC
- Colorado Springs Switchbacks
- LA Galaxy II
- Oklahoma City Energy
- Orange County Blues
- Portland Timbers 2
- Real Monarchs SLC
- Rio Grande Valley FC Toros
- Sacramento Republic
- St. Louis FC
- San Antonio FC
- Seattle Sounders 2
- Swope Park Rangers
- Tulsa Roughnecks
- Vancouver Whitecaps 2

Changes from 2015: Rio Grande Valley FC Toros, the Swope Park Rangers and San Antonio FC were added as expansion franchises; Saint Louis FC moved in from the Eastern Conference; the Austin Aztex went on hiatus

=== 2017 (15 teams) ===
- Colorado Springs Switchbacks
- LA Galaxy II
- Oklahoma City Energy
- Orange County SC
- Phoenix Rising FC
- Portland Timbers 2
- Real Monarchs SLC
- Reno 1868 FC
- Rio Grande Valley FC Toros
- Sacramento Republic
- San Antonio FC
- Seattle Sounders 2
- Swope Park Rangers
- Tulsa Roughnecks
- Vancouver Whitecaps 2

Changes from 2016: Arizona United SC was renamed Phoenix Rising FC; the Orange County Blues was renamed Orange County SC; the Austin Aztex folded; Reno 1868 FC was added as an expansion franchise; Saint Louis FC moved out to the Eastern Conference

=== 2018 (17 teams) ===
- Colorado Springs Switchbacks
- Fresno FC
- Las Vegas Lights FC
- LA Galaxy II
- Oklahoma City Energy
- Orange County SC
- Phoenix Rising FC
- Portland Timbers 2
- Real Monarchs SLC
- Reno 1868 FC
- Rio Grande Valley FC Toros
- Sacramento Republic
- Saint Louis FC
- San Antonio FC
- Seattle Sounders 2
- Swope Park Rangers
- Tulsa Roughnecks

Changes from 2017: Fresno FC and Las Vegas Lights FC were added as expansion franchises; the Vancouver Whitecaps 2 folded; Saint Louis FC moved in from the Western Conference.

=== 2019 (18 teams) ===
- Austin Bold FC
- Colorado Springs Switchbacks
- El Paso Locomotive FC
- Fresno FC
- Las Vegas Lights FC
- LA Galaxy II
- New Mexico United
- Oklahoma City Energy
- Orange County SC
- Phoenix Rising FC
- Portland Timbers 2
- Real Monarchs SLC
- Reno 1868 FC
- Rio Grande Valley FC Toros
- Sacramento Republic
- San Antonio FC
- Tacoma Defiance
- Tulsa Roughnecks

Changes from 2018: Austin Bold FC, El Paso Locomotive FC and the New Mexico United were added as expansion franchises.; Saint Louis FC and the Swope Park Rangers moved out to the Eastern Conference; Seattle Sounders FC 2 rebranded as Tacoma Defiance.

=== 2020 (18 teams) ===
==== Group A (4 teams) ====
- Portland Timbers 2
- Reno 1868 FC
- Sacramento Republic
- Tacoma Defiance

==== Group B (5 teams) ====
- Las Vegas Lights FC
- LA Galaxy II
- Orange County SC
- Phoenix Rising FC
- San Diego Loyal SC

==== Group C (4 teams) ====
- Colorado Springs Switchbacks
- El Paso Locomotive FC
- New Mexico United
- Real Monarchs SLC

==== Group D (5 teams) ====
- Austin Bold FC
- Oklahoma City Energy
- Rio Grande Valley FC Toros
- San Antonio FC
- FC Tulsa

Changes from 2019: San Diego Loyal SC was added as an expansion franchise; the Tulsa Roughnecks were renamed FC Tulsa; Fresno FC was disbanded. In response to the COVID-19 pandemic the conference was split into four groups. Two groups of four and two groups of five.

=== 2021 (15 teams) ===
==== Mountain Division ====
- Austin Bold FC
- Colorado Springs Switchbacks
- El Paso Locomotive FC
- New Mexico United
- Real Monarchs SLC
- Rio Grande Valley FC Toros
- San Antonio FC

==== Pacific Division ====
- Las Vegas Lights FC
- LA Galaxy II
- Oakland Roots SC
- Orange County SC
- Phoenix Rising FC
- Sacramento Republic
- San Diego Loyal SC
- Tacoma Defiance

Changes from 2020: The conference was divided into two divisions, Mountain and Pacific; Oakland Roots SC joined in from NISA: the Portland Timbers 2 was withdrawn by the MLS parent club; Reno 1868 FC was disbanded; Oklahoma City Energy and FC Tulsa moved out to the Eastern Conference.

=== 2022 (13 teams) ===
- Colorado Springs Switchbacks
- El Paso Locomotive FC
- New Mexico United
- Monterey Bay FC
- Rio Grande Valley FC Toros
- Las Vegas Lights FC
- LA Galaxy II
- Oakland Roots SC
- Orange County SC
- Phoenix Rising FC
- Sacramento Republic FC
- San Antonio FC
- San Diego Loyal SC

Changes from 2021: The Mountain and Pacific divisions were dropped; Monterey Bay FC was added as an expansion franchise; the Real Monarchs and the Tacoma Defiance were withdrawn by their MLS parent clubs and moved to MLS Next Pro; Austin Bold FC went on hiatus; will move to a yet-to-be-named Texas city for the 2023 season.

=== 2023 (12 teams) ===
- Colorado Springs Switchbacks
- El Paso Locomotive FC
- New Mexico United
- Monterey Bay FC
- Rio Grande Valley FC Toros
- Las Vegas Lights FC
- Oakland Roots SC
- Orange County SC
- Phoenix Rising FC
- Sacramento Republic FC
- San Antonio FC
- San Diego Loyal SC

Changes from 2022: The LA Galaxy II was withdrawn by their MLS parent club and moved to MLS Next Pro;

=== 2024 (12 teams) ===
- Colorado Springs Switchbacks
- El Paso Locomotive FC
- FC Tulsa
- New Mexico United
- Monterey Bay FC
- Las Vegas Lights FC
- Memphis 901 FC
- Oakland Roots SC
- Orange County SC
- Phoenix Rising FC
- Sacramento Republic FC
- San Antonio FC

Changes from 2023: Rio Grande Valley FC Toros and San Diego Loyal SC folded. FC Tulsa and Memphis 901 FC moved from the Eastern Conference.

=== 2025-2026 (12 teams) ===
- Colorado Springs Switchbacks FC
- El Paso Locomotive FC
- FC Tulsa
- Lexington SC
- Las Vegas Lights FC
- Monterey Bay FC
- New Mexico United
- Oakland Roots SC
- Orange County SC
- Phoenix Rising FC
- Sacramento Republic FC
- San Antonio FC

Changes from 2024: Lexington SC joined from USL League One. Memphis 901 FC folded.

== Western Conference Playoff champions by year ==
**Bold**	USL Champions

Season	Champions	Score	Runners up
2015	LA Galaxy II	2–1	OKC Energy FC
2016	Swope Park Rangers	3–0	Vancouver Whitecaps FC 2
2017	Swope Park Rangers	0–0 (7–6 PK)	OKC Energy FC
2018	Phoenix Rising FC	2–1	Orange County SC
2019	**Real Monarchs SLC**	2–1 (AET)	El Paso Locomotive FC
2020 (Note: USL Championship game canceled due to COVID-19 outbreak in the Tampa Bay Rowdies camp.)	Phoenix Rising FC	1–1 (4–2 PK)	El Paso Locomotive FC
2021	**Orange County SC**	1–1 (5–3 PK)	San Antonio FC
2022	**San Antonio FC**	2–0	Colorado Springs Switchbacks
2023	**Phoenix Rising FC**	2–1	Sacramento Republic FC
2024	**Colorado Springs Switchbacks**	1–0	Las Vegas Lights FC
2025	**FC Tulsa**	3–0	New Mexico United

== Western Conference regular season champions by year ==
**Bold**	Players' Shield Champions

Season	Team	Record	Playoffs result
2015	Orange County Blues	14–9–5 (+4)	Lost conference semifinals
2016	Sacramento Republic FC	14–10–6 (+16)	Lost conference quarterfinals
2017	**Real Monarchs SLC**	20–5–7 (+28)	Lost conference quarterfinals
2018	Orange County SC	20–8–6 (+30)	Lost conference final
2019	**Phoenix Rising FC**	24–4–6 (+53)	Lost conference semifinals
2020	**Reno 1868 FC**	11–2–3 (+22)	Lost conference semifinals
2021	Phoenix Rising FC	20–5–7 (+33)	Lost conference quarterfinals
2022	**San Antonio FC**	24–5–5 (+28)	Won **USL Championship**
2023	Sacramento Republic FC	18–6–10 (+25)	Lost conference final
2024	New Mexico United	18–11–5 (+2)	Lost conference semifinals
2025	FC Tulsa	16–9–5 (+20)	Lost finals

== See also ==
- Eastern Conference (USL Championship)
