= USL Premier =

Proposed men's soccer league in the United States

- United Soccer League wordmark
- Organizing body: United Soccer League
- First season: 2028 (proposed)
- Country: United States
- Confederation: CONCACAF
- Number of clubs: 12 (proposed)
- Level on pyramid: Division 1 (proposed)
- Relegation to: USL Championship
- Domestic cup: U.S. Open Cup
- League cup: USL Cup
- International cup: CONCACAF; Champions Cup

USL Premier is a proposed professional men's soccer league in the highest level of the United States league system, alongside Major League Soccer. Organized by the United Soccer League (USL), it would supersede the USL Championship as its premier league for men, and would employ a promotion and relegation system with the Championship. Its inaugural season would commence by 2028.

== History ==
The USL announced its intent to establish a new Division 1 league via a press release published in February 2025. USL clubs were informed of the decision the day prior. Before making their announcement, the USL waited for the outcome of N. Am. Soccer League, LLC v. U.S. Soccer Fed'n, Inc. in the United States District Court, E.D.N.Y., which ultimately ruled that U.S. Soccer's league system was legal and did not break antitrust laws. The USL aims to commence play in USL Premier in the 2028 season.

== Format ==
USL Premier would play a spring-to-fall schedule, and its teams would sign players via transfers and free agency; a college draft would not be used, comparable to most association football leagues outside of the United States. A system of promotion and relegation would be implemented, in which the worst-performing teams in the Premier would be replaced by the best-performing teams in the USL Championship at the end of each season.

== Organization ==
USL Premier will be led by Tony Scholes, the English Premier League's director of football, as its president.

== Teams ==
U.S. Soccer's Professional League Standards stipulate that a league must have a minimum of twelve teams to qualify for Division 1 sanctioning, and fourteen teams by its third season. The league must have teams situated in the Eastern, Central, and Pacific time zones, and at least three quarters of the teams must be based in metropolitan areas with a population of 1 million or more. All clubs must play in a venue with a capacity of 15,000 or more, and have an ownership group with a combined net worth of US$70 million. An individual owner with a net worth of US$40 million must also have a 35% or greater stake in the club.

Atlético Dallas, Louisville City FC, North Carolina FC, Pittsburgh Riverhounds SC, and Sporting Club Jacksonville have applied to join. An upgrade of F.N.B. Stadium to meet the stadium capacity requirement was put forward as the centerpiece of the Riverhounds' bid. North Carolina FC owner Steve Malik said his team has specific sites for a new stadium under consideration, as the team's current stadium at WakeMed Soccer Park does not meet the capacity requirement. Sporting Club Jacksonville announced the submission of an application to join USL Premier at the introductory press conference for their men's head coach, Liam Fox, though their stadium does not yet meet the stadium capacity requirement.

Detroit City FC and Sacramento Republic FC have also initiated stadium projects with an intent to meet the capacity requirement. Birmingham Legion FC, Miami FC, Oakland Roots SC and Louisville City currently meet both the market population and capacity requirements. The USL is also open to applications from clubs outside of its system.

List of applicant clubs
Team	Location	Stadium	Capacity	Ref.
Atlético Dallas	Dallas, Texas	Cotton Bowl	92,100	
Louisville City FC	Louisville, Kentucky	Lynn Family Stadium	15,304	
North Carolina FC	Raleigh, North Carolina	TBD	TBD	
Pittsburgh Riverhounds SC	Pittsburgh, Pennsylvania	F.N.B. Stadium	15,000 (planned)	
Sporting Club Jacksonville	Jacksonville, Florida	Hodges Stadium	12,000	
