= USL Championship =

American association football league

- Organizing body: United Soccer League
- First season: 2011
- Country: United States
- Confederation: CONCACAF
- Conferences: Eastern; Western
- Number of clubs: 25
- Level on pyramid: 2
- Promotion to: USL Premier (starting 2028)
- Relegation to: USL League One (starting 2028)
- Domestic cup: U.S. Open Cup
- League cup: USL Cup
- Current champion(s): Sacramento; Republic FC (2026)
- Current Players' Shield: Tampa Bay Rowdies (2026)
- Most championships: Louisville City FC; Orlando City SC; Sacramento Republic FC (2 each)
- Most Players' Shields: Orlando City SC (3)
- Broadcasters: CBS Sports; ESPN
- Website: uslchampionship.com
- Current: 2026 USL Championship season

The USL Championship (USLC) is a men's professional soccer league in the second tier of the United States league system. It is organized by the United Soccer League (USL) as its premier league for men above USL League One. Operating under a franchise model, 25 teams divided between the league's Eastern and Western conferences compete in an annual round-robin regular season, lasting from spring to fall. At the end of the season, the top team overall wins the Players' Shield, while the top eight teams in each conference advance to a playoff tournament culminating in the USL Championship final, which determines the champion. The league's teams also simultaneously compete in the U.S. Open Cup and USL Cup.

Playing its first season in 2011 as USL Pro, and later the USL, the league formed from the merger of the USL's preceding two pro leagues, after a number of clubs broke away to establish the North American Soccer League. It was initially sanctioned by U.S. Soccer as a third-tier league, but was later promoted to the second tier in 2017. Reserve teams of Major League Soccer (MLS) franchises also competed in the league from 2014 to the advent of MLS Next Pro in 2022. The Championship adopted its current name following the re-establishment of a second pro league in 2019. A third pro league, USL Premier, is currently being planned to supersede the Championship as the USL's top league.

As of the 2026 season, Sacramento Republic FC are the current champions, while Louisville City FC and Orlando City SC have won the most championships each (2). The current Players' Shield holders are the Tampa Bay Rowdies, while Orlando City SC has won the most Players' Shields (3). Three former USL Championship teams – Orlando City SC, FC Cincinnati, and Nashville SC – are now MLS franchises. Notable players such as Joe Cole, Didier Drogba, Brian McBride, Tim Howard and Rob Kiernan have all played in this league

== History ==
=== Founding and first seasons (2010–2012) ===
Logo of USL Pro – the competition's original name from 2011 to 2014.

The USL Championship traces its origins to September 2010, when the USL announced the merger of its First and Second Division into the USL Pro, a new league with Division III status granted by U.S. Soccer. The first announced teams were the five remaining Second Division clubs – the Charleston Battery, Charlotte Eagles, Harrisburg City Islanders, Pittsburgh Riverhounds, and Richmond Kickers; alongside were the Austin Aztex, the lone surviving First Division club, who joined as Orlando City SC after relocating to Orlando, Florida, and a reactivated Wilmington Hammerheads, who last played in the Second Division.

USL Pro charter clubs
American Division
- Charleston Battery
- Charlotte Eagles
- Orlando City SC
- Richmond Kickers
- Wilmington Hammerheads
National Division
- Dayton Dutch Lions
- F.C. New York
- Harrisburg City Islanders
- Pittsburgh Riverhounds
- Rochester Rhinos
International Division
- Antigua Barracuda FC
- Los Angeles Blues
- Puerto Rico United
- River Plate Puerto Rico
- Sevilla FC Puerto Rico

Current members (2026)
Pittsburgh Riverhounds SC
Orange County SC (LA Blues)

USL President Tim Holt initially hoped to launch USL Pro with 14-20 across four conferences. To that end, the league added the Dayton Dutch Lions, then a Premier Development League (PDL) team, and the Rochester Rhinos, who abandoned plans to defect from the USL to the NASL. The league also recruited the Puerto Rico Soccer League's (PRSL) Puerto Rico United, River Plate Puerto Rico, and Sevilla FC Puerto Rico; and the Antigua Barracuda and Los Angeles Blues to form an "International" division for the inaugural 2011 season, while the nine existing USL clubs and expansion team, F.C. New York were divided into the "American" and "National" divisions.

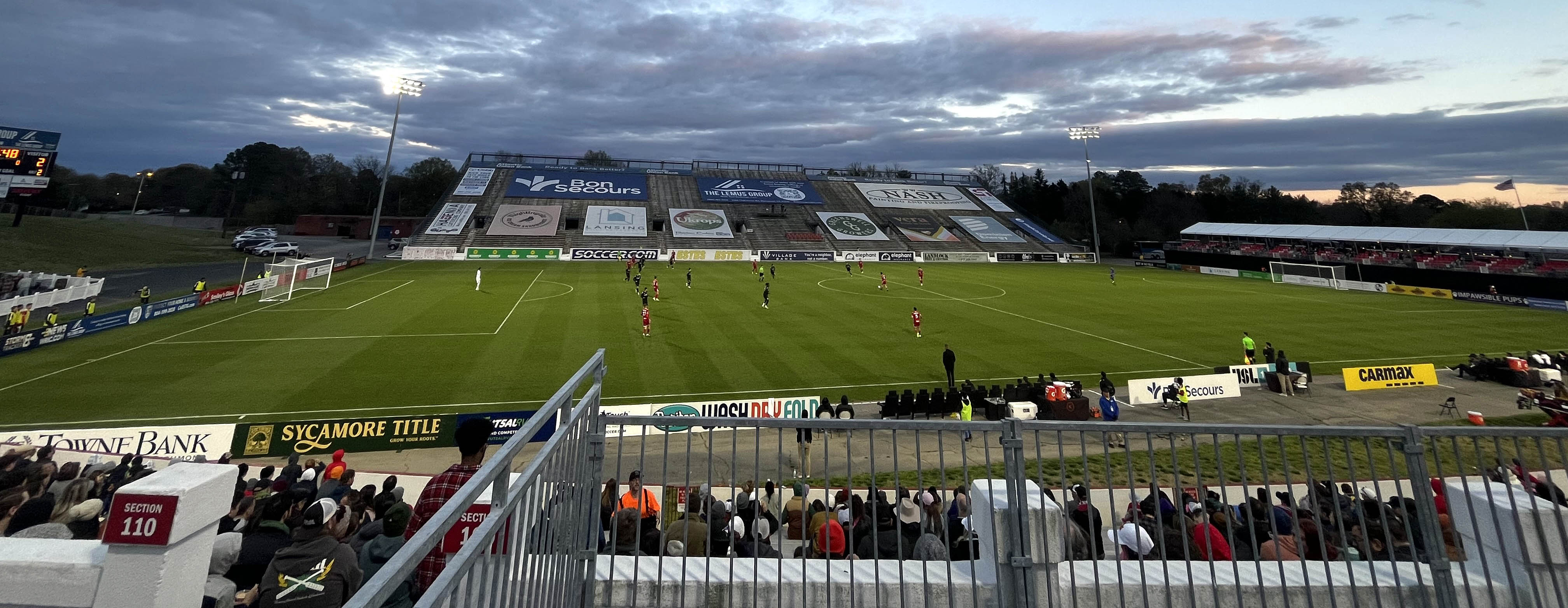
The first match, a Richmond Kickers home game, took place at City Stadium (pictured) in April 2011.

The league's first match took place on April 2, 2011, at City Stadium in Richmond, Virginia, where the Kickers defeated Orlando City and Stanley Nyazamba scored the league's first goal. Financial issues plagued the three PRSL clubs, leading to their expulsion five weeks into the season and the abolishment of the International division. F.C New York, also beset by financial issues, departed for the National Premier Soccer League at the end of the season. As a result, the American and National divisions were replaced by a single eleven-team table for the 2012 season, during which the Battery won the title.

=== MLS partnership and expansion (2013–2016) ===
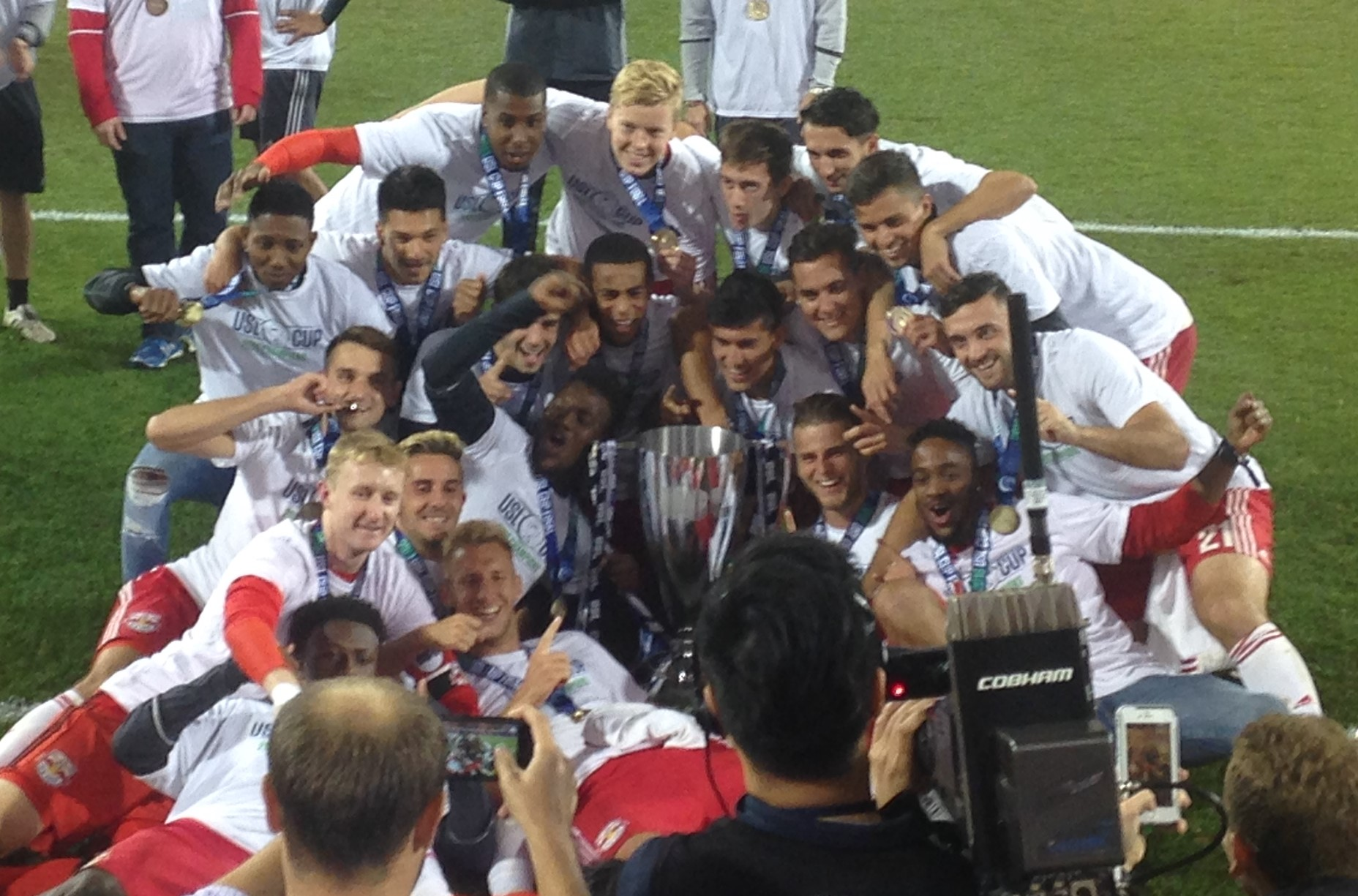
Reserve teams fielded by MLS clubs, such as 2016 champions New York Red Bulls II (pictured), populated the league from 2014 to 2022.

Beginning in the 2013 season, affiliations with Major League Soccer (MLS) clubs began as part of a partnership that aimed to improve "player development, competition and the overall business" of American soccer, according to MLS executive Todd Durbin. The LA Galaxy pioneered the model in 2014 by founding a standalone reserve team rather than affiliating with a USL club, and seven more MLS clubs followed suit in 2015 amid the demise of the MLS Reserve League. Sacramento Republic FC illustrated the league's growing commercial potential, winning the league and nearly doubling the average attendance record in their 2014 debut.

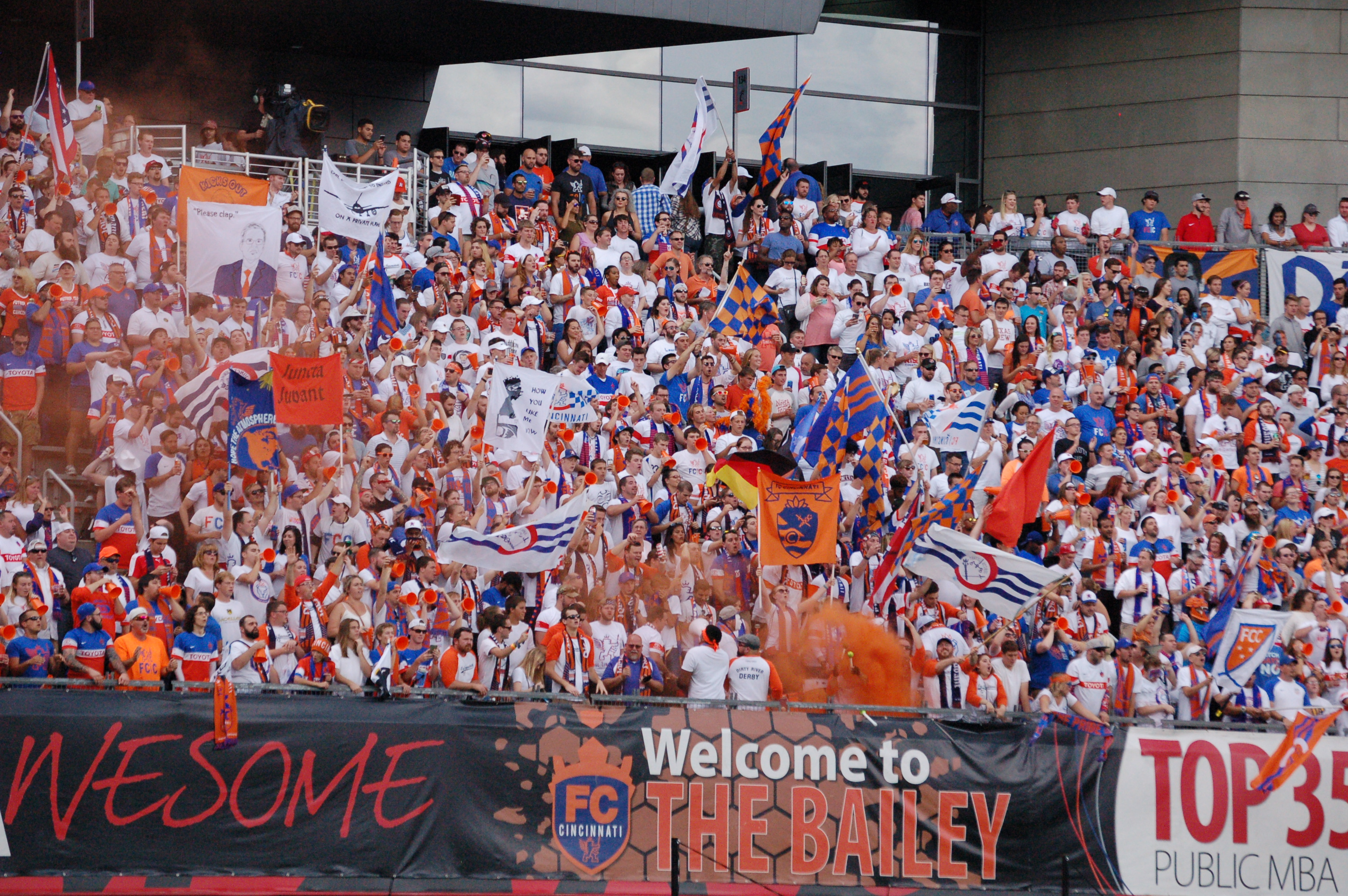
FC Cincinnati (pictured) repeatedly broke attendance records during their tenure in the USL from 2016 to 2018.

As the Championship grew to 24 teams, the USL dropped "Pro" from its name, and introduced the "Eastern" and "Western" conferences to the league. It also applied for Division 2 status in 2015. Three more MLS reserve teams entered in the 2016 season alongside San Antonio FC, MLS expansion bidders FC Cincinnati, and Rio Grande Valley FC Toros – a "hybrid" club with independent ownership, but managed by the MLS's Houston Dynamo FC. Cincinnati broke the all-time USL record for single-match attendance three times in its inaugural season, with the highest being 24,376, while New York Red Bulls II became the first MLS reserve team to win a USL title.

=== D2 status, NASL demise, and restructure (2017–2019) ===
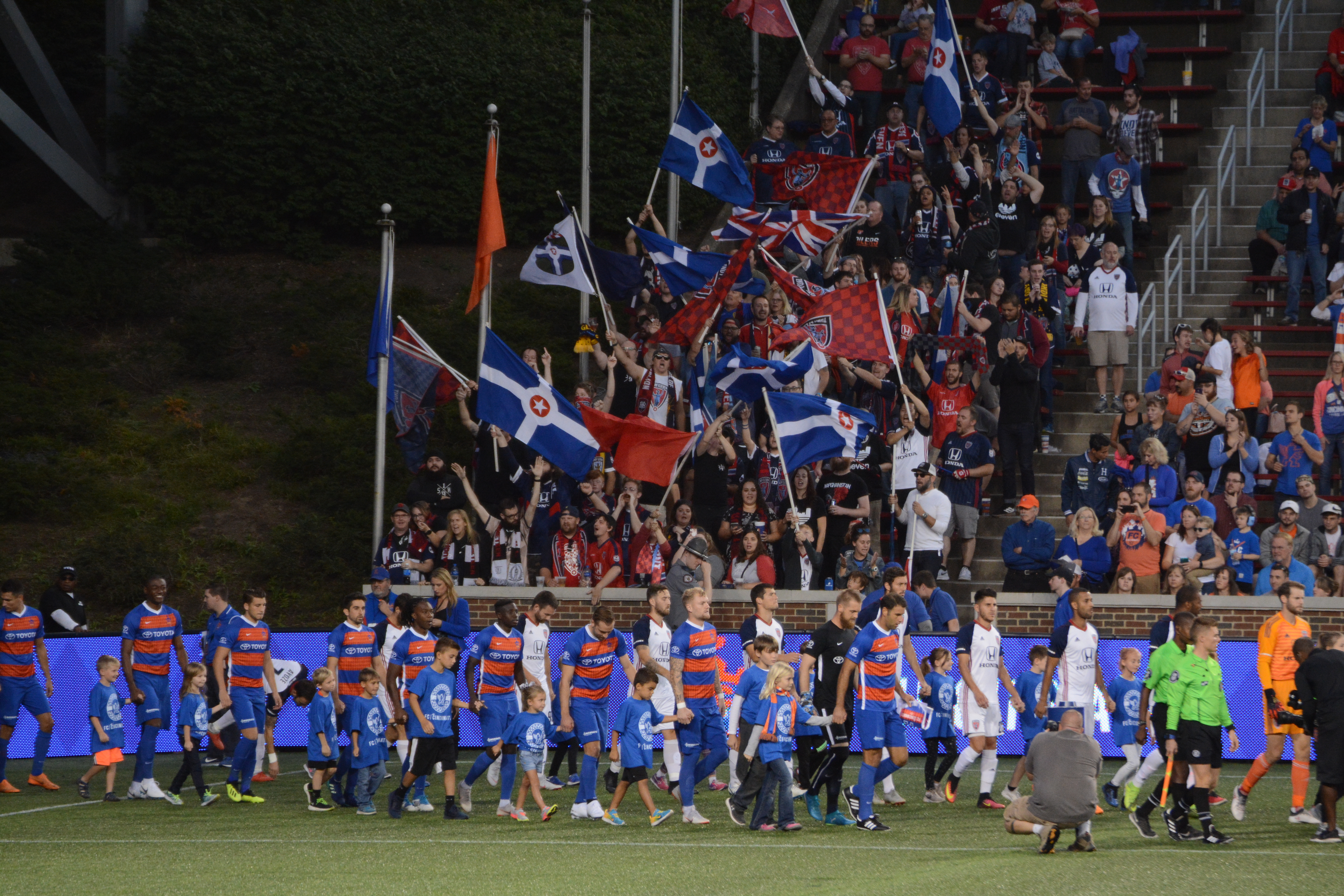
Indy Eleven (pictured) were one of four NASL clubs to join the USL amid its collapse during 2017 and 2018.

The USL's rise to Division 2 status was accelerated by the collapse of the rival North American Soccer League. Seeking to stem financial losses incurred while playing in the NASL, the Ottawa Fury and Tampa Bay Rowdies defected to the USL ahead of the 2017 season, dropping the NASL membership below the twelve required for D2 status. U.S. Soccer responded by awarding provisional D2 status to both the NASL and USL, but for the 2018 season, the USL gained full D2 status, while the NASL was stripped of theirs. A preliminary injunction against the decision was denied, leading to the NASL's collapse and its clubs scattering, two of whom – Indy Eleven and North Carolina FC – joined the USL.

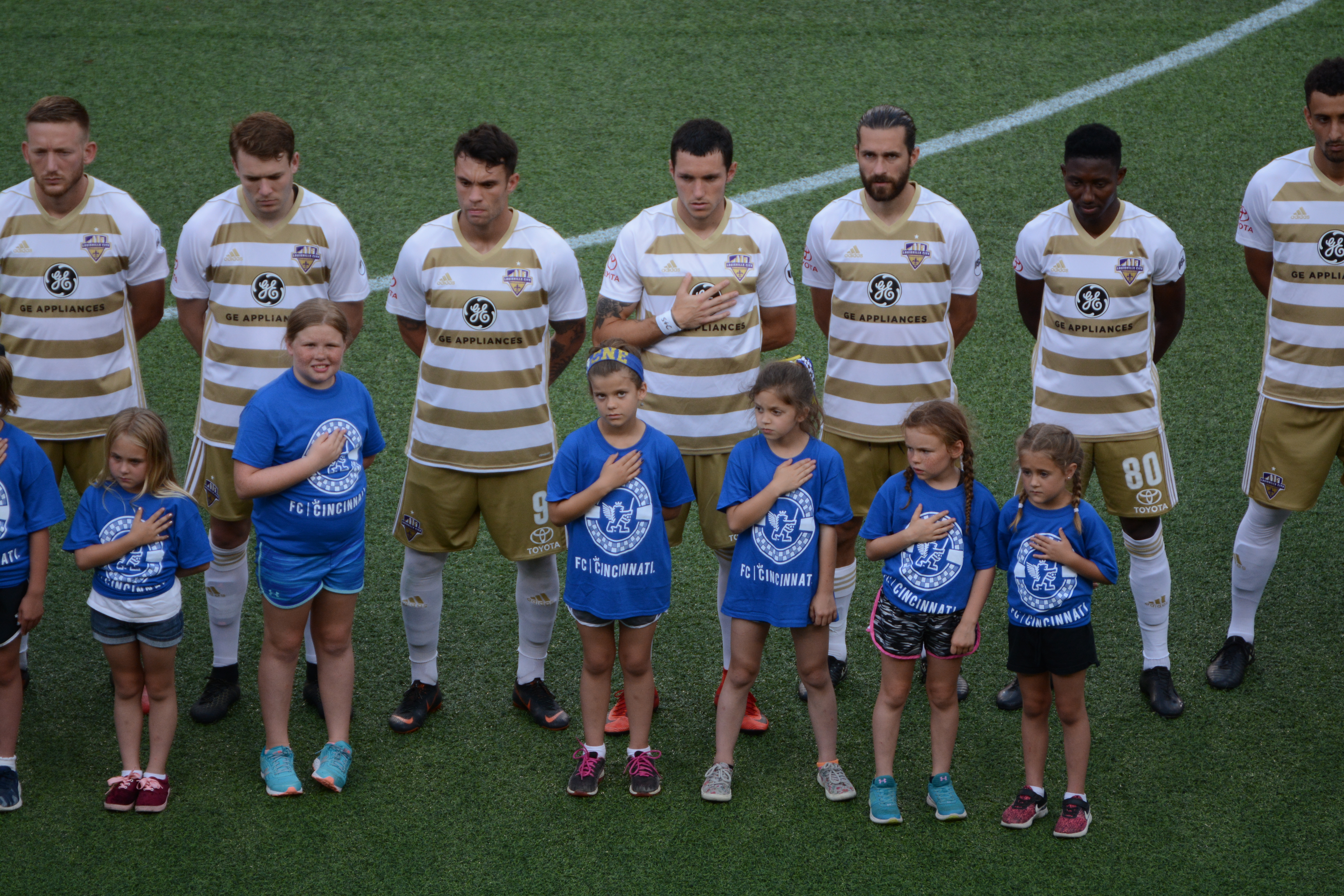
Louisville City FC (pictured) won two consecutive championships in 2017 and 2018.

Arizona United SC rebranded as Phoenix Rising FC, following its sale to an ownership group that included Premier League Hall of Famer Didier Drogba, who also signed for the club. Louisville City won back-to-back championships in 2017 and 2018, the latter by defeating the Rising in Drogba's final professional game. Cincinnati's final season set all-time USL records for single-match attendance (31,478), average attendance (25,717), and total attendance (437,197).

In 2019, the USL was split into the USL Championship (top) and USL League One (bottom).

The USL returned to a two-division structure in the 2019 season. It rebranded its second division league as the USL Championship and introduced a new third division league, called USL League One, beneath it. Several clubs moved down to the third-division league in 2019, including the Richmond Kickers and the Rochester Rhinos, while a new wave of expansion clubs joined the Championship, among them New Mexico United who set the attendance record that season. Nashville SC, having used the USL as a launchpad for a successful MLS bid, became the 7th Championship club to depart for the MLS in 2020.

=== COVID-19 and the MLS exit (2020–2022) ===
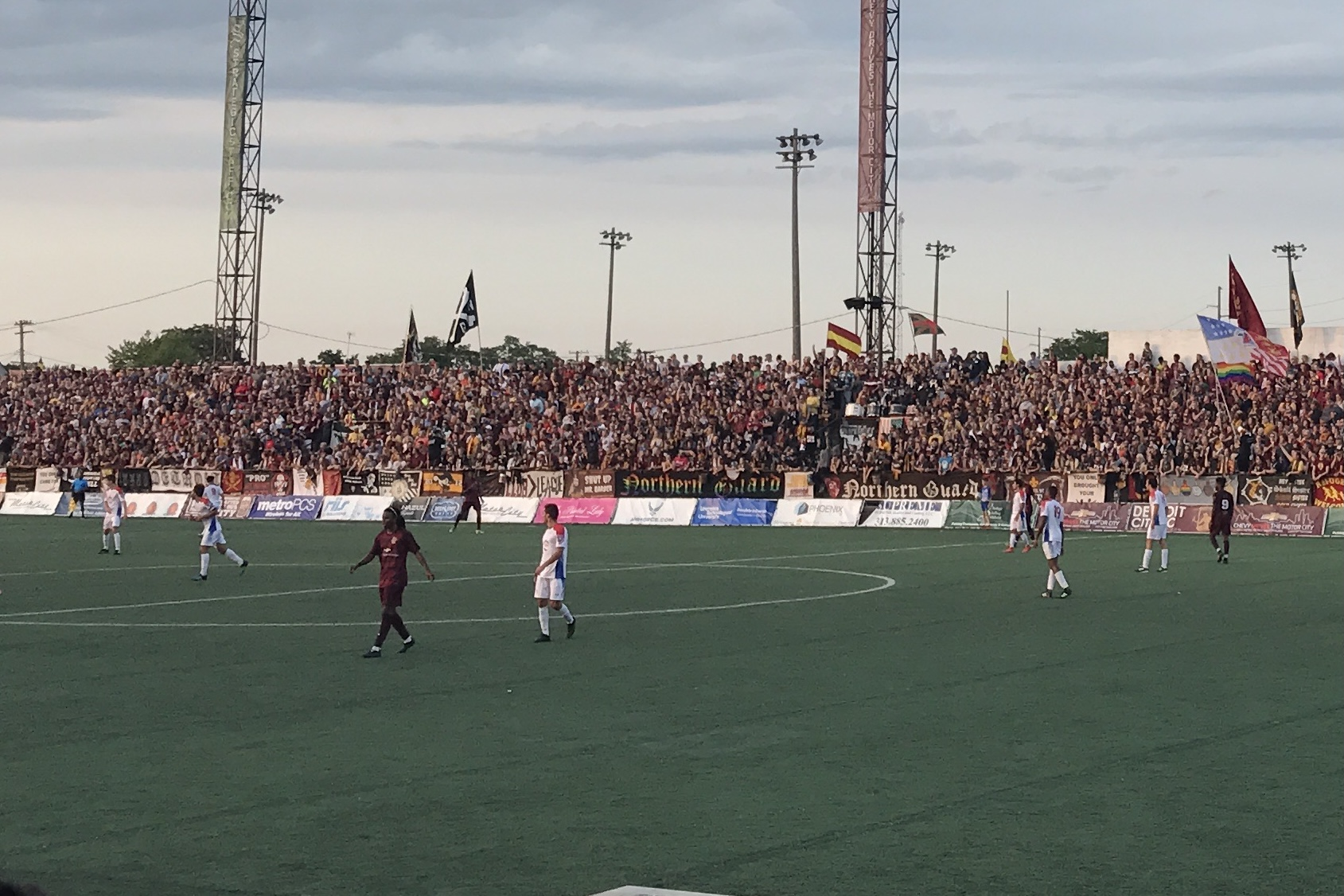
Detroit City FC (pictured) was one of three NISA clubs to join the USL Championship in a span of three seasons, along with Miami and Oakland.

The COVID-19 pandemic brought significant disruption to the league. Reno 1868 FC ceased operations in November 2020 citing the financial and operational impacts of COVID-19, while Saint Louis FC folded at the end of the same season, with ownership citing both COVID-19 and the impending arrival of MLS expansion side St. Louis City SC as a factor. Despite the disruption of COVID-19, the league continued to grow, including the additions of Miami FC, Oakland Roots SC, and Detroit City FC, three former NISA clubs across three successive seasons.

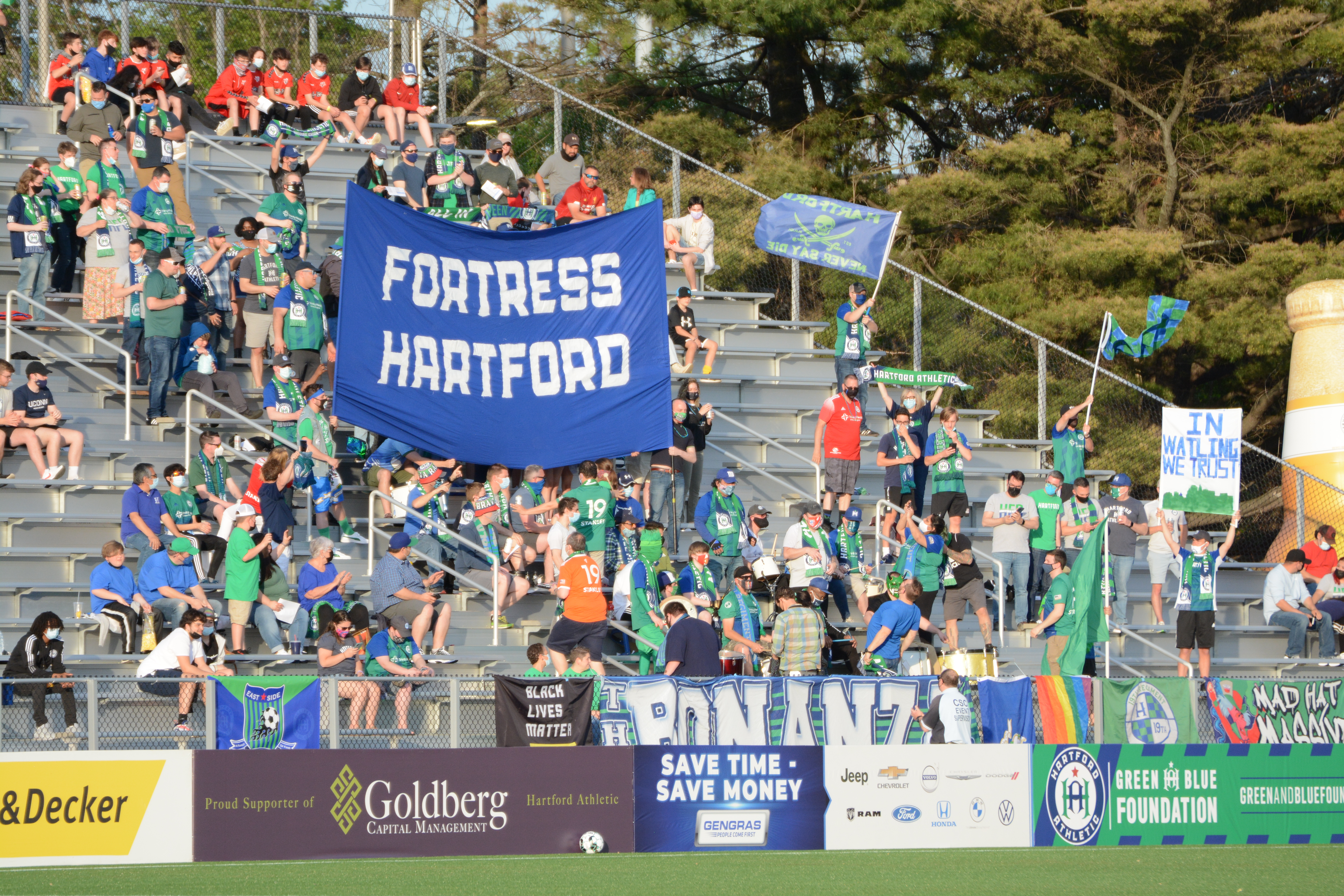
Despite the COVID-19 pandemic, the league and its clubs (Hartford Athletic pictured) continued to experience rapid growth.

Two MLS clubs, the Philadelphia Union and Portland Timbers, withdrew their reserve sides, Philadelphia Union II and Portland Timbers 2, from the United Soccer League system in 2020. The MLS-USL partnership that started in 2014 came to a formal end the following year, when on December 6, 2021, Major League Soccer announced MLS Next Pro, a Division III league that would begin play in 2022. All MLS clubs with reserve teams in USL Championship or USL League One would be moving their affiliated teams to MLS Next Pro by 2023, except for Loudoun United FC (although under different ownership).

=== Potential CBA strike and recent history (2023–present) ===
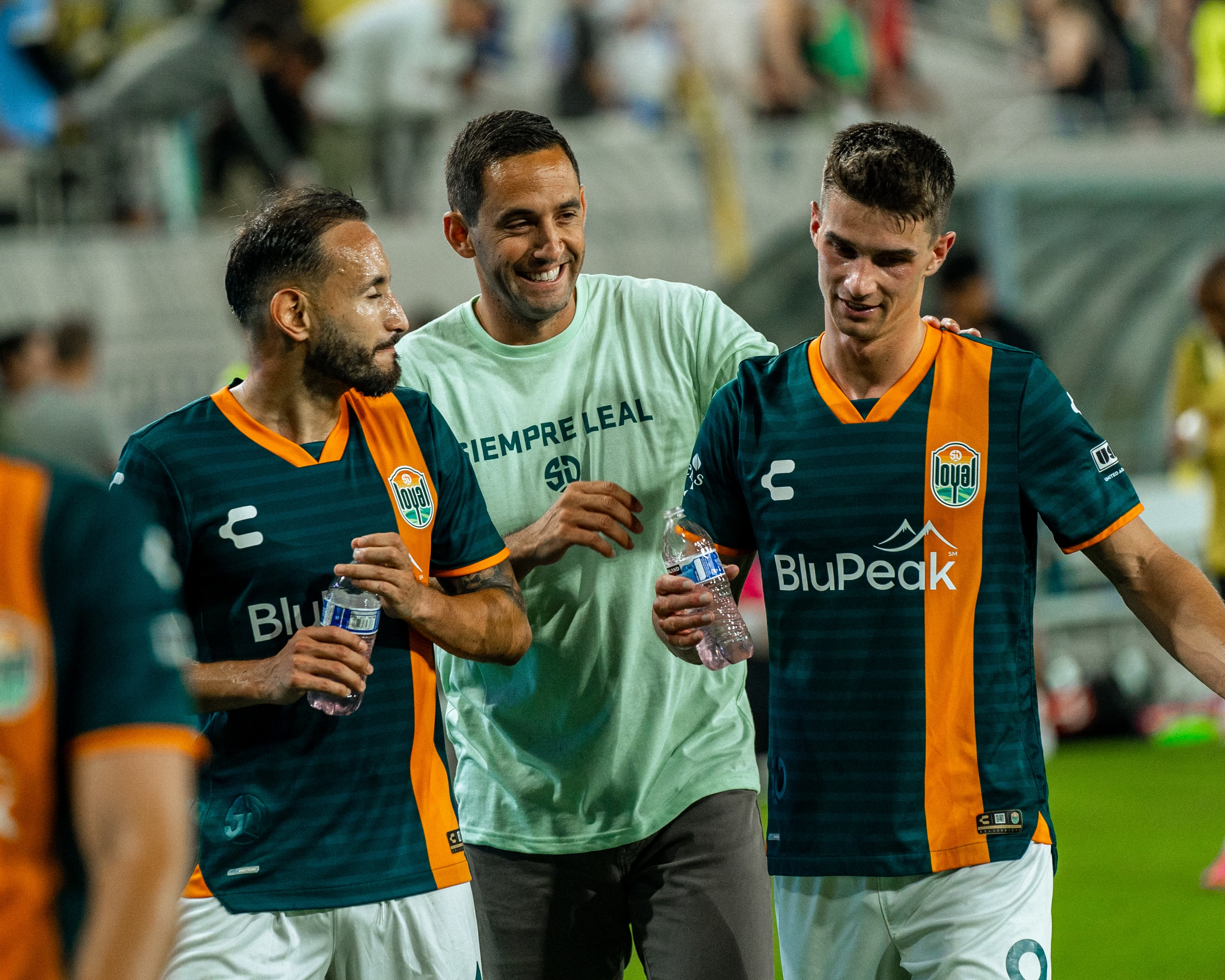
The San Diego Loyal SC (pictured) were one of a handful of teams in the USL Championship affected by MLS expansion.

MLS expansion continued to reshape the league's membership, where San Diego Loyal SC shut down after 2023 for lack of a permanent stadium in a market the MLS had targeted for expansion, with San Diego FC beginning play in 2025.

In February 2025, the USL announced its intent to establish a new Division I league USL Premier, to launch in 2028 atop the USL's men's league structure. This would place the Championship at the center of the USL's three tier professional pyramid, connected by promotion and relegation to USL Premier above and USL League One below. Brooklyn FC and Sporting Jax both added men's sides for the 2026 season, while North Carolina FC went on hiatus as owner Steve Malik sought a new stadium that would meet D1 requirements to restart the club in that league.

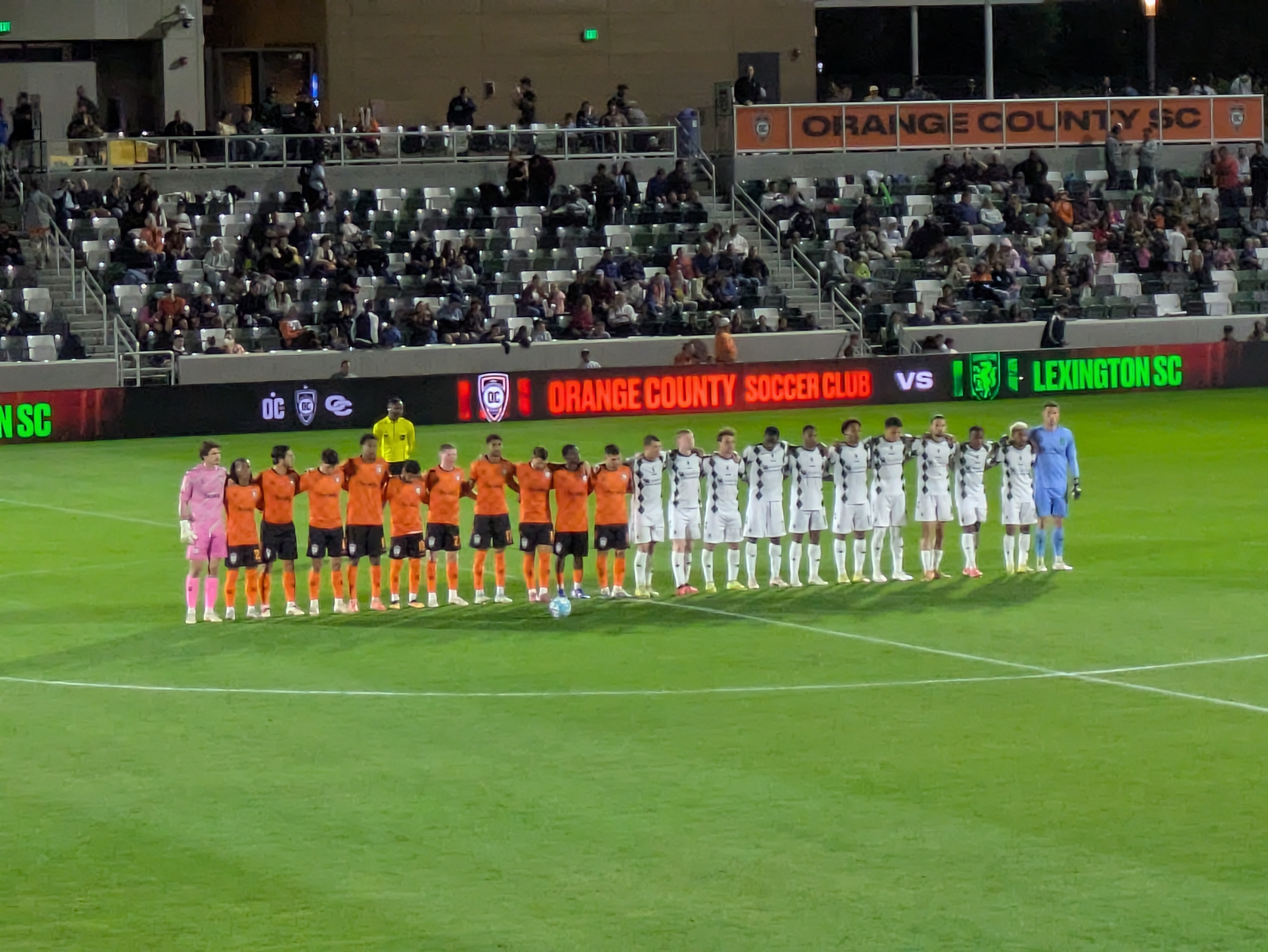
Mid-match protest by Orange County SC and Lexington SC players in April 2026, a protest that all teams participated in until a new CBA was finally agreed upon mid-season by the USL front office.

The 2026 season was also threatened by a labor dispute, as the player's association and USL owners could not come to an agreement on a new collective bargaining agreement (CBA) before the previous one expired at the end of 2025. The players association authorized a potential players' strike in early February 2026 as talks stalled before the season began, and the USL front office faced accusations of union busting after emailing players information on how to quit the players association and cross picket lines days before the season began. Although a strike was never called, players staged in-match protests each week, refusing to play for one minute at the beginning of every half. An agreement on a CBA running through 2030 was finally reached in May 2026, ending the player protests.

== Teams ==
Locations of Western and Eastern Conference teams, and future teams

The following teams are playing in the 2026 season.

Overview of USL Championship teams
| Conference | Team | City | Stadium | Capacity | Founded | Joined | Head coach |
|---|---|---|---|---|---|---|---|
| Eastern Conference | Birmingham Legion FC | Birmingham, Alabama | Protective Stadium (Note: Shared facility; not a soccer-specific stadium) | 47,100 | 2017 | 2019 | (United States) Jay Heaps |
| Eastern Conference | Brooklyn FC | Brooklyn, New York City, New York | Maimonides Park (Note: Baseball park) | 7,000 | 2023 | 2026 | (United States) Marlon LeBlanc |
| Eastern Conference | Charleston Battery | Mount Pleasant, South Carolina | Patriots Point (Note: Soccer-specific stadium) | 3,900 | 1993 | 2011 | (United States) Ben Pirmann |
| Eastern Conference | Detroit City FC | Hamtramck, Michigan | Keyworth Stadium | 7,933 | 2012 | 2022 | (England) Danny Dichio |
| Eastern Conference | Hartford Athletic | Hartford, Connecticut | Trinity Health Stadium | 5,500 | 2018 | 2019 | (United States) Brendan Burke |
| Eastern Conference | Indy Eleven | Indianapolis, Indiana | Carroll Stadium | 10,524 | 2013 | 2018 | (England) Sean McAuley |
| Eastern Conference | Loudoun United FC | Leesburg, Virginia | Segra Field | 5,000 | 2018 | 2019 | (Australia) Anthony Limbrick |
| Eastern Conference | Louisville City FC | Louisville, Kentucky | Lynn Family Stadium | 15,304 | 2014 | 2015 | (England) Simon Bird (interim) |
| Eastern Conference | Miami FC | University Park, Florida | Pitbull Stadium | 20,000 | 2015 | 2020 | (Argentina) Gastόn Maddoni |
| Eastern Conference | Pittsburgh Riverhounds SC | Pittsburgh, Pennsylvania | F.N.B. Stadium | 5,000 | 1998 | 2011 | (England) Rob Vincent |
| Eastern Conference | Rhode Island FC | Pawtucket, Rhode Island | Centreville Bank Stadium | 10,500 | 2019 | 2024 | (Bermuda) Khano Smith |
| Eastern Conference | Sporting Club Jacksonville | Jacksonville, Florida | Hodges Stadium | 12,000 | 2022 | 2026 | (Scotland) Liam Fox |
| Eastern Conference | Tampa Bay Rowdies | St. Petersburg, Florida | Al Lang Stadium | 7,227 | 2008 | 2017 | (England) Dominic Casciato |
| Western Conference | Colorado Springs Switchbacks FC | Colorado Springs, Colorado | Weidner Field | 8,000 | 2013 | 2015 | (Republic of Ireland) Alan McCann |
| Western Conference | El Paso Locomotive FC | El Paso, Texas | Southwest University Park | 9,500 | 2018 | 2019 | (United States) Junior Gonzalez |
| Western Conference | Las Vegas Lights FC | Las Vegas, Nevada | Cashman Field | 9,334 | 2017 | 2018 | (United States) Devin Rensing |
| Western Conference | Lexington SC | Lexington, Kentucky | Lexington SC Stadium | 7,500 | 2021 | 2025 | (Japan) Masaki Hemmi |
| Western Conference | Monterey Bay FC | Seaside, California | Cardinale Stadium | 6,000 | 2021 | 2022 | (England) Jordan Stewart |
| Western Conference | New Mexico United | Albuquerque, New Mexico | Isotopes Park | 13,500 | 2018 | 2019 | (United States) Dennis Sanchez |
| Western Conference | Oakland Roots SC | Oakland, California | Oakland Coliseum | 15,000 | 2018 | 2021 | (United States) Ryan Martin |
| Western Conference | Orange County SC | Irvine, California | Championship Soccer Stadium | 5,000 | 2010 | 2011 | (England) Danny Stone |
| Western Conference | Phoenix Rising FC | Phoenix, Arizona | Phoenix Rising Stadium | 10,000 | 2014 | | (Norway) Pa-Modou Kah |
| Western Conference | Sacramento Republic FC | Sacramento, California | Heart Health Park | 11,569 | 2012 | 2014 | (Scotland) Neill Collins |
| Western Conference | San Antonio FC | San Antonio, Texas | Toyota Field | 8,296 | 2016 | | (United States) Carlos Llamosa |
| Western Conference | FC Tulsa | Tulsa, Oklahoma | Oneok Field | 7,833 | 2013 | 2015 | (United States) Luke Spencer |

=== Expansion teams ===
Overview of USL Championship planned teams
| Team | City | Stadium | Capacity | Founded | Joining | Head coach |
|---|---|---|---|---|---|---|
| Athletic Club Boise | Garden City, Idaho | Stadium at Expo Idaho | 7,227 | 2024 | 2027 | (United States) Nate Miller |
| Atlético Dallas | Dallas, Texas | Cotton Bowl | 90,000 | 2024 | 2027 | (France) Peter Luccin |
| Reno City FC | Reno, Nevada | Reno Soccer Stadium | 6,000 | 2025 | 2028 | |
| Ozark United FC | Rogers, Arkansas | Ozark United Stadium | 5,000 | 2023 | 2028 | |

Notes

Overview of inactive USL Championship teams
| Club | City | Stadium | Capacity | Joined | Last played | Notes |
|---|---|---|---|---|---|---|
| OKC United | Oklahoma City, Oklahoma | Oklahoma City Stadium | 10,000 | 2014 | 2021 | Planned 2028 return, pending new stadium completion |

=== Former teams ===
Overview of former USL Championship teams
| Club | City | Stadium | Capacity | Joined | Final season | MLS affiliation | Fate |
|---|---|---|---|---|---|---|---|
| Antigua Barracuda FC | St. John's, Antigua | Stanford Cricket Ground | 5,000 | 2011 | 2013 | None | Folded |
| Atlanta United 2 | Kennesaw, Georgia | Fifth Third Bank Stadium (Note: Shared facility) | 8,318 | 2018 | 2022 | Atlanta United | Moved to MLS Next Pro |
| Austin Aztex | Austin, Texas | House Park | 6,500 | 2015 | | Columbus Crew SC | Folded |
| Austin Bold FC | Austin, Texas | Circuit of the Americas | 5,000 | 2017 | 2021 | None | Folded |
| Charlotte Eagles | Charlotte, North Carolina | Dickson Field (Note: Soccer-specific stadium) | 5,006 | 2011 | 2014 | None | Moved to PDL (Note: Known as USL League Two (USL2) since the 2019 season) |
| Charlotte Independence | Charlotte, North Carolina | Memorial Stadium | 10,500 | 2014 | 2021 | None | Moved to USL League One |
| FC Cincinnati | Cincinnati, Ohio | Nippert Stadium | 33,800 | 2015 | 2018 | None | Moved to Major League Soccer |
| Dayton Dutch Lions | West Carrollton, Ohio | DOC Stadium | 3,000 | 2011 | 2014 | Columbus Crew SC | Moved to PDL |
| FC Montreal | Montreal, Quebec | Complexe sportif Claude-Robillard | 3,500 | 2015 | 2016 | Montreal Impact | Folded by MLS parent club |
| F.C. New York | Queens, New York | Belson Stadium | 2,168 | 2011 | | None | Moved to National Premier Soccer League |
| Fresno FC | Fresno, California | Chukchansi Park (Note: Baseball park) | 12,500 | 2017 | 2019 | None | Relocated to Monterey County, California, became Monterey Bay FC |
| LA Galaxy II | Carson, California | Dignity Health Sports Park | 10,000 | 2014 | 2022 | LA Galaxy | Moved to MLS Next Pro |
| Memphis 901 FC | Memphis, Tennessee | AutoZone Park | 10,000 | 2018 | 2024 | None | Folded; USL rights transferred to Santa Barbara Sky FC |
| Nashville SC | Nashville, Tennessee | First Horizon Park | 10,000 | 2016 | 2019 | None | Moved to Major League Soccer |
| New York Red Bulls II | Montclair, New Jersey | MSU Soccer Park | 5,000 | 2015 | 2022 | New York Red Bulls | Moved to MLS Next Pro |
| North Carolina FC | Cary, North Carolina | WakeMed Soccer Park | 10,000 | 2018 | 2025 | None | On hiatus, with plans to return in 2028 in USL Premier |
| Orlando City B | Orlando, Florida | Inter&Co Stadium | 3,500 | 2016 | 2017 | Orlando City SC | Moved to USL League One & now in MLS Next Pro |
| Orlando City SC | Bay Lake, Florida | ESPN Wide World of Sports Complex | 5,500 | 2011 | 2014 | Sporting Kansas City | Moved to Major League Soccer; USL rights transferred to Louisville |
| Ottawa Fury FC | Ottawa, Ontario | TD Place Stadium | 24,000 | 2017 | 2019 | Montreal Impact | Folded USL rights transferred to Miami |
| Penn FC | Harrisburg, Pennsylvania | FNB Field | 6,187 | 2011 | 2018 | None | Folded |
| Philadelphia Union II | Chester, Pennsylvania | Subaru Park | 18,500 | 2015 | 2020 | Philadelphia Union | Moved to MLS Next Pro |
| Phoenix FC | Tempe, Arizona | Sun Devil Soccer Stadium | 3,400 | 2013 | | None | Folded; replaced by Arizona United SC (Note: Renamed as Phoenix Rising FC in 2016.) |
| Portland Timbers 2 | Hillsboro, Oregon | Hillsboro Stadium | 7,600 | 2015 | 2020 | Portland Timbers | Moved to MLS Next Pro |
| Puerto Rico United (Note: Puerto Rico United, River Plate Puerto Rico, and Sevilla Puerto Rico tried to participate in the USL's first season but had financial difficulties almost immediately and the league had to cancel all games after May and make significant changes to the remaining schedule) | Aguada, Puerto Rico | Aguada Stadium | 4,000 | 2011 | | None | Moved to Liga Nacional (PR) |
| Real Monarchs | Herriman, Utah | Zions Bank Stadium | 5,000 | 2015 | 2021 | Real Salt Lake | Moved to MLS Next Pro |
| Reno 1868 FC | Reno, Nevada | Greater Nevada Field | 9,013 | 2017 | 2020 | San Jose Earthquakes | Folded |
| Richmond Kickers | Richmond, Virginia | City Stadium | 22,000 | 2011 | 2018 | D.C. United | Moved to USL League One |
| Rio Grande Valley FC | Edinburg, Texas | H-E-B Park | 9,400 | 2016 | 2023 | None | Folded |
| River Plate Puerto Rico | Fajardo, Puerto Rico | Roberto Clemente Stadium | 12,500 | 2011 | | None | Moved to Puerto Rico Soccer League |
| Rochester Rhinos | Rochester, New York | Rochester Community Sports Complex Stadium | 13,768 | 2011 | 2017 | New England Revolution | Moved to MLS Next Pro |
| Saint Louis FC | Fenton, Missouri | West Community Stadium | 5,500 | 2014 | 2020 | None | Folded |
| San Diego Loyal SC | San Diego, California | Torero Stadium | 6,000 | 2020 | 2023 | None | Folded |
| Sevilla Puerto Rico | Juncos, Puerto Rico | Josué Elevadito González Stadium | 2,500 | 2011 | | None | Moved to Liga Nacional (PR) |
| Sporting Kansas City II | Kansas City, Kansas | Children's Mercy Park | 18,467 | 2016 | 2021 | Sporting Kansas City | Moved to MLS Next Pro |
| Tacoma Defiance | Tacoma, Washington | Cheney Stadium | 6,500 | 2015 | 2021 | Seattle Sounders FC | Moved to MLS Next Pro |
| Toronto FC II | Toronto, Ontario | Lamport Stadium | 9,600 | 2014 | 2018 | Toronto FC | Moved to USL League One & now in MLS Next Pro |
| Vancouver Whitecaps FC 2 | Vancouver, British Columbia | Thunderbird Stadium | 3,500 | 2015 | 2017 | Vancouver Whitecaps FC | Moved to MLS Next Pro |
| VSI Tampa Bay FC | Plant City, Florida | Plant City Stadium | 6,700 | 2013 | 2013 | None | Folded |
| Wilmington Hammerheads FC | Wilmington, North Carolina | Legion Stadium | 6,000 | 2011 | 2016 | Toronto FC & New York City FC | Moved to PDL |

=== Timeline ===
==== From beginning of USL Pro to reserve team exit ====
‡ Puerto Rico clubs Puerto Rico United, River Plate Puerto Rico, and Sevilla Puerto Rico began play in the league, but in May 2011 United Soccer Leagues announced that the teams would not finish the season due to financial difficulties.

== Competition format ==
For the 2026 season, teams are playing an uneven schedule, playing home-and-away within their conference and an additional five or six games against teams in the opposing conference for an unbalanced 30-game schedule. At the conclusion of the regular season, the top eight teams in each conference will qualify for the playoffs. The USL Championship playoffs are a single-elimination tournament with a fixed bracket format, culminating in the USL Championship Final.

== Media coverage ==
Fox Sports purchased the league's broadcasting rights for the 2011 and 2012 seasons, and aired matches on its Fox Soccer channel, while the league livestreamed matches on its USL Live website. The USL has been partnered with ESPN since the 2016 season. The first iteration of the deal brought 20 matches to ESPN3 and the championship match to one of its linear networks, while all remaining matches were broadcast directly by the league on its YouTube channel.

Beginning with the launch of ESPN+ on April 12, 2018, all USL matches moved to the over-the-top service, with 18 games of the week and the championship continuing to air on one of ESPN's linear channels. The 2019 final also aired on ESPN Deportes. The deal with ESPN expired after the 2019 season, but was subsequently renewed for three additional seasons. Although the ESPN+ match streams are not blacked out in-market, individual clubs are also allowed to syndicate the USL-produced broadcast to local television stations.

The English-language commentary team for the USL Championship on ESPN has included Mike Watts and Devon Kerr since 2018. Watts and Kerr also host a weekly program, USL All-Access, on SiriusXM FC. Broadcasts on ESPN Deportes have been led by Jesús Eduardo Acosta and José Armando Rodriguez.

In August 2020, the USL announced their first international broadcast partner with Caribbean broadcaster Flow Sports.

In August 2021, the USL announced a new broadcast agreement with OneFootball in Italy.

The USL announced a four-year media deal with CBS Sports beginning with the 2024 season through 2027. On February 27, 2024, the USL also announced a multi-year deal with ESPN as a second broadcast partner through 2026.

| Region | Broadcaster |
|---|---|
| United States | CBS Sports: (CBS, Paramount+, CBS Sports Network and CBS Sports Golazo Network) |
| United States | ESPN, ESPN2 and ESPN+ |
| Caribbean | Flow Sports |
| Italy | OneFootball |

== Champions ==
Teams that no longer participate in the USL Championship are in italics.

| Season | Playoff champions | Players' Shield (Note: Known as the "Commissioners Cup" from 2011 to 2014 and the "regular season champions" from 2015 to 2022.) |
USL Professional Division (USL Pro)
| 2011 | Orlando City SC | Orlando City SC |
| 2012 | Charleston Battery | Orlando City SC |
| 2013 | Orlando City SC | Richmond Kickers |
| 2014 | Sacramento Republic FC | Orlando City SC |
United Soccer League
| 2015 | Rochester Rhinos | Rochester Rhinos |
| 2016 | New York Red Bulls II | New York Red Bulls II |
| 2017 | Louisville City FC | Real Monarchs SLC |
| 2018 | Louisville City FC | FC Cincinnati |
USL Championship
| 2019 | Real Monarchs SLC | Phoenix Rising FC |
| 2020 | Cancelled due to COVID-19 pandemic | Reno 1868 FC |
| 2021 | Orange County SC | Tampa Bay Rowdies |
| 2022 | San Antonio FC | San Antonio FC |
| 2023 | Phoenix Rising FC | Pittsburgh Riverhounds SC |
| 2024 | Colorado Springs Switchbacks FC | Louisville City FC |
| 2025 | Pittsburgh Riverhounds SC | Louisville City FC |
| 2026 | Sacramento Republic FC | Tampa Bay Rowdies |

=== USL Championship Final results ===
| Season | Champions | Score | Runners–up | Venue | Attendance | MVP |
|---|---|---|---|---|---|---|
| 2011 | Orlando City SC | 2–2 (a.e.t.) (3–2 p) | Harrisburg City Islanders | Citrus Bowl | 11,220 | Sean Kelley (ORL) |
| 2012 | Charleston Battery | 1–0 | Wilmington Hammerheads | Blackbaud Stadium | 4,963 | Jose Cuevas (CHS) |
| 2013 | Orlando City SC | 7–4 | Charlotte Eagles | Citrus Bowl | 20,886 | Dom Dwyer (ORL) |
| 2014 | Sacramento Republic | 2–0 | Harrisburg City Islanders | Bonney Field | 8,000 | Rodrigo López (SAC) |
| 2015 | Rochester Rhinos | 2–1 (a.e.t.) | LA Galaxy II | Sahlen's Stadium | 5,247 | Asani Samuels (ROC) |
| 2016 | New York Red Bulls II | 5–1 | Swope Park Rangers | Red Bull Arena | 5,547 | Brandon Allen (NYRB) |
| 2017 | Louisville City FC | 1–0 | Swope Park Rangers | Louisville Slugger Field | 14,456 | Paolo DelPiccolo (LOU) |
| 2018 | Louisville City FC | 1–0 | Phoenix Rising FC | Lynn Stadium | 7,025 | Luke Spencer (LOU) |
| 2019 | Real Monarchs | 3–1 | Louisville City FC | Lynn Stadium | 7,025 | Konrad Plewa (SLC) |
| 2020 | Final cancelled due to COVID-19 pandemic (Note: The 2020 final was scheduled to be played at Al Lang Stadium between Tampa Bay Rowdies and Phoenix Rising FC.) | | | | | |
| 2021 | Orange County SC | 3–1 | Tampa Bay Rowdies | Al Lang Stadium | 7,521 | Ronaldo Damus (OCO) |
| 2022 | San Antonio FC | 3–1 | Louisville City FC | Toyota Field | 8,534 | Santiago Patiño (SAN) |
| 2023 | Phoenix Rising FC | 1–1 (a.e.t.) (3–2 p) | Charleston Battery | Patriots Point Soccer Complex | 5,094 | Rocco Ríos Novo (PHX) |
| 2024 | Colorado Springs Switchbacks FC | 3–0 | Rhode Island FC | Weidner Field | 8,023 | Juan Tejada (COS) |
| 2025 | Pittsburgh Riverhounds SC | 0–0 (a.e.t.) (5–3 p) | FC Tulsa | Oneok Field | 9,507 | Eric Dick (PGH) |
| 2026 | Sacramento Republic FC | 1–1 (a.e.t.) (4–3 p) | Louisville City FC | Heart Health Park | 11,569 | Danny Vitiello (SAC) |

== USL club honors ==
Updated to the end of the 2025 USL playoffs; sorted by major honors (championships).

| Team | Seasons | USL playoffs | | USL regular season | | Total honors | Major trophies / championships |
| Team | Seasons | Winner | Runner-up | Winner | Runner-up | Total honors | Major trophies / championships |
|---|---|---|---|---|---|---|---|
| Orlando City SC | 4 | 2 | — | 3 | 1 | 6 | 5 |
| Louisville City FC | 11 | 2 | 3 | 2 | 4 | 10 | 4 |
| New York Red Bulls II | 8 | 1 | — | 1 | — | 2 | 2 |
| Pittsburgh Riverhounds SC | 15 | 1 | — | 1 | — | 2 | 2 |
| Phoenix Rising FC | 12 | 1 | 2 (Note: Includes the canceled 2020 finals.) | 1 | — | 4 | 2 |
| Rochester Rhinos | 7 | 1 | — | 1 | 1 | 3 | 2 |
| Real Monarchs | 7 | 1 | — | 1 | — | 2 | 2 |
| San Antonio FC | 10 | 1 | — | 1 | — | 2 | 2 |
| Charleston Battery | 15 | 1 | 1 | — | 2 | 4 | 1 |
| Colorado Springs Switchbacks FC | 11 | 1 | — | — | — | 1 | 1 |
| FC Cincinnati | 3 | — | — | 1 | — | 1 | 1 |
| Orange County SC | 15 | 1 | — | — | — | 1 | 1 |
| Reno 1868 FC | 4 | — | — | 1 | — | 1 | 1 |
| Richmond Kickers | 8 | — | — | 1 | — | 1 | 1 |
| Sacramento Republic | 12 | 2 | — | — | 1 | 3 | 2 |
| Tampa Bay Rowdies | 9 | — | 2 | 2 | — | 4 | 1 |
| Harrisburg City Islanders | 8 | — | 2 | — | — | 2 | 0 |
| Sporting Kansas City II | 6 | — | 2 | — | — | 2 | 0 |
| Wilmington Hammerheads | 6 | — | 1 | — | 1 | 2 | 0 |
| Charlotte Eagles | 4 | — | 1 | — | — | 1 | 0 |
| FC Tulsa | 11 | — | 1 | — | — | 1 | 0 |
| LA Galaxy II | 8 | — | 1 | — | — | 1 | 0 |
| Rhode Island FC | 2 | — | 1 | — | — | 1 | 0 |

=== Player records ===
As of January 27, 2024

Most USL goals
| Rank | Player | Goals |
|---|---|---|
| 1 | (Jamaica) Dane Kelly | 104 |
| 2 | (Jamaica) Neco Brett | 86 |
| 3 | (United States) Corey Hertzog | 73 |
| 4 | (Colombia) Jorge Herrera | 72 |
| 5 | (England) Cameron Lancaster | 71 |
| 6 | (United States) Chandler Hoffman | 66 |
| 7 | (Guinea) Hadji Barry | 63 |
| 8 | (United States) Kyle Greig | 61 |
| 9 | (United States) Cameron Iwasa | 59 |
| 10 | (United States) George Davis IV | 57 |
| 10 | (Jamaica) Junior Flemmings | 57 |

Most USL appearances
| Rank | Player | Apps |
|---|---|---|
| 1 | (United States) George Davis IV | 242 |
| 2 | (United States) Taylor Mueller | 241 |
| 2 | (Colombia) Jorge Herrera | 231 |
| 4 | (Jamaica) Dane Kelly | 228 |
| 5 | (United States) Josh Suggs | 223 |
| 6 | (United States) Kyle Greig | 222 |
| 7 | (Jamaica) Neco Brett | 203 |
| 8 | (United States) Luke Vercollone | 200 |
| 9 | (United States) Christian Duke | 199 |
| 10 | (United States) Kadeem Dacres | 197 |

Most USL assists
| Rank | Player | Asts |
|---|---|---|
| 1 | (Jamaica) Kenardo Forbes | 45 |
| 2 | (United States) Danny Barrera | 44 |
| 3 | (Ghana) Solomon Asante | 41 |
| 4 | (Cuba) Maikel Chang | 38 |
| 5 | (Colombia) Jorge Herrera | 35 |
| 6 | (United States) Antoine Hoppenot | 33 |
| 6 | (United States) Rodrigo Lopez | 33 |
| 7 | (Haiti) Christiano François | 32 |
| 7 | (United States) Brian Ownby | 32 |
| 8 | (Uruguay) Enzo Martinez | 30 |

Most USL clean sheets
| Rank | Player | CS |
|---|---|---|
| 1 | (United States) Evan Newton | 57 |
| 2 | (United States) Brandon Miller | 43 |
| 3 | (Cuba) Odisnel Cooper | 40 |
| 4 | (United States) Matt Pickens | 37 |
| 4 | (United States) Tomas Gomez | 37 |
| 5 | (Puerto Rico) Cody Laurendi | 36 |
| 6 | (United States) Carl Woszczynski | 34 |
| 7 | (Greece) Alex Tambakis | 33 |
| 8 | (Mexico) Miguel Gallardo | 32 |
| 8 | (United States) Andrew Dykstra | 32 |

== Attendance ==
FC Cincinnati played before a record crowd of 20,497 at Nippert Stadium on April 16, 2016, in a rivalry match against neighboring Louisville City FC. This broke the USL Pro's previous record for attendance at a regular-season match of 20,231 set by Sacramento Republic in its home debut on April 26, 2014, at Hughes Stadium. Cincinnati broke the record again on May 14, 2016, with a new all-time high of 23,375. Cincinnati broke the single game attendance record again on October 2, 2016, in their first ever playoff match against the Charleston Battery, losing 2–1 in the quarterfinals of the 2016 USL playoffs. The attendance of 30,187 also set the USL playoff record.

Cincinnati broke the regular season record again on August 5, 2017, at Nippert Stadium, drawing 25,308 against Orlando City B. They broke their own record again about six weeks later drawing 30,417 to a 4–2 win over the New York Red Bulls II. Cincinnati broke the record once more in their final home regular season game as a USL team on September 29, 2018, drawing 31,478 versus Indy Eleven.

| Season | Teams | League total | League avg. | Playoff total | Playoff avg. | Combined total | Combined Average | Highest teams | Lowest teams | Ref |
|---|---|---|---|---|---|---|---|---|---|---|
| 2011 | 12 | 322,597 | 2,274 | 38,886 | 5,555 | 361,483 | 2,394 | 5,330 (Orlando City); 4,927 (Rochester) | 410 (Los Angeles Blues); 542 (Dayton) | |
| 2012 | 11 | 345,790 | 2,777 | 20,321 | 4,064 | 366,111 | 2,712 | 6,606 (Orlando City); 6,265 (Rochester) | 666 (Los Angeles Blues); 722 (Dayton) | |
| 2013 | 13 | 464,723 | 2,611 | 48,920 | 6,989 | 513,643 | 2,718 | 8,056 (Orlando City); 5,898 (Rochester) | 378 (VSI Tampa Bay); 718 (Los Angeles Blues) | |
| 2014 | 14 | 610,351 | 3,114 | 37,778 | 5,397 | 648,129 | 2,987 | 11,293 (Sacramento); 5,329 (Rochester) | 533 (Dayton); 597 (LA Galaxy II) | |
| 2015 | 24 | 1,121,962 | 3,369 | 60,090 | 5,463 | 1,182,052 | 3,407 | 11,313 (Sacramento); 6,765 (Louisville City) | 313 (FC Montreal); 479 (Toronto FC ll) | |
| 2016 | 29 | 1,496,493 | 3,439 | | 5,281 | | | 17,296 (FC Cincinnati); 11,514 (Sacramento) | 243 (FC Montreal); 589 (New York Red Bulls II) | |
| 2017 | 30 | 2,065,006 | 4,302 | | 5,339 | | | 21,198 (FC Cincinnati); 11,569 (Sacramento) | 632 (New York Red Bulls II); 869 (Vancouver Whitecaps 2) | |
| 2018 | 33 | 2,756,759 | 4,923 | | 7,786 | | | 25,717 (FC Cincinnati); 11,311 (Sacramento) | 810 (Toronto FC II); 812 (New York Red Bulls II) | |
| 2019 | 36 | 2,740,323 | 4,478 | | 5,389 | | | 12,693 (New Mexico United); 10,734 (Indy Eleven) | 478 (Bethlehem Steel FC); 505 (Swope Park Rangers) | |
| 2020 | 35 | 64,619 | 4,039 | | | | | | | |
| 2021 | 31 | 1,742,808 | 4,138 | 93,029 | 6,645 | 1,835,837 | 4,220 | 12,115 (Louisville City); 10,418 (New Mexico United) | 310 (Loudoun United); 369 (New York Red Bulls II) | |
| 2022 | 27 | 1,983,922 | 5,061* | 104,695 | 8,054 | 2,088,617 | 5,131* | 10,724 (New Mexico United); 10,465 (Louisville City) | 325 (LA Galaxy II); 399 (New York Red Bulls II) | |
| 2023 | 24 | 1,996,066 | 5,803* | 95,916 | 6,394 | 2,091,982 | 5,827* | 10,627 (Sacramento); 10,547 (Louisville City) | 1,432 (Miami FC); 2,664 (Loudoun United) | |
| 2024 | 24 | 2,123,760 | 5,009 | 105,314 | 7,021 | 2,229,074 | 5,078 | 10,106 (Sacramento); 9,795 (Indy) | 1,075 (Miami); 1,882 (Las Vegas) | |
| 2025 | 24 | 2,002,663 | 5,563 | 100,391 | 7,722 | 2,103,054 | 5,623 | 9,801 (Sacramento); 9,751 (Louisville) | 1,166 (Miami); 2,333 (Loudoun) | |
*Average attendance only includes matches in which attendances were reported. Matches without attendance are exlcuded.

Key
Record high
Record low
Affected by the COVID-19 pandemic

== See also ==
- Soccer in the United States
- Soccer in Canada
- Professional sports leagues in the United States
