= NWSL Division 2 =

Proposed women's soccer league in the United States

- Organizing body: National Women's; Soccer League (NWSL)
- First season: 2027 (proposed)
- Country: United States
- Confederation: CONCACAF
- Number of clubs: 8
- Level on pyramid: 2 (proposed)

NWSL Division 2 is the colloquial name for a professional women's soccer league proposed by the National Women's Soccer League (NWSL), which would operate in the second tier of the United States league system. Envisioned as a farm league for NWSL franchises to recruit and foster talent following the discontinuation of the NWSL Draft, and to stabilize the NWSL's place amid a rapid growth of pro women's soccer in the United States, the Division 2 league would feature eight reserve teams of NWSL franchises. Its regular season would consist of a double round-robin schedule followed by a championship-determining playoff tournament for the top four teams. Alongside WPSL Pro, the two leagues would become the first professional minor leagues in American women's soccer.

== History ==
The National Women's Soccer League (NWSL) commenced play in 2013, and was the sole professional women's soccer league in the United States for over a decade. Though the National Independent Soccer Association and United Women's Soccer jointly attempted to form a second pro league, the United Soccer League were the first to successfully launch one, with their Super League in 2024. The Women's Premier Soccer League (WPSL) also began plans for a pro league, WPSL Pro, and initially sought for it Division 3 status from U.S. Soccer, the governing body of soccer in the United States. Seeking stability for its flagship league amid this rapid growth of pro women's soccer in the United States, the NWSL established a new league to serve as a "transitional space" between college soccer and the NWSL following the discontinuation of its college draft in 2024, aiming to foster a "space for clubs to build roster depth" modelled after Minor League Baseball.

Proposed U.S. pro league structure
Div. 1	National Women's Soccer League
Div. 1	USL Super League
Div. 2	NWSL Division 2
Div. 2	WPSL Pro

In an effort to "meet a deadline", the NWSL applied for Division 2 status for the league in April 2025, though the league's existence was not publicized until a CBS Sports report disclosing the application was published a few weeks later. Days prior to this revelation, the WPSL announced that it would be seeking Division 2 status for WPSL Pro, following Cleveland Pro Soccer's entry and investment into the league. Cleveland Pro Soccer had bid for a NWSL franchise, but lost to Denver Summit FC, and sought an alternative means of commencing play. At the time of the NWSL and WPSL's applications, U.S. Soccer required all clubs in a Division 2 league to have a venue capacity over 2,000, and a principal owner with a net worth over US$7.5 million; and at least half of the clubs based in markets with over 500,000 residents. The NWSL seeks to meet these requirements by populating the league with reserve teams owned by NWSL franchises, with which infrastructure and resources would be shared. However, some of the eight franchises named as charter members in the application were not committed at the time, having raised concerns about the cost of operating a reserve team. As of February 2026, the league has not been publicly announced by the NWSL.

== Format ==
The league's regular season would be played as a fourteen-game, double round robin, where each team plays the other seven teams twice – both at home and away. At the end of the regular season, the four best-performing teams qualify for a seeded, single-elimination playoff tournament, where the first-placed team plays the fourth-placed team, and second plays third. The winners advance to a final match that determines the league's champion for that season.

== Teams ==
Locations of teams expected to compete in the inaugural season.

While the NWSL's ambition is for all sixteen NWSL franchises to eventually field reserve teams into the league by its 2029 season, and for independent clubs to also compete in the future, its inaugural 2027 (Note: The league originally was planned to start their inaugural season in 2026.) season is planned to feature eight reserve teams – fielded by Bay FC, Gotham FC, Kansas City Current, North Carolina Courage, Orlando Pride, Racing Louisville, Seattle Reign, and the Washington Spirit. Although it was originally intended for all eight teams to play in the same home ground as their first teams, a new, purpose-built stadium is being planned for Kansas City Current II.

NWSL Division 2 teams
Team	Affiliate	Location	Venue	First
TBD	Bay FC	San Jose, California	PayPal Park	2027
TBD	Gotham FC	Harrison, New Jersey	Sports Illustrated Stadium	2027
Kansas City Current II	Kansas City Current	Riverside, Missouri	Riverside Stadium	2027
TBD	North Carolina Courage	Cary, North Carolina	WakeMed Soccer Park	2027
TBD	Orlando Pride	Orlando, Florida	Inter&Co Stadium	2027
TBD	Racing Louisville FC	Louisville, Kentucky	Lynn Family Stadium	2027
TBD	Seattle Reign FC	Seattle, Washington	Lumen Field	2027
TBD	Washington Spirit	Washington, D.C.	Audi Field	2027

== See also ==
- Prominent women's sports leagues in the United States and Canada
- MLS Next Pro
- MLS Reserve League
