= United States soccer league system =

Series of professional and amateur soccer leagues

- Country: United States
- Sport: Soccer
- Promotion and relegation: Yes

National system
- Federation: United States Soccer Federation
- Confederation: CONCACAF
- Top division: Major League Soccer (men); National Women's Soccer League (women); USL Super League (women)
- Second division: USL Championship (men)
- Cup competition: U.S. Open Cup (men); Challenge Cup (women)

The United States soccer league system is a series of professional and amateur soccer leagues based, in whole or in part, in the United States. Although sometimes called the American soccer pyramid, teams and leagues are not linked by a system of promotion and relegation as is common in other countries. Instead, the United States Soccer Federation (USSF or U.S. Soccer) defines professional leagues in three levels, called divisions, with all other leagues sanctioned by the USSF not having an official designated level or division.

For practical and historical reasons, some teams from Bermuda, Canada, and Puerto Rico (considered a separate country by FIFA) can also compete in these leagues. However, these teams are not eligible for the U.S. Open Cup and cannot represent the United States in the CONCACAF Champions Cup because they are not affiliated with U.S. Soccer.

== Structure ==
The country's governing body for the sport, the United States Soccer Federation (also known as the USSF or U.S. Soccer), oversees the league system and is responsible for sanctioning professional leagues. The leagues themselves are responsible for admitting and administering individual teams. Amateur soccer in the United States is regulated by the United States Adult Soccer Association (USASA), the only amateur soccer organization sanctioned by the USSF.

Currently, no professional league in any of the major pro sports leagues in the U.S. or Canada uses a system of promotion and relegation. Some amateur leagues sanctioned by the USASA also use promotion and relegation systems within multiple levels of their leagues, although there has never been a merit-based promotion system offered to the NPSL, the USASA's "national" league.

In February 2025, the United Soccer League (USL) announced it would be launching a new Division I league, USL Premier, in 2028 to alongside its two existing professional leagues; USL Championship, and USL League One. USL indicated it planned to be the first major pro league in the US to implement promotion and relegation.

College soccer in the United States is sanctioned by bodies outside the direct control of the USSF, the most important of which is the National Collegiate Athletic Association (NCAA). See NCAA Division I women's soccer programs, NCAA Division I men's soccer programs, and NCAA Division II men's soccer programs for a list of college soccer programs in the United States.

=== General professional standards ===
The standards for Division I, II and III leagues are set by the USSF.

==== Market requirements ====
- At least 75% of a league's teams must be based in the United States
- At least a certain percentage of a league's teams must be based in markets with a certain population

==== Field and stadium requirements ====
- All stadiums must have controllable ingress/egress
- All outdoor leagues must be playing on FIFA-approved surfaces at least 70 yards (64 m) by 110 yards (100 m) in dimension
- Minimum required stadium fan capacity, dependent on league level
- Each team must have a lease to use its stadium for at least one full season no later than a certain date before each season begins

==== Financial viability ====
- Minimum annual bond each team must pay to the league (or Federation), dependent on league level
- Each ownership group must display the ability to fund their team for a certain number of years
- At least a certain net worth for each team's principal owner

==== Standards summary table ====
Overview of USSF standards
Division	Men			Women			Indoor
Division	DI	DII	DIII	DI	DII	DIII	Indoor
Minimum number of teams	12	8		8	6		6
Minimum number of teams	Year 3: 14	Year 3: 10; Year 6: 12		Year 4: 10	Year 3: 8		Year 3: 8
Req. participation	All eligible CONCACAF competitions		Open Cup	All eligible CONCACAF competitions		Open Cup	
Geographic coverage	Eastern, Central, and Pacific time zones	Two time zones		Two time zones			
Geographic coverage	Eastern, Central, and Pacific time zones	Year 6: Eastern, Central, and Pacific time zones		Year 6: Eastern, Central, and Pacific time zones			
Market population	>75% with >1mil	>75% with >750k		>75% with >750k	>50% with >500k		
Stadium capacity	15,000	5,000	1,000	5,000	2,000	1,000	1,000
Lease lead	180 days	120 days		120 days			
Bond	$1 mil	$750 k	$250 k	$100 k	$50 k	$20 k	$20 k
Time guarantee	5 years	3 years		3 years			3 years
Primary owner worth	$40 mil	$20 mil	$10 mil	$15 mil	$7.5 mil	$5 mil	$3 mil

==== League specifics ====
===== Men's Division I =====
Ownership requirements

- League must have a minimum of 12 teams to apply. By year three, the league must have a minimum of 14 teams
- US-based teams must participate in all representative U.S. Soccer and CONCACAF competitions for which they are eligible (ex. U.S. Open Cup, CONCACAF Champions Cup.)
- The majority owner must have a net worth of US$40 million, and the total ownership group must have a net worth of US$70 million. Both of these net worth requirements must be independent of both the club and the individuals' primary residence.

Market requirements

- Teams located in at least the Eastern, Central and Pacific time zones in the continental United States. These three time zones are required because the majority of the large population centers are located in these time zones
- At least 75% of the league's teams must be based in markets with one million population
- All stadiums must be enclosed
- All league stadiums must have a minimum seating capacity of 15,000
- Not later than 180 days prior to the start of each season, each team shall have a lease for at least one full season with its home stadium

Financial viability

- The league must demonstrate adequate financial viability to ensure continued operation on a season-by-season basis either in the form of a performance bond or similar instrument for each team in the amount of US$1 million or readily available league funds representing US$1 million
- The maximum amount of readily available league funds for covering teams operations is US$20 million
- Any team whose performance bond is used during the season will be required to replenish it at least 120 days prior to the next season
- Each team ownership group must demonstrate the financial capacity to operate the team for five years. As part of the process of demonstrating financial capacity, each ownership group must provide detailed financial history (if applicable) and projections (including a detailed budget) for the team to the Federation in a form satisfactory to the Federation. In addition, each team must have and its governing legal documents must designate one principal owner with a controlling interest who owns at least 15% of the team and has authority to bind the team. Such principal owner must have an individual net worth of at least forty million US dollars (US$40,000,000) exclusive of the value of his/her ownership in the league or team and his/her primary personal residence. The principal owner, together with all other owners, must have a combined individual net worth of at least seventy million US dollars (US$70,000,000) exclusive of the value of ownership interests in the league or team and primary personal residences. Federation shall have the right to require an independent audit to establish that the team meets these net worth requirements; the cost of such audit shall be the responsibility of the team or league. The Federation will take reasonable steps to protect from disclosure and limit access to financial information provided under this section

Media

- The league must have broadcast or cable television contracts that provide for the telecasting of all regular season games as well as the championship game/series. High-quality internet streaming of regular season games satisfies this requirement

Team organization

- All required positions must be filled by full-time staff year-round
- Each US-based team must demonstrate a commitment to a player development program. This requirement may be satisfied by supporting either an amateur or professional reserve team competing in a USSF-sanctioned league or by the league itself
- Each US-based team must maintain teams and a program to develop players at the youth level. This requirement may be satisfied by fielding teams in a Federation academy program

League operations

In addition to the required positions filled by full-time staff, the league office must have full-time staff performing the functions of a chief operations officer, a chief financial officer and a director of marketing/public relations on a year-round basis

===== Men's Division II =====
Ownership requirements

- Principal owner with at least US$20,000,000 net worth, 15% ownership stake.

Markets and stadia

- Year 1: Eight teams in at least 2 time zones
- Year 3: At least 10 teams
- Year 6: at least 12 teams in Eastern, Central, and Pacific time zones
- 75% of teams must be in metro areas of at least 750,000 population
- Stadiums must have 5,000 capacity

===== Men's Division III =====
Ownership requirements

- Principal owner with at least US$10,000,000 net worth, 15% ownership stake.

Markets and stadia

- Year 1: Eight teams
- Stadiums must have 1,000 capacity

== Men's leagues ==
=== Professional leagues ===
Professional soccer leagues in the United States
Division	League	Abbreviation	Teams	First season
I	Major League Soccer	MLS	30	1996
I	USL Premier (Proposed)	USLP	12	2028
II	USL Championship	USLC	25	2011
III	MLS Next Pro	MLSNP	30	2022
III	USL League One	USL1	17	2019

Since 1996, Major League Soccer (MLS) has been the only sanctioned USSF Division I men's outdoor soccer league in the United States. MLS has grown from 10 teams in 1996 to 30 teams in 2025.

The USL Championship (USLC) is the only sanctioned Division II men's outdoor soccer league since 2018. Formed in 2010 as a result of the merger of the former USL First Division and USL Second Division, the USL Championship was sanctioned as Division III league from 2011 to 2016 before becoming provisionally sanctioned as a Division II league for 2017, and receiving full Division II sanctioning in 2018.

In March 2017, the United Soccer League announced following the sanctioning of the USL Championship as a Division II league it would start a new tier in its professional structure. USL League One received sanctioning in December 2018 and conducted its first season in 2019 with 10 teams.

The reserve league for MLS, MLS Next Pro, received Division III sanctioning and began play in 2022. Prior to this, most MLS teams had their reserve teams in the USL system before moving to the new MLS owned league.

Several other leagues have previously received sanctioning, including:

- North American Soccer League (1968–1984)
- American Professional Soccer League (1990–1996)
- USISL Pro League/USL Second Division (1995–2010)
- USISL A-League/USL First Division (1996–2010)
- the second North American Soccer League (2011–2017)
- National Independent Soccer Association (2019–2024)

==== Number of teams in each league ====
Below is a list of the number of teams sanctioned by the USSF under the current division sanctioning scheme described above.

Pro soccer teams (includes teams outside United States)
Year	Total pro teams (Note: Only includes those sanctioned by USSF as Professional)	1	2	3
		–	APSL	–
1994	7	–	7	–
		–	A-League (Note: American Professional Soccer League changed their name to A-League.)	USISL PL
1995	61	–	6	55
		MLS	A-League/USISL SL (Note: USISL divided into 2 divisions, Select in Division II and Pro in Division III)	USISL PL
1996	65	10	28 (Note: Includes 7 A-League teams and 21 USISL Select League teams.)	27
		MLS	A-League (Note: A-League merged with USISL and teams from USISL Select League became part of the A-League. The merger avoided competing Division II leagues.)	USL D3 Pro (Note: USISL renamed their Division III league to USISL D3 Pro in 1997, and again in 1999 to USL D3 Pro as part of the re-branding of USISL to United Soccer Leagues.)
1997	73	10	24	39
1998	79	12	28	39
1999	68	12	30	26
2000	59	12	25	22
2001	50	12	21	17
2002	46	10	18	18
		MLS	A-League	Pro League (Note: Started the 2003 season called the USL Pro Select League but was changed to Pro Soccer League for legal reasons.)
2003	42	10	19	13
2004	38	10	16	12
		MLS	USL-1 (Note: The A-League was renamed USL First Division, abbreviated USL-1.)	USL-2 (Note: The Pro League was renamed USL Second Division, abbreviated USL-2.)
2005	33	12	12	9
2006	33	12	12	9
2007	35	13	12	10
2008	35	14	11	10
2009	35	15	11	9
		MLS	USSF D2 Pro (Note: Temporary USSF-organized league which had teams from the USL First Division and the newly formed North American Soccer League.)	USL-2
2010	34	16	12	6
		MLS	NASL	USL (Note: USL-1 and USL-2 merged, and re-branded as USL Pro until 2015, and then USL.)
2011	38	18	8	12
2012	38	19	8	11
2013	40	19	8	13
2014	43	19	10	14
2015	55	20	11	24
2016	61	20	12	29
		MLS	NASL/USL	– (Note: No league played at the Division III level in 2017 or 2018.)
2017	60	22	38 (Note: USL had 30 teams and gained provisional Division II sanctioning in 2017. NASL and its 8 teams continued their provisional Division II sanctioning in 2017.)	–
		MLS	USL	–
2018	56	23	33	–
		MLS	USLC (Note: USL re-branded as USL Championship beginning with the 2019 season.)	USL1/NISA
2019	77	24	36	17 (Note: Includes 10 USL1 clubs and 7 NISA clubs.)
2020	81	26	35	20 (Note: Includes 12 USL1 clubs and 8 NISA clubs.)
2021	79	27	31	21 (Note: Includes 12 USL1 clubs and the 9 clubs participating in the second half of the 2020–21 NISA season.)
		MLS	USLC	USL1/MLSNP/NISA
2022	95	28	27	40 (Note: Includes 11 USL1 clubs, 21 MLSNP clubs and 8 NISA clubs.)
2023	101	29	24	48 (Note: Includes 12 USL1 clubs, 27 MLSNP clubs and 9 NISA clubs.)
2024	103	29	24	50 (Note: Includes 12 USL1 clubs, 29 MLSNP clubs, and 9 NISA clubs.)
		MLS	USLC	USL1/MLSNP
2025	97	30	24	43 (Note: Includes 14 USL1 clubs and 29 MLSNP clubs.)
2026	103	30	25	47 (Note: Includes 17 USL1 clubs and 30 MLSNP clubs.)

=== Semi-professional and amateur leagues ===
The USSF does not officially recognize distinctions beyond the three professional divisions above. Currently, three other national leagues are sanctioned by the US Soccer Federation and one of those, the National Premier Soccer League (NPSL), is part of USASA which is a national association member of the USSF and the only member of the Adult Council. USL League Two (USL 2) is a national league run by the USL. Both are recognized in practical terms as playing at a higher level and both since 2020 are considered national leagues earning automatic berths to the US Open Cup first round based on their previous season's league results rather than going through local qualifying. The United Premier Soccer League (UPSL) is also recognized by the USSF as a National Affiliate, but does not gain automatic entry to the Open Cup through the National League track, instead going through local qualifiers. Additionally, clubs in USL2, UPSL and NPSL pay some of their players and are more accurately described as semi-professional leagues.

USL League Two takes place during the summer months, and has age restrictions. Thus, the player pool is drawn mainly from NCAA college soccer players seeking to continue playing high level soccer during their summer break, while still maintaining their college eligibility. The National Premier Soccer League is similar to USL2 and also attracts top amateur talent from around the United States. However, unlike USL2, the NPSL does not have any age limits or restrictions, thus incorporating both college players and former professional players.. The United Premier Soccer League takes place year round with two seasons, one in spring and one in fall. Unlike USL2 and NPSL, the UPSL does not rely on college players and is the national league with the most diverse participation.

=== Men's league structure ===
The table below shows the current structure of the system. For each division, its official name, sponsorship name, number of clubs and conferences/divisions are given. The United States Soccer Federation regulates the standards for a league or division to be recognized as professional, while also determining the level of division for each league.

Division	Professional leagues sanctioned by the United States Soccer Federation	
I	Major League Soccer; 30 clubs – 2 conferences (Note: Note: Teams do play cross-conference opponents during the regular season)	USL Premier (sanctioning pending); 12 clubs (planned, 2028)
II	USL Championship; 25 clubs – 2 conferences	
III	MLS Next Pro; 30 clubs – 2 conferences	USL League One; 17 clubs

The system is only defined as far as Division 3. Some semi-professional leagues refer to themselves as fourth division, however any tier or division numbers are not recognized for these leagues as U.S. Soccer does not designate a division number nor directly sanction anything below Division 3. What follows is a list of additional notable leagues.

Amateur leagues (Note: In the below table the leagues are ordered, from top to bottom, in a general sense based on quality of play -recognized through USSF National Open Cup qualification route and on relationships between some leagues, as well as on national footprint, however there is no official "rankings" between all these leagues. Currently promotion/relegation is only found internally within the two tiers of the UPSL and between some of the USASA leagues, and not among any others of these leagues, nor with leagues at the professional levels – though teams may rarely voluntarily promote or relegate between the USL1 & USL2.)
Geographic scope	USASA sanctioned	Non-USASA sanctioned
National leagues (with automatic Open Cup qualifications) (Note: When compared to other continental-sized countries such as Russia, China and Brazil, these national amateur leagues can be seen as being equivalent to Russia's Russian Second League Division B, China's Chinese Champions League and Brazil's Brazilian Championship Serie D. Note that unlike these countries the United States has more than one league in what can be considered an unofficial fourth division.)	National Premier Soccer League; 76 clubs – 4 conferences with 11 divisions (Note: Official cross region/conference/division play only occurs in the playoff stage)	USL League Two; 158 clubs – 4 conferences with 19 divisions
National leagues (with automatic Open Cup qualifications)	National Premier Soccer League; 76 clubs – 4 conferences with 11 divisions	United Premier Soccer League; Premier Division (Tier 1) (Note: between the two tiers, UPSL has 250+ clubs) – 4 conferences with 25 divisions
National leagues	American Premier Soccer League; 70 clubs – 8 Conferences (Note: 200+ clubs in APSL system including all affiliated feeder leagues)	None
National leagues	The League for Clubs; 50 clubs – 5 Regions	None
National leagues	NISA Nation; 18 clubs – 3 conferences	None
Regional and premier states leagues (Note: When compared to Russia, a country of continental dimensions like the United States, some regional leagues can be seen as equivalent to the Russian Amateur Football League, which despite the name, is a set of several regional amateur leagues in that country. Some premier states leagues can be also compared to the state championships in Brazil or the leagues of CFA members associations in China.)	USASA Regional Elite Amateur and State Premier Leagues (Note: Some of these leagues are affiliated with NISA Nation. The amount of tiers vary within the individual leagues.); Various Multi-State and State Premier Leagues – 4 regions (Note: No official cross conference/region competition)	United Premier Soccer League; Division 1 (Tier 2) – 4 conferences with 17 divisions
States leagues (Note: When compared to other continental-sized nations, it can be compared to the state championships in Brazil, leagues of CFA member associations in China and the championships of federal subjects in Russia.)	USASA State Leagues Various, many with multiple tiers – 54 state associations	None

=== Men's national soccer cups ===
- U.S. Open Cup – open to all US Soccer sanctioned amateur and professional leagues, though professional teams that are owned by, or whose playing staffs are managed by, higher-level outdoor professional teams are generally barred from entry. However, starting in 2025, MLS clubs may participate in no more than two cup competitions among the CONCACAF Champions Cup, Leagues Cup and U.S. Open Cup per year. If an MLS club is playing in both the CONCACAF Champions Cup and the Leagues Cup and is thereby unable to participate in the U.S. Open Cup, a lower-tier club owned or controlled by such MLS club is eligible to participate in the U.S. Open Cup, if it qualifies. This rule will remain in effect through at least 2026.
- USASA National Amateur Cup – USASA cup tournament open to amateur-only teams from USASA sanctioned leagues. Winner gains entry to the U.S. Open Cup.
- Hank Steinbrecher Cup – contested between the defending champion, the league winners of the NPSL and USL League Two, and the defending champion of the USASA Amateur Cup.

== Women's leagues ==
=== Professional leagues ===
Professional soccer leagues in the United States
Division	League	Abbreviation	Teams	First season
I	National Women's Soccer League	NWSL	16	2013
I	USL Super League	USLS	9	2024
II	NWSL Division 2	NWSL2	8	TBD (pending sanctioning)
II	WPSL Pro	WPSL	12	2027 (pending sanctioning)

The Women's United Soccer Association started playing in 2001, but suspended operations in 2003. It was replaced in 2009 with Women's Professional Soccer. WPS closed after the 2011 season due to a dispute with owners, and the WPSL Elite League was the de facto top tier of women's soccer in 2012. In November 2012 the National Women's Soccer League, sponsored by the United States Soccer Federation, the Canadian Soccer Association and the Mexican Football Federation was announced. The league started play in April 2013. Mexico withdrew from sponsorship of the NWSL once it established its own women's league in 2017.

After the 2019 FIFA Women's World Cup, USL began exploring the idea of creating a professional league to directly compete with NWSL. This effort was initially scaled back to a revival of the amateur W-League. In September 2021, plans for a new USL Super League were announced, initially at Division II status in direct competition to WISL, both of which aimed to launch in 2023. USL later announced it would instead pursue Division I sanctioning for the USL Super League, launching with eight teams in 2024 and an additional five teams in 2025.

==== Number of teams in each league ====
Below is a list of the number of teams sanctioned by the USSF under the current division sanctioning scheme described above.

Pro soccer teams (includes teams outside United States)
Year	Division 1 pro teams (Note: Only includes those sanctioned by USSF as Professional)
	WUSA
2001	8
2002	8
2003	8
2004– 2008	0
	WPS
2009	7
2010	7
2011	6
2012– 2013	0
	NWSL
2013	8
2014	9
2015	9
2016	10
2017	10
2018	9
2019	9
2020	9
2021	10
2022	12
2023	12
	NWSL/USLS
2024	22 (Note: Includes 14 NWSL clubs, and 8 USLS clubs from the 2024–25 season.)
2025	23 (Note: Includes 14 NWSL clubs, and 9 USLS clubs from the 2025–26 season.)
2026	25 (Note: Includes 16 NWSL clubs, and 9 expected USLS clubs from the 2026 season.)

=== Semi-professional and amateur leagues ===
For many years, there were two leagues that acted as an unofficial lower division. The United Soccer League ran the W-League from 1995 to 2015. The Women's Premier Soccer League (WPSL) was founded in 1998. Almost immediately following the demise of the W-League, United Women's Soccer was founded with orphan W-League teams and WPSL breakaways. UWS then formed a U23 reserve league, UWS2, in early 2020. The USL announced the revival of their amateur women's league as USL W League in June 2021, called by USL as "pre-professional", which began play in 2022.

Amateur leagues not sanctioned by U.S. Soccer (Note: The tiers or levels here are approximate and not specifically so designated by the USSF.)
USASA affiliated		No affiliation
United Women's Soccer (UWS); 25 clubs – 4 conferences	Women's Premier Soccer League (WPSL); 151 clubs – 4 regions with 24 conferences	USL W League (USLW); 93 clubs – 4 conferences with 15 divisions
United Women's Soccer 2 (UWS2); 10 clubs – 2 conferences	Women's Premier Soccer League Division II (WPSLII) 51 clubs – 6 conferences	USL W League (USLW); 93 clubs – 4 conferences with 15 divisions
United States Adult Soccer Association (USASA); 55 state associations in 4 regions See List of USASA affiliated leagues for complete list Region I Region II; Region III; Region IV

=== Women's national soccer cups ===
- NWSL Challenge Cup – open to NWSL teams
- USASA National Women's Open – open to WPSL and UWS teams
- USASA National Women's Amateur – open to all USASA-affiliated women's teams

== Indoor soccer ==
Indoor soccer in North America is governed by the Pan-American Minifootball Federation (PAMF), a member of the World Minifootball Federation (WMF).

Leagues/divisions
Division	Men's		Women's	
I	Major Arena Soccer League (MASL); 10 clubs	Major League Indoor Soccer (MLIS); 13 clubs	Major Arena Soccer League Women (MASLW); 21 clubs	Women's Major League Indoor Soccer (WMLIS); 8 clubs
II	Major Arena Soccer League 2 (MASL2); 16 clubs	Western Indoor Soccer League (WISL) 6 clubs	Western Indoor Soccer League Women's (WISLW) 4 clubs	
III	Major Arena Soccer League 3 (MASL3); 27 clubs			

== See also ==
- Soccer in the United States
- List of soccer clubs in the United States
- Record attendances in United States club soccer
- Canadian soccer league system
- The League for Clubs
