= Kansas City Pro Volleyball =

American volleyball team

- Sport: Volleyball
- Founded: 2024
- League: Major League Volleyball
- Based in: Kansas City, Missouri
- Arena: TBD
- Owner: Missy and Kent McCarthy
- Website: kcprovolleyball.com

Kansas City Pro Volleyball team is a women's professional indoor volleyball team based in Kansas City, Missouri. The team plans to enter Major League Volleyball (MLV) as an expansion team at an undetermined date.

== History ==
On November 8, 2023, Kansas City was announced as a 2025 expansion team in the Pro Volleyball Federation, owned by Missy and Kent McCarthy. The team has named Lori Thomas as Team President.

In July, 2024, the team announced it would not be launching for the 2025 season. The actual launch date remains undetermined.
