= 2015 New York Red Bulls II season =

New York Red Bulls II
2015 season
- Sporting Director: Ali Curtis
- Head coach: John Wolyniec
- USL: Conference: TBD; Overall: TBD
- USL Playoffs: TBD
- U.S. Open Cup: Second round
- Top goalscorer: League: Marius Obekop (6); All: Marius Obekop (6)
- Highest home attendance: 1,028 (Apr. 4 vs. Toronto II)
- Lowest home attendance: 355 (Apr. 22 vs. Richmond)
- Average home league attendance: 592
Home colors	Away colors

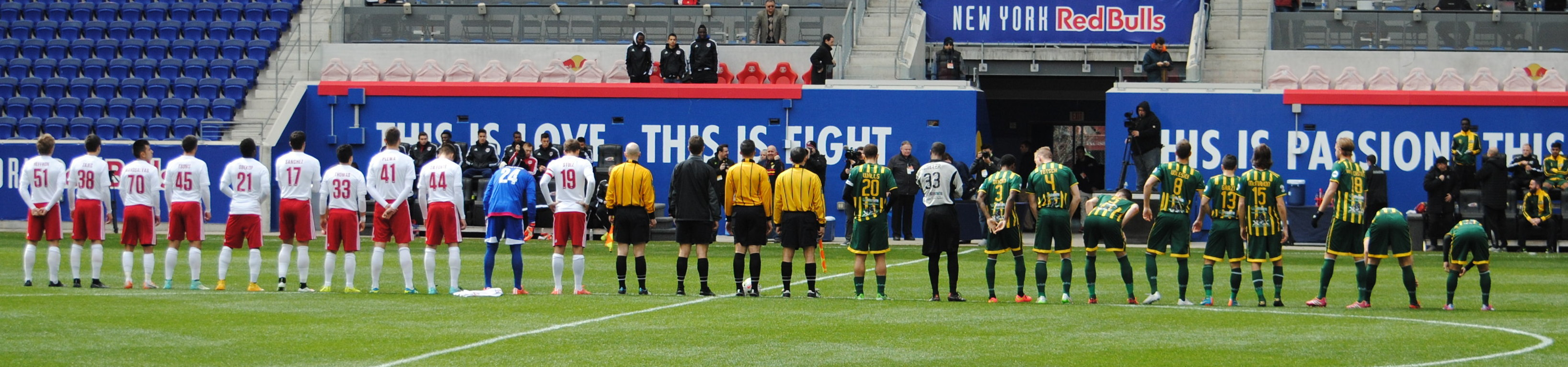
Opening Match, March 2015

The 2015 New York Red Bulls II season was the club's first season of existence, and their first in United Soccer League, the third-tier of the American soccer pyramid. The Red Bulls II played in the Eastern Division of USL.

== Club ==
=== Coaching staff ===
Position	Staff
Head Coach	(United States) John Wolyniec

=== Roster ===
No.	Pos.	Nation	Player
17	MF	USA	Manolo Sanchez (on loan from New York Red Bulls)
19	MF	GER	Leo Stolz (on loan from New York Red Bulls)
21	MF	CMR	Marius Obekop (on loan from New York Red Bulls)
24	GK	USA	Santiago Castaño (on loan from New York Red Bulls)
30	MF	USA	Dan Metzger
33	MF	USA	Jamie Thomas
36	MF	HAI	Derrick Etienne Jr. (call up from New York Red Bulls Academy)
37	FW	USA	Juan Sebastían Sánchez (call up from New York Red Bulls Academy)
38	MF	USA	Kyle Zajec (call up from New York Red Bulls Academy)
39	DF	USA	Marcello Borges (call up from New York Red Bulls Academy)
41	MF	POL	Konrad Plewa
43	FW	USA	Ethan Lochner (call up from New York Red Bulls Academy)
44	DF	USA	Mike da Fonte
45	FW	USA	Chris Tsonis
51	DF	ENG	Colin Heffron
56	MF	USA	Alex Clay
66	DF	USA	Tyler Adams
70	MF	USA	Victor Manosalvas
74	GK	DOM	Rafael Diaz
77	MF	HON	Franklin Castellanos
88	MF	COL	Dan Bedoya
93	MF	NGR	Bolu Akinyode

== Transfers ==
=== In ===
No.	Pos	Player	Transferred From	Fee	Date	Source

=== Out ===
No.	Pos	Player	Transferred To	Fee	Date	Source

== Competitions ==
=== USL ===
==== Standings ====
Pos	Team	Pld	W	D	L	GF	GA	GD	Pts	Qualification
1	Rochester Rhinos (C, X)	28	17	10	1	40	15	+25	61	Conference semi-finals
2	Louisville City FC	28	14	6	8	55	34	+21	48	Conference semi-finals
3	Charleston Battery	28	12	10	6	43	28	+15	46	First round
4	New York Red Bulls II	28	12	6	10	46	45	+1	42	First round
5	Pittsburgh Riverhounds	28	11	8	9	53	42	+11	41	First round
6	Richmond Kickers	28	10	11	7	41	35	+6	41	First round
7	Charlotte Independence	28	10	10	8	38	35	+3	40	
8	Harrisburg City Islanders	28	11	6	11	49	53	−4	39	
9	Saint Louis FC	28	8	9	11	30	40	−10	33	
10	FC Montreal	28	8	4	16	32	46	−14	28	
11	Toronto FC II	28	6	5	17	26	52	−26	23	
12	Wilmington Hammerheads	28	3	10	15	22	42	−20	19	

Source: 2015 USL schedule
Rules for classification: 1) head-to-head; 2) total wins; 3) total goal differential; 4) total goals scored; 5) disciplinary points; 6) away goals scored; 7) away goal differential; 8) home goals scored; 9) home goal differential; 10) coin toss or drawing of lots
(C) Champions; (X) Regular Season League Champion

==== Results ====
March 28 1	New York Red Bulls II	0–0	Rochester Rhinos	Harrison
14:00 EST		Report	Garzi (yellow card) 31'; Rolfe (yellow card) 43'; Ringhof (yellow card) 80'	Stadium: Red Bull Arena; Attendance: 547; Referee: Ryan Dos Reis

April 4 2	New York Red Bulls II	4–1	Toronto FC II	Harrison
15:30 EST	Abang 8'; McLaws 39'; Lade (yellow card) 48'; Jean-Baptiste (yellow card) 51'; Obekop 75'; Stolz 86'	Report	Hamilton (yellow card) 14'; Nunes (yellow card) 18'; Lade 52' (o.g.)	Stadium: Red Bull Arena; Attendance: 1,028; Referee: Neil Barbulescu

April 12 3	New York Red Bulls II	0–3	Wilmington Hammerheads	Harrison
16:00 EST	Castaño (red card) 85'	Report	Zimmerman 22', 43'; Mendoza 88' (pen.); Poku (yellow card) 89'	Stadium: Red Bull Arena; Attendance: 566; Referee: Krys Larwa

April 18 4	Charleston Battery	1–1	New York Red Bulls II	Charleston
19:30 EST	Rodriguez 45'; Chang (yellow card) 60'; Garbanzo (yellow card) 69'; Woodbine (yellow card) 79'; Ferguson (yellow card) 90'	Report	Abang 68'	Stadium: Blackbaud Stadium; Attendance: 4,188; Referee: Daniel Fitzgerald

April 22 5	New York Red Bulls II	0–1	Richmond Kickers	Harrison
19:30 EST	Lade (yellow card) 84'	Report	Ownby 50'; Durkin (yellow card) 70'; Callahan (yellow card) 75'	Stadium: Red Bull Arena; Attendance: 355; Referee: Jaime Herrera

April 26 6	Rochester Rhinos	2–0	New York Red Bulls II	Rochester
14:05 EST	Obasi (yellow card) 38'; Dixon 40'; Mendoza 67'; Garzi (yellow card) 84'	Report	Jean-Baptiste (yellow card) 79'; Etienne (yellow card) 90'	Stadium: Sahlen's Stadium; Attendance: 6,184; Referee: Brandon Artis

May 3 7	New York Red Bulls II	3–2	Pittsburgh Riverhounds	Harrison
14:00 EST	Okiomah 6' (o.g.); Sanchez 66'; Wallace 90+4'	Report	Vincent 8', 84'; Dallman (yellow card) 31'; Arena (yellow card) 72'	Stadium: Red Bull Arena; Attendance: 398; Referee: Ernie Constantine

May 9 8	New York Red Bulls II	1–2	Harrisburg City Islanders	Harrison
14:00 EST	Jean-Baptiste 9', (yellow card) 68'; Stolz (yellow card) 65' (yellow-red card) 86'	Report	McLaughlin 23'; Shaffer (yellow card) 43'; Barrill 90+1'; Jankouskas (yellow card) 90+3'	Stadium: Red Bull Arena; Attendance: 380; Referee: Randall Kelley

May 17 9	New York Red Bulls II	1–1	Charleston Battery	New York City
19:00 EST	Abang 6'; Adams (yellow card) 90'	Report	Kelly (yellow card) 41'; Woodbine (yellow card) 45'; Boyd (yellow card) 45+' vanSchaik (yellow card) 74'; Portillo 90+1' (pen.)	Stadium: Rocco B. Commisso Soccer Stadium; Attendance: 458

May 24 10	New York Red Bulls II	3–2	FC Montreal	Harrison
20:00 EST	Abang 13'; Sukunda 49' (o.g.); Etienne 69'; Jean-Baptiste (yellow card) 90'; Bedoya (yellow card) 90'	Report; Box Score	Lajoie-Gravelle 20'; Gagnon-Laparé (yellow card) 36'; Temguia (yellow card) 48'; Riggi 81'; Belguendouz (red card) 90'	Stadium: Red Bull Arena; Attendance: 1,004

May 30 11	Richmond Kickers	4–2	New York Red Bulls II	Richmond
19:00 EST	Sekyere (yellow card) 10'; Ownby 14'; Yeisley 37'; Garner 40'; Davis IV 68' (pen.)	Report	da Fonte (yellow card) 26'; Etienne 48'; Tsonis (yellow card) 72', (goal) 80'	Stadium: City Stadium; Attendance: 2,954; Referee: Benjamin Hichak

June 6 12	FC Montreal	2–2	New York Red Bulls II	Montreal
18:30 EST	Zoue (yellow card) 22'; Riggi 25'; Houache (yellow card) 79'; Ndiaye 90'	Report	Sanchez 4'; Stolz 45' da Fonte (yellow card) 90'	Stadium: Stade Saputo; Attendance: 306; Referee: Robert Schaap

June 13 13	Wilmington Hammerheads FC	0–1	New York Red Bulls II	Wilmington
19:00 EST	Arnoux (yellow card) 80'; Anunga (yellow card) 87'; Jackson (red card) 90'	Report	Tsonis 72'; Etienne (yellow card) 90'	Stadium: Legion Stadium; Attendance: 2,622; Referee: Dustin Thorne

June 20 14	Louisville City FC	0–2	New York Red Bulls II	Louisville
19:30 EST	Montano (yellow card) 46'; Fernandez (yellow card) 69'	Report	Plewa 4'; Jean-Baptiste (yellow card) 44'; Etienne 50'; Adams (yellow card) 54'; Bedoya (yellow card) 63'; Akinyode (yellow card) 77'; Castaño (yellow card) 89' da Fonte (yellow card) 90'	Stadium: Louisville Slugger Field; Attendance: 7,454; Referee: Esteban Rosano

June 27 15	Saint Louis FC	1–4	New York Red Bulls II	Fenton
20:30 EST	Lynch 59'; Renken (yellow card) 90'	Report	Obekop 8'; Plewa 56', 90'; Tsonis (yellow card) 76'; Castellanos 83' da Fonte (yellow card) 87'	Stadium: World Wide Technology Soccer Park; Attendance: 5,260; Referee: Rubiel Vazquez

July 4 16	Pittsburgh Riverhounds	3–0	New York Red Bulls II	Pittsburgh
19:00 EST	Vincent 41'; Kerr (yellow card) 55'; Pasher 73'; Vincent 81'	Report		Stadium: Highmark Stadium; Referee: Brandon Artis

July 12 17	New York Red Bulls II	0–2	Harrisburg City Islanders	Harrison
17:00 EST		Report	Foster 23'; Valles 87' (pen.)	Stadium: Red Bull Arena

July 18 18	Harrisburg City Islanders	0–2	New York Red Bulls II	Harrisburg
19:00 EST		Report	Stolz 75'; Bedoya 80'	Stadium: Skyline Sports Complex

July 25 19	New York Red Bulls II	4–3	Richmond Kickers	Harrison
16:00 EST	Tsonis 11', 45'; Sanchez 40'; Bedoya 81'	Report	Yeisley 18', 23'; Shiffman 89'	Stadium: Red Bull Arena

August 2 20	New York Red Bulls II	2–1	Saint Louis FC	Hanover
17:00 EST	Obekop 40'; Castellanos 90'		Ciesiulka 72'	Stadium: Red Bull Training Facility

August 5 21	Charlotte Independence	2 -2	New York Red Bulls II	Charlotte
19:30 EST	Badji 24', 46'		Castellanos 5'; Stolz 72'	Stadium: Ramblewood Soccer Complex

August 8 22	Wilmington Hammerheads FC	4–2	New York Red Bulls II	Wilmington
19:00 EST	Defregger 18', 34'; Lawal 45'; Ackley 61'		Obekop 30'; Tsonis 81'	Stadium: Legion Stadium

August 12 23	New York Red Bulls II	1–1	Charlotte Independence	Harrison
19:30 EST	Bonomo 73'		Jackson 23'	Stadium: Red Bull Arena

August 22 24	Toronto FC II	0–2	New York Red Bulls II	Vaughan
20:00 EST			Bonomo 47'; Williams 78'	Stadium: Ontario Soccer Centre

August 29 25	New York Red Bulls II	2–0	Wilmington Hammerheads FC	Harrison
17:00 EST	Sanchez 22'; Obekop 29'			Stadium: Red Bull Arena

September 5 26	New York Red Bulls II	3–2	Louisville City FC	Harrison
20:30 EST	Sanchez 26'; Akinyode 86'		McCabe 19'; Fondy 40'	Stadium: Red Bull Arena

September 9 27	FC Montreal	2–0	New York Red Bulls II	Montreal
18:30 EST	Riggi 80', 90'			Stadium: Stade Saputo

September 19 28	Rochester Rhinos	3–2	New York Red Bulls II	Rochester
19:05 EST				Stadium: Sahlen's Stadium

=== U.S. Open Cup ===
May 20 Second round	Jersey Express	1–0	New York Red Bulls II	Newark
20:00 ET	Karcz 59'; De Oliveiro (yellow card) 83'	Report	Thomas (yellow card) 37'	Stadium: J. Malcolm Simon Stadium

=== USL Playoffs ===
September 26, 2015	New York Red Bulls II	4–2 (a.e.t.)	Pittsburgh Riverhounds	Harrison, New Jersey
5:00 pm EDT	Sanchez 62'; Ouimette 102', 115'; Bedoya 119'	Report	Hunt 15', 96'	Stadium: Red Bull Arena; Attendance: 915; Referee: Jaime Herrera

October 3, 2015	Rochester Rhinos	2–0	New York Red Bulls II	Rochester, New York
7:05 pm EDT	Dos Santos 48', 69'	Report		Stadium: Sahlen's Stadium; Attendance: 6,378; Referee: Greg Dopka

== Player statistics ==
=== Top scorers ===
Place	Position	Number	Name	USL	USL Cup	U.S. Open Cup	Total
1	MF	21	(Cameroon) Marius Obekop	6	0	0	6
2	MF	17	(United States) Manolo Sanchez	4	1	0	5
2	FW	45	(United States) Chris Tsonis	5	0	0	5
3	FW	9	(Cameroon) Anatole Abang	4	0	0	4
3	MF	19	(Germany) Leo Stolz	4	0	0	4
3	MF	88	(Colombia) Dan Bedoya	3	1	0	4
4	FW	29	(United States) Stefano Bonomo	3	0	0	3
4	MF	36	(Haiti) Derrick Etienne	3	0	0	3
4	MF	41	(Poland) Konrad Plewa	3	0	0	3
4	MF	77	(Honduras) Franklin Castellanos	3	0	0	3
5	DF	22	(Canada) Karl Ouimette	0	2	0	2
6	DF	3	(United States) Shawn McLaws	1	0	0	1
6	DF	6	(United States) Anthony Wallace	1	0	0	1
6	DF	35	(United States) Andrew Jean-Baptiste	1	0	0	1
6	FW	37	(United States) Juan Sebastían Sánchez	1	0	0	1
6	MF	80	(Jamaica) Devon Williams	1	0	0	1
6	MF	93	(Nigeria) Bolu Akinyode	1	0	0	1
Total				44	4	0	48

As of 3 October 2015.
