= 2015 New York Red Bulls season =

New York Red Bulls
2015 season
- Sporting Director: Ali Curtis
- Head coach: Jesse Marsch
- Major League Soccer: Conference: 1st Overall: 1st
- MLS Cup playoffs: Conference finals
- U.S. Open Cup: Quarterfinals
- Top goalscorer: League: Bradley Wright-Phillips (17); All: Bradley Wright-Phillips (18)
- Highest home attendance: 25,217 (May 10 vs. New York City)
- Lowest home attendance: League: 12,540 (Apr 29 vs. Colorado); All: 5,585 (June 16 vs. Atlanta)
- Average home league attendance: League: 19,242; All: 17,291
Home colors	Away colors

The 2015 New York Red Bulls season was the franchise's twentieth season in Major League Soccer, the top division of soccer in the United States.

== Roster transactions ==
=== In ===
#	Position	Player	Signed from	Details	Date	Source
—	MF	(United States) Sal Zizzo	(United States) New York City FC	In exchange for Ryan Meara on loan	December 11, 2014	
—	MF	(United States) Sean Davis	Academy	Homegrown player	December 11, 2014	
—	GK	(United States) Kyle Reynish	(United States) Chicago Fire		January 20, 2015	
—	DF	(Haiti) Andrew Jean-Baptiste	(United States) Chivas USA		January 27, 2015	
—	DF	(France) Damien Perrinelle	Free Agent	Re-signed with the club	January 27, 2015	
—	DF	(France) Ronald Zubar	(France) AC Ajaccio		January 27, 2015	
—	MF	(Brazil) Felipe Martins	(Canada) Montreal Impact	In exchange for Eric Alexander, Ambroise Oyongo and an international player spot	January 27, 2015	
—	MF	(United States) Sacha Kljestan	(Belgium) Anderlecht		January 28, 2015	
—	FW	(United States) Mike Grella	(United States) Carolina RailHawks		February 17, 2015	
—	DF	(Canada) Karl Ouimette	(Canada) Montreal Impact		March 5, 2015	
—	ST	(Cameroon) Anatole Abang	(Cameroon) Rainbow F.C.		March 5, 2015	
—	MF	(Jamaica) Dane Richards	(Norway) Bodø/Glimt		March 7, 2015	
—	DF	(Jamaica) Kemar Lawrence	(Jamaica) Harbour View		March 16, 2015	
—	MF	(Cameroon) Marius Obekop	Free Agent	Re-signed with the club	March 21, 2015	
—	DF	(United States) Anthony Wallace	(United States) Tampa Bay Rowdies		March 27, 2015	
—	MF	(England) Shaun Wright-Phillips	(England) Queens Park Rangers		July 27, 2015	
—	MF	(Argentina) Gonzalo Verón	(Argentina) San Lorenzo	$2,200,000 Transfer Fee	August 5, 2015	

=== Out ===
#	Position	Player	Signed by	Details	Date	Source
14	FW	(France) Thierry Henry	Retired		December 1, 2014	
55	DF	(France) Damien Perrinelle	(United States) New York Red Bulls	Option Declined	December 2, 2014	
32	DF	(Uganda) Ibrahim Sekagya	Retired	Option Declined	December 2, 2014	
27	DF	(Japan) Kosuke Kimura	(Poland) Widzew Łódź	Option Declined	December 2, 2014	
2	DF	(England) Richard Eckersley	(England) Oldham Athletic	Option Declined	December 2, 2014	
15	MF	(United States) Bobby Convey	Free Agent	Option Declined	December 2, 2014	
13	MF	(Cameroon) Marius Obekop	(United States) New York Red Bulls	Option Declined	December 2, 2014	
39	FW	(France) Saër Sène	(England) Blackpool FC	Option Declined	December 2, 2014	
4	DF	(Colombia) Jámison Olave	(United States) Real Salt Lake	Traded for allocation money	December 10, 2014	
3	DF	(Cameroon) Ambroise Oyongo	(Canada) Montreal Impact	In exchange for Felipe Martins	January 27, 2015	
12	MF	(United States) Eric Alexander	(Canada) Montreal Impact	In exchange for Felipe Martins	January 27, 2015	
17	MF	(Australia) Tim Cahill	(China) Shanghai Shenhua	Free	February 2, 2015	
19	MF	(United States) Eric Stevenson	(United States) Cincinnati	Waived	February 13, 2015	
6	MF	(United States) Ian Christianson	(Canada) Whitecaps FC 2	Waived	February 17, 2015	
5	DF	(Spain) Armando Lozano	(Spain) Elche CF	Waived	March 7, 2015	
21	MF	(Spain) Ruben Bover	(United States) New York Cosmos B	Waived	March 12, 2015	
23	MF	(Colombia) Michael Bustamante	(United States) Charlotte Independence	Waived	March 21, 2015	
-	FW	(France) Péguy Luyindula	Retired		May 31, 2015	
35	DF	(Haiti) Andrew Jean-Baptiste	(Spain) Estrella San Agustín	Waived	June 26, 2015	

=== Loaned out ===
#	Position	Player	Loaned to	Details	Date	Source
18	GK	(United States) Ryan Meara	(United States) New York City FC	In exchange for Sal Zizzo	December 11, 2014	
91	MF	(Jamaica) Dane Richards	(United States) Indy Eleven		July 10, 2015	

=== Draft picks ===
Round	#	Position	Player	College/Club Team	Reference
1 (18)	—	MF	(Germany) Leo Stolz	UCLA	
2 (39)	—	FW	(United States) Stefano Bonomo	University of California, Berkeley	
3 (59)	—	DF	(United States) Shawn McLaws	Coastal Carolina University	
4 (79)	—	MF	(United States) Manolo Sanchez	Clemson University	

== Team information ==
=== Squad information ===
As of August 5, 2015.

No.	Name	Nationality	Position	Date of birth (age)	Previous club
Goalkeepers
18	Kyle Reynish	(United States)	GK	November 3, 1983 (aged 31)	(United States) Chicago Fire
24	Santiago Castaño	(United States)	GK	April 14, 1995 (aged 19)	Academy
31	Luis Robles	(United States)	GK	May 11, 1984 (aged 30)	(Germany) Karlsruher SC
Defenders
3	Shawn McLaws	(United States)	RB	March 9, 1993 (aged 21)	(United States) Coastal Carolina University
5	Connor Lade	(United States)	RB	November 16, 1989 (aged 25)	(United States) St. John's University
6	Anthony Wallace	(United States)	LB	January 26, 1989 (aged 26)	(United States) Tampa Bay Rowdies
7	Roy Miller	(Costa Rica)	LB	November 24, 1984 (aged 30)	(Norway) Rosenborg
20	Matt Miazga	(United States)	CB	July 19, 1995 (aged 19)	Academy
22	Karl Ouimette	(Canada)	CB/LB	June 18, 1992 (aged 22)	(Canada) Montreal Impact
23	Ronald Zubar	(France)	CB	September 20, 1985 (aged 29)	(France) AC Ajaccio
25	Chris Duvall	(United States)	RB	September 10, 1991 (aged 23)	(United States) Wake Forest University
55	Damien Perrinelle	(France)	CB	September 12, 1983 (aged 31)	(France) FC Istres
92	Kemar Lawrence	(Jamaica)	LB	September 17, 1992 (aged 22)	(Jamaica) Harbour View
Midfielders
8	Felipe	(Brazil)	CM	September 30, 1990 (aged 24)	(Canada) Montreal Impact
10	Lloyd Sam	(Ghana)	RW	September 27, 1984 (aged 30)	(England) Leeds United
11	Dax McCarty	(United States)	CM	April 30, 1987 (aged 27)	(United States) D.C. United
13	Mike Grella	(United States)	LW	January 23, 1987 (aged 28)	(United States) Carolina RailHawks
15	Sal Zizzo	(United States)	RW/LW	April 3, 1987 (aged 27)	(United States) Sporting Kansas City
16	Sacha Kljestan	(United States)	CM	September 9, 1985 (aged 29)	(Belgium) Anderlecht
17	Manolo Sanchez	(United States)	MF	November 10, 1991 (aged 23)	(United States) Clemson University
19	Leo Stolz	(Germany)	MF	February 15, 1991 (aged 24)	(United States) UCLA
21	Marius Obekop	(Cameroon)	MF	December 19, 1994 (aged 20)	(Cameroon) Renaissance
27	Sean Davis	(United States)	CM	February 8, 1993 (aged 22)	Academy
30	Gonzalo Verón	(Argentina)	RW/CM	December 24, 1989 (aged 25)	(Argentina) San Lorenzo
98	Shaun Wright-Phillips	(England)	RW/LW	October 25, 1981 (aged 33)	(England) Queens Park Rangers
Forwards
9	Anatole Abang	(Cameroon)	FW	July 6, 1996 (aged 18)	(Cameroon) Rainbow F.C.
99	Bradley Wright-Phillips	(England)	FW	March 12, 1985 (aged 29)	(England) Charlton Athletic

== Competitions ==
=== Preseason ===
February 1 Scrimmage	South Florida Bulls	0–4	New York Red Bulls	Davenport, Florida
		Report	Wright-Phillips 12'; Grella 17'; Zizzo 24'; Abang 58'	Stadium: ChampionsGate Sports Complex; Attendance: Closed-door

February 5 Scrimmage	New York Red Bulls	2–0	Toronto FC	Davenport, Florida
2:30p.m. EST	Kljestan 24'; McCarty 42'	Report		Stadium: ChampionsGate Sports Complex; Attendance: Closed-door
Note: Two 30-minute halves.

February 5 Scrimmage	Jacksonville Armada FC	4–1	New York Red Bulls	Davenport, Florida
4:00p.m. EST	Johnson 4'; Castrillón 8'; Millien 20'; Roserie 57'	Report	Stevenson 30'	Stadium: ChampionsGate Sports Complex; Attendance: Closed-door
Note: Three 25-minute periods.

February 18 IMG Suncoast; Pro Classic	New York Red Bulls	1–1	HB Køge	Bradenton, Florida
	Grella 36'	Report	Zinckernagel 62'	Stadium: IMG Academy

February 21 IMG Suncoast; Pro Classic	New York Red Bulls	1–0	Oklahoma City Energy FC	Bradenton, Florida
	Sanchez 10'	Report		Stadium: IMG Academy

February 25 IMG Suncoast; Pro Classic	New York Red Bulls	2–0	Toronto FC	Bradenton, Florida
	Wright-Phillips 23'; Zizzo 47'	Report		Stadium: IMG Academy

February 28 IMG Suncoast; Pro Classic	New York Red Bulls	1–3	Philadelphia Union	Bradenton, Florida
	Wright-Phillips 80'	Report	Wenger 2'; Aristeguieta 32'; Wenger 40'	Stadium: IMG Academy

=== Major League Soccer season ===
March 8 1	Sporting Kansas City	1–1	New York Red Bulls	Kansas City, KS
7:00 p.m. EDT	Opara 50'	Report	Sam 54'	Stadium: Sporting Park; Attendance: 19,784; Referee: Baldomero Toledo

March 22 2	New York Red Bulls	2–0	D.C. United	Harrison, NJ
5:00 p.m. EDT	Wright-Phillips 25'; Sam 71'	Report		Stadium: Red Bull Arena; Attendance: 21,036; Referee: Alan Kelly

March 28 3	Columbus Crew	1–2	New York Red Bulls	Columbus, OH
7:30 p.m. EDT	Tchani 58'	Report	Wright Phillips 49' (pen.); Grella 67'	Stadium: Mapfre Stadium; Attendance: 18,333; Referee: Sorin Stoica

April 11 4	D.C. United	2–2	New York Red Bulls	Washington, D.C.
7:00 p.m. EDT	Kitchen 26', 67'	Report	Perrinelle 68'; Sam 90'	Stadium: RFK Stadium; Attendance: 16,304; Referee: Jose Rivero

April 17 5	New York Red Bulls	2–0	San Jose Earthquakes	Harrison, NJ
7:00 p.m. EDT	Kljestan 29'; Grella 35'	Report		Stadium: Red Bull Arena; Attendance: 16,406; Referee: Jair Marrufo

April 26 6	New York Red Bulls	1–1	Los Angeles Galaxy	Harrison, NJ
5:00 p.m. EDT	Felipe 58'	Report	Jamieson 9'	Stadium: Red Bull Arena; Attendance: 20,062; Referee: Ted Unkel

April 29 7	New York Red Bulls	1–1	Colorado Rapids	Harrison, NJ
7:00 p.m. EDT	Wright Phillips 30' (pen.)	Report	Torres 25'	Stadium: Red Bull Arena; Attendance: 12,540; Referee: Mark Geiger

May 2 8	New England Revolution	2–1	New York Red Bulls	Foxborough, MA
7:30 p.m. EDT	Davies 9'; Bunbury 60'	Report	Kljestan 73'	Stadium: Gillette Stadium; Attendance: 18,296; Referee: Marcos de Oliveira

May 10 9	New York Red Bulls	2–1	New York City FC	Harrison, NJ
7:00 p.m. EDT	Wright-Phillips 4', 52'	Report	Mullins 76'	Stadium: Red Bull Arena; Attendance: 25,217; Referee: Alan Kelly

May 15 10	FC Dallas	0–0	New York Red Bulls	Frisco, TX
9:00 p.m. EDT		Report		Stadium: Toyota Stadium; Attendance: 12,640; Referee: Ricardo Salazar

May 24 11	New York Red Bulls	0–2	Philadelphia Union	Harrison, NJ
5:00 p.m. EDT		Report	Nogueira 57'; Sapong 62'	Stadium: Red Bull Arena; Attendance: 20,190

May 31 12	Seattle Sounders FC	2–1	New York Red Bulls	Seattle, WA
5:00 p.m. EDT	Pappa 69'; Barrett 90+1'	Report	Sam 36'	Stadium: CenturyLink Field; Attendance: 40,194; Referee: Jose Rivero

June 5 13	Houston Dynamo	4–2	New York Red Bulls	Houston, TX
9:00 p.m. EDT	García 59'; Clark 72'; Bruin 80', 90+3'	Report	Grella 42'; Abang 90'	Stadium: BBVA Compass Stadium; Attendance: 22,356; Referee: Marcos de Oliveira

June 20 14	New York Red Bulls	1–2	Vancouver Whitecaps FC	Harrison, NJ
7:00 p.m. EDT	Abang 82'	Report	Manneh 15'; Froese 77'	Stadium: Red Bull Arena; Attendance: 20,053; Referee: Bum

June 24 15	New York Red Bulls	1–0	Real Salt Lake	Harrison, NJ
7:30 p.m. EDT	Grella 4'	Report		Stadium: Red Bull Arena; Attendance: 15,844; Referee: David Gantar

June 28 16	New York City FC	1–3	New York Red Bulls	New York, NY
5:00 p.m. EDT	McNamara 6'	Report	Wright-Phillips 47'; Duvall 52'; Miazga 73'	Stadium: Yankee Stadium; Attendance: 48,047; Referee: Mark Geiger

July 4 17	Columbus Crew	2–1	New York Red Bulls	Columbus, OH
7:30 p.m. EDT	Finlay 33', 74'	Report	Abang 8'	Stadium: Mapfre Stadium; Attendance: 14,429; Referee: Juan Guzman

July 11 18	New York Red Bulls	4–1	New England Revolution	Harrison, NJ
7:00 p.m. EDT	Wright-Phillips 4', 12'; Sam 9'; Wallace 56'		Dorman 37'	Stadium: Red Bull Arena; Attendance: 18,640; Referee: Alan Kelly

July 18 19	Orlando City SC	0–2	New York Red Bulls	Orlando, FL
7:30 p.m. EDT		Report	Kljestan 21'; Grella 90'	Stadium: Orlando Citrus Bowl Stadium; Attendance: 33,518; Referee: Fotis Bazakos

August 1 20	Philadelphia Union	1–3	New York Red Bulls	Chester, PA
7:00 p.m. EDT	Le Toux 73'		Kljestan 66' (pen.); Wright-Phillips 74'; Abang 90'	Stadium: PPL Park

August 5 21	Montreal Impact	1–1	New York Red Bulls	Montreal
8:00 p.m. EDT	Oduro 42'		Sam 52'	Stadium: Saputo Stadium; Referee: Ted Unkel

August 9 22	New York Red Bulls	2–0	New York City FC	Harrison, NJ
7:00 p.m. EDT	Wright-Phillips 21'; Felipe 85'	Report		Stadium: Red Bull Arena; Attendance: 25,219; Referee: Ismail Elfath

August 15 23	New York Red Bulls	3–0	Toronto FC	Harrison, NJ
7:00 p.m. EDT	Wright-Phillips 27'; Wallace 65'; Verón 90'	Report		Stadium: Red Bull Arena; Attendance: 20,685; Referee: Baldomero Toledo

August 26 24	Chicago Fire	3–2	New York Red Bulls	Bridgeview, IL
8:30 p.m. EDT	Igboananike 22', 73'; Nyarko 41'	Report	Kljestan 10' (pen.); Zubar 49'	Stadium: Toyota Park; Attendance: 11,196; Referee: Allen Chapman

August 30 25	New York Red Bulls	3–0	D.C. United	Harrison, NJ
7:00 p.m. EDT	Sam 33'; Wright-Phillips 42', 64'	Report		Stadium: Red Bull Arena; Attendance: 22,645; Referee: Jair Marrufo

September 11 26	New York Red Bulls	3–2	Chicago Fire	Harrison, NJ
7:00 p.m. EDT	Wright-Phillips 28'; Grella 38'; Kljestan 71' (pen.)	Report	Larentowicz 14' (pen.); Accam 26'	Stadium: Red Bull Arena; Attendance: 17,184; Referee: Armando Villareal

September 16 27	New England Revolution	2–1	New York Red Bulls	Foxborough, MA
7:30 p.m. EDT	Fagundez 2'; Rowe 65'		Grella 6'	Stadium: Gillette Stadium; Attendance: 10,997; Referee: Ismail Elfath

September 20 28	Portland Timbers	0–2	New York Red Bulls	Portland, OR
5:00 p.m. EDT		Report	Felipe 43'; Perrinelle 45'	Stadium: Providence Park; Attendance: 21,144; Referee: Drew Fischer

September 25 29	New York Red Bulls	2–5	Orlando City SC	Harrison, NJ
7:00 p.m. EDT	McCarty 29'; Sam 58'	Report	Larin 24', 43', 61'; Perrinelle 46' (o.g.); Rochez 90'	Stadium: Red Bull Arena; Attendance: 20,695; Referee: Jorge Gonzalez

October 3 30	New York Red Bulls	2–1	Columbus Crew	Harrison, NJ
7:00 p.m. EDT	Sam 12'; Wright-Phillips 21'	Report	Meram 9'	Stadium: Red Bull Arena; Attendance: Alan Kelly

October 7 31	New York Red Bulls	2–1	Montreal Impact	Harrison, NJ
7:30 p.m. EDT	Kljestan 16' (pen.); Sam 39'	Report	Drogba 68' (pen.)	Stadium: Red Bull Arena; Attendance: 14,961; Referee: Ted Unkel

October 14 32	Toronto FC	2–1	New York Red Bulls	Toronto, ON
7:00 p.m. EDT	Gómez 51'; Giovinco 78'	Report	S. Wright-Phillips 86'	Stadium: BMO Field; Attendance: 18,143; Referee: Nobody

October 18 33	New York Red Bulls	4–1	Philadelphia Union	Harrison, NJ
TBD EDT	Grella 1', 17'; Wright-Phillips 4'; Lawrence 44'	Report	Le Toux 55'	Stadium: Red Bull Arena; Attendance: 21,080; Referee: Ismail Elfath

October 25 34	Chicago Fire	1–2	New York Red Bulls	Bridgeview, IL
5:00 p.m. EDT	Gilberto 78'	Report	Wright-Phillips 8'; Kljestan 35' (pen.)	Stadium: Toyota Park; Attendance: 19,850; Referee: Ricardo Salazar

=== Tables ===
==== Eastern Conference Table ====
Pos	Team	Pld	W	L	T	GF	GA	GD	Pts	Qualification
1	New York Red Bulls	34	18	10	6	62	43	+19	60	MLS Cup Conference Semifinals
2	Columbus Crew SC	34	15	11	8	58	53	+5	53	MLS Cup Conference Semifinals
3	Montreal Impact	34	15	13	6	48	44	+4	51	MLS Cup Knockout Round
4	D.C. United	34	15	13	6	43	45	−2	51	MLS Cup Knockout Round
5	New England Revolution	34	14	12	8	48	47	+1	50	MLS Cup Knockout Round

Source: MLS

==== Overall Table ====
Pos	Team	Pld	W	L	T	GF	GA	GD	Pts	Qualification
1	New York Red Bulls (S)	34	18	10	6	62	43	+19	60	CONCACAF Champions League
2	FC Dallas	34	18	10	6	52	39	+13	60	CONCACAF Champions League
3	Vancouver Whitecaps FC	34	16	13	5	45	36	+9	53	CONCACAF Champions League
4	Columbus Crew SC	34	15	11	8	58	53	+5	53	
5	Portland Timbers (C)	34	15	11	8	41	39	+2	53	CONCACAF Champions League

Source: MLS
Rules for classification: 1) points; 2) total wins; 3) total goal differential; 4) total goals scored
(C) MLS Cup Champion; (S) Supporters' Shield

=== MLS Cup Playoffs ===
==== Conference semifinals ====
November 1 First leg	D.C. United	0–1	New York Red Bulls	Washington, D.C.
3:00 p.m. EDT		Report	McCarty 72'	Stadium: RFK Stadium; Attendance: 19,525; Referee: Fotis Bazakos

November 8 Second leg	New York Red Bulls	1–0 (2–0 agg.)	D.C. United	Harrison, New Jersey
3:00 p.m. EDT	Wright-Phillips 90'	Report		Stadium: Red Bull Arena; Attendance: 25,219; Referee: Ted Unkel

==== Conference finals ====
November 22 First leg	Columbus Crew	2–0	New York Red Bulls	Columbus, Ohio
5:00 p.m. EDT	Meram 1'; Kamara 85'	Report		Stadium: MAPFRE Stadium; Referee: Allen Chapman

November 29 Second leg	New York Red Bulls	1–0 (1–2 agg.)	Columbus Crew	Harrison, New Jersey
7:30 p.m. EDT	Abang 90'	Report		Stadium: Red Bull Arena; Attendance: 25,219; Referee: Baldomero Toledo

=== U.S. Open Cup ===
New York Red Bulls will enter the 2015 U.S. Open Cup with the rest of Major League Soccer in the fourth round.

June 16, 2015 4th Round	New York Red Bulls (New Jersey) (New York (state))	3–0	(Georgia (U.S. state)) Atlanta Silverbacks	Harrison, New Jersey
7:30 PM EDT	Sam 7'; Zubar 15'; Davis 70'	Report		Stadium: Red Bull Arena; Attendance: 5,585

July 1, 2015 5th Round	New York Red Bulls (New Jersey) (New York (state))	4–1	(New York (state)) New York Cosmos	Harrison, New Jersey
7:30 PM EDT	Zizzo 5'; Abang 42'; Klejstan 54' (pen.); Grella 90'	Report	Mkosana 15'	Stadium: Red Bull Arena; Attendance: 11,442

July 21, 2015 Quarter-finals	New York Red Bulls (New Jersey) (New York (state))	1–1 (a.e.t.) (3–4 p)	(Pennsylvania) Philadelphia Union	Harrison, New Jersey
4:00 PM EDT	Sam 90'	Report	Ayuk 56'	Stadium: Red Bull Arena
	Penalties
	Wright-Phillips (penalty missed); McCarty (penalty scored); Grella (penalty scored); Sam (penalty missed); Kljestan (penalty scored)		(penalty scored) Williams; (penalty scored) Nogueira; (penalty scored) Adu; (penalty missed) Fred; (penalty scored) Aristeguieta

=== International Champions Cup ===
July 22, 2015	New York Red Bulls (United States)	4–2	(England) Chelsea	Harrison, New Jersey
20:00 EDT	Castellanos 51'; Adams 70'; Davis 73', 77'	Report	Rémy 26'; Hazard 75'	Stadium: Red Bull Arena

July 26, 2015	New York Red Bulls (United States)	2–1	(Portugal) S.L. Benfica	Harrison, New Jersey
EDT	Wright-Phillips 34'; Grella 56'		Pizzi 7'	Stadium: Red Bull Arena

== Player statistics ==
As of November 29, 2015

No.	Pos	Nat	Player	Total		MLS		MLS Cup		U.S. Open Cup	
No.	Pos	Nat	Player	Apps	Goals	Apps	Goals	Apps	Goals	Apps	Goals
5	MF	(United States) USA	Connor Lade	21	0	16+2	0	0	0	3	0
6	DF	(United States) USA	Anthony Wallace	8	2	6	2	0	0	1+1	0
7	DF	(Costa Rica) CRC	Roy Miller	7	0	5+1	0	0	0	1	0
8	MF	(Brazil) BRA	Felipe	41	3	34	3	4	0	2+1	0
9	ST	(Cameroon) CMR	Anatole Abang	21	6	3+14	4	0+2	1	2	1
10	MF	(Ghana) GHA	Lloyd Sam	38	12	27+4	10	4	0	3	2
11	MF	(United States) USA	Dax McCarty	39	2	32	1	4	1	3	0
13	ST	(United States) USA	Mike Grella	40	10	30+3	9	4	0	1+2	1
15	MF	(United States) USA	Sal Zizzo	28	1	10+12	0	4	0	1+1	1
16	MF	(United States) USA	Sacha Kljestan	40	9	33	8	4	0	3	1
17	MF	(United States) USA	Manolo Sanchez	4	0	0+3	0	0	0	0+1	0
20	DF	(United States) USA	Matt Miazga	32	1	24+2	1	4	0	2	0
21	MF	(Cameroon) CMR	Marius Obekop	1	0	0+1	0	0	0	0	0
22	DF	(Canada) CAN	Karl Ouimette	11	0	7+4	0	0	0	0	0
23	DF	(France) FRA	Ronald Zubar	17	2	8+4	1	3+1	0	1	1
25	DF	(United States) USA	Chris Duvall	16	1	14+1	1	0	0	1	0
27	MF	(United States) USA	Sean Davis	16	1	4+10	0	0	0	1+1	1
30	MF	(Argentina) ARG	Gonzalo Verón	17	1	2+11	1	0+4	0	0	0
31	GK	(United States) USA	Luis Robles	41	0	34	0	4	0	3	0
55	DF	(France) FRA	Damien Perrinelle	32	2	27+1	2	1	0	3	0
92	DF	(Jamaica) JAM	Kemar Lawrence	27	1	23	1	4	0	0	0
98	MF	(England) ENG	Shaun Wright-Phillips	14	1	1+11	1	0+2	0	0	0
99	ST	(England) ENG	Bradley Wright-Phillips	39	18	32+1	17	4	1	2	0
Players who left the club during the season
35	DF	(Haiti) HAI	Andrew Jean-Baptiste	1	0	0	0	0	0	0+1	0
Out on Loan
91	MF	(Jamaica) JAM	Dane Richards	13	0	1+11	0	0	0	0+1	0

=== Top scorers ===
Place	Position	Number	Name	MLS	MLS Cup	U.S. Open Cup	Total
1	FW	99	(England) Bradley Wright-Phillips	17	1	0	18
2	MF	10	(Ghana) Lloyd Sam	10	0	2	12
3	FW	13	(United States) Mike Grella	9	0	1	10
4	MF	16	(United States) Sacha Kljestan	8	0	1	9
5	FW	9	(Cameroon) Anatole Abang	4	1	1	6
6	MF	8	(Brazil) Felipe	3	0	0	3
7	DF	6	(United States) Anthony Wallace	2	0	0	2
7	MF	11	(United States) Dax McCarty	1	1	0	2
7	DF	23	(France) Ronald Zubar	1	0	1	2
7	DF	55	(France) Damien Perrinelle	2	0	0	2
8	MF	15	(United States) Sal Zizzo	0	0	1	1
8	DF	20	(United States) Matt Miazga	1	0	0	1
8	DF	25	(United States) Chris Duvall	1	0	0	1
8	MF	27	(United States) Sean Davis	0	0	1	1
8	MF	30	(Argentina) Gonzalo Verón	1	0	0	1
8	DF	92	(Jamaica) Kemar Lawrence	1	0	0	1
8	MF	98	(England) Shaun Wright-Phillips	1	0	0	1
Total				62	3	8	73

As of November 29, 2015.

=== Assist Leaders ===
Place	Position	Number	Name	MLS	MLS Cup	U.S. Open Cup	Total
1	MF	16	(United States) Sacha Kljestan	10	1	1	12
2	FW	13	(United States) Mike Grella	6	0	2	8
3	MF	11	(United States) Dax McCarty	7	0	0	7
3	FW	99	(England) Bradley Wright-Phillips	6	0	1	7
4	MF	10	(Ghana) Lloyd Sam	4	1	1	6
5	MF	8	(Brazil) Felipe	3	0	1	4
6	MF	30	(Argentina) Gonzalo Verón	1	1	0	2
6	DF	92	(Jamaica) Kemar Lawrence	2	0	0	2
7	DF	5	(United States) Connor Lade	1	0	0	1
7	FW	9	(Cameroon) Anatole Abang	1	0	0	1
7	MF	15	(United States) Sal Zizzo	1	0	0	1
7	DF	20	(United States) Matt Miazga	1	0	0	1
7	MF	21	(Cameroon) Marius Obekop	1	0	0	1
7	DF	25	(United States) Chris Duvall	1	0	0	1
7	MF	27	(United States) Sean Davis	1	0	0	1
7	DF	55	(France) Damien Perrinelle	1	0	0	1
7	MF	98	(England) Shaun Wright-Phillips	1	0	0	1
Total				47	3	6	55

As of November 29, 2015.
This table does not include secondary assists.

=== Clean Sheets ===
Place	Position	Number	Name	MLS	MLS Cup	U.S. Open Cup	Total
1	GK	31	(United States) Luis Robles	9	3	1	13
Total				9	3	1	13

As of November 29, 2015.

== See also ==
- 2015 in American soccer
