= 2016 New York Red Bulls season =

New York Red Bulls
2016 season
- Sporting director: Ali Curtis
- Head coach: Jesse Marsch
- MLS: Conference: 1st Overall: 3rd
- MLS Cup playoffs: Conference semi-finals
- U.S. Open Cup: Fifth round
- CONCACAF Champions League: Quarter-finals
- Top goalscorer: League: Bradley Wright-Phillips (24 goals); All: Bradley Wright-Phillips (25 goals)
- Highest home attendance: 25,218 (July 24 vs. New York City FC)
- Lowest home attendance: 15,167 (March 19 vs. Houston Dynamo)
- Average home league attendance: 20,620
Home colors	Away colors

The 2016 New York Red Bulls season was the club's twenty first season in Major League Soccer, the top division of soccer in the United States.

== Team information ==
=== Squad information ===
As of November 6, 2016

Appearances and goals are career totals from all-competitions.

Squad No.	Name	Nationality	Position(s)	Date of birth (age)	Signed from	Games played	Goals scored
Goalkeepers
18	Ryan Meara	(United States)	GK	November 15, 1990 (aged 25)	(United States) Fordham University	29	0
24	Kyle Reynish	(United States)	GK	November 3, 1983 (aged 32)	(United States) Chicago Fire	0	0
31	Luis Robles	(United States)	GK	May 11, 1984 (aged 31)	(Germany) Karlsruher SC	162	0
Defenders
3	Gideon Baah	(Ghana)	CB/LB	October 11, 1991 (aged 24)	(Finland) HJK Helsinki	10	2
5	Connor Lade	(United States)	RB	November 16, 1989 (aged 26)	Academy	87	4
15	Sal Zizzo	(United States)	RB	April 3, 1987 (aged 28)	(United States) Sporting Kansas City	63	1
20	Justin Bilyeu	(United States)	LB	February 3, 1994 (aged 22)	(United States) Southern Illinois University	8	0
23	Ronald Zubar	(Guadeloupe)	CB	September 20, 1985 (aged 30)	(France) AC Ajaccio	40	4
25	Chris Duvall	(United States)	RB/CB	September 10, 1991 (aged 24)	(United States) Wake Forest University	67	1
33	Aaron Long	(United States)	CB	October 12, 1992 (aged 23)	(United States) New York Red Bulls II (on loan)	3	0
55	Damien Perrinelle	(France)	CB	September 12, 1983 (aged 32)	(France) FC Istres	51	2
78	Aurélien Collin	(France)	CB	March 8, 1986 (aged 29)	(United States) Orlando City SC	31	0
92	Kemar Lawrence	(Jamaica)	LB	September 17, 1992 (aged 23)	(Jamaica) Harbour View	53	1
Midfielders
4	Tyler Adams	(United States)	CM	February 14, 1999 (aged 17)	Academy	4	0
7	Derrick Etienne	(Haiti)	CM	November 25, 1996 (aged 19)	Academy	3	0
8	Felipe	(Brazil)	CM	September 30, 1990 (aged 25)	(Canada) Montreal Impact	81	8
11	Dax McCarty (captain)	(United States)	CM	April 30, 1987 (aged 28)	(United States) D.C. United	198	15
13	Mike Grella	(United States)	LW	January 23, 1987 (aged 29)	(United States) Carolina RailHawks	78	18
16	Sacha Kljestan	(United States)	CM	September 9, 1985 (aged 30)	(Belgium) Anderlecht	79	18
19	Alex Muyl	(United States)	RW/LW	September 30, 1995 (aged 20)	Academy	33	3
27	Sean Davis	(United States)	CM	February 8, 1993 (aged 23)	Academy	43	3
30	Gonzalo Verón	(Argentina)	RW/CM	December 24, 1989 (aged 26)	(Argentina) San Lorenzo	48	4
77	Daniel Royer	(Austria)	RW/LW	May 22, 1990 (aged 25)	(Denmark) FC Midtjylland	7	1
98	Shaun Wright-Phillips	(England)	RW/LW	October 25, 1981 (aged 34)	(England) Queens Park Rangers	25	1
Forwards
21	Brandon Allen	(United States)	FW	October 8, 1993 (aged 22)	Academy	1	0
26	Omer Damari	(Israel)	FW	March 24, 1989 (aged 26)	(Germany) RB Leipzig (on loan)	6	1
99	Bradley Wright-Phillips	(England)	FW	March 12, 1985 (aged 30)	(England) Charlton Athletic	126	76

== Roster transactions ==
=== In ===
#	Position	Player	Signed from	Details	Date	Source
18	GK	(United States) Ryan Meara	(United States) New York City FC	Returned from Loan	October 28, 2015	
4	MF	(United States) Tyler Adams	(United States) New York Red Bulls II	Homegrown player	November 3, 2015	
7	MF	(Haiti) Derrick Etienne	Academy	Homegrown player	December 21, 2015	
21	FW	(United States) Brandon Allen	Academy	Homegrown player	December 21, 2015	
19	FW	(United States) Alex Muyl	Academy	Homegrown player	December 22, 2015	
6	MF	(United States) Mael Corboz	Academy	Homegrown player	December 23, 2015	
2	DF	(United States) Scott Thomsen	Academy	Homegrown player	December 23, 2015	
17	MF	(United States) Chris Thorsheim	Academy	Homegrown player	December 23, 2015	
55	DF	(France) Damien Perrinelle	Free Agent	Re-signed with club	January 8, 2016	
98	MF	(England) Shaun Wright-Phillips	Free Agent	Re-signed with club	January 25, 2016	
24	GK	(United States) Kyle Reynish	Free Agent	Re-signed with club	January 29, 2016	
3	DF	(Ghana) Gideon Baah	(Finland) HJK Helsinki	Undisclosed	February 9, 2016	
20	DF	(United States) Justin Bilyeu	(United States) Southern Illinois University	Draft Pick	March 3, 2016	
17	DF	(United States) Zach Carroll	(United States) Michigan State University	Draft Pick	March 3, 2016	
78	DF	(France) Aurélien Collin	(United States) Orlando City SC	Exchange for 2017 MLS Super Draft Fourth Round Pick	April 29, 2016	
77	MF	(Austria) Daniel Royer	(Denmark) FC Midtjylland	Undisclosed	August 3, 2016	
26	FW	(Israel) Omer Damari	(Germany) RB Leipzig	Loan until December 2016	August 4, 2016	
33	DF	(United States) Aaron Long	(United States) New York Red Bulls II	Loan until December 2016	September 16, 2016	

=== Out ===
#	Position	Player	Signed by	Details	Date	Source
7	DF	(Costa Rica) Roy Miller	(Costa Rica) Saprissa	Option Declined	December 2, 2015	
55	DF	(France) Damien Perrinelle	Free Agent (Note: Following Perrinelle's release he was re-signed on January 8, 2016)	Option Declined	December 2, 2015	
98	MF	(England) Shaun Wright-Phillips	Free Agent (Note: Following Wright-Phillips' release he was re-signed on January 25, 2016)	Option Declined	December 2, 2015	
18	GK	(United States) Kyle Reynish	Free Agent (Note: Following Reynish's release he was re-signed on January 29, 2016)	Option Declined	December 2, 2015	
6	DF	(United States) Anthony Wallace	(United States) Jacksonville Armada	Option Declined	December 2, 2015	
19	MF	(Germany) Leo Stolz	Free Agent (Note: Later retired from professional soccer.)	Option Declined	December 2, 2015	
17	MF	(Puerto Rico) Manolo Sanchez	(United States) San Antonio FC	Option Declined	December 2, 2015	
21	MF	(Cameroon) Marius Obekop	(United States) Orlando City B	Option Declined	December 2, 2015	
91	MF	(Jamaica) Dane Richards	(United States) Miami FC	Option Declined	December 2, 2015	
24	GK	(United States) Santiago Castaño	(Colombia) Socrates Valencia F.C.	Released	January 25, 2016	
20	DF	(United States) Matt Miazga	(England) Chelsea	$5,000,000 Transfer	January 30, 2016	
3	DF	(United States) Shawn McLaws	(United States) Harrisburg City Islanders	Waived	February 12, 2016	
6	MF	(United States) Mael Corboz	(United States) Wilmington Hammerheads FC	Waived	February 29, 2016	
2	DF	(United States) Scott Thomsen	(United States) Richmond Kickers	Waived	March 7, 2016	
17	MF	(United States) Chris Thorsheim	(Denmark) Middelfart G&BK	Waived	March 15, 2016	
17	DF	(United States) Zach Carroll	(United States) New York Red Bulls II	Waived	May 5, 2016	
22	DF	(Canada) Karl Ouimette	(United States) Jacksonville Armada	Loan until December 2016	June 24, 2016	
10	MF	(Ghana) Lloyd Sam	(United States) D.C. United	$150,000 General Allocation Money	July 7, 2016	
9	FW	(Cameroon) Anatole Abang	(Denmark) Hobro IK	Loan until June 2017	August 22, 2016	

=== Draft picks ===
Round	#	Position	Player	College/Club Team	Reference
1 (18)	20	DF	(United States) Justin Bilyeu	Southern Illinois University	
2 (18)	17	DF	(United States) Zach Carroll	Michigan State University	

== Preseason and Friendlies ==
=== Scrimmages ===
January 28	South Florida Bulls	1–3	New York Red Bulls	Orlando, Florida
10:30AM EST	N/A (pen.)	Report	B. Wright-Phillips; Sanchez; Allen
Note: Three 30-minute periods

January 31	Montverde Academy	1–0	New York Red Bulls	Orlando, Florida
12:30PM EST	N/A 13'	Report
Note: Reserve/ Red Bulls II Squad

February 20	Central Florida Knights	2–5	New York Red Bulls	Orlando, Florida
10:30AM EST	Basic 25' (pen.); Pyysalo 54' (pen.)	Report	B. Wright-Phillips 12'; Zubar 29'; Kljestan 34'; Abang 74', 90'

February 20	New York Red Bulls	1–1	Toronto FC	Orlando, Florida
12:30PM EST	Hagglund 55' (o.g.)	Report	Babouli 65'
Note: Two 35 minutes halves. Red Bulls II Squad.

=== Friendlies ===
January 31	Jacksonville Armada	2–5	New York Red Bulls	Orlando, Florida
10:30AM EST	Keita 12'; Barrow 50'	Report	B. Wright-Phillips 27' (pen.); Kljestan 45'; Grella 57'; Bonomo 67'; Lade 85'

February 4	New York Red Bulls	5–0	Montreal Impact	Orlando, Florida
10:30AM EST	B. Wright-Phillips 31', 34'; Bezecourt 51'; Kljestan 54'; Allen 117'	Report
Note: Three 45-minute periods.

February 17	Orlando City SC	3–2	New York Red Bulls	Orlando, Florida
10:30AM EST	Kaká 23'; Winter 62'; Ribeiro 85'	Report	B. Wright-Phillips 25'; Lawrence 36'

February 24	New York Red Bulls	0–0	Philadelphia Union	Clearwater, Florida
7:00PM EST		Report		Stadium: Joe DiMaggio Sports Complex

February 27	Jacksonville Armada	1–5	New York Red Bulls	Jacksonville, Florida
6:45PM EST	Eloundou 86'	Report	Verón 24', 60', 61'; Baah 28'; Davis 84'	Stadium: Community First Park

July 6	New York Red Bulls	2–0	Club América	Harrison, New Jersey
8:00PM EST	S. Wright-Phillips 2'; Metzger 53'	Report		Stadium: Red Bull Arena; Attendance: 20,217

=== Statistics ===
6 Goals

- (England) Bradley Wright-Phillips

3 Goals

- (United States) Sacha Kljestan
- (Argentina) Gonzalo Verón

2 Goals

- (Cameroon) Anatole Abang
- (United States) Brandon Allen

1 Goal

- (Ghana) Gideon Baah
- (United States) Sean Davis
- (Jamaica) Kemar Lawrence
- (England) Shaun Wright-Phillips
- (France) Vincent Bezecourt
- (United States) Mike Grella
- (United States) Dan Metzger
- (Guadeloupe) Ronald Zubar
- (United States) Stefano Bonomo
- (United States) Connor Lade
- (Puerto Rico) Manolo Sanchez

== Major League Soccer season ==
=== Eastern Conference ===
Pos	Team	Pld	W	L	T	GF	GA	GD	Pts	Qualification
1	New York Red Bulls	34	16	9	9	61	44	+17	57	MLS Cup Conference Semifinals
2	New York City FC	34	15	10	9	62	57	+5	54	MLS Cup Conference Semifinals
3	Toronto FC	34	14	9	11	51	39	+12	53	MLS Cup Knockout Round
4	D.C. United	34	11	10	13	53	47	+6	46	MLS Cup Knockout Round
5	Montreal Impact	34	11	11	12	49	53	−4	45	MLS Cup Knockout Round
6	Philadelphia Union	34	11	14	9	52	55	−3	42	MLS Cup Knockout Round
7	New England Revolution	34	11	14	9	44	54	−10	42	
8	Orlando City SC	34	9	11	14	55	60	−5	41	
9	Columbus Crew SC	34	8	14	12	50	58	−8	36	
10	Chicago Fire	34	7	17	10	42	58	−16	31	

Source: MLS

=== Overall ===
Pos	Team	Pld	W	L	T	GF	GA	GD	Pts	Qualification
1	FC Dallas (S)	34	17	8	9	50	40	+10	60	CONCACAF Champions League
2	Colorado Rapids	34	15	6	13	39	32	+7	58	CONCACAF Champions League
3	New York Red Bulls	34	16	9	9	61	44	+17	57	CONCACAF Champions League
4	New York City FC	34	15	10	9	62	57	+5	54	
5	Toronto FC	34	14	9	11	51	39	+12	53	CONCACAF Champions League
6	LA Galaxy	34	12	6	16	54	39	+15	52	
7	Seattle Sounders FC (C)	34	14	14	6	44	43	+1	48	CONCACAF Champions League
8	Sporting Kansas City	34	13	13	8	42	41	+1	47	
9	Real Salt Lake	34	12	12	10	44	46	−2	46	
10	D.C. United	34	11	10	13	53	47	+6	46	
11	Montreal Impact	34	11	11	12	49	53	−4	45	
12	Portland Timbers	34	12	14	8	48	53	−5	44	
13	Philadelphia Union	34	11	14	9	52	55	−3	42	
14	New England Revolution	34	11	14	9	44	54	−10	42	
15	Orlando City SC	34	9	11	14	55	60	−5	41	
16	Vancouver Whitecaps FC	34	10	15	9	45	52	−7	39	
17	San Jose Earthquakes	34	8	12	14	32	40	−8	38	
18	Columbus Crew SC	34	8	14	12	50	58	−8	36	
19	Houston Dynamo	34	7	14	13	39	45	−6	34	
20	Chicago Fire	34	7	17	10	42	58	−16	31	

Source: MLS
Rules for classification: 1) points; 2) total wins; 3) total goal differential; 4) total goals scored;
(C) MLS Cup Champion; (S) Supporters' Shield

=== Results summary ===
Overall								Home						Away					
Pld	W	D	L	GF	GA	GD	Pts	W	D	L	GF	GA	GD	W	D	L	GF	GA	GD
34	16	9	9	61	44	+17	57	13	2	2	36	17	+19	3	7	7	25	27	−2

Last updated: October 23, 2016.
Source: MLS

=== Matches ===
March 6 1	New York Red Bulls	0–2	Toronto FC	Harrison, New Jersey
1:30 PM EST		Report	Giovinco 82' (pen.); Delgado 90+1'	Stadium: Red Bull Arena; Attendance: 21,303; Referee: Allen Chapman

March 12 2	Montreal Impact	3–0	New York Red Bulls	Montreal, Quebec
4:00 PM EST	Oduro 58'; Piatti 71'; Jackson-Hemel 90+4'	Report		Stadium: Stade Saputo; Attendance: 27,545; Referee: Drew Fischer

March 19 3	New York Red Bulls	4–3	Houston Dynamo	Harrison, New Jersey
7:00 PM EDT	Kljestan 22'; Grella 63'; Felipe 77', 83'	Report	Bruin 35', 41'; Alex 65'	Stadium: Red Bull Arena; Attendance: 15,167; Referee: Jair Marrufo

April 1 4	New England Revolution	1–0	New York Red Bulls	Foxborough, Massachusetts
7:00 PM EDT	Fagúndez 55'	Report	Felipe (red card) 61'	Stadium: Gillette Stadium; Attendance: 11,849; Referee: Mark Geiger

April 9 5	New York Red Bulls	0–2	Sporting Kansas City	Harrison, New Jersey
7:00 PM EDT		Report	Feilhaber 17'; Dwyer 60'	Stadium: Red Bull Arena; Attendance: 21,406; Referee: Fotis Bazakos

April 13 6	San Jose Earthquakes	2–0	New York Red Bulls	San Jose, California
10:30 PM EDT	Alashe 40'; Wondolowski 55'	Report		Stadium: Avaya Stadium; Attendance: 18,000; Referee: Dave Gantar

April 16 7	Colorado Rapids	2–1	New York Red Bulls	Commerce City, Colorado
9:00 PM EDT	Jones 21'; Badji 82'	Report	Zubar 60'	Stadium: Dick's Sporting Goods Park; Attendance: 10,670; Referee: Ricardo Salazar

April 24 8	New York Red Bulls	3–2	Orlando City SC	Harrison, New Jersey
7:30 PM EDT	Grella 65'; B. Wright-Phillips 69', 75'	Report	Larin 3'; Ouimette 84' (o.g.)	Stadium: Red Bull Arena; Attendance: 18,238; Referee: Hilario Grajeda

April 29 9	New York Red Bulls	4–0	FC Dallas	Harrison, New Jersey
7:00 PM EDT	Sam 37'; Kljestan 52'; Grella 71'; Felipe 83'	Report		Stadium: Red Bull Arena; Attendance: 18,025; Referee: Jair Marrufo

May 6 10	Orlando City SC	1–1	New York Red Bulls	Orlando, Florida
7:00 PM EDT	Molino 67'; Higuita (red card) 85'	Report	B. Wright-Phillips 19'	Stadium: Citrus Bowl; Attendance: 31,264; Referee: Ted Unkel

May 13 11 – Atlantic Cup	D.C. United	2–0	New York Red Bulls	Washington, D.C.
7:00 PM EDT	Saborio 20'; Nyarko 43'	Report		Stadium: Robert F. Kennedy Memorial Stadium; Attendance: 19,632; Referee: Silviu Petrescu

May 18 12	New York Red Bulls	1–0	Chicago Fire	Harrison, New Jersey
7:30 PM EDT	Grella 58'	Report		Stadium: Red Bull Arena; Attendance: 16,624; Referee: Robert Sibiga

May 21 13 – Hudson River Derby	New York City FC	0–7	New York Red Bulls	New York, New York
3:00 PM EDT		Report	McCarty 3', 51'; B. Wright-Phillips 42', 45+2'; Muyl 56'; Verón 83'; Baah 89'	Stadium: Yankee Stadium; Attendance: 37,858; Referee: Chris Penso

May 28 14	New York Red Bulls	3–0	Toronto FC	Harrison, New Jersey
7:00 PM EDT	B. Wright-Phillips 4', 25', 27'; Verón (red card) 43'	Report		Stadium: Red Bull Arena; Attendance: 20,324; Referee: Allen Chapman

June 19 15	New York Red Bulls	2–0	Seattle Sounders FC	Harrison, New Jersey
7:30 PM EDT	Grella 18', 59'	Report		Stadium: Red Bull Arena; Attendance: 21,102; Referee: Chris Penso

June 22 16	Real Salt Lake	2–1	New York Red Bulls	Sandy, Utah
10:00 PM EDT	Movsisyan 65'; Allen 87'	Report	Baah 7'; Collin (red card) 43'	Stadium: Rio Tinto Stadium; Attendance: 18,036; Referee: Fotis Bazakos

June 25 17	Columbus Crew	1–1	New York Red Bulls	Columbus, Ohio
7:30 PM EDT	Kamara 90+3'	Report	B. Wright-Phillips 52'	Stadium: Mapfre Stadium; Attendance: 20,389; Referee: Baldomero Toledo

July 3 18 – Hudson River Derby	New York City FC	2–0	New York Red Bulls	New York, New York
12:00 PM EDT	Harrison 8'; Villa 66'	Report		Stadium: Yankee Stadium; Attendance: 33,613; Referee: Hilario Grajeda

July 10 19	New York Red Bulls	0–0	Portland Timbers	Harrison, New Jersey
6:00 PM EDT		Report		Stadium: Red Bull Arena; Attendance: 19,985; Referee: Kevin Stott

July 13 20	New York Red Bulls	2–0	Orlando City SC	Harrison, New Jersey
7:30 PM EDT	Lade 37'; Felipe 59'	Report		Stadium: Red Bull Arena; Attendance: 19,121; Referee: Sorin Stoica

July 17 21	Philadelphia Union	2–2	New York Red Bulls	Chester, Pennsylvania
7:00 PM EDT	Sapong 67' (pen.); Pontius 68'	Report	Kljestan 27', 44'	Stadium: Talen Energy Stadium; Attendance: 18,500; Referee: Alan Kelly

July 24 22 – Hudson River Derby	New York Red Bulls	4–1	New York City FC	Harrison, New Jersey
1:00 PM EDT	B. Wright-Phillips 20', 70'; Zubar 23'; Kljestan 41' (pen.)	Report	McNamara 43'	Stadium: Red Bull Arena; Attendance: 25,218; Referee: Mark Geiger

July 31 23	Chicago Fire	2–2	New York Red Bulls	Bridgeview, Illinois
7:00 PM EDT	Accam 35'; Polster 45+2'	Report	Polster 16' (o.g.); B. Wright-Phillips 90'	Stadium: Toyota Park

August 7 24	LA Galaxy	2–2	New York Red Bulls	Carson, California
9:30 PM EDT	Magee 80'; Cole 89'	Report	Verón 68'; Davis 74'	Stadium: StubHub Center; Attendance: 25,671; Referee: Hilario Grajeda

August 13 25	New York Red Bulls	3–1	Montreal Impact	Harrison, New Jersey
7:00 PM EDT	B. Wright-Phillips 22', 41'; Davis 46'	Report	Piatti 21'; Oyongo (red card) 48'	Stadium: Red Bull Arena; Attendance: 23,459; Referee: Chris Penso

August 21 26 – Atlantic Cup	D.C. United	2–2	New York Red Bulls	Washington, D.C.
3:00 PM EDT	Sarvas 70' (pen.); Mullins 73'	Report	B. Wright-Phillips 38'; Felipe 64'	Stadium: Robert F. Kennedy Memorial Stadium; Attendance: 15,139; Referee: Ismail Elfath

August 28 27	New York Red Bulls	1–0	New England Revolution	Harrison, New Jersey
2:30 PM EDT	B. Wright-Phillips 55'	Report		Stadium: Red Bull Arena; Attendance: 22,600; Referee: Ricardo Salazar

September 3 28	Vancouver Whitecaps FC	0–1	New York Red Bulls	Vancouver, British Columbia
7:00 PM EDT		Report	B. Wright-Phillips 50'	Stadium: BC Place; Attendance: 22,120; Referee: Sorin Stoica

September 11 29 – Atlantic Cup	New York Red Bulls	2–2	D.C. United	Harrison, New Jersey
1:00 PM EDT	Verón 35'; B. Wright-Phillips 54'	Report	Birnbaum 89'; Neagle 90+5'	Stadium: Red Bull Arena; Attendance: 20,086; Referee: Jair Marrufo

September 18 30	Toronto FC	3–3	New York Red Bulls	Toronto
7:00 PM EDT	Bradley 41'; Altidore 68', 86'	Report	Beitashour 12' (o.g.); B. Wright-Phillips 31', 48'	Stadium: BMO Field; Attendance: 24,078; Referee: Robert Sibiga

September 24 31	New York Red Bulls	1–0	Montreal Impact	Harrison, New Jersey
7:00 PM EDT	Royer 60'	Report		Stadium: Red Bull Arena; Attendance: 22,209; Referee: Jorge González

October 1 32	New York Red Bulls	3–2	Philadelphia Union	Harrison, New Jersey
7:00 PM EDT	Kljestan 44'; B. Wright-Phillips 47'; McCarty 66'	Report	Herbers 15'; Pontius 55'	Stadium: Red Bull Arena; Attendance: 22,731; Referee: José Carlos Rivero

October 16 33	New York Red Bulls	3–2	Columbus Crew	Harrison, New Jersey
5:00 PM EDT	Grella 53'; B. Wright-Phillips 58', 70'	Report	Jahn 73'; Afful 83'	Stadium: Red Bull Arena; Attendance: 22,937; Referee: Edvin Jurisevic

October 23 34	Philadelphia Union	0–2	New York Red Bulls	Chester, Pennsylvania
4:00 PM EDT			B. Wright-Phillips 26'; Muyl 57'	Stadium: Talen Energy Stadium; Attendance: 18,500; Referee: Kevin Stott

== MLS Cup Playoffs ==
=== Conference semifinals ===
October 30 First leg	Montreal Impact	1–0	New York Red Bulls	Montreal, Quebec
3:00 PM EDT	Mancosu 61'	Report	Damari (red card) 90+3'	Stadium: Saputo Stadium; Attendance: 15,027; Referee: Robert Sibiga

November 6 Second leg	New York Red Bulls	1–2 (1–3 agg.)	Montreal Impact	Harrison, New Jersey
4:00 PM EST	B. Wright-Phillips 77'	Report	Piatti 51', 85'	Stadium: Red Bull Arena; Attendance: 24,314; Referee: Baldomero Toledo

== U.S. Open Cup ==
New York Red Bulls entered the 2016 U.S. Open Cup with the rest of Major League Soccer in the fourth round.

June 15 Fourth Round	Rochester Rhinos	0–1	New York Red Bulls	Rochester, New York
7:05 PM EDT		Report	Kljestan 20' (pen.)	Stadium: Rochester Rhinos Stadium; Attendance: 3,596; Referee: Charles Murphy

June 29 Fifth Round	Philadelphia Union	2–1	New York Red Bulls	Chester, Pennsylvania
7:00 PM EDT	Pontius 55', 60'	Report	Grella 17'	Stadium: Talen Energy Stadium; Referee: Mark Kadlecik

== CONCACAF Champions League ==
=== Group stage ===
Pos	Team	Pld	W	D	L	GF	GA	GD	Pts	Qualification	NYR	ALI	ANT
1	(United States) New York Red Bulls	4	2	2	0	5	1	+4	8	Quarter-finals	—	1–0	3–0
2	(El Salvador) Alianza	4	1	2	1	5	4	+1	5		1–1	—	1–1
3	(Guatemala) Antigua	4	0	2	2	2	7	−5	2		0–0	1–3	—

Source: CONCACAF

August 3 1	New York Red Bulls (United States)	3–0	(Guatemala) Antigua	Harrison, New Jersey
8:00 PM EDT	Pinto 14' (o.g.); Muyl 62'; Kljestan 79'	Report	Betancourt (red card) 26'	Stadium: Red Bull Arena; Attendance: 4,958

August 16 2	Alianza (El Salvador)	1–1	(United States) New York Red Bulls	San Salvador, El Salvador
10:00 PM EDT	Larín 54'	Report	Damari 71'	Stadium: Estadio Cuscatlán

September 15 3	New York Red Bulls (United States)	1–0	(El Salvador) Alianza	Harrison, New Jersey
8:00 PM EDT	Kljestan 90'	Report		Stadium: Red Bull Arena; Attendance: 4,797

September 27 4	Antigua (Guatemala)	0–0	(United States) New York Red Bulls	Antigua, Guatemala
8:00 PM EDT		Report		Stadium: Estadio Pensativo

== Player statistics ==
As of November 6, 2016

No.	Pos	Nat	Player	Total		MLS		MLS Cup		U.S. Open Cup		Champions League	
No.	Pos	Nat	Player	Apps	Goals	Apps	Goals	Apps	Goals	Apps	Goals	Apps	Goals
Goalkeepers
18	GK	(United States) USA	Ryan Meara	2	-2	0	0	0	0	1	-2	1	0
24	GK	(United States) USA	Kyle Reynish	0	0	0	0	0	0	0	0	0	0
31	GK	(United States) USA	Luis Robles	40	-48	34	-44	2	-3	1	0	3	-1
Defenders
3	DF	(Ghana) GHA	Gideon Baah	10	2	6+3	2	0	0	1	0	0	0
5	DF	(United States) USA	Connor Lade	20	1	15+3	1	0	0	1	0	0+1	0
15	DF	(United States) USA	Sal Zizzo	35	0	20+8	0	1+1	0	2	0	3	0
20	DF	(United States) USA	Justin Bilyeu	8	0	1+2	0	0	0	1+1	0	3	0
23	DF	(Guadeloupe) GLP	Ronald Zubar	23	2	19+2	2	0	0	1+1	0	0	0
25	DF	(United States) USA	Chris Duvall	29	0	20+5	0	2	0	0	0	1+1	0
33	DF	(United States) USA	Aaron Long	3	0	0	0	0	0	0	0	3	0
55	DF	(France) FRA	Damien Perrinelle	13	0	7+3	0	2	0	0	0	1	0
78	DF	(France) FRA	Aurélien Collin	31	0	21+2	0	2	0	2	0	4	0
92	DF	(Jamaica) JAM	Kemar Lawrence	26	0	21	0	1	0	0	0	1+3	0
Midfielders
4	MF	(United States) USA	Tyler Adams	4	0	1	0	0	0	0	0	3	0
7	MF	(Haiti) HAI	Derrick Etienne	3	0	0+1	0	0	0	0	0	1+1	0
8	MF	(Brazil) BRA	Felipe	40	5	33	5	2	0	0+1	0	4	0
11	MF	(United States) USA	Dax McCarty	31	3	26+1	3	2	0	2	0	0	0
13	MF	(United States) USA	Mike Grella	38	8	28+4	7	2	0	1+1	1	2	0
16	MF	(United States) USA	Sacha Kljestan	39	9	30+2	6	2	0	2	1	0+3	2
19	MF	(United States) USA	Alex Muyl	33	3	18+9	2	2	0	0+1	0	2+1	1
27	MF	(United States) USA	Sean Davis	27	2	11+10	2	0	0	2	0	4	0
30	MF	(Argentina) ARG	Gonzalo Verón	31	3	6+17	3	1+1	0	1+1	0	4	0
77	MF	(Austria) AUT	Daniel Royer	7	1	3+3	1	0+1	0	0	0	0	0
98	MF	(England) ENG	Shaun Wright-Phillips	11	0	1+6	0	0	0	1	0	3	0
Forwards
21	FW	(United States) USA	Brandon Allen	1	0	0+1	0	0	0	0	0	0	0
26	FW	(Israel) ISR	Omer Damari	6	1	0+4	0	0+1	0	0	0	0+1	1
99	FW	(England) ENG	Bradley Wright-Phillips	40	25	32+2	24	2	1	2	0	1+1	0
Transferred During Season
10	MF	(Ghana) GHA	Lloyd Sam	17	1	13+3	1	0	0	1	0	0	0
Loaned During Season
9	FW	(Cameroon) CMR	Anatole Abang	8	0	2+6	0	0	0	0	0	0	0
22	DF	(Canada) CAN	Karl Ouimette	7	0	6+1	0	0	0	0	0	0	0

=== Top scorers ===
Place	Position	Number	Name	MLS	MLS Cup	U.S. Open Cup	Champions League	Total
1	FW	99	(England) Bradley Wright-Phillips	24	1	0	0	25
2	MF	16	(United States) Sacha Kljestan	6	0	1	2	9
3	MF	13	(United States) Mike Grella	7	0	1	0	8
4	MF	8	(Brazil) Felipe	5	0	0	0	5
5	MF	11	(United States) Dax McCarty	3	0	0	0	3
5	MF	19	(United States) Alex Muyl	2	0	0	1	3
5	MF	30	(Argentina) Gonzalo Verón	3	0	0	0	3
6	DF	3	(Ghana) Gideon Baah	2	0	0	0	2
6	DF	23	(Guadeloupe) Ronald Zubar	2	0	0	0	2
6	MF	27	(United States) Sean Davis	2	0	0	0	2
7	DF	5	(United States) Connor Lade	1	0	0	0	1
7	MF	10	(Ghana) Lloyd Sam	1	0	0	0	1
7	FW	26	(Israel) Omer Damari	0	0	0	1	1
7	MF	77	(Austria) Daniel Royer	1	0	0	0	1
Total				59	1	2	4	66

As of November 6, 2016.

=== Assist Leaders ===
Place	Position	Number	Name	MLS	MLS Cup	U.S. Open Cup	Champions League	Total
1	MF	16	(United States) Sacha Kljestan	16	0	0	0	16
2	MF	13	(United States) Mike Grella	5	0	0	0	5
3	MF	8	(Brazil) Felipe	4	0	0	0	4
3	FW	99	(England) Bradley Wright-Phillips	4	0	0	0	4
4	MF	19	(United States) Alex Muyl	3	0	0	0	3
5	MF	10	(Ghana) Lloyd Sam	2	0	0	0	2
5	MF	27	(United States) Sean Davis	2	0	0	0	2
5	MF	30	(Argentina) Gonzalo Verón	0	0	0	2	2
5	MF	77	(Austria) Daniel Royer	1	1	0	0	2
5	DF	78	(France) Aurélien Collin	2	0	0	0	2
5	DF	5	(United States) Connor Lade	1	0	0	0	1
5	MF	11	(United States) Dax McCarty	1	0	0	0	1
5	MF	15	(United States) Sal Zizzo	1	0	0	0	1
5	DF	20	(United States) Justin Bilyeu	0	0	0	1	1
5	DF	25	(United States) Chris Duvall	1	0	0	0	1
5	DF	92	(Jamaica) Kemar Lawrence	0	0	0	1	1
Total				41	1	0	4	46

As of November 6, 2016.
This table does not include secondary assists.

=== Clean sheets ===
Place	Position	Number	Name	MLS	MLS Cup	U.S. Open Cup	Champions League	Total
1	GK	31	(United States) Luis Robles	11	0	1	2	14
2	GK	18	(United States) Ryan Meara	0	0	0	1	1
Total				11	0	1	3	15

As of November 6, 2016.
