= Chris Tsonis =

American professional soccer player (born 1991)

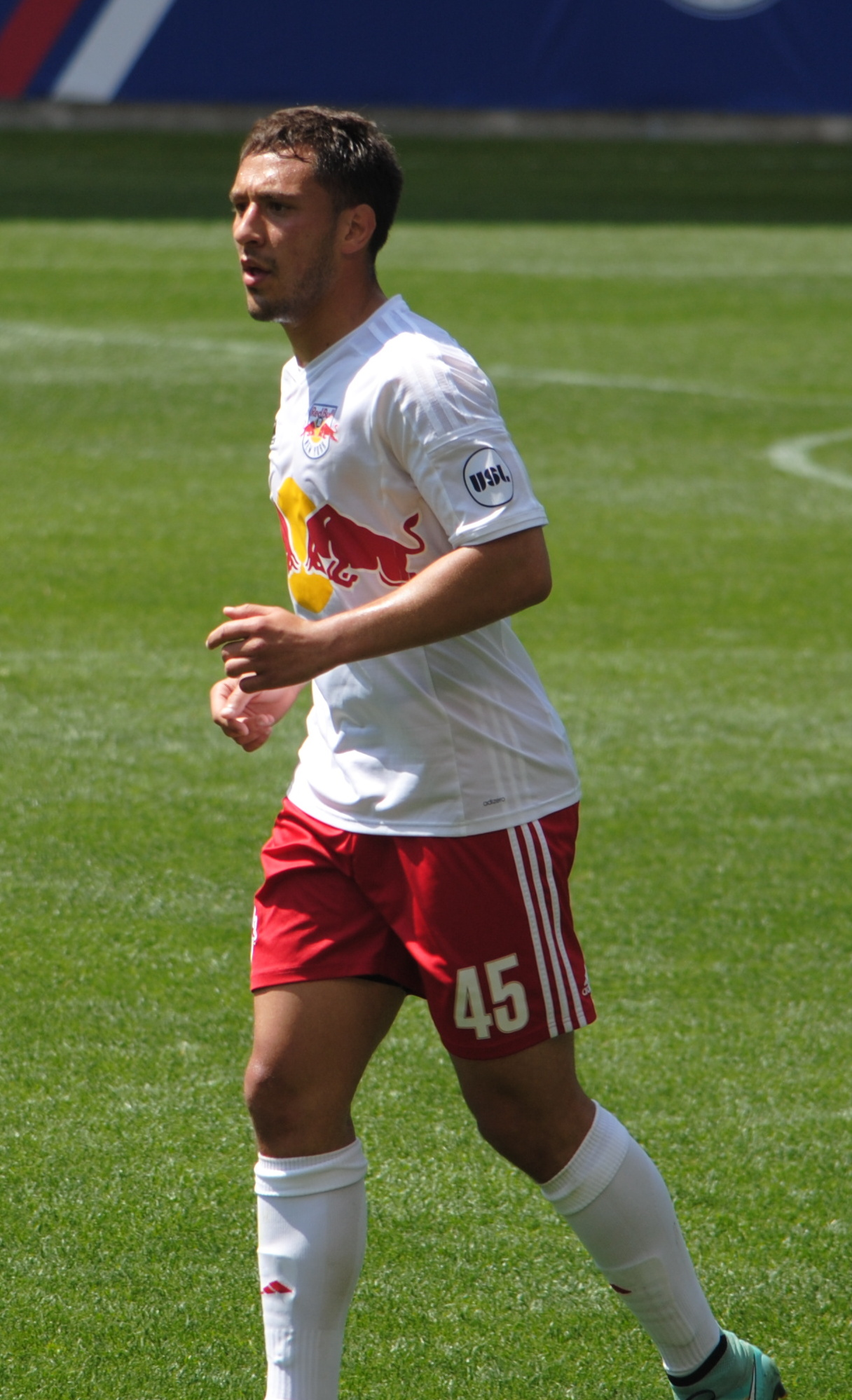

Personal information
- Full name: Christopher Paul Tsonis
- Date of birth: April 2, 1991 (age 35)
- Place of birth: Dartmouth, Massachusetts, United States
- Height: 1.80 m (5 ft 11 in)
- Position: Forward

Youth career
- 2008–2009: New England Revolution

College career
Years	Team	Apps	(Gls)
2009–2012	Southern New Hampshire Penmen		

Senior career*
Years	Team	Apps	(Gls)
2011	New Hampshire Phantoms	13	(8)
2012	Ventura County Fusion	10	(3)
2013	UMF Tindastóll	22	(7)
2014	Fjölnir Reykjavík	22	(5)
2015	New York Red Bulls II	26	(5)
2016	Charleston Battery	22	(1)
- * Club domestic league appearances and goals as of September 28, 2016 ‡ National team caps and goals as of January 19, 2014

Chris Tsonis (born April 2, 1991) is an American professional soccer player.

== Career ==
=== Youth and college ===
Tsonis began his career in the New England Revolution Academy, joining the club in 2008. In 2009, he joined Southern New Hampshire University and in his four seasons at the school he appeared in 83 matches and scored 40 goals. During his college career he also played with USL PDL sides New Hampshire Phantoms and Ventura County Fusion.

=== Professional ===
In February 2013 Tsonis signed with Icelandic club UMF Tindastóll. In his one season at the club Tsonis appeared in 21 matches and scored 7 goals as the club maintained its First Division status. His play with Tindastóll drew the attention of newly promoted top flight club Fjölnir Reykjavík. Tsonis signed with the club for the 2014 season and scored 5 goals in 21 appearances.

Tsonis signed with New York Red Bulls II for the 2015 season and made his debut as a starter for the side in its first ever match on March 28, 2015, in a 0–0 draw with Rochester Rhinos. On May 30, 2015, Tsonis scored his first goal for New York in a 4–2 loss to Richmond Kickers. On June 30, 2015, Tsonis scored the loan goal for New York Red Bulls II in a 1–0 victory over Wilmington Hammerheads. On July 25, 2015, Tsonis scored twice for New York, helping Red Bull II to a 4–2 victory over Richmond Kickers.

In 2016, Tsonis signed with United Soccer League club Charleston Battery.
