= Colin Heffron =

English footballer

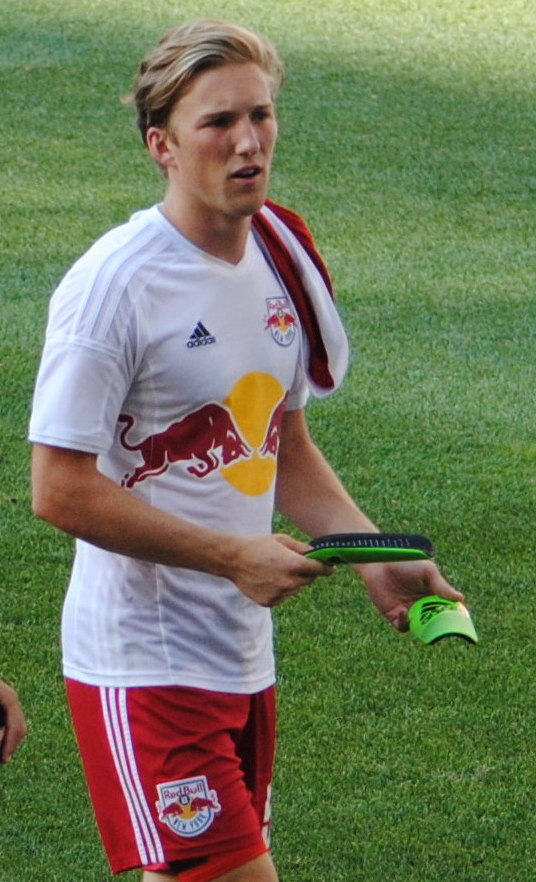

Personal information
- Full name: Colin Heffron
- Date of birth: 6 December 1992 (age 33)
- Place of birth: London, England
- Positions: Defender; midfielder

Youth career
- 2010–2011: Albertson SC

College career
Years	Team	Apps	(Gls)
2011–2014	Dartmouth Big Green	63	(9)

Senior career*
Years	Team	Apps	(Gls)
2015	New York Red Bulls II	16	(0)
- * Club domestic league appearances and goals as of 28 March 2015 ‡ National team caps and goals as of 19 January 2014

Colin Heffron (born 6 December 1992) is a professional footballer who plays as a defender.

== Career ==
=== Youth and college ===
Heffron was born in London and moved to Upper Brookville, New York at a young age, had a successful career at Friends Academy before joining the Dartmouth Big Green in 2011. Heffron was a four-year starter for Dartmouth and played in 63 games and had nine goals and 15 assists in his collegiate career.

=== Professional ===
Heffron went on trial with Major League Soccer club New York Red Bulls during the 2015 pre-season. He caught the attention of the club and signed with New York Red Bulls II for the 2015 season. He made his debut as a starter for the side in its first ever match on 28 March 2015 in a 0–0 draw with Rochester Rhinos. His performance against Rochester earned Heffron USL Team of the Week honours as he played both as a centre back and left back during the match.

On 23 July 2015, Heffron made his debut with the New York Red Bulls first team in a 4–2 victory over Premier League Champions Chelsea in a 2015 International Champions Cup match. Heffron assisted Sean Davis on his second goal of the match.
