= Andrew Jean-Baptiste =

Haitian footballer (born 1992)

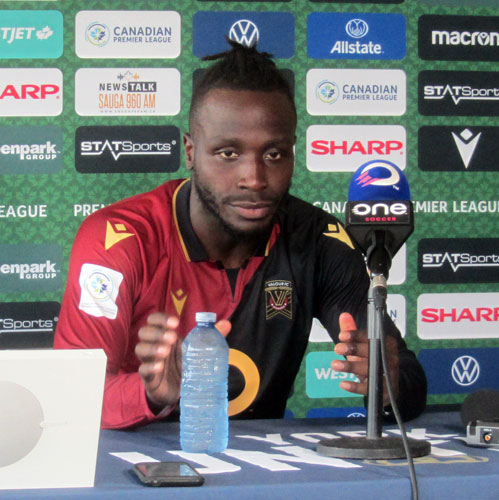
- Jean-Baptiste in 2022

Personal information
- Date of birth: 16 June 1992 (age 34)
- Place of birth: New York City, New York, United States
- Height: 1.88 m (6 ft 2 in)
- Position: Centre-back

Youth career
- 1998–2008: Brentwood Youth SC
- 2008–2010: Albertson SC

College career
Years	Team	Apps	(Gls)
2010–2011	Connecticut Huskies	45	(3)

Senior career*
Years	Team	Apps	(Gls)
2010	New York Red Bulls U-23		
2012–2013	Portland Timbers	31	(2)
2012	→ Los Angeles Blues (loan)	8	(0)
2014	Chivas USA	10	(0)
2015	New York Red Bulls	0	(0)
2015	→ New York Red Bulls II (loan)	10	(1)
2015–2016	Estrella San Agustín	20	(2)
2016–2017	Nyköpings BIS	32	(3)
2018	Terengganu II	1	(0)
2019	Umeå FC	11	(1)
2020–2023	Valour FC	40	(4)
2025	Westchester SC	14	(0)

International career^{‡}
2010	United States U18	2	(0)
2015–	Haiti	12	(2)
- * Club domestic league appearances and goals as of 1 November 2025 ‡ National team caps and goals as of 14 January 2020

Andrew Jean-Baptiste (born 16 June 1992) is a professional footballer who plays as a centre-back, he is currently a free agent after recently playing for Westchester SC in USL League One. Born in the United States, he plays for the Haiti national team.

== Club career ==
=== Early career ===
Jean-Baptiste attended Brentwood High School on Long Island, New York. He was honored with the 2009 Long Island player of the year presented by Newsday. He played college soccer with the Connecticut Huskies from 2010 to 2011. During his second year at UConn Jean-Baptiste was named the 2011 Big East Conference Defensive Player of the Year. During the 2010 season he also played for the New York Red Bulls U-23 team.

=== Portland Timbers ===
Jean-Baptiste was selected 8th overall by Portland Timbers in the first round of the 2012 MLS SuperDraft. In his first professional match for the Portland Timbers, Jean-Baptiste scored a header from a free-kick, assisted by Jack Jewsbury. Later in the season he was sent on loan to Los Angeles Blues and made 8 appearances for the club. During his second year Jean-Baptiste became a starter for Portland and appeared in 26 matches. Jean-Baptiste scored the game-winning goal on 13 July 2013 against the Los Angeles Galaxy, on a header from a corner kick by Diego Valeri.

=== Chivas USA ===
On 12 December 2013, Jean-Baptiste was traded to Chivas USA in exchange for Jorge Villafaña. In his one year with Chivas he appeared in 10 league matches, missing two months of the season due to injury.

=== New York Red Bulls ===
On 27 January 2015 the New York Red Bulls announced that they had signed Jean-Baptiste. Jean-Baptiste was loaned to affiliate side New York Red Bulls II during the 2015 season and made his debut for the side on 4 April 2015, coming on as a second-half substitute in a 4–1 victory over Toronto FC II, the first victory in club history.

Jean-Baptiste was released by New York Red Bulls on 26 June 2015.

=== Nyköpings BIS ===
After spending 14 months attempting to get a work permit in Spain, Jean-Baptiste signed for Swedish Ettan side Nyköpings BIS in August 2016. He became a key player for the club, earning a contract extension before the end of the 2016 season. Jean-Baptiste made ten league appearances that season and scored one goal. The following season, he made 22 league appearances, scoring two goals, and made another two appearances in the Svenska Cupen.

=== Umeå FC ===
In February 2019, Jean-Baptiste signed for Swedish Ettan side Umeå FC. He made eleven league appearances that season, scoring one goal, and helped the club earn promotion to the Superettan via playoffs. On 22 August 2019, the club announced that Jean-Baptiste's contract had been terminated after an unspecified off-field incident.

=== Valour FC ===
On 14 January 2020, Jean-Baptiste signed with Canadian Premier League side Valour FC. He made his debut for Valour on 16 August against Cavalry FC, playing the full 90 minutes in a 2–0 defeat. The club announced Jean-Baptiste's return for the 2021 season on 2 October 2020. On 22 July 2021 Valour announced Jean-Baptiste had suffered a torn ACL injury in his left knee, sidelining him for the rest of the 2021 season. On 18 October, he was re-signed for the 2022 season. In January 2024, Jean-Baptiste announced on his Twitter account that he was departing Valour FC after the expiration of his contract.

=== Westchester SC ===
In January 2025, he signed with Westchester SC in USL League One.

== International career ==
Jean-Baptiste represented the United States in 2010 at the Under 18 level.

He formally switched allegiance to the Haitian federation, and in June 2015 Jean-Baptiste was called up by the Haiti National team for the 2015 CONCACAF Gold Cup, and was on the bench for all 4 games. In May 2019 he was named to the Haitian squad for the 2019 CONCACAF Gold Cup.

In June 2023 Jean-Baptiste was named to Haiti's preliminary squad for the 2023 CONCACAF Gold Cup.

=== International goals ===
Scores and results list Haiti's goal tally first.

No	Date	Venue	Opponent	Score	Result	Competition
1.	6 January 2017	Ato Boldon Stadium, Couva, Trinidad and Tobago	Suriname	2–0	4–2	2017 CONCACAF Gold Cup qualification
2.	8 January 2017	Ato Boldon Stadium, Couva, Trinidad and Tobago	Trinidad and Tobago	4–3	4–3	2017 CONCACAF Gold Cup qualification

== Personal life ==
Jean-Bapiste was born in Brooklyn, New York City to a Haitian father and a Dominican Republic mother.
