= Gonzalo Verón =

Argentine footballer

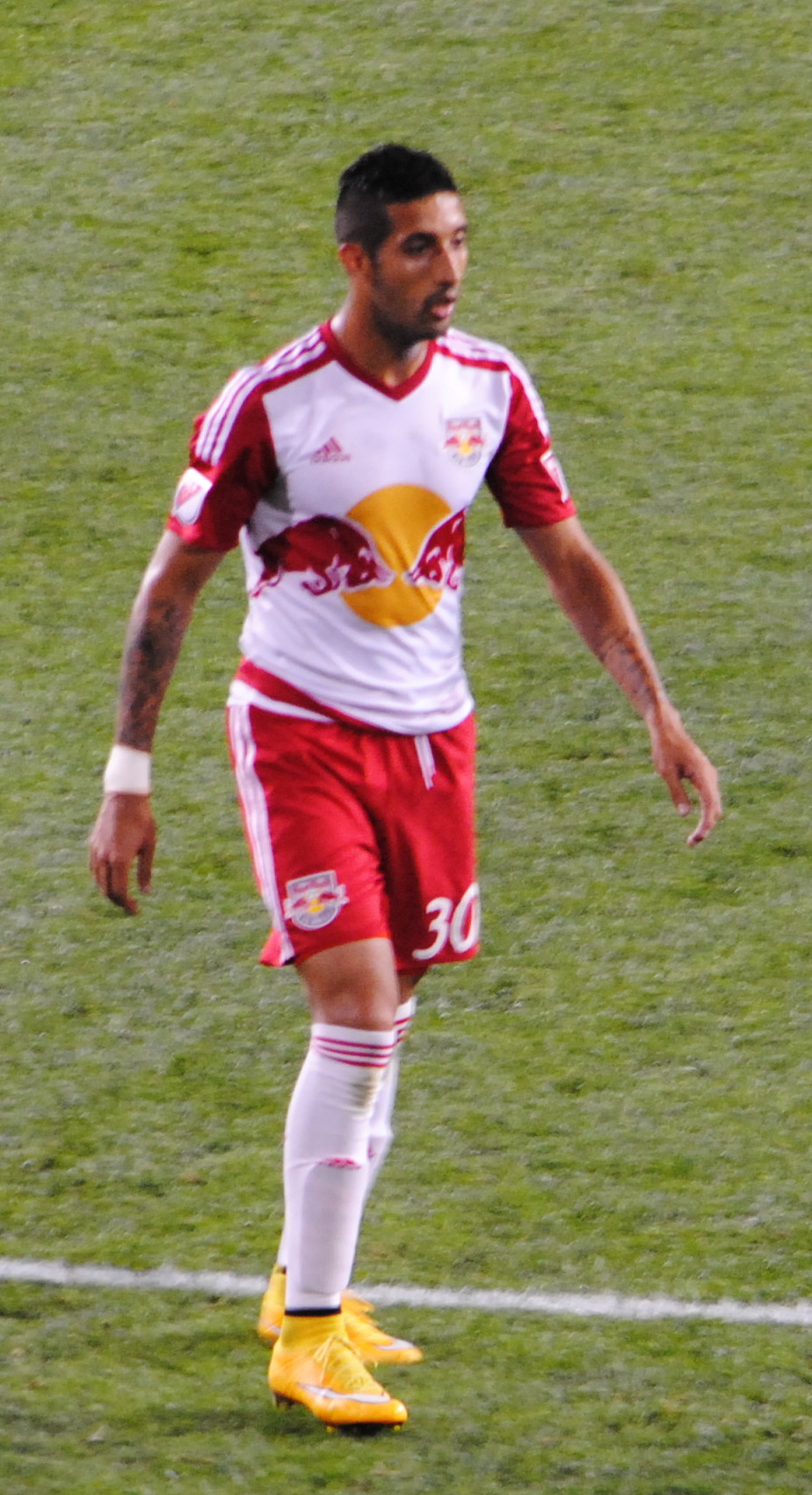
- Verón with the New York Red Bulls in 2015

Personal information
- Full name: Gonzalo Alberto Verón
- Date of birth: 24 December 1989 (age 36)
- Place of birth: Moreno, Buenos Aires, Argentina
- Height: 1.78 m (5 ft 10 in)
- Position: Winger

Youth career
- Arsenal de Sarandí
- Sportivo Italiano

Senior career*
Years	Team	Apps	(Gls)
2009–2012	Sportivo Italiano	62	(6)
2012–2015	San Lorenzo	52	(8)
2015–2017	New York Red Bulls	60	(10)
2016	→ New York Red Bulls II (loan)	1	(0)
2018–2020	Independiente	14	(1)
2019–2020	→ Aldosivi (loan)	16	(1)
2020–2021	Sol de América	3	(0)
2021–2022	Aucas	14	(2)
2022–2023	Universidad San Martín	44	(4)
2024	Angostura	2	(1)
- * Club domestic league appearances and goals as of 11:02, 23 December 2024 (UTC)

Gonzalo Alberto Verón (born 24 December 1989) is an Argentine footballer.

== Club career ==
=== Early career ===
Born in Moreno, Buenos Aires, Verón came through the youth set-up at Arsenal de Sarandí before moving to Sportivo Italiano.

=== Sportivo Italiano ===
Verón made his professional debut with Sportivo Italiano, at that time playing in Primera B Metropolitana, on 24 May 2009 in a 1–1 draw against Tristán Suárez. In his four seasons at the club, which included a promotion to Primera B Nacional, he appeared in 66 official matches scoring seven goals.

=== San Lorenzo de Almagro ===
In 2012, Verón swapped his old club Sportivo Italiano for top Argentine side San Lorenzo being recruited by Ricardo Caruso Lombardi. He made his Argentine Primera División debut for San Lorenzo on 8 September 2012 in a 2–1 victory over Colón de Santa Fé. After not featuring much under Caruso Lombardi, with the arrival of Juan Antonio Pizzi Verón saw his fortunes change and became a key player for San Lorenzo for the remainder of the season. He was a key part of the San Lorenzo attack alongside Ignacio Piatti, Héctor Villalba and Leandro Romagnoli. On 3 May 2013, he scored his first goal for San Lorenzo in a 2–1 victory over Quilmes. He continued his goal scoring form on 11 May 2013, scoring one goal in a 3–0 rout over Boca Juniors. In the next league game, on 19 May 2013 Verón once again scored for San Lorenzo in a 2–1 away victory over All Boys. On 27 May 2013, he scored in his fourth consecutive league match, this time scoring twice in a 4–2 victory over Unión de Santa Fe.

In October 2013, Verón suffered a serious knee injury that kept him out of the lineup for nearly seven months. Despite his injury, he was able to feature in 8 of the 19 matches in the 2013 Torneo Inicial, in which San Lorenzo claimed the title. He returned from injury on 17 July 2014 in a Copa Argentina match against Almirante Brown which ended in a 2–0 victory for San Lorenzo. He would regain his starting position at the club during the 2014 season, appearing in 15 matches (13 as a starter) and scoring 2 goals. On 28 August 2014, he scored his first goal after returning from injury and assisted Héctor Villalba on another in a 3–0 victory over Quilmes. On 2 November 2014, he helped San Lorenzo to a 2–0 victory over Boca Juniors, assisting Martín Cauteruccio on the first goal of the match and scoring five minutes later. He was also a key element in helping San Lorenzo to its first Copa Libertadores title as he appeared in both legs of the final against Nacional, which el Ciclón won by a 2–1 aggregate scoreline. He also appeared for San Lorenzo as a starter in the 2014 FIFA Club World Cup Final in which the Argentine club fell to Real Madrid by a 2–0 margin.

=== New York Red Bulls ===
On 4 August 2015, it was reported that Verón officially signed with the New York Red Bulls, with the MLS side paying a transfer fee of $2.2 million to San Lorenzo. Five days later, he made his debut for New York, appearing as a late match substitute in a 2–0 derby victory over New York City FC. On 15 August 2015, he scored his first goal for New York in a 3–0 victory over Toronto FC. Although being used primarily as a substitute during his first season; his speed and versatility off the bench helped play a strong role in New York winning their second Supporters' Shield.

During the 2016 pre-season, Veron scored a hat-trick in the club's final tune up before the season in a 5–1 victory against the Jacksonville Armada. However; he left the match with a hamstring injury that caused him to miss the opening weeks of the season. After missing the first few matches of the season with injury, he scored his first goal of the season on 21 May 2016 during a 7–0 victory in the Hudson River Derby. On 4 August, Veron made his first appearance in the CONCACAF Champions League against Antigua GFC. He recorded an assist in the match and was named to the team of the week for round one. On 7 August, Veron scored his second goal of the season helping New York to a 2–2 draw against the LA Galaxy.

On 18 June 2017, Veron came on as a late game substitute and helped New York to a 2–0 victory over Philadelphia Union, assisting on his team's two goals. On 5 July 2017, in his familiar role as a late game substitute, Veron scored an 89th-minute winner to lead New York to a 3–2 victory over New England Revolution. On 15 August, Veron scored New York's first goal in a 3–2 comeback victory over FC Cincinnati, helping to send New York to their first Open Cup final since 2003. On 25 August 2017, Veron scored on a penalty kick to help Red Bulls to a 1–1 draw against rival New York City FC.

=== Independiente ===
Following the 2017 MLS season, New York declined Veron's 2018 contract option and he entered the 2017 MLS Re-Entry Draft. On 21 December 2017, his MLS rights were selected by D.C. United in Stage Two of the draft. However, Veron did not agree to terms with D.C. and he instead signed with Argentinian side Independiente on 26 January 2018.

== Career statistics ==
As of 30 September 2017

Club	Season	League		Domestic Cup		League Cup		Continental		Total	
Club	Season	Apps	Goals	Apps	Goals	Apps	Goals	Apps	Goals	Apps	Goals
Sportivo Italiano	2008–09	2	0	0	0	0	0	0	0	2	0
Sportivo Italiano	2009–10	7	0	0	0	0	0	0	0	7	0
Sportivo Italiano	2010–11	18	0	0	0	0	0	0	0	18	0
Sportivo Italiano	2011–12	35	6	4	1	0	0	0	0	39	7
Sportivo Italiano	Total	62	6	4	1	0	0	0	0	66	7
San Lorenzo	2012–13	21	5	4	0	0	0	0	0	25	5
San Lorenzo	2013–14	8	1	1	0	0	0	5	0	14	1
San Lorenzo	2014	15	2	0	0	0	0	2	0	17	2
San Lorenzo	2015	8	0	1	1	0	0	2	0	11	1
San Lorenzo	Total	52	8	6	1	0	0	9	0	67	9
New York Red Bulls	2015	13	1	0	0	4	0	0	0	17	1
New York Red Bulls	2016	23	3	2	0	2	0	4	0	31	3
New York Red Bulls	2017	24	6	5	1	3	1	2	0	34	8
New York Red Bulls	Total	60	10	7	1	9	1	6	0	82	12
Career total		174	24	17	3	9	1	15	0	215	28

== Honours ==
Sportivo Italiano

- Primera B Metropolitana: 2008/09

San Lorenzo

- Argentine Primera División: 2013 Inicial
- Copa Libertadores: 2014

New York Red Bulls

- MLS Supporters' Shield (1): 2015
