= Damien Perrinelle =

French footballer (born 1983)

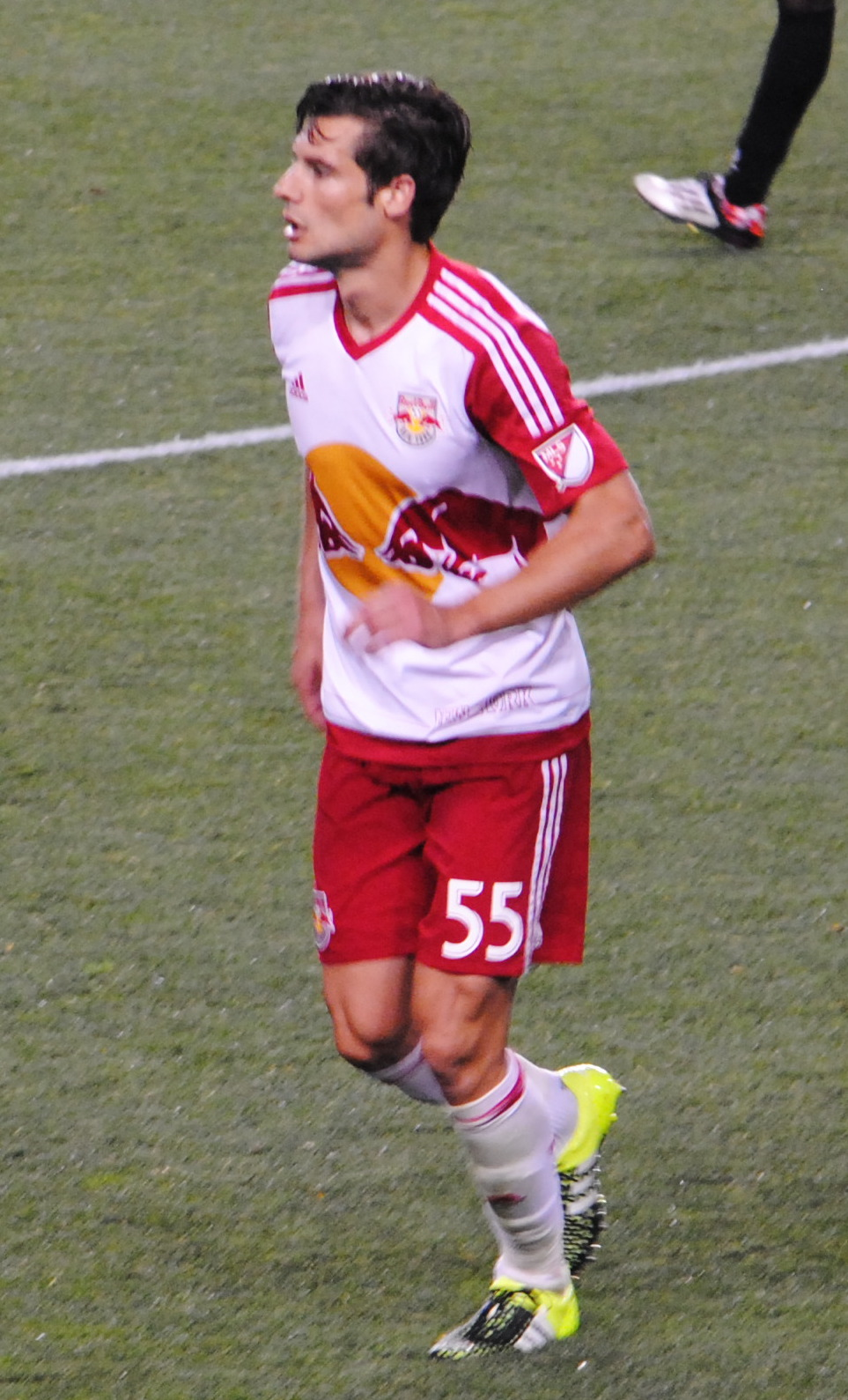

Personal information
- Date of birth: 12 September 1983 (age 43)
- Place of birth: Suresnes, France
- Height: 1.87 m (6 ft 2 in)
- Position: Defender

Team information
- Current team: Red Star (manager)

Youth career
- 1999–2004: Amiens

Senior career*
Years	Team	Apps	(Gls)
2004–2005	Créteil	24	(2)
2005–2006	Clermont	25	(0)
2006–2010	Boulogne	99	(6)
2010–2013	Clermont	73	(4)
2014	Istres	13	(0)
2014–2017	New York Red Bulls	65	(2)
2016	New York Red Bulls II	2	(0)
2018	Le Touquet	1	(0)
2019	Racing Club de France	5	(0)
Total		305	(13)

Managerial career
- 2020–2022: Monaco (assistant)
- 2022–2024: Monaco B
- 2024–2026: Monaco (assistant)
- 2026–: Red Star
- * Club domestic league appearances and goals

Damien Perrinelle (born 12 September 1983) is a French professional football coach and a former player who played as a defender. He is the manager of Ligue 2 club Red Star.

== Career ==
=== France ===
Born in Suresnes, in the western suburbs of Paris, Perrinelle began his career in the youth system of Amiens and in 2004 joined Créteil with whom he made his professional debut. In 2005, he joined Ligue 2 side Clermont, where he stayed just one season before moving to Boulogne, then of the Championnat National.

He spent four seasons at Boulogne, and was part of the team that won promotion to Ligue 2 in 2007 and promotion to Ligue 1 in 2009 under manager Philippe Montanier. On the final match day of the 2007–08 Ligue 2 season Perinelle scored a famous goal for Boulogne in a home match against Chamois Niortais, who were one place above Boulogne. A tense game saw Boulogne win the match in the 95th minute through a goal by Perrinelle which kept Boulogne up whilst sending Niort down to the Championnat National. Perrinelle scored his first goal in Ligue 1 on 23 December 2009 in a 2–2 draw against Nice. In four years at the club Perrinelle appeared in 99 league matches and scored 6 goals.

In the summer of 2010, he rejoined Clermont on a three-year contract. In his first season back with the club he quickly established himself as a key player starting 36 league matches and scoring 3 goals. During his second stint at the club he captained the team during its run in the 2010–11 Coupe de France and made 73 league appearances scoring 4 goals. He left Clermont at the end of his contract in June 2013.

Perrinelle received offers from clubs in Greece and trialed with New York Red Bulls after leaving Clermont. Six-months later, he joined Ligue 2 club Istres on 30 January 2014. During his half season at the club Perrinelle established himself as a starter making 13 league appearances.

=== New York Red Bulls ===
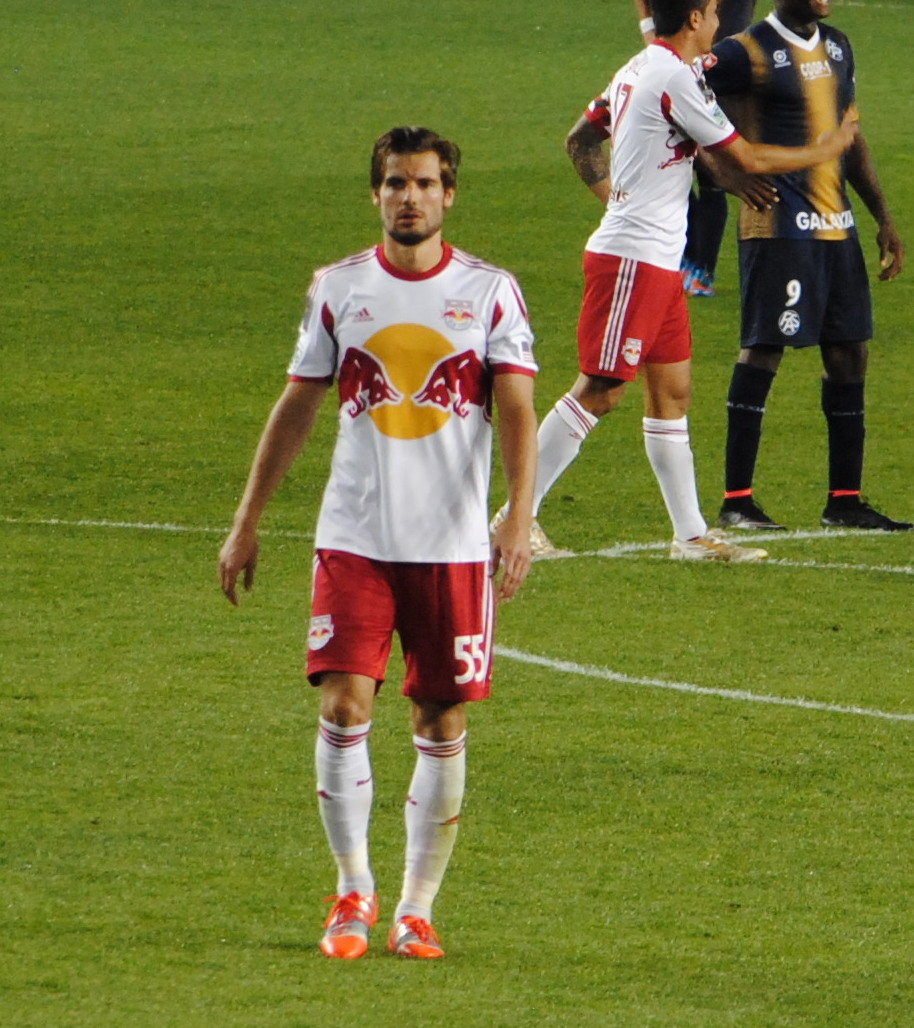
Perrinelle playing for New York Red Bulls in 2014

On 28 July 2014 Perrinelle joined New York Red Bulls after a successful second trial with the club. On 26 August 2014 Perrinelle made his debut for New York starting in a 2–0 victory over C.D. FAS in the 2014–15 CONCACAF Champions League. Perinelle made his MLS debut on 4 October 2014 against the Houston Dynamo coming on as an injury sub for Ibrahim Sekagya in the 88th minute in a 1–0 victory for New York.

Perinelle began the 2015 season as a starter for New York and on 22 March 2015 helped the club to a 2–0 victory in the home opener over rival D.C. United at Red Bull Arena. The following week Perinelle was selected to the MLS Team of the Week for his performance in a 2–1 victory over Columbus Crew. On 11 April 2015 Perinelle scored his first goal for New York in a 2–2 draw against D.C. United, a match in which the team was trailing by two goals. On 20 September 2015 Perrinelle scored his second goal of the season for New York with a looping header to help the club to a 2–0 victory over Portland Timbers. Perrinelle was named to the MLS Team of the Week for his performance in New York's 2–1 victory over Chicago Fire on 25 October 2015, which helped Red Bulls clinch the 2015 MLS Supporters' Shield. In their following match in the Conference Semifinals of the MLS Cup Playoffs, Perinelle suffered a torn ACL, sidelining him for an estimated 5–7 months.

On 26 June 2016, Perrinelle was loaned to New York Red Bulls II to play minutes with the Red Bulls' reserve side before returning to the first team. Later that day, he played 35 minutes in a 4–0 victory against the Wilmington Hammerheads. It was his first action in a competitive match since November 2015.

=== Back to France, and Monaco ===
In 2018, he came back to France and played for Le Touquet for two months. He joined Racing Colombes in January 2019.

From 2019 to 2020, he was a radio consultant on RMC, he participated in the programme After Foot.

In 2020, he joined Monaco as a supervisor. In June 2022, he was appointed reserve team coach for the 2022–2023 season.

== Coaching career ==
On 14 June 2026, Perrinelle was hired as a head coach by Ligue 2 club Red Star.

== Honours ==
New York Red Bulls

- MLS Supporters' Shield : 2015
