= Marius Obekop =

Cameroonian footballer

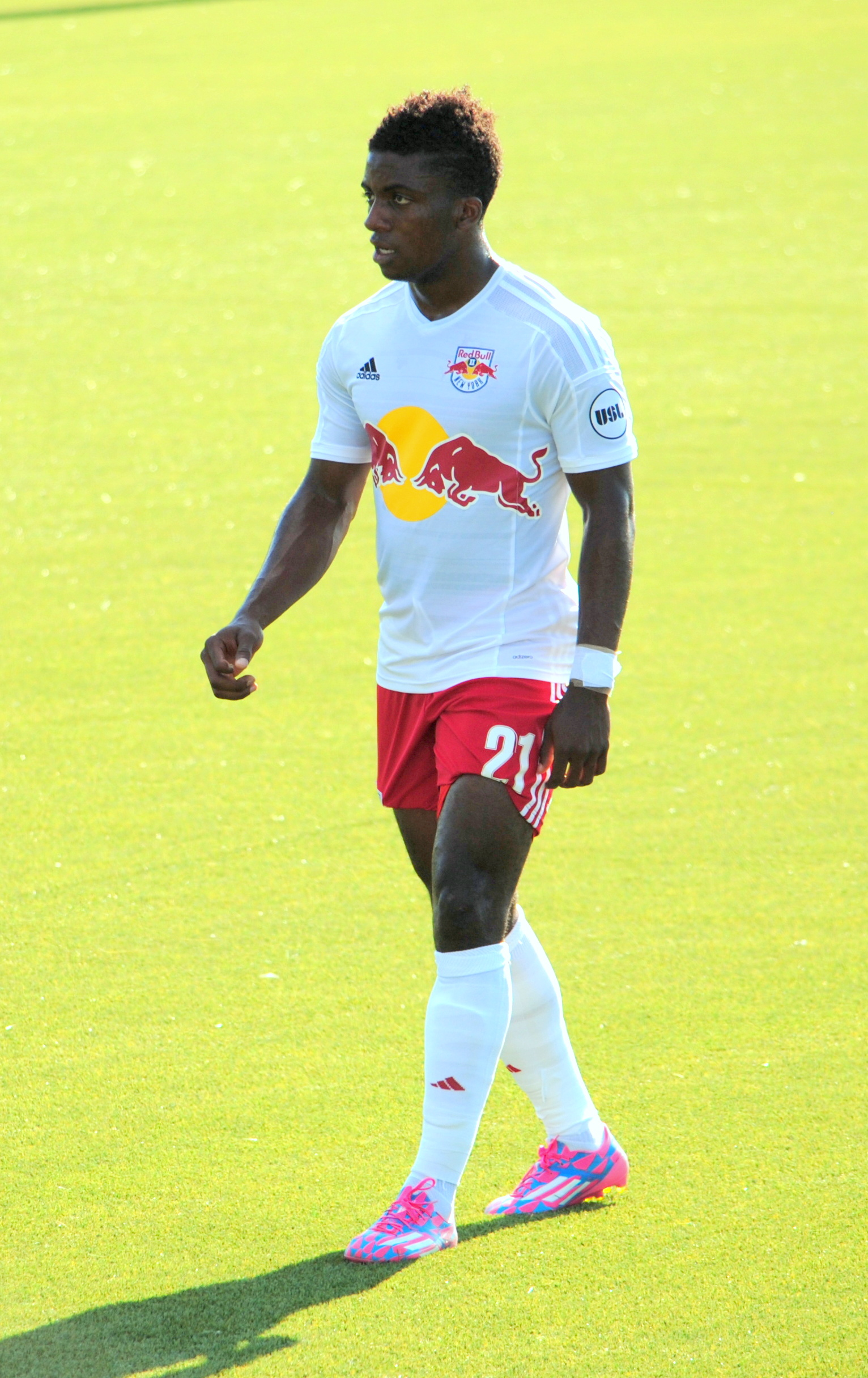
- Marius Obekop playing for New York Red Bulls II in 2015

Personal information
- Date of birth: 19 December 1994 (age 31)
- Place of birth: Yaoundé, Cameroon
- Height: 1.78 m (5 ft 10 in)
- Position: Midfielder

Team information
- Current team: Bălți
- Number: 28

Youth career
- Arsenal de Yaounde

Senior career*
Years	Team	Apps	(Gls)
2010–2012	Renaissance	18	(5)
2013–2015	New York Red Bulls	8	(0)
2013–2015	New York Red Bulls Reserves (loan)	16	(6)
2015	→ New York Red Bulls II (loan)	20	(6)
2016	Orlando City B	18	(0)
2017	Zaria Bălți	9	(4)
2018	Zimbru Chișinău	12	(4)
2019–2020	Nantong Zhiyun	18	(4)
2021	Masafi		
2021–2022	Al-Diriyah		
2022–2024	Masafi		
2024–2025	Bălți	17	(4)
2025–2026	Al-Ahli Club		
2026–	Real Kashmir	1	(0)

International career
2010–2011	Cameroon U17	30	(16)
2012	Cameroon U20	2	(0)
- * Club domestic league appearances and goals as of 18 March 2026

Marius Obekop (born 19 December 1994) is a Cameroonian professional footballer who plays as a midfielder for Indian Football League club Real Kashmir.

== Career ==
=== Early career ===
Obekop spent the majority of his youth career with Arsenal de Yaounde before joining Renaissance FC de Ngoumou in the Elite One, Cameroon's top division. He made his debut with Renaissance on 19 December 2010 in a match against Caiman Douala scoring on a shot from outside the box. Upon joining the club Obekop forced his way into the starting lineup and was a key player in helping Renaissance maintain its top flight status. In the 2012 season Obekop played 18 games for Renaissance in the league while also scoring five goals.

=== New York Red Bulls ===
In November 2012 scouts from Major League Soccer in the United States went to observe the top young Cameroonian players as selected by the Cameroonian Football Federation. Obekop impressed the American talent evaluators and earned a trial with New York Red Bulls in January 2013. On 18 March 2013 the Red Bulls announced that they had agreed to terms with Obekop. Obekop then made his professional debut with the team on 17 April 2013 against Sporting Kansas City.

=== New York Red Bulls II ===
Obekop was loaned to affiliate side New York Red Bulls II during the 2015 season and made his debut as a starter for the side in its first ever match on 28 March 2015 in a 0–0 draw with Rochester Rhinos. On 4 April 2015 Obekop scored his first goal for New York Red Bulls II, converting from the penalty spot to help the club to a 4–1 victory over Toronto FC II, the first victory in club history. On 27 June 2015 Obekop scored the opening goal for the club in a 4–1 victory over Saint Louis FC. On 2 August 2015 Obekop scored the first goal of the match for New York in a 2–1 victory against Saint Louis FC. On 29 August 2015 Obekop scored his fifth goal of the season for NYRBII in a 2–0 victory over Wilmington Hammerheads FC.

=== Orlando City B ===
On 13 January 2016, Obekop signed with United Soccer League's Orlando City B. In his one season in Orlando Obekop appeared in 19 matches for the side.

== International career ==
Obekop has represented Cameroon at the Under-17 and Under-20 levels. In 2010, he made his debut with the U-17s and scored 12 goals in 15 matches. The following year he appeared in 15 U-17 Cup of Nations qualifiers and scored 4 goals. In 2012, he appeared in 2 matches for the U-20s.

== Career statistics ==
As of 31 December 2019

Club	Season	League			Cup		Continental		Total	
Club	Season	Division	Apps	Goals	Apps	Goals	Apps	Goals	Apps	Goals
Renaissance	2010-11	Elite One	0	0	0	0	-		0	0
Renaissance	2012	Elite One	18	5	0	0	-		18	5
Renaissance	Total		18	5	0	0	0	0	18	5
New York Red Bulls	2013	Major League Soccer	5	0	0	0	-		5	0
New York Red Bulls	2014	Major League Soccer	2	0	0	0	3	0	5	0
New York Red Bulls	2015	Major League Soccer	1	0	0	0	-		1	0
New York Red Bulls	Total		8	0	0	0	3	0	11	0
New York Red Bulls Reserves (loan)	2013	MLS Reserve League	12	5	-		-		12	5
New York Red Bulls Reserves (loan)	2014	MLS Reserve League	4	1	-		-		4	1
New York Red Bulls Reserves (loan)	Total		16	6	0	0	0	0	16	6
New York Red Bulls II (loan)	2015	United Soccer League	22	6	-		-		22	6
Orlando City B	2016	United Soccer League	19	0	-		-		19	0
Zaria Bălți	2017	Moldovan National Division	9	4	0	0	0	0	9	4
Zimbru Chișinău	2018	Moldovan National Division	12	4	2	1	-		14	5
Nantong Zhiyun	2019	China League One	18	4	0	0	-		18	4
Career total			122	29	2	1	3	0	127	30
