= Shawn McLaws =

American professional soccer player (born 1993)

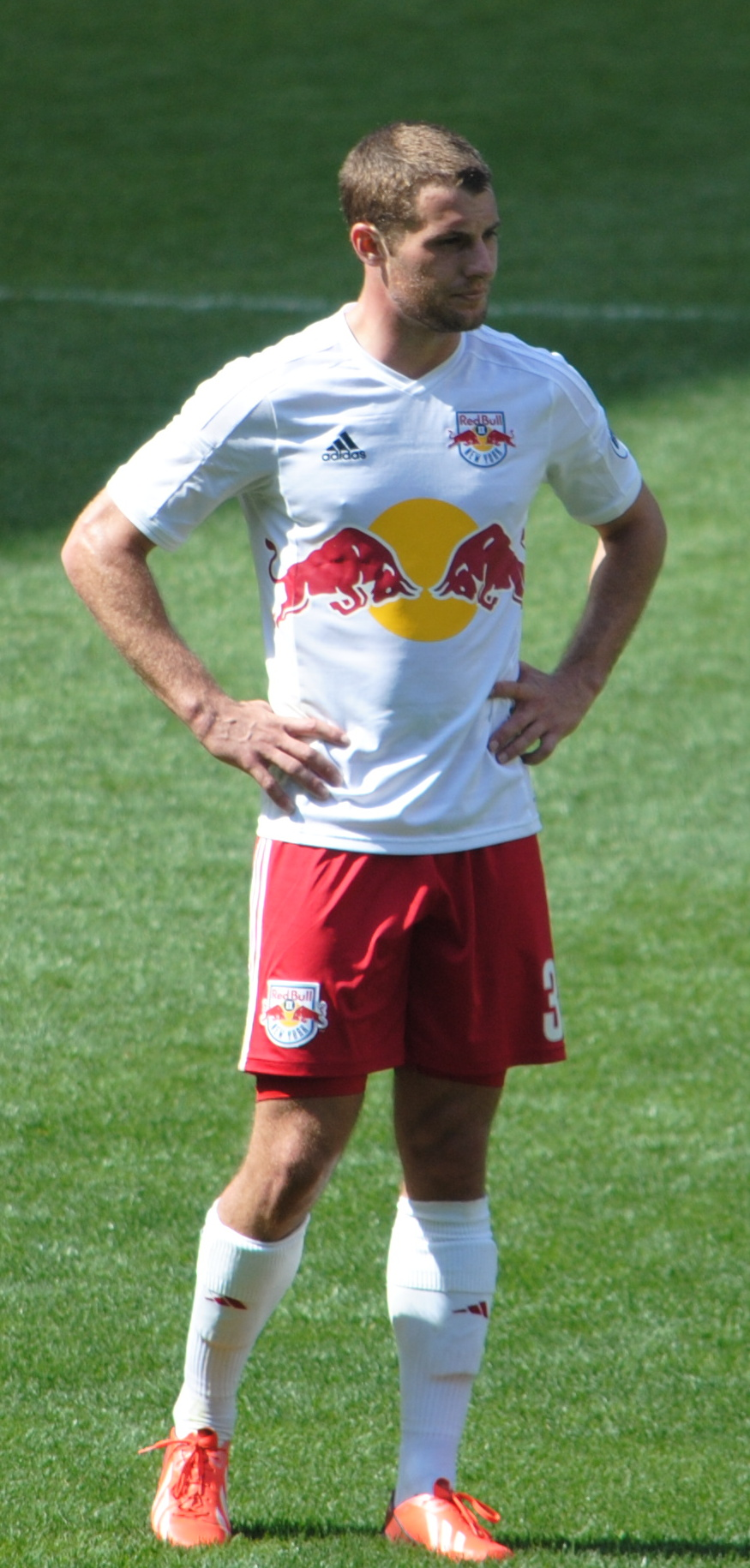

Personal information
- Full name: Shawn McLaws
- Date of birth: 9 March 1993 (age 33)
- Place of birth: Edmond, Oklahoma, United States
- Height: 1.78 m (5 ft 10 in)
- Position: Defender

Youth career
- Deer Creek Antlers

College career
Years	Team	Apps	(Gls)
2011–2014	Coastal Carolina Chanticleers		

Senior career*
Years	Team	Apps	(Gls)
2013–2014	Ocean City Nor'easters	24	(5)
2015	New York Red Bulls	0	(0)
2015	→ New York Red Bulls II (loan)	21	(1)
2016–2017	Harrisburg City Islanders	57	(0)
2018	Oklahoma City Energy	12	(0)
- * Club domestic league appearances and goals as of October 29, 2018

Shawn McLaws (born March 9, 1993) is an American professional soccer player who plays as a defender.

== Career ==
=== High school ===
McLaws attended Deer Creek High School in Edmond, OK where he lettered in football and soccer. McLaws graduated in 2011.

=== Early career ===
McLaws spent four years at Coastal Carolina University between 2011 and 2014. In his four years with Coastal Carolina he made 89 appearances and scored 1 goal and provided 17 assists. In his last year he was named Big South Defensive Player of the Year. While at college, McLaws appeared for USL PDL club Ocean City Nor'easters during their 2013 and 2014 seasons, serving as team captain in 2014.

=== New York Red Bulls ===
McLaws was selected with the 59th overall pick in the 2015 MLS SuperDraft by New York Red Bulls. On February 21, 2015, McLaws appeared in his first match for New York, a 1-0 preseason victory over Oklahoma City Energy FC. He officially joined the club on March 5, 2015

McLaws was loaned to affiliate side New York Red Bulls II during the 2015 season and made his debut as a starter for the side on April 4, 2015, scoring his first professional goal in the 4–1 victory over Toronto FC II. His performance against Toronto FC II earned McClaws USL Team of the Week honors.

On February 12, 2016, McLaws was waived by the Red Bulls.
