= Santiago Castaño =

American association football player (born 1995)

Santiago Castaño Palacio
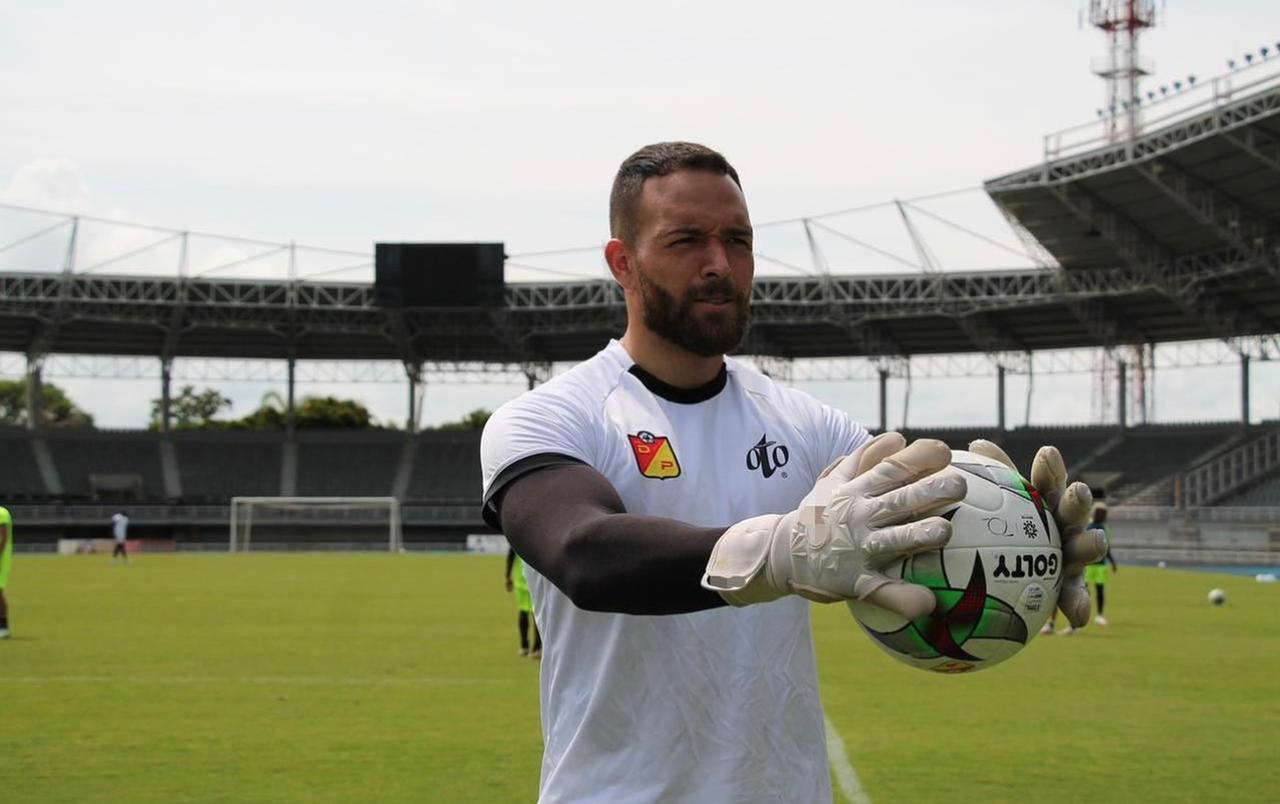

Personal information
- Date of birth: April 14, 1995 (age 31)
- Place of birth: Queens, New York, United States
- Height: 1.85 m (6 ft 1 in)
- Position: Goalkeeper

Youth career
- 2008–2013: New York Red Bulls

Senior career*
Years	Team	Apps	(Gls)
2013–2015	New York Red Bulls	0	(0)
2015	→ New York Red Bulls II (loan)	21	(0)
2019	New York Cosmos B	3	(0)
2020	New York Cosmos	0	(0)
2021–2022	Deportivo Pereira	10	(0)

International career^{‡}
2014	United States U20	4	(0)
- * Club domestic league appearances and goals as of March 28, 2015 ‡ National team caps and goals as of March 16, 2023

Santiago Castaño (born April 14, 1995) is an American professional soccer player who played as a goalkeeper.

== Career ==
=== Professional ===
Santiago Castaño joined the Red Bulls Academy in September 2008 and played for New York's U-14, U-15, U-16, and U-18 teams. He trained with the first team as an academy player before signing his first professional contract in 2012. During his first two years with the club he served as the team's third goalkeeper.

Castaño made his professional debut at the age of 19 playing for New York Red Bulls II, the affiliate of his team, on March 28, 2015, in a 0–0 draw against Rochester Rhinos. Castaño was named to the USL Team of the Week for his performance for NYRBII on August 22, 2015, in a 2–0 victory over Toronto FC II, a match in which he made six saves and recorded his fourth clean sheet of the season. He was released by New York on January 25, 2016.

After leaving Red Bulls, Castaño left for Colombia, joining Socrates Valencia F.C in the Colombian Third Division. On December 7, 2017, he scored from the penalty spot to help his club to a 2–1 victory over Fantasías Nueva York in the Copa Ciudad Pereira. He scored three goals (penalty kicks) with the club during the 2017 season.

For the 2017–18 season he was on the roster of TSF FC of the National Premier Soccer League.

On January 28, 2019, Castaño joined the New York Cosmos for the 2019 season.

=== International ===
Castaño has represented the United States at various youth levels, in 2014 he appeared in 4 matches for the United States men's national under-20 soccer team.

In December 2014 he accepted a call to join the Colombia national under-20 football team camp.

== Honors ==
Deportivo Pereira

- Categoría Primera A (1): 2022-II
