= Leo Stolz =

German footballer

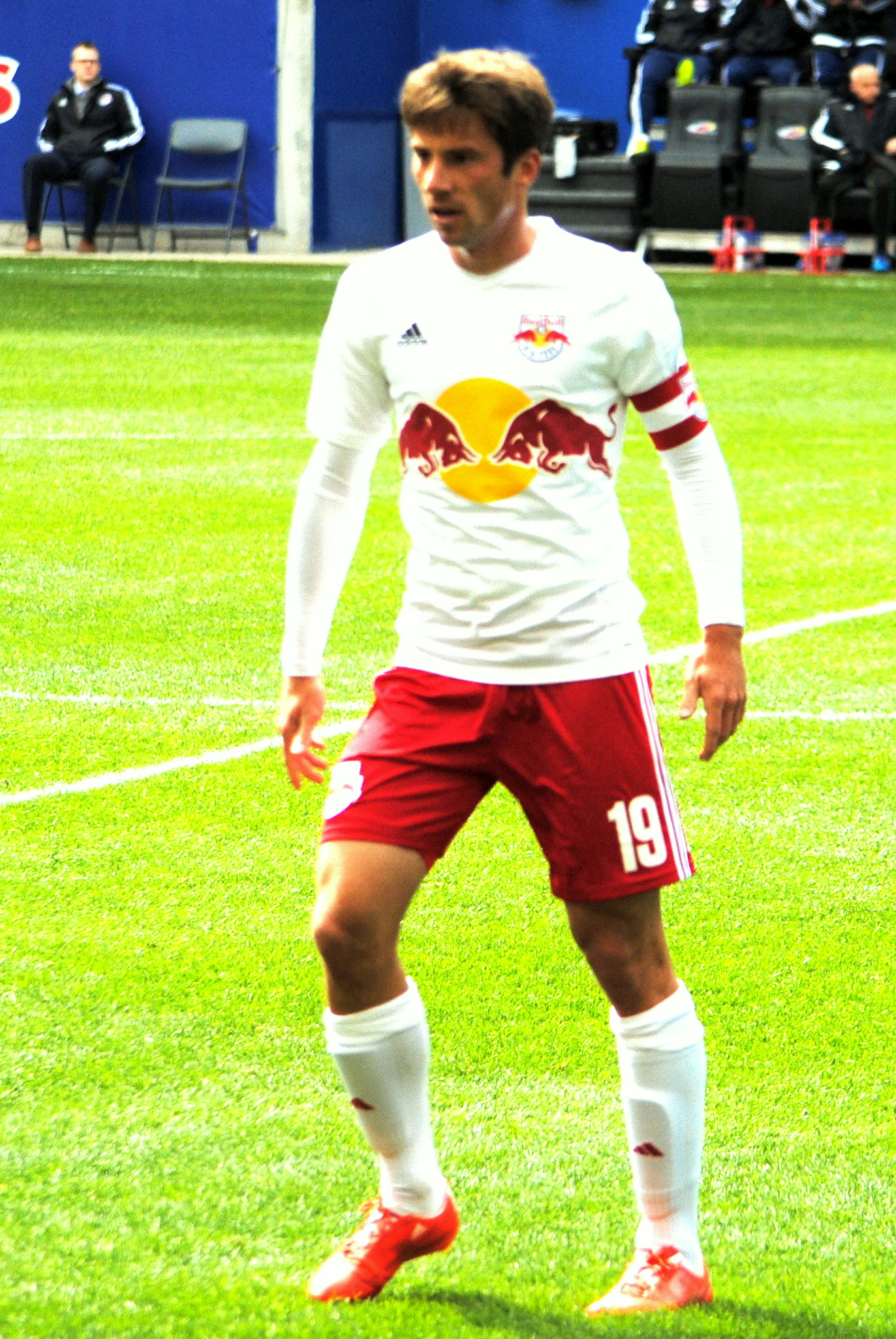
- Stolz with New York Red Bulls

Personal information
- Full name: Leonard Stolz
- Date of birth: 15 February 1991 (age 35)
- Place of birth: Munich, Germany
- Height: 1.81 m (5 ft 11 in)
- Position: Midfielder

Youth career
- 2004–2011: 1860 Munich

College career
Years	Team	Apps	(Gls)
2011	George Mason Patriots	18	(4)
2012−2014	UCLA Bruins	63	(20)

Senior career*
Years	Team	Apps	(Gls)
2010–2011	1860 Munich II	11	(0)
2015	New York Red Bulls	0	(0)
2015	→ New York Red Bulls II (loan)	22	(4)
Total		33	(4)
- * Club domestic league appearances and goals

Leo Stolz (born 15 February 1991) is a German former professional footballer who played as a midfielder.

== Career ==
=== Youth and college ===
Stolz began his career playing at SV Pullach. Soon he joined the youth system of 1860 Munich in 2004. He progressed in the youth system and became a regular starter for the club in the Under 19 Bundesliga. In 2010, he joined 1860 Munich II in the Regionalliga Süd. He made his debut for the team on 15 October 2010 in a 3–1 victory over SV Wehen Wiesbaden II. In his first season with Munich II Stolz appeared in 11 league matches as a central midfielder.

Stolz was offered a senior contract with Munich 1860 in 2011 but decided to play college soccer in the United States joining George Mason University. In his first season in the United States Stolz appeared in 18 matches and scored four goals. After a strong first season, Stolz decided to transfer to UCLA. In three years with the Bruins, Stolz played in 63 matches and scored 20 goals and recorded 22 assists. At the end of the 2014 season, Stolz was awarded the Hermann Trophy recognizing him as the top college soccer player in the country. Stolz and his UCLA team reached their first College Championship final in December 2014, but lost to Virginia on penalties.

Stolz graduated from ESADE Business School, Barcelona on 28 October 2017 successfully finishing his master's degree in international management.

=== New York Red Bulls ===
On 15 January 2015, Stolz was selected 18th overall by New York Red Bulls in the 2015 MLS SuperDraft. Stolz signed a contract with the Red Bulls on 17 January 2015.

Stolz was loaned to affiliate side New York Red Bulls II and captained the side in its first ever match on 28 March 2015 in a 0–0 draw with Rochester Rhinos. On 4 April 2015, Stolz scored his first goal for New York Red Bulls II in a 4–1 victory over Toronto FC II, the first victory in club history.

Stolz was released by Red Bulls at the end of the 2015 MLS season.
