= Manolo Sánchez (footballer, born 1991) =

Puerto Rican footballer

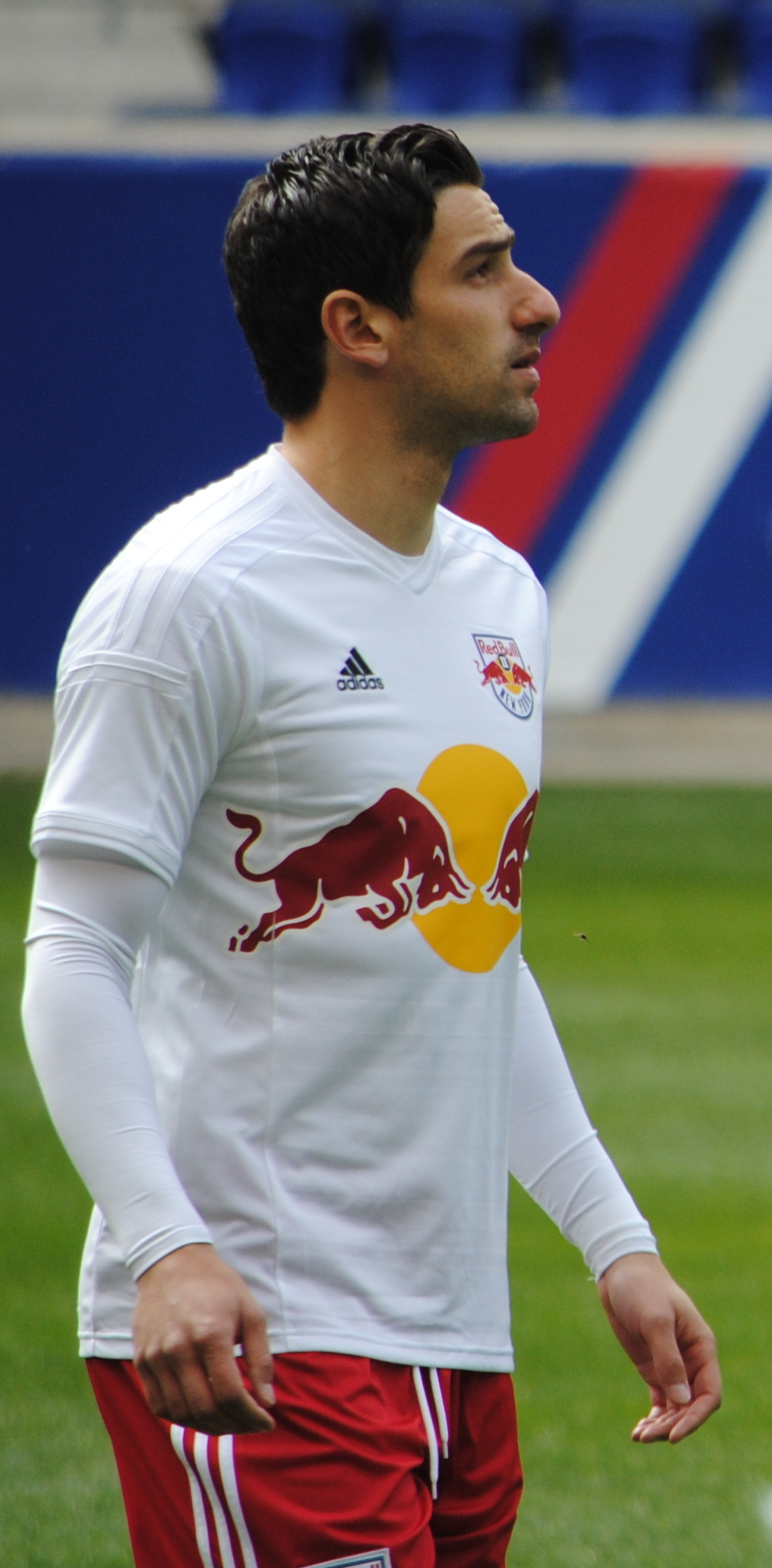
- Sánchez playing for the New York Red Bulls in 2015

Personal information
- Full name: Emanuel Sánchez
- Date of birth: November 10, 1991 (age 34)
- Place of birth: Philadelphia, Pennsylvania, United States
- Height: 1.83 m (6 ft 0 in)
- Position: Midfielder

College career
Years	Team	Apps	(Gls)
2010–2011	Louisville Cardinals	3	(0)
2012–2014	Clemson Tigers	62	(10)

Senior career*
Years	Team	Apps	(Gls)
2013–2014	Reading United	21	(7)
2015	New York Red Bulls	3	(0)
2015	→ New York Red Bulls II (loan)	24	(4)
2016	San Antonio FC	16	(1)
2017	Harrisburg City Islanders	10	(2)
2018	South Georgia Tormenta FC	4	(1)

International career^{‡}
2016	Puerto Rico	6	(1)
- * Club domestic league appearances and goals as of October 12, 2017 ‡ National team caps and goals as of September 3, 2016

Emanuel "Manolo" Sánchez (born November 10, 1991) is a Puerto Rican retired professional footballer who played as a midfielder.

== Career ==
=== Early career ===
Sanchez spent two years at the University of Louisville between 2010 and 2012, including a red-shirted year in 2010. He transferred to Clemson Tigers in January 2012. While at college, Sanchez appeared for USL PDL club Reading United AC during their 2013 and 2014 seasons.

=== New York Red Bulls ===
Sanchez was selected with the 79th overall pick in the 2015 MLS SuperDraft by New York Red Bulls. On February 21, 2015, Sanchez scored his first goal for New York in a 1-0 pre-season victory over Oklahoma City Energy FC. He officially joined the club on March 3, 2015.

Sanchez made his professional debut on March 28, 2015, featuring for New York Red Bulls II during a 0–0 draw against Rochester Rhinos. On May 3, 2015, Sanchez scored his first goal as a professional for New York Red Bulls II in a 3–2 victory over Pittsburgh Riverhounds. His performance against Pittsburgh earned Sanchez USL Team of the Week honors. On August 29, 2015, Sanchez opened the scoring for NYRBII in a 2–0 victory over Wilmington Hammerheads FC. On September 5, 2015, Sanchez scored the opening goal of the match for New York in a 3–2 victory over Louisville City FC. On September 26, 2015, Sanchez opened the scoring for New York Red Bulls II in a 4-2 extra time victory over Pittsburgh Riverhounds which advanced New York in the 2015 USL Playoffs.

=== San Antonio FC ===
Sanchez signed with United Soccer League side San Antonio FC on February 25, 2016. On May 7, Sanchez scored his first goal with the club in a 2–3 defeat to Rio Grande Valley FC Toros.

=== Harrisburg City Islanders ===
On March 21, 2017, Sánchez was announced as the new player for USL side Harrisburg City Islanders. He scored his first goal with Harrisburg on April 5, 2017, against his former team New York Red Bulls II.

=== South Georgia Tormenta FC ===
Sanchez was announced as a signing for then-PDL side South Georgia Tormenta on May 8, 2018. After appearances in the U.S. Open Cup and three regular season matches, Sanchez suffered a lower leg injury that kept him out for the remainder of the year.

On January 25, 2019, Sanchez announced his retirement from professional football.

== International ==
Manolo Sánchez began training with the Puerto Rico national football team in December 2015, and played an exhibition match against New York City FC on December 11, 2015. On May 22, 2016, Sánchez made his first official appearance for Puerto Rico, starting in a friendly match against the United States. Following that match, Sánchez was called up for the 2017 Caribbean Cup Qualification where he started both matches of the second round where Puerto Rico faced Grenada and Antigua and Barbuda. On September 3, 2016, Sánchez scored his first and only goal for Puerto Rico with a penalty kick in a friendly match against India in their 4–1 defeat.

== Career statistics ==
As of 7 May 2016

Club	Season	League		MLS Cup/Playoffs		US Open Cup		CONCACAF		Total	
Club	Season	Apps	Goals	Apps	Goals	Apps	Goals	Apps	Goals	Apps	Goals
New York Red Bulls	2015	3	0	0	0	1	0	0	0	4	0
New York Red Bulls	Total	3	0	0	0	1	0	0	0	4	0
New York Red Bulls II (loan)	2015	22	4	2	1	0	0	0	0	24	5
New York Red Bulls II (loan)	Total	22	4	2	1	0	0	0	0	24	5
San Antonio FC	2016	16	1	0	0	0	0	0	0	16	1
San Antonio FC	Total	16	1	0	0	0	0	0	0	16	1
Career total		41	5	2	1	1	0	0	0	44	6
