= 2017 Louisville City FC season =

Louisville City
2017 season
- Owner: John Neace
- Manager: James O'Connor
- Stadium: Louisville Slugger Field
- USL: 1st, Eastern
- U.S. Open Cup: Third Round
- USL Playoffs: Champions
- Top goalscorer: League: Luke Spencer (10 goals); All: Luke Spencer (11 goals)
- Highest home attendance: 13,812 (August 12 vs. FC Cincinnati)
- Lowest home attendance: 6,698 (September 20 vs. Rochester Rhinos)
- Average home league attendance: 8,601
- Biggest win: 5–0 (August 12 vs. FC Cincinnati) (August 23 vs. Harrisburg City)
- Biggest defeat: 0–3 (August 26 at Orlando City B)
Home colors	Away colors	Third colors

The 2017 Louisville City FC season was the club's third season in Louisville, Kentucky playing in the United Soccer League, which was one of the two second-tier leagues in the United States soccer league system.

The club began their pre-season campaign on March 4 before the league commenced on March 25. They also competed in the U.S. Open Cup.

Louisville City finished the season on top of the Eastern Conference for the first time in club history and had the second best record in the league overall for the third consecutive year. They also won the USL Cup after the season for the club's first title.

== Current squad ==
Final Roster.

No.	Name	Nationality	Date of birth (age)	Previous club
Goalkeepers
1	Greg Ranjitsingh	(Trinidad and Tobago)	July 18, 1993 (age 33)	(United States) Mercer University
13	Micah Bledsoe	(United States)	September 26, 1994 (age 32)	(United States) Lipscomb University
28	Tim Dobrowolski	(United States)	September 7, 1993 (age 33)	(United States) Loyola University Chicago
Defenders
4	Sean Totsch	(United States)	September 16, 1991 (age 35)	(United States) Rochester Rhinos
6	Tarek Morad	(United States)	August 21, 1992 (age 34)	(United States) Oklahoma City Energy
15	Sean Reynolds	(United States)	April 11, 1990 (age 36)	(Iceland) Fimleikafélag Hafnarfjarðar
18	Paco Craig	(England)	October 19, 1992 (age 34)	(United States) Young Harris College
Midfielders
7	Mark-Anthony Kaye	(Canada)	December 2, 1994 (age 31)	(Canada) Toronto FC II
8	Guy Abend	(Israel)	November 8, 1990 (age 35)	(Israel) Hapoel Rishon LeZion
10	Brian Ownby	(United States)	July 16, 1990 (age 36)	(United States) Richmond Kickers
11	Niall McCabe	(Republic of Ireland)	October 6, 1990 (age 36)	(United States) Chattanooga FC
19	Oscar Jimenez	(United States)	November 3, 1989 (age 37)	(United States) Mississippi Brilla
22	George Davis IV	(United States)	August 5, 1987 (age 39)	(United States) Richmond Kickers
23	Richard Ballard	(United States)	January 26, 1994 (age 32)	(United States) Indiana University
24	Kyle Smith	(United States)	January 9, 1992 (age 34)	(United States) Transylvania University
36	Paolo DelPiccolo	(United States)	May 28, 1991 (age 35)	(United States) Charlotte Independence
80	Devon Williams	(Jamaica)	April 8, 1992 (age 34)	(United States) New York Red Bulls II
Forwards
9	Cameron Lancaster	(England)	November 5, 1992 (age 33)	(England) St Albans City
12	Luke Spencer	(United States)	November 28, 1990 (age 35)	(United States) FC Cincinnati
14	Ilija Ilic	(Serbia)	April 26, 1991 (age 35)	(United States) Young Harris College

== Transfers ==
=== In ===
No.	Pos.	Player	Transferred from	Fee/notes	Date	Source
80	MF	(Jamaica) Devon Williams	(United States) New York Red Bulls II	Free Transfer	December 26, 2017	
3	MF	(Republic of Ireland) Sean Russell	(Republic of Ireland) Limerick	Free Transfer	January 3, 2017	
4	DF	(United States) Sean Totsch	(United States) Rochester Rhinos	Free Transfer	January 10, 2017	
10	MF	(United States) Brian Ownby	(United States) Richmond Kickers	Free Transfer	January 18, 2017	
23	FW	(United States) Richard Ballard	(United States) Indiana University	Free Transfer	February 6, 2017	
12	FW	(United States) Luke Spencer	(United States) FC Cincinnati	Free Transfer	February 9, 2017	
19	MF	(United States) Oscar Jimenez	(United States) Mississippi Brilla	Free Transfer	February 15, 2017	
19	GK	(United States) Micah Bledsoe	(United States) Lipscomb University	Free Transfer	March 28, 2017	

=== Out ===
No.	Pos.	Player	Transferred to	Fee/notes	Date	Source
20	DF	(United States) Enrique Montano	(United States) Sacramento Republic		November 10, 2016	
17	FW	(United States) Chandler Hoffman	(United States) Real Monarchs		November 17, 2016	
7	MF	(United States) Kadeem Dacres	(United States) FC Cincinnati		December 15, 2016	
2	DF	(United States) Ben Newnam	(United States) San Antonio		December 23, 2016	
4	MF	(United States) Aodhan Quinn	(United States) FC Cincinnati		January 13, 2017	
77	DF	(United States) Andrew Lubahn	(United States) San Francisco Deltas		February 22, 2017	
31	FW	(Haiti) Kenny Doublette	(United States) Derby City Rovers		May 5, 2017	
10	FW	(Denmark) Magnus Rasmussen	(Denmark) Boldklubben Frem		March 20, 2017	
19	DF	(South Korea) Jonghyun Son	Retired		November 11, 2016	
3	MF	(Republic of Ireland) Sean Russell	(Republic of Ireland) Drogheda United	Free Transfer	July 9, 2017	

== Competitions ==
=== Pre-season ===
March 4, 2017 Friendly	Louisville City FC	3–1	Young Harris College	Louisville, Kentucky
11:00AM	Lancaster 24'; Spencer 48'; Ballard 90'	Report	Stanley 32'	Stadium: LouCity Training Ground; Attendance: 100

March 8, 2017 Friendly	Lipscomb University	1–0	Louisville City FC	Elizabethtown, Kentucky
7:15PM	Sakou 74'	Report		Stadium: Elizabethtown Sports Park

March 15, 2017 Friendly	University of Kentucky	Canceled	Louisville City FC	Lexington, Kentucky
7:00PM		Report		Stadium: Wendell & Vickie Bell Soccer Complex

March 18, 2017 Friendly	Indy Eleven	1–1	Louisville City FC	Evansville, Indiana
6:00PM	Vuković 90'	Report	Lancaster 52'	Stadium: Arad McCutchan Stadium

=== USL ===
==== Eastern Conference standings ====
Pos	Team	Pld	W	D	L	GF	GA	GD	Pts	Qualification
1	Louisville City FC (C)	32	18	8	6	58	31	+27	62	Conference Playoffs
2	Charleston Battery	32	15	9	8	53	33	+20	54	Conference Playoffs
3	Tampa Bay Rowdies	32	14	11	7	50	35	+15	53	Conference Playoffs
4	Rochester Rhinos	32	14	11	7	36	28	+8	53	Conference Playoffs
5	Charlotte Independence	32	13	9	10	52	40	+12	48	Conference Playoffs

Source: 2017 USL standings
Rules for classification: 1) total wins; 2) total goal differential; 3) total goals scored; 4) points earned against top four Conference finishers; 5) disciplinary points; 6) coin toss or drawing of lots
(C) Champions

==== Results summary ====
Overall								Home						Away					
Pld	W	D	L	GF	GA	GD	Pts	W	D	L	GF	GA	GD	W	D	L	GF	GA	GD
32	18	8	6	58	31	+27	62	11	3	2	32	14	+18	7	5	4	26	17	+9

Source: Match reports

Round	1	2	3	4	5	6	7	8	9	10	11	12	13	14	15	16	17	18	19	20	21	22	23	24	25	26	27	28	29	30	31	32
Stadium	H	A	A	H	A	H	A	A	A	H	A	H	A	H	A	H	A	H	A	H	A	H	H	H	A	H	H	A	A	A	H	H
Result	D	W	W	W	D	D	L	W	D	W	W	W	L	W	D	L	W	W	L	W	W	W	L	W	W	D	W	D	L	D	W	W

Source: Match reports
A = Away; H = Home; W = Win; D = Draw; L = Loss

==== Results ====
March 25 1	Louisville City FC	0–0	Saint Louis FC	Louisville, Kentucky
2:00PM	DelPiccolo (yellow card) 42'; Spencer (yellow card) 90+3'	Report	Stojkov (yellow card) 50'; Gorrick (yellow card) 55'; Sheldon (yellow card) 56'; Mirkovic (yellow card) 89'	Stadium: Louisville Slugger Field; Attendance: 6,758; Referee: Calin Radosav

March 30 2	Orlando City B	1–3	Louisville City FC	Orlando, Florida
7:30PM	Morad (og) 42'; Cox (yellow card) 58'; Pereira (yellow card) 90+3'	Report	Lancaster 11'; Davis IV 57'; Spencer 76'	Stadium: Orlando City Stadium; Attendance: 2,741; Referee: Marcos de Oliveira

April 8 3	Richmond Kickers	0–1	Louisville City FC	Richmond, Virginia
5:00PM	E.Lee (yellow card) 25'; A.Lee (yellow card) 41'	Report	Davis IV 81' (pen.) (yellow card) 10'	Stadium: City Stadium (Richmond); Attendance: 7.603; Referee: Danielle Chesky

April 15 4	Louisville City FC	2–1	Tampa Bay Rowdies	Louisville, Kentucky
7:30PM	Davis IV 22' (yellow card) 31'; Spencer (yellow card) 45+5'; Smith (yellow card) 83'; Lancaster 87'	Report	Boden (yellow card) 57'; King (yellow card) 63'; Hristov (yellow card) 71'; Paterson 89'	Stadium: Louisville Slugger Field; Attendance: 9,074; Referee: Andrew Musashe

April 22 5	FC Cincinnati	1–1	Louisville City FC	Cincinnati, Ohio
7:00PM	Mansaray (yellow card) 31'; Berry (yellow card) 51'; Walker (yellow card) 70'; Quinn 78'; Fall (red card) 87'	Report	Ownby 20'; Totsch (yellow card) 22'; DelPiccolo (yellow card) 84'	Stadium: Nippert Stadium; Attendance: 20,437; Referee: Mark Kadlecik

April 29 6	Louisville City FC	0–0	Toronto FC II	Louisville, Kentucky
7:30PM	Spencer (yellow card) 61'; Ballard (yellow card) 80'	Report	James (yellow card) 29'	Stadium: Louisville Slugger Field; Attendance: 8,282; Referee: Ismir Pekmic

May 13 7	Tampa Bay Rowdies	2–0	Louisville City FC	St. Petersburg, Florida
7:30PM	King (yellow card) 46'; Hristov 59'; Lowe (yellow card) 70'; Brown 72'; Collins (yellow card) 73'; Schafer (yellow card) 78'; Chavez (yellow card) 89'	Report	Craig (yellow card) 87'	Stadium: Al Lang Stadium; Attendance: 5,410; Referee: Guido Gonzalez Jr.

May 20 8	Pittsburgh Riverhounds	1–0	Louisville City FC	Pittsburgh, Pennsylvania
7:00PM	Greenspan (yellow card) 41'	Report	Spencer 7'; Kaye (yellow card) 45'; Craig (yellow card) 75'; DelPiccolo (red card) 87'	Stadium: Highmark Stadium; Attendance: 3,253; Referee: Jonathan Weiner

June 3 9	Charleston Battery	4–4	Louisville City FC	Charleston, South Carolina
7:00PM	Williams 11', 32' (yellow card) 77'; Lasso (yellow card) 23'; Chang 48'; Garbanzo 73'; Marini (yellow card) 88'	Report	Jimenez 45+1'; Davis IV 60'; Smith (yellow card) 61'; Brian Ownby 79'; Lasso 82' (o.g.); Ballard (yellow card) 90'	Stadium: MUSC Health Stadium; Attendance: 3,710; Referee: Jon Freemon

June 7 10	Louisville City FC	1–0	Charlotte Independence	Louisville, Kentucky
7:30PM	DelPiccolo (yellow card) 11'; Ballard 57'; Smith (yellow card) 74'; Jimenez (yellow card) 86'; Ranjitsingh (yellow card) 90+3'	Report	Ross (yellow card) 9'; Fairclough (yellow card) 20' (yellow-red card) 48'; Ekra (yellow card) 42'; Siaj (yellow card) 90'	Stadium: Louisville Slugger Field; Attendance: 7,403; Referee: Rosendo Mendoza

June 11 11	New York Red Bulls II	0–3	Louisville City FC	Montclair, New Jersey
4:00PM	Najem (yellow card) 66'	Report	Smith 25'; Ownby 55'; Lancaster (yellow card) 90+1'; Ballard 90+3'	Stadium: Montclair State University; Attendance: 581; Referee: Guido Gonzalez Jr.

June 17 12	Louisville City FC	3–0	Pittsburgh Riverhounds	Louisville, Kentucky
7:30PM	Lancaster 8', 64'; Davis IV (yellow card) 35'; McCabe 78'	Report	Jack (yellow card) 36'; Taylor Washington (yellow card) 71'	Stadium: Louisville Slugger Field; Attendance: 8,741; Referee: Bardhyl Pashaj

June 24 13	Harrisburg City Islanders	1–0	Louisville City FC	Harrisburg, Pennsylvania
7:00PM	Ribeiro (penalty missed) 7' 53' (yellow card) 56'; Dabo (yellow card) 24'; Calvano (yellow card) 41'; Thomas (yellow card) 69'	Report		Stadium: FNB Field; Attendance: 2,678; Referee: Gustavo Solorio

July 1 14	Louisville City FC	2–1	Ottawa Fury FC	Louisville, Kentucky
7:30PM	Ownby 14'; Ilic (yellow card) 31'; DelPiccolo (yellow card) 53'; Spencer 71'	Report	Dixon (yellow card) 39'; Barden (yellow card) 56'; Campbell (yellow card) 59'; Dos Santos 87' (yellow card) 90+4'	Stadium: Louisville Slugger Field; Attendance: 7,814; Referee: Henrik Karlsson

July 9 15	Charleston Battery	1–1	Louisville City FC	Charleston, South Carolina
7:00PM	Portillo 23' (pen.); Higashi (yellow card) 52'; Woodbine (yellow card) 69'; Anunga (yellow card) 86'	Report	Smith (yellow card) 23'; Ilic 27'; Morad (yellow card) 71'; Craig (yellow card) 85'	Stadium: MUSC Health Stadium; Attendance: 3,701; Referee: Rubiel Vazquez

July 15 16	Louisville City FC	2–3	FC Cincinnati	Louisville, Kentucky
7:30PM	Ilić 8' (pen.); Smith (yellow card) 27'; Davis (yellow card) 36'; DelPiccolo (yellow card) 78'; Wiedeman 90+3' (o.g.)	Report	Fall 16'; Bone (yellow card) 52'; Delbridge 55'; König 77'	Stadium: Louisville Slugger Field; Attendance: 11,632; Referee: (United States) Marcos de Oliveira

July 22 17	Saint Louis FC	1–4	Louisville City FC	Fenton, Missouri
7:30PM	Bjurman (yellow card) 31'; Jackson 42'; Volesky (red card) 48'; David (yellow card) 54'; Petosevic (yellow card) 59'	Report	Kaye (yellow card) 28'; Jimenez (yellow card) 37' (goal) 52'; Craig 57'; Spencer 82'; Lancaster 86'	Stadium: World Wide Technology Soccer Park; Attendance: 4,310; Referee: Henrik Karlsson

July 29 18	Louisville City FC	2–1	New York Red Bulls II	Louisville, Kentucky
7:30PM	Craig 39'; Spencer 70'	Report	Valot (yellow card) 26'; Tinari (yellow card) 26'; Powder (yellow card) 45+1'; Bonomo 58'; Schmoll (yellow card) 90+3'	Stadium: Louisville Slugger Field; Attendance: 10,017; Referee: Lukasz Szpala

August 5 19	Charlotte Independence	3–1	Louisville City FC	Matthews, North Carolina
7:00PM	Martinez 11', 44', 88' (yellow card) 1' (yellow-red card) 80'; Kalungi (yellow card) 65'; Martinez (yellow card) 68'	Report	Kaye 48' (yellow card) 90+2'; Smith (yellow card) 40'; DelPiccolo (yellow card) 68'; Williams (yellow card) 68'; Craig (yellow card) 75'	Stadium: Sportsplex at Matthews; Attendance: 2,648; Referee: Christopher Spivey

August 12 20	Louisville City FC	5–0	FC Cincinnati	Louisville, Kentucky
7:30PM	McCabe 16'; Spencer 45+2'; Kaye 57'; Ballard 72'; Reynolds 83'	Report	Schindler (yellow card) 13'; de Wit (red card) 36'; Walker (yellow card) 76'	Stadium: Louisville Slugger Field; Attendance: 13,812; Referee: Charles Murphy

August 20 21	Bethlehem Steel FC	1–3	Louisville City FC	Bethlehem, Pennsylvania
5:00PM	Marquez 41'; Fontana (yellow card) 60'; Samuel (yellow card) 90+4'	Report	Spencer 17', 26'; Abend (yellow card) 64'; Lancaster 84'; Smith (red card) 90+4'	Stadium: Goodman Stadium; Attendance: 3,147; Referee: Luis Arroyo

August 23 22	Louisville City FC	5–0	Harrisburg City Islanders	Louisville, Kentucky
7:30PM	Kaye 11'; Ilic 13'; DelPiccolo 27'; McCabe 67'; Totsch 90+1'	Report	Mensah (yellow card) 29'; McLaws (yellow card) 56'; Calvano (yellow card) 75'	Stadium: Louisville Slugger Field; Attendance: 6,763; Referee: Aaron Hernandez

August 26 23	Louisville City FC	0–3	Orlando City B	Louisville, Kentucky
7:30PM	Reynolds (yellow card) 14'; Davis IV (yellow card) 73'; Jimenez (yellow card) 89'	Report	Cox 15', 27'; Timbó 53' (yellow card) 81'; Neal (yellow card) 90'	Stadium: Louisville Slugger Field; Attendance: 8,251; Referee: Calin Radosav

September 2 24	Louisville City FC	1–0	Charleston Battery	Louisville, Kentucky
5:00PM	Abend 78'	Report	Hackshaw (yellow card) 76'; Mueller (yellow card) 79'; Portillo (yellow card) 86'	Stadium: Louisville Slugger Field; Attendance: 7,612; Referee: Malik Badawi

September 9 25	Pittsburgh Riverhounds	0–3	Louisville City FC	Pittsburgh, Pennsylvania
7:00PM	Souto (yellow card) 51'	Report	Spencer 33'; Smith 43'; Williams 54' (pen.)	Stadium: Highmark Stadium; Attendance: 1,936; Referee: Jorge Ramírez

September 15 26	Louisville City FC	2–2	Bethlehem Steel FC	Louisville, Kentucky
7:30PM	Craig (yellow card) 46'; Smith 55' (pen.); Jimenez 76' (yellow card) 86'	Report	Burke 21' (pen.) (yellow card) 31'; Moar 60'; Chambers (yellow card) 70'; Real (yellow card) 88'; Najem (yellow card) 90'	Stadium: Louisville Slugger Field; Attendance: 8,303; Referee: Lorant Varga

September 20 27	Louisville City FC	2–1	Rochester Rhinos	Louisville, Kentucky
7:30PM	Davis IV 23'; Spencer 90+5' (pen.)	Report	Graf 43' (yellow card) 73'; Lee (yellow card) 45'; James (yellow card) 61'; Gomez (yellow card) 88'; Felix (yellow card) 90+4'	Stadium: Louisville Slugger Field; Attendance: 6,698; Referee: Jon Freemon

September 24 28	Ottawa Fury	1–1	Louisville City FC	Ottawa, Canada
2:00PM	DePuy 68'; Bruna (yellow card) 82'	Report	Williams 56'	Stadium: TD Place Stadium; Attendance: 6,015; Referee: Pierre-Luc Lauziere

September 27 29	Toronto FC II	1–0	Louisville City FC	Toronto, Ontario, Canada
7:30PM	Fraser (yellow card) 45'; Hundal 73'	Report	Craig (yellow card) 86' (yellow-red card) 90'	Stadium: Ontario Soccer Centre; Attendance: 726; Referee: Yusri Rudolf

September 30 30	Rochester Rhinos	0–0	Louisville City FC	Rochester, New York
6:05PM	Forbes (yellow card) 71'; Felix (yellow card) 85'	Report	Ownby (yellow card) 67'; Morad (yellow card) 90+3'	Stadium: Capelli Sport Stadium; Referee: Eric Tattersall

October 7 31	Louisville City FC	2–1	Charlotte Independence	Louisville, Kentucky
7:30PM	Abend (yellow card) 19'; Totsch (yellow card) 23'; Smith (yellow card) 29' (goal) 77'; Davis IV (yellow card) 37' (goal) 61'; Craig (yellow card) 51'; Ownby (yellow card) 90+2'	Report	Siaj (yellow card) 23'; Hilton (yellow card) 42'; Calvert 66'; Spies (yellow card) 82'	Stadium: Louisville Slugger Field; Attendance: 7,357; Referee: Lukasz Szpala

October 14 32	Louisville City FC	3–1	Richmond Kickers	Louisville, Kentucky
7:30PM	Morad (penalty missed) 32' 33'; Davis IV (yellow card) 38'; Lancaster 84'; Kaye 86'	Report	Minutillo (yellow card) 34'; Umar (yellow card) 40'; Roberts 45'; Nascimento (red card) 68'	Stadium: Louisville Slugger Field; Attendance: 9,104; Referee: Joshua Brooks

==== USL Playoffs ====
Conference Quarterfinals
October 20 – Louisville Slugger Field
#1 Louisville City FC	4
#8 Bethlehem Steel FC	0
October 21 – Capelli Sport Stadium
#4 Rochester Rhinos (a.e.t.)	2
#5 Charlotte Independence	1
October 21 – Al Lang Stadium
#3 Tampa Bay Rowdies	3
#6 FC Cincinnati	0
October 21 – MUSC Health Stadium
#2 Charleston Battery	0
#7 New York Red Bulls II	4
October 20 – Rio Tinto Stadium
#1 Real Monarchs	1 (1)
#8 Sacramento Republic FC (p)	1 (3)
October 21 – Swope Soccer Village
#4 Swope Park Rangers (p)	1 (4)
#5 Phoenix Rising FC	1 (2)
October 21 – Greater Nevada Field
#3 Reno 1868 FC	0
#6 OKC Energy FC	1
October 21 – Toyota Field
#2 San Antonio FC	2
#7 Tulsa Roughnecks	1

Conference Semifinals
October 28 – Louisville Slugger Field
#1 Louisville City FC	1
#4 Rochester Rhinos	0
October 28 – Al Lang Stadium
#3 Tampa Bay Rowdies	1
#7 New York Red Bulls II (a.e.t.)	2
October 28 – Children's Mercy Park
#8 Sacramento Republic FC	0
#4 Swope Park Rangers	1
October 28 – Toyota Field
#6 OKC Energy FC (p)	1 (4)
#2 San Antonio FC	1 (1)

Conference Finals
November 4 – Louisville Slugger Field
#1 Louisville City FC (p)	1 (4)
#7 New York Red Bulls II	1 (3)
November 4 – Children's Mercy Park
#4 Swope Park Rangers (p)	0 (7)
#6 OKC Energy FC	0 (6)

USL Championship
November 13 – Louisville Slugger Field (ESPNU)
#1 Louisville City FC	1
#4 Swope Park Rangers	0

==== Results ====
October 20, 2017 First round	Louisville City FC	4–0	Bethlehem Steel FC	Louisville, Kentucky
7:30 pm EDT	Morad 14', 31'; Spencer 70'; Ownby 79'	Report	Real (yellow card) 57'; Burke (yellow card) 63'; Conneh (yellow card) 75'; Jones (yellow card) 87'	Stadium: Louisville Slugger Field; Attendance: 6,378; Referee: Marcos de Oliveira

October 28, 2017 Conference Semi-finals	Louisville City FC	1–0	Rochester Rhinos	Louisville, Kentucky
7:30 pm EDT	Jimenez (yellow card) 52'; Ownby 77'; Ranjitsingh (yellow card) 90+1'	Report	Felix (yellow card) 55'	Stadium: Louisville Slugger Field; Attendance: 7,117; Referee: Victor Rivas

November 4, 2017 Conference finals	Louisville City FC	1–1 (a.e.t.) (4–3 p)	New York Red Bulls II	Louisville, Kentucky
7:30 pm EDT	Ownby 12'; Craig (yellow card) 96'	Report	Flemmings 57'	Stadium: Louisville Slugger Field; Attendance: 10,047; Referee: Sorin Stoica
	Penalties
	Smith (penalty scored); DelPiccolo (penalty missed); Totsch (penalty scored); Jimenez (penalty scored); Ballard (penalty scored)		(penalty scored) Bonomo; (penalty scored) Martínez; (penalty scored) Valot; (penalty missed) Mines; (penalty missed) Kutler

November 13, 2017 Championship	Louisville City FC	1–0	Swope Park Rangers	Louisville, Kentucky
9:00 PM EST	Lancaster 88'; Kaye (yellow card) 90+3'; McCabe (red card) 90+8'	Report; Report	Musa (yellow card) 17'; Didic (yellow card) 24'	Stadium: Louisville Slugger Field; Attendance: 14,456; Referee: Jose Carlos Rivero
Note: Niall McCabe was sent off from the bench

=== U.S. Open Cup ===
Louisville City entered the 2017 U.S. Open Cup with the rest of the United Soccer League in the second round.

May 17 R2	Tartan Devils Oak Avalon (Pennsylvania)	0–9	(Kentucky) Louisville City FC	Pittsburgh, Pennsylvania
	Derek Mackenzie (yellow card) 15'; Andrew Kalas (yellow card) 61'	Report	Varga 8' (o.g.); Kaye 16'; Ballard 22'; Lancaster 54', 81'; Ilić 41'; Totsch 68'; Jimenez 77'; Abend 85'	Stadium: Highmark Stadium; Attendance: 400; Referee: Jaroslaw Werel

May 31 R3	FC Cincinnati (Ohio)	1–0	(Kentucky) Louisville City FC	Cincinnati, Ohio
	Delbridge (yellow card) 27'; Fall (yellow card) 38' (goal) 48'; Polak (yellow card) 90'	Report	Smith (yellow card) 42'; Abend (yellow card) 60'; Craig (yellow card) 90+2'	Stadium: Nippert Stadium; Attendance: 6,519; Referee: Brandon Artis

== Player statistics ==
=== Top scorers ===
Place	Position	Number	Name	USL	U.S. Open Cup	USL Cup	Total
1	FW	12	(United States) Luke Spencer	10	0	1	11
2	FW	9	(England) Cameron Lancaster	7	2	1	10
3	MF	22	(United States) George Davis IV	7	0	0	7
3	MF	10	(United States) Brian Ownby	4	0	3	7
5	MF	12	(United States) Oscar Jimenez	4	1	0	5
5	MF	7	(Canada) Mark-Anthony Kaye	4	1	0	5
7	MF	24	(United States) Kyle Smith	4	0	0	4
7	MF	23	(United States) Richard Ballard	3	1	0	4
7	FW	14	(Serbia) Ilija Ilic	3	1	0	4
10	MF	11	(Republic of Ireland) Niall McCabe	3	0	0	3
10	DF	6	(United States) Tarek Morad	1	0	2	3
12	DF	4	(United States) Sean Totsch	1	1	0	2
12	MF	8	(Israel) Guy Abend	1	1	0	2
12	DF	18	(England) Paco Craig	2	0	0	2
12	MF	80	(Jamaica) Speedy Williams	2	0	0	2
16	DF	15	(United States) Sean Reynolds	1	0	0	1
16	MF	36	(United States) Paolo DelPiccolo	1	0	0	1
Total				58	8	7	73

=== Assist leaders ===
Place	Position	Number	Name	USL	U.S. Open Cup	USL Cup	Total
1	MF	19	(United States) Oscar Jimenez	5	1	1	7
2	MF	23	(United States) Richard Ballard	4	1	0	5
2	MF	11	(Republic of Ireland) Niall McCabe	4	1	0	5
2	FW	12	(United States) Luke Spencer	3	0	2	5
4	MF	36	(United States) Paolo DelPiccolo	4	0	0	4
4	MF	10	(United States) Brian Ownby	4	0	0	4
4	FW	14	(Serbia) Ilija Ilic	3	1	0	4
8	DF	24	(United States) Kyle Smith	2	0	1	3
8	FW	9	(England) Cameron Lancaster	2	1	0	3
10	FW	22	(United States) George Davis IV	2	0	0	2
10	DF	18	(England) Paco Craig	1	0	1	2
10	DF	4	(United States) Sean Totsch	1	1	0	2
10	MF	80	(Jamaica) Speedy Williams	1	0	1	2
14	DF	6	(United States) Tarek Morad	1	0	0	1
14	MF	7	(Canada) Mark-Anthony Kaye	1	0	0	1
14	MF	8	(Israel) Guy Abend	0	1	0	1
Total				38	7	5	50

=== Clean sheets ===
Place	Position	Number	Name	USL	U.S. Open Cup	USL Cup	Total
1	GK	1	(Trinidad and Tobago) Greg Ranjitsingh	8	0	3	11
2	GK	28	(United States) Tim Dobrowolski	3	1	0	4
Total				11	1	3	15

=== Disciplinary ===
No.	Pos.	Name	USL		U.S. Open Cup		USL Cup		Total	
No.	Pos.	Name	Yellow card	Red card	Yellow card	Red card	Yellow card	Red card	Yellow card	Red card
12	FW	(United States) Luke Spencer	3	0	0	0	0	0	3	0
36	MF	(United States) Paolo DelPiccolo	6	1	0	0	0	0	6	1
22	MF	(United States) George Davis IV	7	0	0	0	0	0	7	0
18	DF	(England) Paco Craig	8	1	1	0	1	0	10	1
24	DF	(United States) Kyle Smith	7	1	1	0	0	0	8	1
23	MF	(United States) Richard Ballard	2	0	0	0	0	0	2	0
4	DF	(United States) Sean Totsch	2	0	0	0	0	0	2	0
7	MF	(Canada) Mark-Anthony Kaye	3	0	0	0	1	0	4	0
9	MF	(England) Cameron Lancaster	1	0	0	0	0	0	1	0
1	MF	(Trinidad and Tobago) Greg Ranjitsingh	1	0	0	0	1	0	2	0
19	MF	(United States) Oscar Jimenez	4	0	0	0	1	0	5	0
14	FW	(Serbia) Ilija Ilic	1	0	0	0	0	0	1	0
6	DF	(United States) Tarek Morad	2	0	0	0	0	0	2	0
80	MF	(Jamaica) Speedy Williams	1	0	0	0	0	0	1	0
8	MF	(Israel) Guy Abend	2	0	1	0	0	0	3	0
15	DF	(United States) Sean Reynolds	1	0	0	0	0	0	1	0
10	MF	(United States) Brian Ownby	2	0	0	0	0	0	2	0
11	MF	(Republic of Ireland) Niall McCabe	0	0	0	0	0	1	0	1
Total			53	3	3	0	4	0	60	4
