= 2016 Louisville City FC season =

Louisville City
2016 season
- Owner: Wayne Estopinal
- Manager: James O'Connor
- Stadium: Louisville Slugger Field
- USL: 2nd, Eastern
- USL playoffs: Conference finals
- U.S. Open Cup: 3rd Round
- Top goalscorer: League: Chandler Hoffman (14); All: Chandler Hoffman (16)
- Highest home attendance: 10,062 (Jun 25 vs. Cincinnati)
- Lowest home attendance: 5,298 (Apr 2 vs. Orlando)
- Average home league attendance: 7,218

The 2016 Louisville City FC season was the club's second season playing in Louisville, Kentucky, in the United Soccer League (USL), in the third tier of the United States soccer league system.

== Background ==
The club was formed in 2014 when its United Soccer League license was acquired from Orlando City by minority owner Wayne Estopinal. Louisville City is treated as a unique and new team, with the previous team's history claimed by its Major League Soccer successor, Orlando City SC.

== Squad information ==
As of October 1, 2016

No.	Position	Nation	Player
2	DF	USA	Ben Newnam
4	MF	USA	Aodhan Quinn
6	DF	USA	Tarek Morad
7	MF	USA	Kadeem Dacres
8	MF	ISR	Guy Abend
9	FW	ENG	Cameron Lancaster
10	FW	DEN	Magnus Rasmussen
11	MF	IRL	Niall McCabe
12	MF	CAN	Mark-Anthony Kaye
13	GK	TRI	Greg Ranjitsingh
14	FW	SRB	Ilija Ilic
15	DF	USA	Sean Reynolds
17	FW	USA	Chandler Hoffman
18	DF	ENG	Paco Craig
19	DF	KOR	Jonghyun Son
20	DF	USA	Enrique Montano
22	MF	USA	George Davis IV
24	MF	USA	Kyle Smith
28	GK	USA	Tim Dobrowolski
31	FW	HAI	Kenny Doublette
36	MF	USA	Paolo DelPiccolo
77	DF	USA	Andrew Lubahn

== Competitions ==
=== Friendlies ===
March 5, 2016 Preseason	Louisville City	4–0	SIUE Cougars	Louisville, Kentucky
7:45pm EST				Stadium: Louisville Slugger Field

March 10, 2016 Preseason	Louisville Cardinals	0–1	Louisville City	Louisville, Kentucky
7:30pm EST	Dacres 79'	Report		Stadium: Cardinal Park; Attendance: 1,168

March 16, 2016 Preseason	Kentucky Wildcats	0–3	Louisville City	Lexington, Kentucky
3:00pm EDT				Stadium: Lafayette High School

March 19, 2016 Friendly	Louisville City	1–0	Indy Eleven	Louisville, Kentucky
2:00pm EDT	Lubahn 71'	Report		Stadium: Louisville Slugger Field; Attendance: Closed

=== United Soccer League ===
All times in regular season on Eastern Daylight Time (UTC-04:00)

==== Results summary ====
Overall								Home						Away					
Pld	W	D	L	GF	GA	GD	Pts	W	D	L	GF	GA	GD	W	D	L	GF	GA	GD
30	17	9	4	52	27	+25	60	6	7	2	24	14	+10	11	2	2	28	13	+15

Source: Match reports

Round	1	2	3	4	5	6	7	8	9	10	11	12	13	14	15	16	17	18	19	20	21	22	23	24	25	26	27	28	29	30
Stadium	A	H	H	A	A	H	A	A	H	A	A	A	H	A	H	H	H	H	A	A	H	A	H	H	A	H	A	H	A	H
Result	W	L	W	W	W	D	D	W	W	D	W	W	D	W	W	D	W	D	W	L	L	W	D	D	L	W	W	W	W	D

Source: Match reports
A = Away; H = Home; W = Win; D = Draw; L = Loss

==== Results ====
March 26, 2016 1	Charlotte Independence	0–1	Louisville City FC	Charlotte, North Carolina
7:00pm	Metcalf (yellow card); Herrera (yellow card); Duckett (yellow card); Martínez (yellow card)	Report	Lancaster 90+4'; Shanosky (yellow card); Kaye (yellow card)	Stadium: Ramblewood Soccer Complex; Attendance: 1,724; Referee: Marcos Deoliveira

April 2, 2016 2	Louisville City FC	0–2	New York Red Bulls II	Louisville, Kentucky
3:00pm	Davis IV (yellow card) 45'; Del Piccolo (yellow card) 60'; Lancaster (yellow card) 90+1'	Report	Powder (yellow card) 11'; Flemmings 28'; Allen 79'	Stadium: Louisville Slugger Field; Attendance: 7,522; Referee: Sorin Stoica

April 2, 2016 3	Louisville City FC	4–1	Orlando City B	Louisville, Kentucky
7:30pm	Hoffman 25'; Reynolds (yellow card) 36'; Lubahn 47'; Quinn (yellow card) 59'; Dacres 65' (yellow card) 74'; Ilic 90+1'	Report	Cox 5'; Mendoza (yellow card) 23'	Stadium: Louisville Slugger Field; Attendance: 5,298; Referee: Joshua Brooks

April 16, 2016 4	FC Cincinnati	2–3	Louisville City FC	Cincinnati, Ohio
7:00pm	Berry 6'; Okoli (yellow card) 10'; Delbridge (yellow card) 32'; McMahon 90+3'	Report	Hoffman 17', 24', 35'; Reynolds (yellow card) 28' (yellow-red card) 41'; Montano (yellow card)	Stadium: Nippert Stadium; Attendance: 20,497; Referee: Brandon Artis

April 22, 2016 5	Harrisburg City Islanders	2–3	Louisville City FC	Harrisburg, Pennsylvania
7:30pm	Foster (yellow card) 57'; Wilson 45+1'; Jankouskas 86'	Report	Hoffman 21' (pen.), 44'; Abend (yellow card) 62'; Lancaster (yellow card) 78'; Kaye (yellow card) 79' (goal) 89'	Stadium: FNB Field; Attendance: 2,316; Referee: Corson Fidler

April 27, 2016 6	Louisville City FC	2–2	Pittsburgh Riverhounds	Louisville, Kentucky
7:30pm	Hoffman 55'; Newnam (yellow card) 73'; Goodwin (red card) 73'; Shanosky 86'	Report	Parkes 9'; Branson (yellow card) 23'; Hertzog 74' (pen.); Murrell (yellow card) 83'	Stadium: Louisville Slugger Field; Attendance: 5,751; Referee: Marcos Deoliveira

May 1, 2016 7	Bethlehem Steel FC	0–0	Louisville City FC	Bethlehem, Pennsylvania
3:00pm	Conceição (yellow card) 22'; Jones (yellow card) 45'; Chambers (yellow card) 90+1'	Report	Quinn (yellow card) 12'; Smith (yellow card) 64'; Davis IV (yellow card) 80'	Stadium: Goodman Stadium; Attendance: 2,018; Referee: Rosario Candela

May 4, 2016 8	Toronto FC II	0–2	Louisville City FC	Vaughan, Ontario
7:30pm	Edwards (yellow card) 69'; Bloom (yellow card) 86'	Report	Shanosky 5'; McCabe 65'; Kaye (yellow card) 66'	Stadium: Ontario Soccer Centre; Attendance: 672; Referee: Alexis Vaughan

May 14, 2016 9	Louisville City FC	2–0	Saint Louis FC	Louisville, Kentucky
7:30pm	Davis 76'; Lancaster 88' (pen.)	Report	Conner (yellow card) 67'; Pais (yellow card) 89'	Stadium: Louisville Slugger Field; Attendance: 7,859; Referee: Aaron Hernandez

May 21, 2016 10	Richmond Kickers	0–0	Louisville City FC	Richmond, Virginia
7:00pm	Alex Lee (yellow card) 54' (yellow-red card) 63'; Asante (yellow card) 90'	Report	Reynolds (yellow card) 32'; DelPiccolo (yellow card) 55'	Stadium: City Stadium; Attendance: 3,411; Referee: Danielle Chesky

May 28, 2016 11	Charleston Battery	0–2	Louisville City FC	Charleston, South Carolina
7:30pm	Portillo (yellow card) 48'; Williams (red card) 51'	Report	Davis 20'; Smith 38'; Newnam (yellow card) 59'; McCabe (yellow card) 90'	Stadium: MUSC Health Stadium; Referee: Marcos Deoliveira

June 5, 2016 12	Orlando City B	3–4	Louisville City FC	Melbourne, Florida
7:30pm	Heath 29'; Turner (yellow card) 37'; Barry 51'; Laryea (yellow card) 60'; Cox 90+1'	Report	Hoffman 12'; Davis (yellow card) 15' (yellow-red card) 39'; Newman 60'; Lubahn 64'; Quinn 68'; Smith (yellow card) 80'	Stadium: Titan Soccer Complex; Attendance: 781; Referee: Kevin Terry, Jr

June 11, 2016 13	Louisville City FC	2–2	Wilmington Hammerheads FC	Louisville, Kentucky
7:30pm	Hoffman 41', 48'	Report	Parker 17'; Lawal (yellow card) 76'; Fairclough 90+2'	Stadium: Louisville Slugger Field; Attendance: 7,761; Referee: Greg Dopka

June 18, 2016 14	Rochester Rhinos	0–1	Louisville City FC	Rochester, New York
6:00pm	Kamdem (yellow card) 80'	Report	Lubahn 28'; Del Piccolo (yellow card) 45'	Stadium: Rochester Rhinos Stadium; Referee: Patrick Rosas

June 21, 2016 15	Louisville City FC	4–1	Toronto FC II	Louisville, Kentucky
7:30pm	Abend 11', 24'; McCabe 26'; Morad 65'	Report	Daniels (yellow card) 29'; Furlano (yellow card) 64'; Hundal 79'	Stadium: Louisville Slugger Field; Attendance: 7,066; Referee: Rosendo Mendoza

June 25, 2016 16	Louisville City FC	0–0	FC Cincinnati	Louisville, Kentucky
7:50pm	Reynolds (yellow card) 45'	Report	Delbridge (yellow card) 39'; Polak (yellow card) 41'; McMahon (yellow card) 61'	Stadium: Louisville Slugger Field; Attendance: 10,062; Referee: Brandon Artis

July 4, 2016 17	Louisville City FC	2–0	FC Montreal	Louisville, Kentucky
7:30pm	Davis 11'; Hoffman 12'; Quinn (yellow card) 15'	Report	Gagnon-Laparé (red card) 37'	Stadium: Louisville Slugger Field; Attendance: 6,686; Referee: Guido Gonzales Jr.

July 9, 2016 18	Louisville City FC	1–1	Charleston Battery	Louisville, Kentucky
7:30pm	Hoffman 62'; Newnam (yellow card) 69'	Report	Cordovés (yellow card) 59'; Williams (yellow card) 74'; Prince (yellow card) 78'; Tsonis 84'	Stadium: Louisville Slugger Field; Attendance: 7,526; Referee: Michael Lavergne

July 17, 2016 19	Wilmington Hammerheads FC	1–4	Louisville City FC	Wilmington, North Carolina
6:00pm	Perone 88' (pen.)	Report	Abend 12'; Hoffman 64' (pen.), 80'; Quinn 69'	Stadium: Legion Stadium; Attendance: 2,927; Referee: Caleb Mendez

July 23, 2016 20	FC Cincinnati	2–0	Louisville City FC	Cincinnati, Ohio
4:00pm	Wiedeman 39'; Berry (yellow card) 45'; Okoli 59'; Bone (yellow card) 72'	Report	Lubahn (yellow card) 13'; Abend (yellow card) 30'; Quinn (yellow card) 50'	Stadium: Nippert Stadium; Attendance: 20,151; Referee: Alex Chilowicz

July 30, 2016 21	Louisville City FC	1–2	Orlando City B	Louisville, Kentucky
7:30pm	Abend 13'; Reynolds (yellow card) 43'; Davis (yellow card) 72'	Report	Cox (yellow card) 70'; Turner 90+3' (pen.); Smith 90+6' (yellow card) 90+6'	Stadium: Louisville Slugger Field; Attendance: 8,351; Referee: Jon Freemon

August 5, 2016 22	Pittsburgh Riverhounds	1–2	Louisville City FC	Pittsburgh, Pennsylvania
7:00pm	Hertzog 21'; Green (red card) 73'; Moloto (yellow card) 80'	Report	Quinn (yellow card) 21'; Davis IV 56', 81' (yellow card) 84'; Reynolds (yellow card) 75'	Stadium: Highmark Stadium; Attendance: 1,560; Referee: Henrik Karlsson

August 10, 2016 23	Louisville City FC	1–1	Harrisburg City Islanders	Louisville, Kentucky
7:30pm	Smith (yellow card) 30'; Del Piccolo 55'	Report	Barril 20'; Thomas (yellow card) 23'; Dabo (yellow card) 90'; Broome (yellow card) 90'	Stadium: Louisville Slugger Field; Attendance: 5,563; Referee: Georgios Zervos

August 13, 2016 24	Louisville City FC	1–1	Rochester Rhinos	Louisville, Kentucky
7:30pm	Newman (yellow card) 84'; Craig 85'	Report	Volesky 13'; Fall (yellow card) 40'; Apostolopoulos (yellow card) 73'; Farrell (yellow card) 84'	Stadium: Louisville Slugger Field; Attendance: 6,373; Referee: Artur Sibiga

August 19, 2016 25	New York Red Bulls II	1–0	Louisville City FC	Harrison, New Jersey
7:00pm	Powder (yellow card) 63'; Allen 74' (pen.)	Report	Powder (yellow card) 51'; Quinn (yellow card) 90+1'	Stadium: Red Bull Arena; Referee: Hilario Grajeda

August 27, 2016 26	Louisville City FC	1–0	Bethlehem Steel FC	Louisville, Kentucky
7:30pm	Abend 16'; Lancaster (yellow card) 50'; Smith (yellow card) 88'; DelPiccolo (yellow card) 90'	Report	Conceição (yellow card) 15'; Burke (yellow card) 47'; Richter (yellow card) 66'	Stadium: Louisville Slugger Field; Attendance: 6,788; Referee: Tony Crush

September 3, 2016 27	FC Montreal	0–1	Louisville City FC	Montreal, Quebec
3:00pm	Temguia (yellow card) 34'; Riggi (yellow card) 64'	Report	Quinn 49'; Dacres (yellow card) 58'; Lancaster (yellow card) 89'; Lubahn (yellow card) 90+2'	Stadium: Complexe sportif Claude-Robillard

September 10, 2016 28	Louisville City FC	2–0	Richmond Kickers	Louisville, Kentucky
7:30pm	Lancaster 18' (yellow card) 89'; Craig (yellow card) 45'; Rasmussen 50'; Smith (yellow card) 90'	Report	Asante (yellow card) 67'	Stadium: Louisville Slugger Field; Attendance: 7,362; Referee: Brandon Artis

September 17, 2016 29	Saint Louis FC	1–5	Louisville City FC	Fenton, Missouri
8:30pm	Roberts 17'; Dixon (yellow card) 25'; Musa (red card) 35'; Ambersley (yellow card) 69'; David (yellow card) 75'	Report	Dacres 38'; Lancaster 40' (pen.); Rasmussen 51', 56'; Ilic 76'	Stadium: Marshall Wireless Stadium; Referee: Andrew Musashe

September 24, 2016 30	Louisville City FC	1–1	Charlotte Independence	Louisville, Kentucky
7:30pm	Quinn (yellow card) 66'; Kalungi 74' (o.g.)	Report	Davidson (yellow card) 37'; Brown 44'; Martínez (yellow card) 90'	Stadium: Louisville Slugger Field; Attendance: 8,301; Referee: Danielle Chesky

Schedule source

==== Standings ====
Eastern Conference

Pos	Team	Pld	W	D	L	GF	GA	GD	Pts	Qualification
1	New York Red Bulls II (C, X)	30	21	6	3	61	21	+40	69	Conference Playoffs
2	Louisville City FC	30	17	9	4	52	27	+25	60	Conference Playoffs
3	FC Cincinnati	30	16	8	6	41	27	+14	56	Conference Playoffs
4	Rochester Rhinos	30	13	12	5	38	25	+13	51	Conference Playoffs
5	Charlotte Independence	30	14	8	8	48	29	+19	50	Conference Playoffs

Source: 2016 USL Standings
Rules for classification: 1) total wins; 2) total goal differential; 3) total goals scored; 4) points earned against top four Conference finishers; 5) disciplinary points; 6) coin toss or drawing of lots
(C) Champions; (X) Regular Season League Champion

==== USL playoffs ====
First round
October 2 – Red Bull Arena
#1 New York Red Bulls II	4
#8 Orlando City B	0
October 1 – Rochester Rhinos Stadium
#4 Rochester Rhinos	3
#5 Charlotte Independence	1
October 2 – Nippert Stadium
#3 FC Cincinnati	1
#6 Charleston Battery	2
October 2 – Louisville Slugger Field
#2 Louisville City FC (a.e.t.)	2
#7 Richmond Kickers	0
October 1 – Bonney Field
#1 Sacramento Republic FC	0 (4)
#8 Orange County Blues FC (p)	0 (5)
September 30 – Swope Soccer Village
#4 Swope Park Rangers	3
#5 LA Galaxy II	0
September 30 – Switchbacks Stadium
#3 Colorado Springs Switchbacks FC	1
#6 Vancouver Whitecaps FC 2	2
October 1 – H-E-B Park
#2 Rio Grande Valley FC Toros	2
#7 Oklahoma City Energy FC	3

Conference Semifinals
October 7 – Red Bull Arena
#1 New York Red Bulls II (p)	3 (5)
#4 Rochester Rhinos	3 (4)
October 8 – Louisville Slugger Field
#6 Charleston Battery	0
#2 Louisville City FC	1
October 9 – Swope Soccer Village
#8 Orange County Blues FC	1
#4 Swope Park Rangers (a.e.t.)	2
October 8 – Thunderbird Stadium
#6 Vancouver Whitecaps FC 2	3
#7 Oklahoma City Energy FC	2

Conference finals
October 16 - Red Bull Arena
#1 New York Red Bulls II (p)	1 (4)
#2 Louisville City FC	1 (3)
October 15 - Swope Soccer Village
#4 Swope Park Rangers	3
#6 Vancouver Whitecaps FC 2	0

USL Championship
October 23 - Red Bull Arena
#1 New York Red Bulls II	5
#4 Swope Park Rangers	1

==== Results ====
Oct 2, 2016 First round	Louisville City	2 - 0 (a.e.t.)	Richmond Kickers	Louisville, Kentucky
7:00pm EDT	Davis IV 92'; Hoffman 102'	Report	Asante (red card) 6'; Lee (yellow card) 21'; Yeisley (yellow card) 34'; Yomby (yellow card) 40'; Troyer (yellow card) 42'	Stadium: Louisville Slugger Field; Attendance: 5,467; Referee: Andrew Musashe

October 8, 2016 Conference semi-finals	Louisville City	1–0	Charleston Battery	Louisville, Kentucky
7:30 pm	Smith (yellow card) 45+1'; Dacres 53'; Reynolds (yellow card) 90+4'	Report	Tsonis (yellow card) 24'; Marini (yellow card) 62'; Adjetey (yellow card) 67'; Woodbine (red card) 90+4'	Stadium: Louisville Slugger Field; Attendance: 6,581; Referee: Mark Kadlecik

October 16, 2016 Conference finals	New York Red Bulls II	1–1 (a.e.t.) (4–3 p)	Louisville City	Harrison, New Jersey
6:00 PM	Valot 74'; Williams (red card) 118'	USL Report	Craig 11' (yellow card) 102' (red card) 120+'; Reynolds (red card) 104'	Stadium: Red Bull Arena; Attendance: 2,709; Referee: Robert Sibiga
	Penalties
	Etienne (penalty scored); Long (penalty scored); Allen (penalty scored); Bezecourt (penalty scored)		(penalty missed) Lancaster; (penalty scored) Smith; (penalty scored) Quinn; (penalty scored) Kaye; (penalty missed) Newnam

=== U.S. Open Cup ===
Louisville City entered the 2016 U.S. Open Cup with the rest of the United Soccer League in the second round.

May 18, 2016 2R	Louisville City (Kentucky)	1–1 (a.e.t.) (3–1 p)	(Michigan) Detroit City FC	Louisville, Kentucky
7:00pm EDT	Ilić 115' (yellow card) 79'	Report	Harris 104'	Stadium: Owsley B. Frazier Stadium

June 1, 2016 3R	Indy Eleven (Indiana)	2–1	(Kentucky) Louisville City	Indianapolis, Indiana
7:30pm EDT	Gordon 58'; Zayed 68' (yellow card) 81'; Keller (yellow card) 84'		Hoffman 21'; Lancaster (yellow card) 26'	Stadium: Carroll Stadium; Attendance: 2,145; Referee: Brandon Artis

== Player statistics ==
=== Top scorers ===
Place	Position	Number	Name	USL	U.S. Open Cup	USL Cup	Total
1	FW	17	(United States) Chandler Hoffman	14	1	1	16
2	MF	22	(United States) George Davis IV	5	0	1	6
3	MF	8	(Israel) Guy Abend	5	0	0	5
4	FW	9	(England) Cameron Lancaster	4	0	0	4
5	FW	14	(Serbia) Ilija Ilić	2	1	0	3
5	MF	4	(United States) Aodhan Quinn	3	0	0	3
5	MF	13	(United States) Kadeem Dacres	2	0	1	3
5	MF	10	(Denmark) Magnus Rasmussen	3	0	0	3
5	DF	77	(United States) Andrew Lubahn	3	0	0	3
10	MF	11	(Republic of Ireland) Niall McCabe	2	0	0	2
10	DF	5	(England) Paco Craig	1	0	1	2
10	MF	12	(Canada) Mark Anthony Kaye	2	0	0	2
13	MF	36	(United States) Paolo DelPiccolo	1	0	0	1
13	MF	24	(United States) Kyle Smith	1	0	0	1
13	DF	2	(United States) Ben Newnam	1	0	0	1
13	DF	6	(United States) Tarek Morad	1	0	0	1
13	DF	5	(United States) Conor Shanosky	1	0	0	1
Total				51	2	4	57

=== Assist leaders ===
Place	Position	Number	Name	USL	U.S. Open Cup	USL Cup	Total
1	MF	24	(United States) Kyle Smith	6	0	0	6
1	MF	36	(United States) Paolo DelPiccolo	5	1	0	6
3	MF	4	(United States) Aodhan Quinn	3	0	2	5
4	MF	11	(Republic of Ireland) Niall McCabe	4	0	0	4
5	MF	22	(United States) George Davis IV	2	0	1	3
5	FW	9	(England) Cameron Lancaster	3	0	0	3
5	MF	13	(United States) Kadeem Dacres	2	0	1	3
5	DF	2	(United States) Ben Newnam	3	0	0	3
9	MF	12	(Canada) Mark Anthony Kaye	2	0	0	2
9	DF	6	(United States) Tarek Morad	2	0	0	2
10	DF	5	(England) Paco Craig	1	0	0	1
10	MF	8	(Israel) Guy Abend	1	0	0	1
10	DF	77	(United States) Andrew Lubahn	1	0	0	1
10	DF	15	(United States) Sean Reynolds	0	0	1	1
Total				35	2	4	41

=== Clean sheets ===
Place	Position	Number	Name	USL	U.S. Open Cup	USL Cup	Total
1	GK	13	(Trinidad and Tobago) Greg Ranjitsingh	10	0	3	13
2	GK	1	(United States) Scott Goodwin	2	0	0	2
2	GK	28	(United States) Tim Dobrowolski	1	0	0	1
Total				13	0	3	16

=== Disciplinary ===
No.	Pos.	Name	USL		U.S. Open Cup		USL Cup		Total	
No.	Pos.	Name	Booked	Sent off (straight red)	Booked	Sent off (straight red)	Booked	Sent off (straight red)	Booked	Sent off (straight red)
15	DF	(United States) Sean Reynolds	6	1	0	0	2	0	8	1
24	MF	(United States) Kyle Smith	5	0	0	0	1	0	6	0
2	DF	(United States) Ben Newnam	4	0	0	0	0	0	4	0
4	MF	(United States) Aodhan Quinn	6	0	0	0	0	0	6	0
8	MF	(Israel) Guy Abend	3	0	0	0	0	0	3	0
36	MF	(United States) Paolo DelPiccolo	4	0	0	0	0	0	4	0
5	DF	(England) Paco Craig	1	0	0	0	0	1	1	1
13	MF	(United States) Kadeem Dacres	2	0	0	0	0	0	2	0
9	FW	(England) Cameron Lancaster	1	0	0	0	0	0	1	0
12	MF	(Canada) Mark Anthony Kaye	2	0	0	0	0	0	2	0
77	DF	(United States) Andrew Lubahn	2	0	0	0	0	0	2	0
11	MF	(Republic of Ireland) Niall McCabe	1	0	0	0	0	0	1	0
6	DF	(United States) Tarek Morad	1	0	0	0	0	0	1	0
1	GK	(United States) Scott Goodwin	0	1	0	0	0	0	0	1
20	DF	(United States) Enrique Montano	2	0	0	0	0	0	2	0
22	MF	(United States) George Davis IV	4	1	0	0	0	0	4	1
5	DF	(United States) Conor Shanosky	1	0	0	0	0	0	1	0
Total			45	3	0	0	3	1	48	4

== Media ==
As with the rest of the USL, all of Louisville City FC's USL matches will appear on YouTube. There is also a weekly Radio show on 790 WKRD.

== See also ==
- 2016 in American soccer
- 2016 USL season
- Louisville City FC
