= Tri-campus =

Tri-campus refer to a collection of three campuses of a university.

- Campuses of the University of Toronto
- Campuses of the University of Washington
- Campuses of the University of Notre Dame, Saint Mary's College, and Holy Cross College in Notre Dame, Indiana.
