= Jonghyun Son =

Jonghyun Son may refer to:

- Son Jong-hyun, (born 1991) South Korean footballer
- Jonghyun "Johnny" Son, (born 2003) Canadian soccer player
