= Oscar Jimenez (soccer, born 1989) =

American soccer player

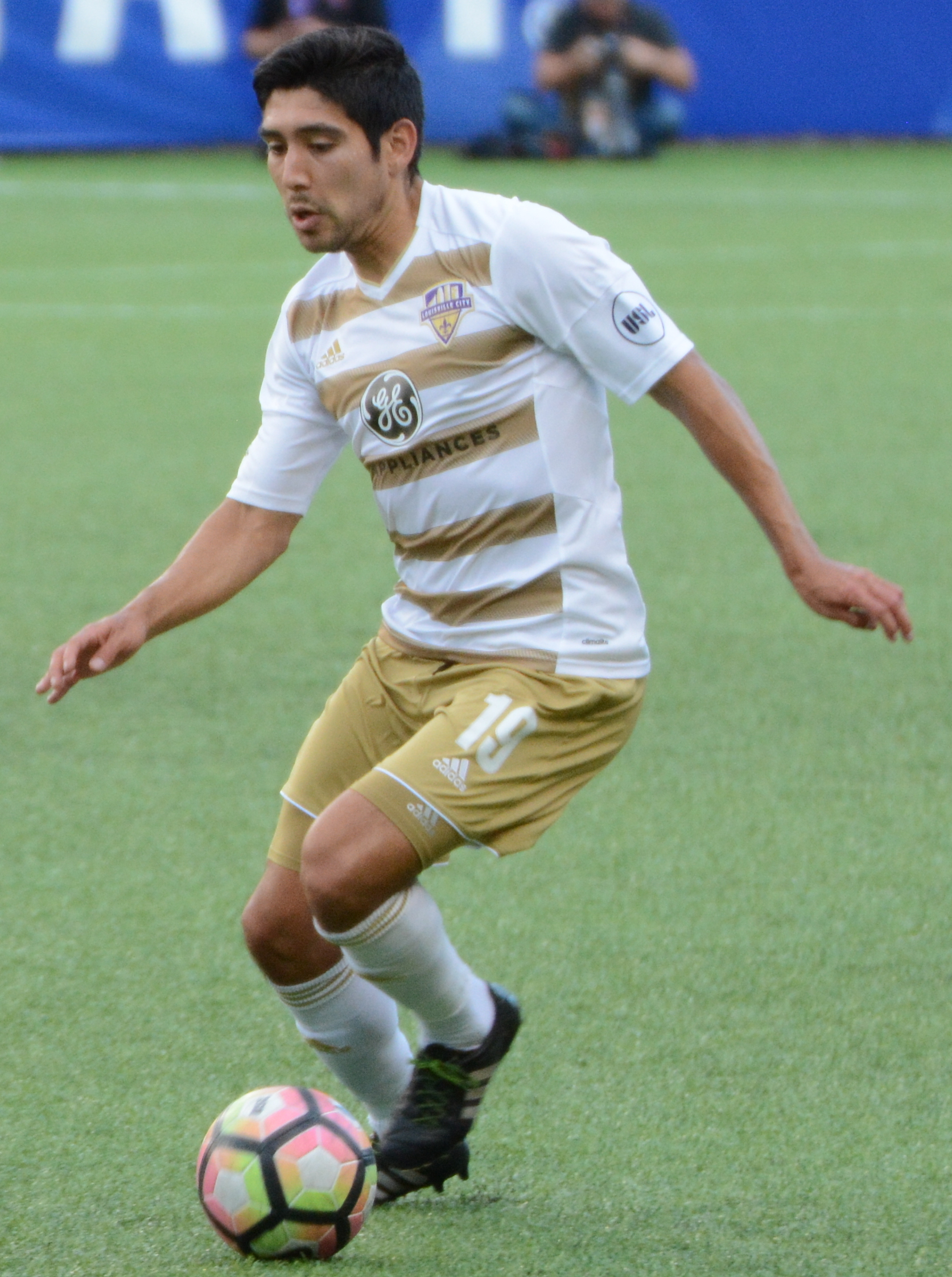
- Jimenez playing for Louisville City in 2017

Personal information
- Date of birth: November 3, 1989 (age 36)
- Place of birth: Mount Vernon, Washington, United States
- Height: 1.72 m (5 ft 8 in)
- Positions: Left-back; midfielder

College career
Years	Team	Apps	(Gls)
2008–2011	Western Washington Vikings		

Senior career*
Years	Team	Apps	(Gls)
2013	Bellingham United		
2014	Seattle Sounders U-23	1	(0)
2015	Tulsa Roughnecks	18	(1)
2016	Mississippi Brilla	14	(4)
2017–2023	Louisville City	169	(7)
2024	Memphis 901	21	(1)
2025	South Georgia Tormenta	29	(0)

Managerial career
- 2013–2014: Western Washington Vikings (volunteer assistant)
- * Club domestic league appearances and goals as of November 1, 2025

Oscar Jimenez (born November 3, 1989) is an American former soccer player.

== Early life ==
=== Personal ===
Jimenez was born in Mount Vernon, Washington, and is of Mexican descent holding dual citizenship. He has a step-father Ramon De Leon, and attended high school at Mount Vernon High School. While at Mount Vernon he played soccer and was a Cross country runner. Jimenez was named thrice Skagit Valley Herald Boys’ Soccer Player of the year and as a senior named Northwest League co-MVP. His senior season as team captain he scored ten goals as Mount Vernon won both league and district titles and reached the quarterfinals of Class 3A state playoffs. Also as a senior he finished 8th as an individual in Northwest District cross country championship.

=== College and youth ===
Jimenez played four years of college soccer at Western Washington University between 2008 and 2011. As a Freshman he appeared in eighteen of the Vikings' nineteen matches scoring five goals with five assists as the Vikings won the GNAC regular season championship for the second time in its history. As a Sophomore he appeared in all 20 of the Vikings' matches scoring six goals with a team leading six assists and was named to both the All GNAC First and West Region All-Star Second teams. As a Junior he again appeared in all of the Viking's eighteen matches while leading the team with seven assists and scoring four goals. After the season he again was named to the All GNAC First team as well as the Daktronics West Region First team. As a Senior he appeared in seventeen of the Viking's eighteen matches while scoring two goals with a team-leading five assists. Being named to the All GNAC Second team after the season. He left WWU as the team's all-time leader in assists as well as being in the top 10 in points, goals, and minutes played.

Jimenez spent the 2013 season with Bellingham United and was named Most Valuable Player. During his time at the club, he also trained with the Seattle Sounders U23s.

During his time at the club, Jimenez took part in a Las Vegas combine in 2013 and Swedish showcase in January 2014, but could not earn a professional deal. He also had an unsuccessful trial with the Wilmington Hammerheads in the 2014 pre-season.

Jimenez made a single appearance for the Seattle Sounders U23s in the Premier Development League.

== Club career ==
=== Tulsa Roughnecks ===
On February 24, 2015, Jimenez signed a professional contract with USL club the Tulsa Roughnecks. He made his professional debut on April 3 in a 2–0 defeat to Saint Louis.

Sitting out of eight weeks of action due to injury, Jimenez made his return with a two-minute cameo appearance in a 5–1 victory at the Seattle Sounders 2 on 5 June.

On July 9, he scored his first professional goal in a 4–1 victory over the Orange County Blues. Two weeks later, he recorded his first professional assist in a 1–1 draw at the Oklahoma City Energy. He also made his final appearance against the Energy on September 6.

=== Mississippi Brilla ===
On May 2, 2016, Jimenez joined the Mississippi Brilla in the Premier Development League.

On June 10, he scored his first goal for the club in a 2–1 victory over Oklahoma City Energy U23s, while assisting his team's second goal.

A week later, he scored his first career brace in a 3–2 win at Saint Louis U23s. He scored his fourth goal of the season on June 25 at the Midland/Odessa Sockers FC to secure a 1–1 draw and finish as his club's joint top scorer for the 2016 season.

=== Louisville City ===
On February 15, 2017, Jimenez was announced as USL club Louisville City's seventh signing of the 2017 season after successful try-outs. He was released by Louisville following the 2023 season.

=== Memphis 901 ===
Jimenez signed a multi-year deal with Memphis 901 on December 14, 2023.

=== South Georgia Tormenta ===
Jimenez joined USL League One side South Georgia Tormenta for their 2025 season.

== Later career ==
Jimenez retired in March 2026 and joined Louisville City FC as the Academy Assistant Director.

== Honors ==
Louisville City FC

- USL Cup: 2017, 2018

Individual

- USL All League First Team: 2019
