= Tarek Morad =

American soccer player (born 1992)

- Morad playing for Louisville City in 2017

Personal information
- Date of birth: August 21, 1992 (age 34)
- Place of birth: Los Angeles, California, United States
- Height: 1.86 m (6 ft 1 in)
- Positions: Center back; defensive midfielder

Youth career
- 2004–2010: Arsenal FC (California)
- 2006–2010: Chino Hills High School
- 2013: Chivas USA

College career
Years	Team	Apps	(Gls)
2010	Mt. SAC	18	(0)
2011–13	UC Irvine	61	(3)

Senior career*
Years	Team	Apps	(Gls)
2014	OKC Energy FC	16	(0)
2015–17	Louisville City FC	72	(4)
2018	Arab Contractors	0	(0)
2018–19	Tampa Bay Rowdies	46	(0)
2020	San Diego Loyal SC	6	(0)
2021–23	Oakland Roots SC	71	(2)
- * Club domestic league appearances and goals

Tarek Morad (Arabic: طارق مراد; born August 21, 1992) is an American professional soccer player who last played for Oakland Roots in the USL Championship.

== Early life ==
=== Personal ===
Tarek was born in Los Angeles, California and raised in Chino Hills, California to Egyptian parents and has two older brothers. He attended Chino Hills High School where he would twice win the Sierra League and be named the Sierra League MVP as a Junior.

=== College and Youth ===
Morad was to originally play college soccer at UC Riverside as a midfielder but his scholarship offer was rescinded. Instead he enrolled at Mt. San Antonio College in 2010. While at Mt. San Antonio he led the Mounties to the South Coast Conference Title as well the California Junior College State Championship. He was also named to the All-Conference team.

In 2011, Morad transferred to UC Irvine where he would be converted to a defender. He would play in 61 matches and score three goals during his time there. During his senior year UC Irvine would win the Big West Conference title, the Big West Tournament title, and would make it to the sweet-16 of the NCAA Tournament; a school record.

In 2013, Morad also played with the Chivas USA U23 team. Chivas would finish the year unbeaten on their way to the Coast Soccer League Championship where Morad would score the final goal of Championship match.

== Club career ==
=== OKC Energy FC ===
==== 2014 season ====
Morad went undrafted in the 2014 MLS SuperDraft and after a month-long trial with Seattle Sounders FC signed with United Soccer League affiliate and expansion side OKC Energy FC on February 27. He would appear in 16 of Oklahoma's 28 regular season matches.

=== Louisville City FC ===
==== 2015 season ====
On February 19 Morad signed with another USL expansion team; Louisville City FC. He made his debut on March 28 against Saint Louis on the season-opener and appear in 26 of Louisville's 28 regular season matches scoring 2 goals. The team's impressive first year in the USL ended with a playoff loss to the Rochester Rhinos in the eastern conference final after finishing 2nd in the league.

==== 2016 season ====
Morad would play in 20 of Louisville's 30 regular season matches and make his season debut on April 2 against Orlando City B. He scored his lone goal on June 21 against Toronto and would also contribute 2 assists. He played in one of Louisville's US Open Cup matches as well as all three of Louisville's USL Cup matches before the team fell to the New York Redbulls II in penalty kicks in the eastern conference final.

==== 2017 season ====
Morad would play in 26 of Louisville's 32 regular season matches and make his season debut on March 25 against Saint Louis. He also played in both of Louisville's US Open Cup matches as well as all four of Louisville's USL Cup matches. He scored his lone goal of the regular season in the final match against Richmond off the rebounded his own missed penalty kick. This goal made him the 17th and final outfield player to score for Louisville during the season; the entire outfield roster. He would also score a brace in the first half of Louisville's opening USL Cup Quarterfinal match against Bethlehem. Morad and Louisville would go on to win the Eastern Conference Final against the former champions, New York Redbulls II, as well as the USL Cup against Swope Park Rangers.

Morad did not re-sign with Louisville after the season. He left Louisville as their all-time leader in both league and overall appearances with 75 and 88 appearances respectively, a regularly featured starter for the champions during his time with the club.

=== Tampa Bay Rowdies ===
==== 2018 season ====
On August 8 Morad signed with the Tampa Bay Rowdies of the USL after leaving his club in Egypt, the Arab Contractors. He made his Tampa debut the next day, helping the Rowdies earn a clean sheet against Charleston. Morad featured in each of the Rowdies final regular season matches where the club coming up short on playoff qualification.

==== 2019 season ====
The 2019 season saw Morad become a crucial player for the Tampa Bay Rowdies, making 34 appearances as his team finished 5th in the Eastern Conference, before losing the Conference Quarter Final 2–1 to his old team Louisville City on October 27, 2019. On November 19, 2019, Morad announced on his Twitter account that he was leaving the Tampa Bay Rowdies.

=== San Diego Loyal SC ===
==== 2020 season ====
After having a trial cut short in early 2020 at Irish Premier League side, St. Patrick's Athletic, due to COVID-19, Morad joined USL Championship side San Diego Loyal on August 28, 2020. Morad featured as a starter in each of Landon Donovan’s side’s remaining matches of the 2020 regular season. With the club poised to make a playoff position on the final match against the league leaders, Phoenix Rising FC, the Loyal forfeited the match at halftime despite leading 3-1 after a San Diego player was called a homophobic slur. Morad did not re-sign with the Loyal after the 2020 season.

=== Oakland Roots ===
On December 21, 2020, it was announced that Morad would join USL Championship side Oakland Roots ahead of their inaugural season in the league. After three seasons with the Roots, he did not re-sign for the 2024 season and announced his retirement before the following season started, transitioning into a Club Ambassador role for the club.

== Career statistics ==
Professional appearances – correct as of Dec 1, 2023.

Club	Season	League			National Cup		Playoffs		Total	
Club	Season	Division	Apps	Goals	Apps	Goals	Apps	Goals	Apps	Goals
Oklahoma City Energy	2014	USL Championship	16	0	1	0	—		17	0
Louisville City	2015	USL Championship	26	2	2	0	2 (Note: Appearances in USL Cup)	0	30	2
Louisville City	2016	USL Championship	20	1	1	0	3	0	24	1
Louisville City	2017	USL Championship	26	1	2	0	4	2	32	3
Tampa Bay Rowdies	2018	USL Championship	13	0	0	0	—		13	0
Tampa Bay Rowdies	2019	USL Championship	33	0	1	0	1	0	35	0
San Diego Loyal	2020	USL Championship	6	0	0	0	—		6	0
Oakland Roots SC	2021-2024	USL Championship	71	2	1	0	3	0	75	2
Career Total			211	6	8	0	13	2	232	8

== Honors ==
Louisville City FC

- USL Cup: 2017
