= Mark-Anthony Kaye =

Canadian soccer player (born 1994)

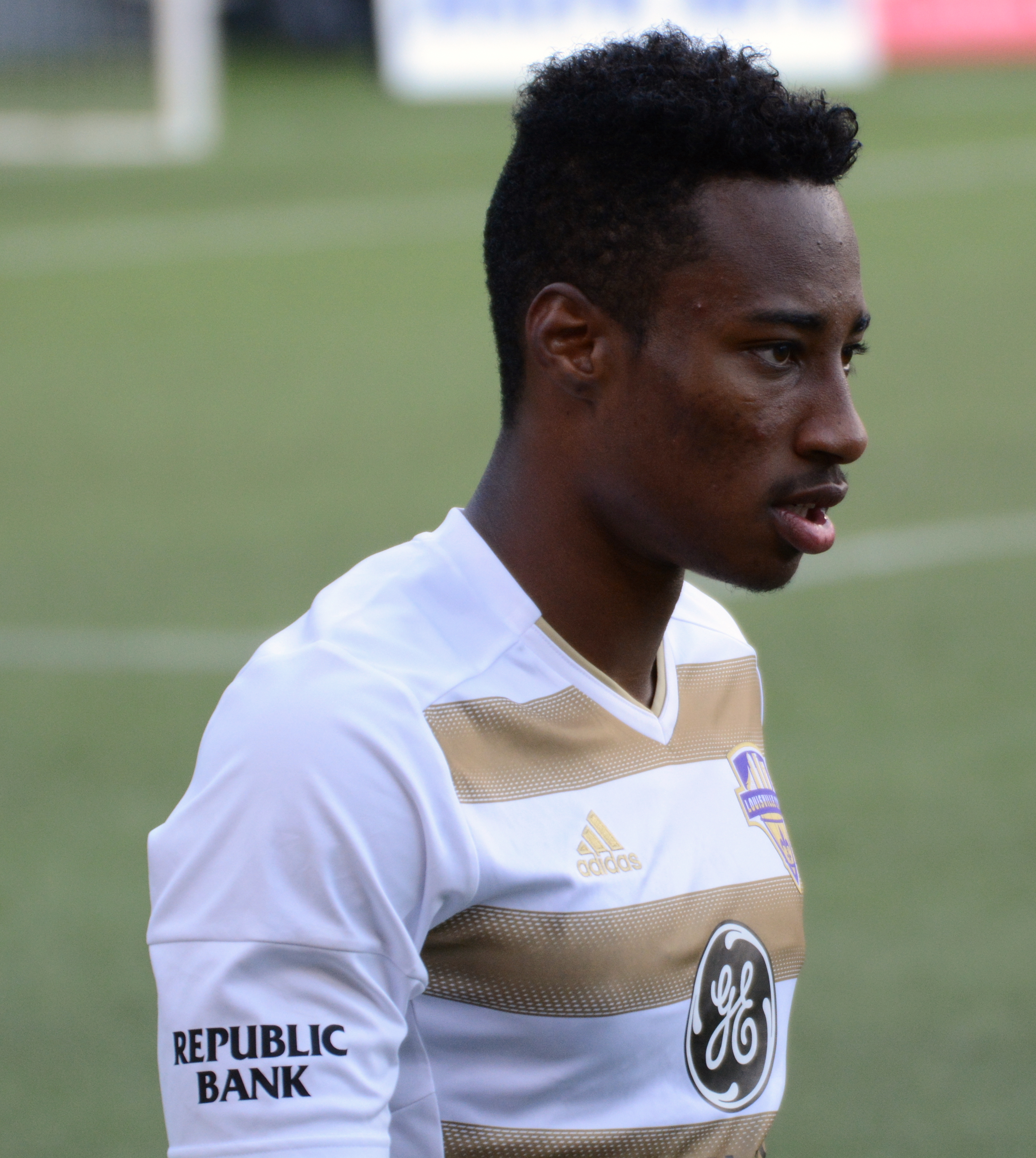
- Kaye with Louisville City in 2017

Personal information
- Full name: Mark-Anthony Kaye
- Date of birth: 2 December 1994 (age 31)
- Place of birth: Toronto, Ontario, Canada
- Height: 1.86 m (6 ft 1 in)
- Position: Midfielder

Team information
- Current team: Sacramento Republic
- Number: 18

Youth career
- Wexford SC
- Ajax SC
- Glen Shields SC
- Bryst FA
- 2013–2014: Toronto FC

College career
Years	Team	Apps	(Gls)
2012–2013	York Lions	29	(18)

Senior career*
Years	Team	Apps	(Gls)
2014	Toronto FC III	9	(1)
2014	→ Wilmington Hammerheads (loan)	7	(2)
2015	Toronto FC II	22	(0)
2016–2017	Louisville City	43	(5)
2018–2021	Los Angeles FC	77	(9)
2021–2022	Colorado Rapids	32	(4)
2022–2023	Toronto FC	29	(2)
2023–2024	New England Revolution	31	(0)
2025	San Jose Earthquakes	27	(1)
2026–	Sacramento Republic	17	(1)

International career^{‡}
2016	Canada U23	4	(0)
2017–2023	Canada	42	(2)
- * Club domestic league appearances and goals as of November 11, 2026 ‡ National team caps and goals as of November 22, 2023

Mark-Anthony Kaye (born 2 December 1994) is a Canadian professional soccer player who plays as a midfielder for USL Championship club Sacramento Republic FC.

== Early life ==
Born in Toronto, Ontario to Jamaican parents, Kaye first began playing soccer with Wexford SC in Scarborough. He later played with Ajax SC, winning a provincial title in 2009, and Glen Shields SC and Bryst FA. He attended Elementary school at John Ross Robinson Public School and High School at Lawrence Park Collegiate Institute where he played soccer, where he was twice named team MVP, as well as participating in cross country, and track and field.

== University career ==
Kaye played two years of university soccer at York University between 2012 and 2013. During his university career he played in 29 matches and scored 18 goals. He was named OUA rookie of the year after his first year season and selected to the CIS all-Canadian second-team and the OUA first-team as a second year. York won the OUA championship during his final season.

== Club career ==
=== Early career ===
Kaye left York and joined TFC Academy, the academy side of Major League Soccer's Toronto FC in 2013. In 2014, he played in League1 Ontario with the senior academy team appearing in nine matches and scoring one goal. Kaye joined the Wilmington Hammerheads of the USL Pro on loan from TFC Academy in August 2014 as part of an affiliation between the two clubs. He made his professional debut on August 23, 2014, in a league match against Orange County Blues FC. The next day, Kaye tallied his first professional goal and assist as Wilmington drew 3–3 with LA Galaxy II. In total, Kaye appeared in 7 matches and tallied 2 goals and 2 assists during his loan with the Hammerheads.

=== Toronto FC II ===
==== 2015 season ====
On March 12, 2015, Kaye and seven other players were signed by USL side Toronto FC II ahead of their inaugural season. He made his debut against the Charleston Battery on March 21 and appeared in 22 matches without a goal.

=== Louisville City ===
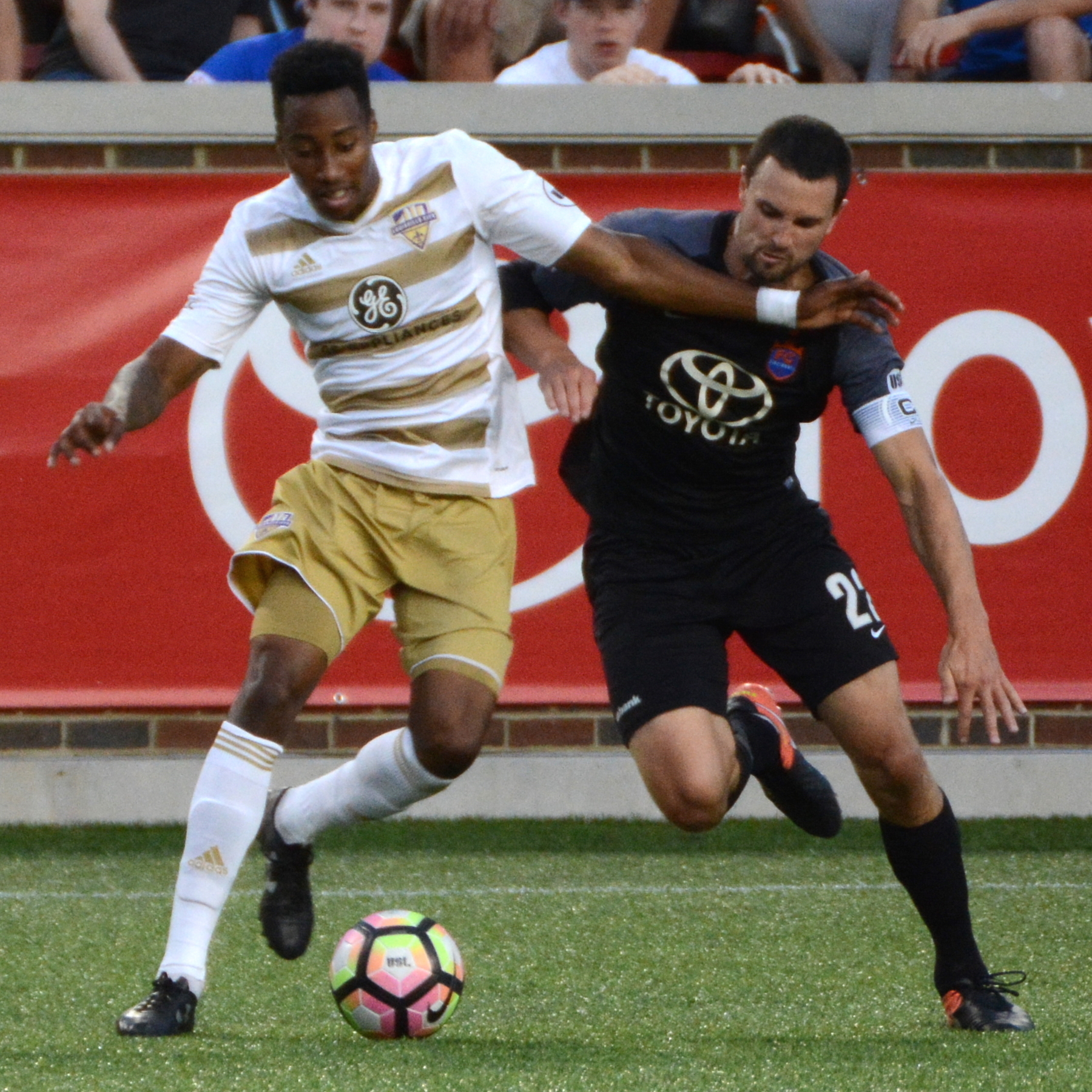
Kaye faces FC Cincinnati defender Austin Berry in 2017

==== 2016 season ====
On January 13, 2016, Kaye signed with USL side Louisville City FC and he made his season debut in the opening match on March 26 against Charlotte. He played in 24 of Louisville's 28 regular season matches, scoring one goal with three assists. He also played in two of Louisville's three USL Cup matches going goalless. He did, however, score in the penalty shootout in the Eastern Conference Finals match against New York Red Bulls II, a match New York eventually won.

==== 2017 season ====
Kaye missed the first two matches of the 2017 season while on international duty and made his season debut on April 8 against Richmond. He played in 19 of Louisville's 32 regular season matches scoring four goals. He also played in both of Louisville's U.S. Open Cup matches; scoring once against the Tartan Devils. In the USL Cup playoffs Kaye started all four matches as he and Louisville won the USL Cup Final against Swope Park.

=== Los Angeles FC ===
After two seasons in Louisville, Kaye was transferred to MLS side Los Angeles FC for their inaugural season. He made his LAFC debut against Seattle Sounders FC during the 2018 season opener. On July 26, 2018, Kaye suffered a fractured foot in the El Tráfico rivalry game against the LA Galaxy, with coach Bob Bradley saying he'd need surgery, with LAFC setting no timetable for his return; NBC Sports reported that the injury would sideline the player for "4–6 months".

=== Colorado Rapids ===
On July 27, 2021, Kaye was traded, alongside a first-round pick in the 2022 MLS SuperDraft to the Colorado Rapids in exchange for $1 million in General Allocation Money and a 2022 international roster slot. He made his debut for the Rapids on August 7 against Sporting Kansas City. On August 21 Kaye scored his first goal for the Rapids, netting the game-winner in a 2–1 comeback win over Rocky Mountain Cup rivals Real Salt Lake. At the end of the season Colorado announced they had exercised Kaye's contract option, keeping him at the club through the 2022 season. Before the start of the 2022 season Colorado announced Kaye signed a 4-year contract extension, through the end of the 2025 season, with an option for 2026.

=== Toronto FC ===
In July 2022, Toronto FC announced they had traded Ralph Priso, General Allocation Money, a first-round pick in the 2023 MLS SuperDraft and an international roster slot for Kaye. The move returned Kaye to Toronto after six years away and also reunited him with his coach at LAFC, Bob Bradley. He made his debut on July 13, starting against the Chicago Fire and going 63 minutes in a 2–0 defeat. Kaye scored his first goal for Toronto FC in their first match of the 2023 season, netting Toronto's second goal in an eventual 3–2 defeat to D.C. United on February 25, 2023.

=== New England Revolution ===
On July 13, 2023, Kaye was traded to the New England Revolution in return for Latif Blessing and a 2023 international roster slot. He scored his first goal for the club on February 29, 2024, in the Revolution's 3–0 win over C.A. Independiente de La Chorrera in the CONCACAF Champions Cup.

=== San Jose Earthquakes ===
Kaye, along with teammates Dave Romney and Ian Harkes, were traded to the San Jose Earthquakes on December 2, 2024, for "around" $500,000 General allocation money and an international roster spot, reuniting Kaye with his former Revolution manager Bruce Arena.

=== Sacramento Republic FC ===
On February 20, 2026 Sacramento Republic FC announced they had signed Kaye to a contract ahead of the USL Championship season.

== International career ==
=== Youth ===
In May 2016, Kaye was called to Canada's U23 national team for a pair of friendlies against Guyana and Grenada. He saw action in both matches. In March 2017 Kaye was called up again to the U23 side for the Aspire Tournament which also featured the hosts Qatar and Uzbekistan.

=== Senior ===
Kaye made his debut for the senior team against Curaçao in a friendly on June 13, 2017. On June 27, he was named to Canada's squad for the 2017 CONCACAF Gold Cup. He was named to the squad for the 2019 CONCACAF Gold Cup on May 20, 2019. Kaye scored his first goals for Canada on March 29, 2021, netting a brace in a 11–0 victory over the Cayman Islands. In July 2021 Kaye joined Canada for his third Gold Cup tournament, being named to the squad for the 2021 edition of the competition.

In November 2022, Kaye was called up to Canada's squad for the 2022 FIFA World Cup.

== Style of play ==
During his time at Louisville, Kaye played as an "attacking midfielder and winger", however following his ascension into MLS, he assumed a "box-to-box central midfield role, one that he's thriving in"; he also performed this role on international duty with Canada. LAFC coach Bob Bradley said of Kaye: "He brings a little bit more range, a little bit more ability to get around the ball, a little bit of an ability to close down, win some balls in air, get into the box in both sides. All those things make him a little bit different".

== Career statistics ==
=== Club ===
As of match played May 23, 2026

Appearances and goals by club, season and competition
Club	Season	League			Playoffs		National cup		Continental		Other		Total	
Club	Season	Division	Apps	Goals	Apps	Goals	Apps	Goals	Apps	Goals	Apps	Goals	Apps	Goals
Toronto FC III	2014	League1 Ontario	9	1	—		—		—		—		9	1
Wilmington Hammerheads (loan)	2014	USL Pro	7	2	1	0	—		—		—		8	2
Toronto FC II	2015	USL	21	0	—		—		—		—		21	0
Louisville City FC	2016	USL	24	1	2	0	—		—		—		26	1
Louisville City FC	2017	USL	19	4	4	0	2	1	—		—		25	5
Louisville City FC	Total		43	5	6	0	2	1	—		—		51	6
Los Angeles FC	2018	MLS	20	2	—		2	0	—		—		22	2
Los Angeles FC	2019	MLS	31	4	1	0	1	0	—		—		33	4
Los Angeles FC	2020	MLS	16 (Note: Includes three appearances and one goal in MLS is Back Tournament group stage)	3	1	0	—		5 (Note: Appearances in CONCACAF Champions League/Cup)	0	2 (Note: Appearances in MLS is Back Tournament knockout stage)	0	24	3
Los Angeles FC	2021	MLS	10	0	0	0	0	0	—		—		10	0
Los Angeles FC	Total		77	9	2	0	3	0	5	0	2	0	89	9
Colorado Rapids	2021	MLS	15	1	1	0	0	0	—		—		16	1
Colorado Rapids	2022	MLS	17	3	—		1	0	2	0	—		20	3
Colorado Rapids	Total		32	4	1	0	1	0	2	0	—		36	4
Toronto FC	2022	MLS	8	0	—		0	0	—		—		8	0
Toronto FC	2023	MLS	21	2	—		1	0	—		—		22	2
Toronto FC	Total		29	2	—		1	0	—		—		30	2
New England Revolution	2023	MLS	10	0	2	0	0	0	—		4 (Note: Appearances in Leagues Cup)	0	16	0
New England Revolution	2024	MLS	21	0	0	0	—		6	0	3	0	30	0
New England Revolution	Total		31	0	2	0	0	0	6	0	7	0	46	0
San Jose Earthquakes	2025	MLS	27	1	0	0	3	0	—		0	0	30	1
Sacramento Republic	2026	USL Championship	7	1	0	0	1	0	0	0	1	0	9	1
Total			281	25	11	0	11	1	13	0	10	0	326	26

=== International ===
As of match played November 22, 2023

Appearances and goals by national team and year
National team	Year	Apps	Goals
Canada	2017	5	0
Canada	2018	1	0
Canada	2019	8	0
Canada	2020	0	0
Canada	2021	16	2
Canada	2022	8	0
Canada	2023	3	0
Total		42	2

As of March 29, 2021
Scores and results list Canada's goal tally first, score column indicates score after each Kaye goal.

List of international goals scored by Mark-Anthony Kaye
No.	Date	Venue	Opponent	Score	Result	Competition
1	March 29, 2021	IMG Academy, Bradenton, United States	Cayman Islands	5–0	11–0	2022 FIFA World Cup qualification
2	March 29, 2021	IMG Academy, Bradenton, United States	Cayman Islands	7–0	11–0	2022 FIFA World Cup qualification

== Honours ==
Toronto FC III

- League1 Ontario League Champions: 2014
- L1O/PLSQ Inter-Provincial Cup Champions: 2014

Louisville City

- USL Cup: 2017

Los Angeles FC

- Supporters' Shield: 2019

Individual

- MLS All-Star: 2019
