= Holy Cross College (Indiana) =

Private Catholic college in Notre Dame, Indiana, U.S.

Coordinates: 41°41′56.88″N 86°15′11.94″W

- Type: Private college
- Established: 1966; 60 years ago
- Religious affiliation: Catholic Church (Congregation of Holy Cross)
- Academic affiliations: ACCU; CIC
- Endowment: $6.72 million (2025)
- President: Marco J. Clark
- Vice-president: Michael Griffin
- Faculty: 27 full-time and 14 part-time
- Students: 434 (fall 2022)
- Location: Notre Dame, Indiana, U.S.
- Campus: Suburban,140 acres (0.57 km^{2})
- Colors: Maroon & Gray
- Nickname: Saints
- Sporting affiliations: NAIA – CCAC
- Mascot: "Basil" the St. Bernard (dog)
- Website: hcc-nd.edu

Holy Cross College is a private Catholic college in Notre Dame, Indiana, United States. The college was founded by members of the Congregation of Holy Cross in 1966.

== History ==
Holy Cross College was initially established in 1966 by the Mid-West Province of the Brothers of the Holy Cross as a two-year junior college, primarily to educate Holy Cross Brothers. Lay male students from the surrounding area started enrolling in 1967 and the college became coeducational in the fall of 1968. The first president and dean was John Driscoll, C.S.C. Originally, Holy Cross College only offered a two-year degree, and students would then go on to top tier institutions like Notre Dame, Purdue, or Princeton. Over time, Holy Cross College increased its enrollment and academic offerings, and started to offer four year bachelor's degree and many students would complete their education there and the institution became a destination in its own right. In 2013, the college received a record donation of $2 million from Guy Gundlach and the Elkhart County Community Foundation, aimed at providing scholarships to family and spouses of fallen veterans. David Tyson became president in 2017 and set to repair the school's finances and reorganize the school. Due to a land sale to the University of Notre Dame and a reorganization of the curriculum, the college saw its financial situation improve and its enrollment increase. Under his direction, the school reinstated the two-year program aimed at students wishing to transfer to other schools like Notre Dame, as well as a three-year program for highly motivated students, in addition to new faculty hires. In 2020, it received a $1 million grant from the Lilly Endowment Inc. through the Charting the Future of Indiana's Colleges and Universities program.

=== Presidents ===
- John Driscoll, 1966 – 1987
- James Leik, 1987 – 1988 (acting)
- David Naples, 1988 – 1990
- Raphael Wilson, 1990 – 1992 (acting)
- Richard Gilman, 1992 – 2010
- John Paige, 2011 – 2017
- David Tyson, 2017–2022
- Marco J. Clark, 2022–present

== Academics ==
The college's baccalaureate program focuses on experiential learning, founded upon a program of Four Pillars: Service Learning, Global Perspectives, Professional Internship, Classroom Experience which culminates in a capstone presentation. Each student completes the same multidisciplinary core courses. Electives may be taken which allows each student to gain knowledge and experience preferred areas of interest. Students have faculty advisors for each major and minor they are pursuing. Students may take courses at any of the local universities participating in the Northern Indiana Consortium for Education (NICE). After amassing 30 credit hours (typically after the first year of studies), students may take classes at the University of Notre Dame at no extra cost, provided they maintain at least a 3.0 grade point average.

Current accreditation at the Baccalaureate level includes ten Bachelor of Arts degrees, 17 minors, and two Bachelor of Science degrees in Biology and Computer Science. As of 2018, Business, Psychology, and Communications were the most popular major, although History and Liberal Arts have received favorable reviews. The student-faculty ratio is 12:1, and 93.4% of classes have fewer than 20 students.

=== Rankings ===
For 2022, was ranked 23rd in Regional Colleges Midwest, 27th in Best Value Schools, and 13th in Top Performers on Social Mobility by U.S. News & World Report.

== Student life ==
Students take part in the about 500 student clubs and organizations across the tri-campus community, including Notre Dame and Saint Mary's College (Indiana). The college's intramural sports include flag football, volleyball, basketball, and pickleball. Holy Cross hosts its Student Government, which is composed of the executive board, the Programming Board, and the Student Senate. The Social Concerns Committee plays an important role in the student's body volunteering and social service causes. Holy Cross students can be members of the University of Notre Dame Marching Band.

=== Housing ===
Holy Cross has seven residence halls for students: four male residence halls and three female residence halls. The six residence halls are: Anselm, Basil, James, North, Pulte, Legacy, and Holy Cross Hall. Anselm Hall, Basil Hall and Holy Cross Hall are traditional male dorms, James Hall and North Hall are traditional female dorms, and Pulte Hall and Legacy hall are apartment-style dorms, Pulte for females, and Legacy for males.

In addition to the residence halls on campus, upperclassmen are allowed to live off-campus in a co-ed apartment complex called University Edge, located roughly one mile north of Holy Cross.

== Athletics ==
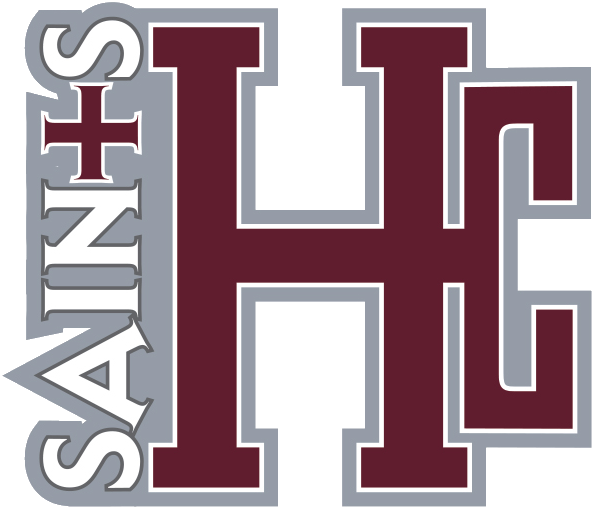
HCC athletics logo

The Holy Cross (HCC) athletic teams are called the Saints. The college is a member of the National Association of Intercollegiate Athletics (NAIA), primarily competing in the Chicagoland Collegiate Athletic Conference (CCAC) since the 2009–10 academic year. The Saints previously competed as an NAIA Independent within the Association of Independent Institutions (AII) from 2006–07 to 2008–09.

HCC competes in eight intercollegiate varsity sports: Men's sports include basketball, golf, soccer and tennis; while women's sports include basketball, golf, soccer and tennis. The HCC men's lacrosse team competed in the Great Lakes Lacrosse League (GLLL). Basketball games are covered by the Regional Radio Sports Network.

== International experience ==
Holy Cross College requires all Bachelor of Arts students to go on a global immersion experience and costs are covered by tuition. There are three primary locations:

- Uganda
- Peru
- India

Alternative programs for psychology students are available in the form of an international psychology conference, while theology students may opt to travel to Rome, Italy as part of a course entitled "Rome Through The Ages".

== Notable alumni ==
- Timothy J. DeGeeter - politician
- Joseph Fischer - politician
- Skip Holtz - college football coach
- Son Jong-hyun - professional soccer player
- Rudy Ruettiger - football player for University of Notre Dame whose life story inspired the movie Rudy
- Jeffrey Smoke - 2004 U.S. Olympic Kayak racer and two-time gold medalist in the Pan American Games
- William Albert Wack - Catholic bishop
