= Greg Ranjitsingh =

Trinidadian footballer (born 1993)

- Ranjitsingh with New York City FC in 2026

Personal information
- Full name: Gregory Nicholas Ranjitsingh
- Date of birth: 18 July 1993 (age 33)
- Place of birth: Scarborough, Ontario, Canada
- Height: 1.88 m (6 ft 2 in)
- Position: Goalkeeper

Team information
- Current team: New York City FC
- Number: 18

Youth career
- Unionville Milliken SC
- Sigma FC

College career
Years	Team	Apps	(Gls)
2011–2014	Mercer Bears	81	(0)

Senior career*
Years	Team	Apps	(Gls)
2014	Sigma FC		
2015–2018	Louisville City	78	(0)
2019	Orlando City SC	2	(0)
2020	Minnesota United FC	3	(0)
2021	Philadelphia Union	0	(0)
2021	MLS Pool	–	(–)
2021	→ Orlando City SC (loan)	0	(0)
2021	→ Los Angeles FC (loan)	0	(0)
2021	→ Philadelphia Union (loan)	0	(0)
2022–2024	Toronto FC	4	(0)
2022–2023	→ Toronto FC II (loan)	8	(0)
2025–	New York City FC	0	(0)

International career^{‡}
2019–	Trinidad and Tobago	1	(0)
- * Club domestic league appearances and goals as of 14 January 2025 ‡ National team caps and goals as of 16 May 2020

Gregory Nicholas Ranjitsingh (born 18 July 1993) is a professional footballer who plays as a goalkeeper for Major League Soccer club New York City FC. Born in Canada, Ranjitsingh represents Trinidad and Tobago internationally.

Ranjitsingh spent four years with Mercer University before joining Louisville City in March 2015. In August 2016, he became the first Louisville player to be called up for international play after the Trinidad and Tobago national team selected him for 2018 World Cup qualification.

== Early life ==
Ranjitsingh was born in Scarborough, Ontario, Canada; a suburb of Toronto. His parents are of Indo-Caribbean descent, and he would make yearly trips to his father's home country Trinidad and Tobago. His mother is of Guyanese-Portuguese descent.

== College career ==
Ranjitsingh played four years of college soccer at Mercer University between 2011 and 2014. During his Freshman year he was named the starting goalkeeper and made the Atlantic Sun Conference All-Freshman team. By the end of his senior year, he had become one of the top college goalkeepers in the nation, ranking 3rd nationally in total saves and 9th in save percentage.

He also earned the Southern Conference's goalkeeper of the year award and was named to the All-Conference team. During his time at Mercer he played 81 matches with 363 saves and 27 clean sheets. He is Mercer's career leader in both GAA and clean sheets. During the summer of 2014, Ranjitsingh played with Sigma FC of League1 Ontario.

== Club career ==
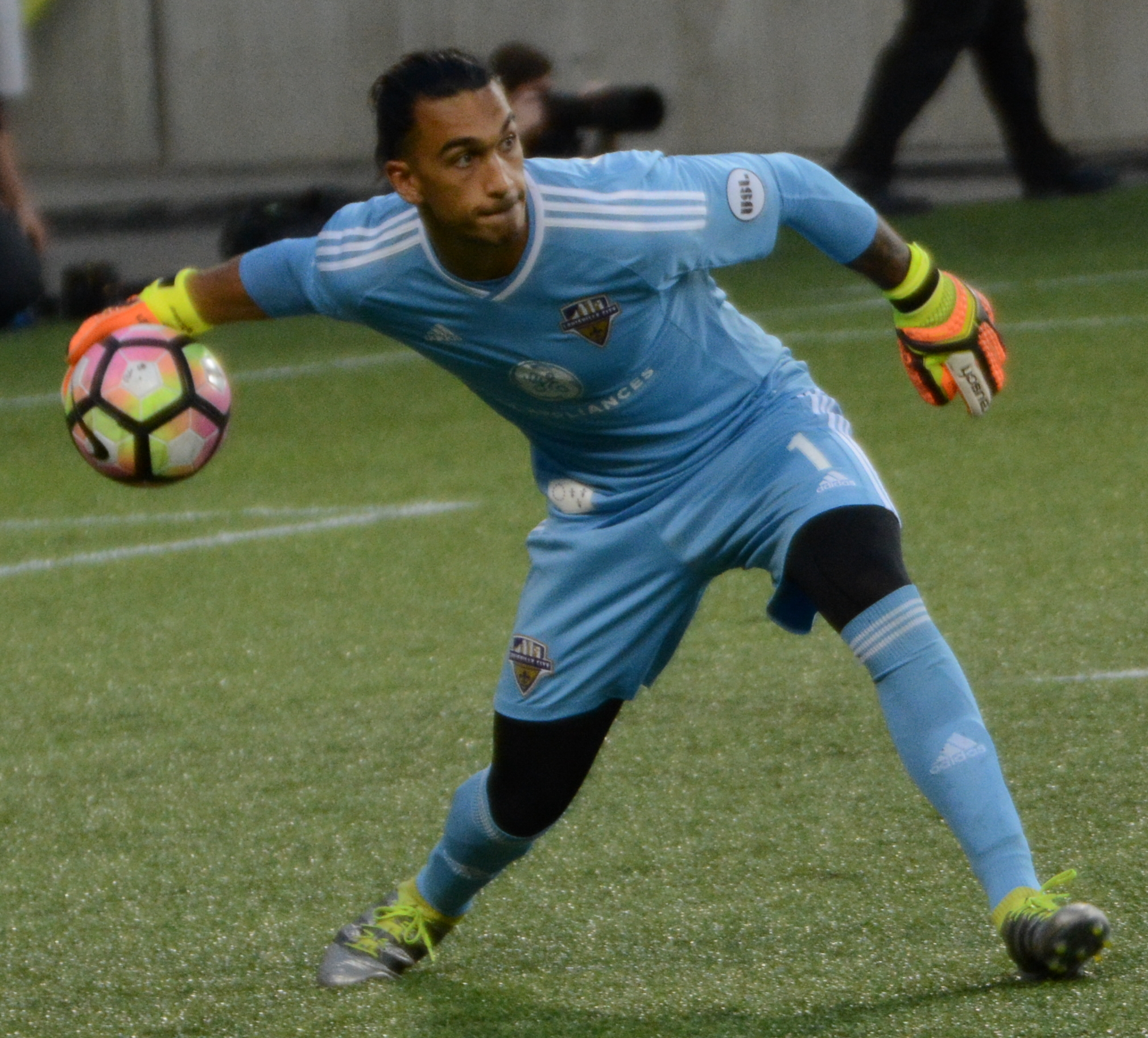
Ranjitsingh playing for Louisville City in 2017

=== Louisville City FC ===
On 26 March 2015, Ranjitsingh signed with United Soccer League club Louisville City FC and he made his debut on 20 May in the Lamar Hunt U.S. Open Cup against Lansing United. He served the season as the backup to first-choice keeper, Scotty Goodwin, and played in only one regular season match; a 2–0 loss to the Charleston Battery.

At the beginning of the 2016 season, Ranjitsingh was again the backup to Scott Goodwin. On 27 April, he entered the match against the Pittsburgh Riverhounds in the 75th minute after Goodwin was sent off. He started all matches while Goodwin was suspended and was named the primary goalkeeper when Goodwin announced that he was to retire to attend Harvard Medical School.

Ranjitsingh would play in 24 of Louisville's 30 regular season matches with 11 clean sheets, including his first 5 starts. He was also the starting goalkeeper for all three of Louisville's USL Cup playoff matches with two clean sheets. During the Eastern Conference Finals match against New York Red Bulls II, Ranjitsingh was injured in the 51st minute while Louisville lead 1–0. He was replaced by Tim Dobrowolski, and New York ultimately won the match in penalties.

Ranjitsingh renewed his contract with Louisville City FC and remained their first-choice keeper for the 2017 season. He made his season debut on 25 March against Saint Louis FC, but had to be replaced just before halftime as he suffered a hip flexor injury. He'd go on to miss several weeks and would not return until Louisville's June 3 match against the Charleston Battery where he conceded 4 goals. He would go on to play in 25 of Louisville's 32 regular season matches achieving 11 clean sheets.

He played in all four of Louisville's USL Cup matches with three clean sheets. Louisville City would again play the New York Red Bulls II in the Eastern Conference Finals. Louisville would win the match in penalties with Ranjitsingh saving two penalties in the shootout. He also won the award for Fans' Choice Save of the Playoffs for his extra-time save against New York Red Bulls II in the Eastern Conference Final of the 2017 USL Cup Playoffs. Ranjitsingh and Louisville would go on to win the USL Cup Final against Swope Park.

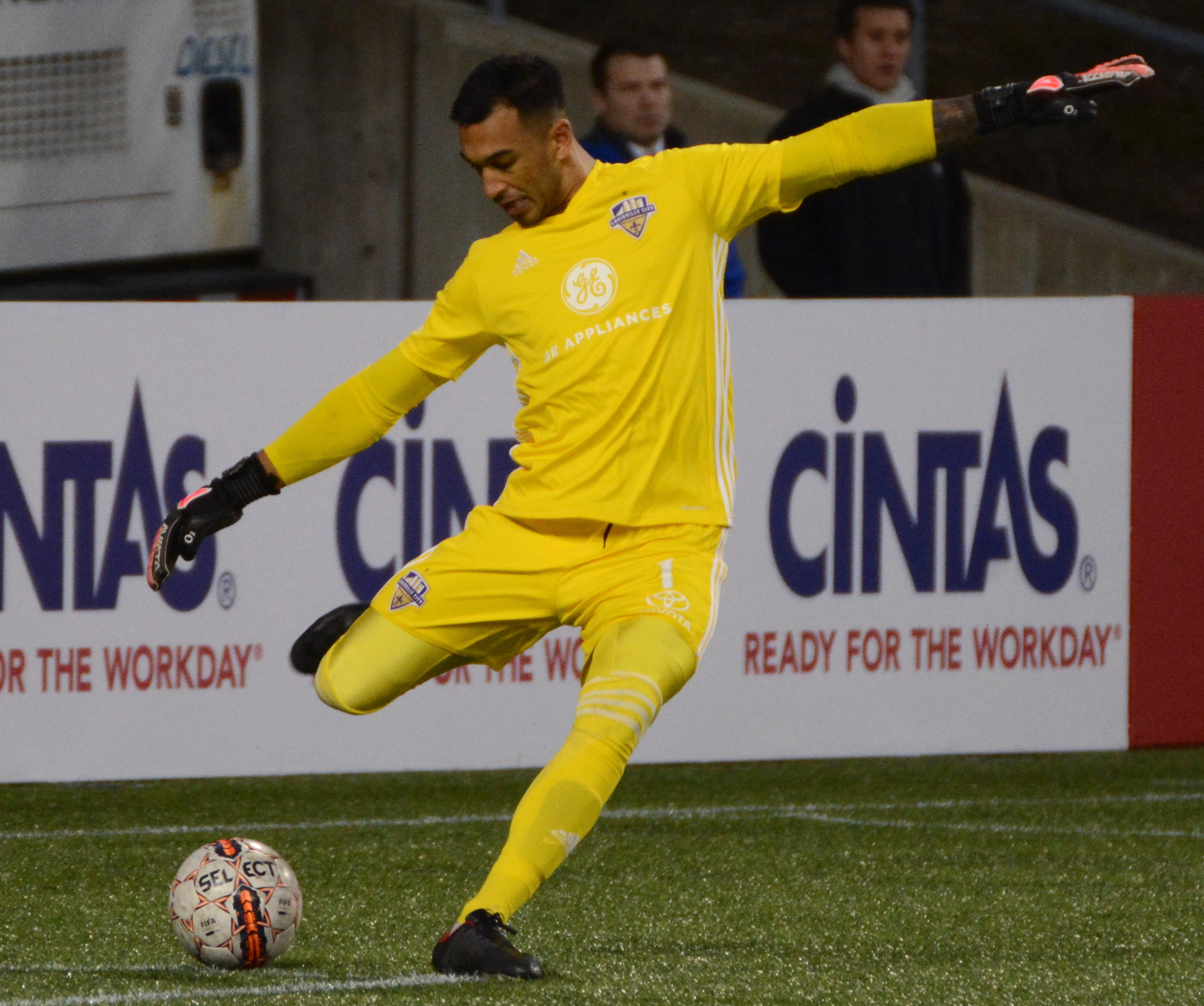
Ranjitsingh taking a goal kick in 2018

Ranjitsingh continued as Louisville's starting goalkeeper into 2018 and he made his season debut on March 17 with a clean sheet against USL expansion side Nashville SC. He appeared in 32 of Louisville's 34 league matches with 11 clean sheets. Only missing matches due to a rib injury he sustained on September 22 against Ottawa. He also appeared in all four of Louisville's USL Cup playoff matches; earning a clean sheet in two. Ranjitsingh and Louisville went on to win the USL Cup Final for the second consecutive season. This time against Phoenix.

=== Orlando City ===
On 18 December 2018, Ranjitsingh announced via a farewell social media post that he was to depart Louisville City. The following day the club confirmed he was to be reunited with James O'Connor who had left Louisville to coach Major League Soccer side Orlando City SC earlier in the year. He made his debut for the club on 15 May 2019 in a 2–1 defeat to Seattle Sounders FC. On November 21, 2019, after O'Connor was sacked, Ranjitsingh had his contract option for the 2020 season declined by Orlando as part of the end-of-season roster decisions.

=== Minnesota United FC ===
On November 25, 2019, Minnesota United FC confirmed that they had selected Greg Ranjitsingh with the 16th pick in the 2019 End-Of-Year Waiver Draft.

=== Philadelphia Union ===
In earlier 2021, he spent a week at training camp with Toronto FC, before signing a one-year contract in April, with the Philadelphia Union.

=== MLS Pool ===
During the 2021 season, he was released by Philadelphia and subsequently signed as the MLS Pool goalkeeper. On September 3, he joined Orlando City SC ahead of their match against Columbus Crew to serve as the backup, as Orlando was missing two goalkeepers due to injury and international duty. On September 15, Ranjitsingh joined Los Angeles FC for its match against Austin FC. On December 4, he was added to the roster for the Philadelphia Union ahead of their Eastern Conference playoff match against New York City FC, as the Union had 11 players enter COVID-19 health and safety protocols.

=== Toronto FC ===
In January 2022, he signed a two-year contract with an option for a third season with Toronto FC. In April, he was sent on loan to Toronto FC II. He started his first Toronto FC game on June 21, 2023, in a home game against Cincinnati. At the end of the 2023 season, Toronto declined his contract option for the 2024 season. However, he was later signed to a new contract for the 2024 season.

=== New York City FC ===
In January 2025, Ranjitsingh joined New York City FC on a two-year contract with a club option for a third year.

== International career ==
Born to a Indo-Trinidadian father and Guyanese-Portuguese mother, Ranjitsingh is eligible for Canada, Guyana, Portugal, and Trinidad and Tobago. He declared his interest in representing Trinidad and Tobago nationally due to his upbringing. In 2011, he received his first callup to the Trinidad and Tobago U20 team. He remained an active part of the U20 team.

In August 2016, Ranjitsingh received a call-up to the Trinidad and Tobago national team for 2018 World Cup qualification. He became the first Louisville City player to be called up for a senior national team, but was an unused substitute in a 2–2 draw with Guatemala and a 4–0 defeat to the USA. In 2018, Trinidad failed to pay his and 9 other players appearance fees. On May 20, 2019, Ranjitsingh was added to Trinidad and Tobago's preliminary 2019 Gold Cup roster. He was named to the final squad on June 5.

Ranjitsingh made his debut for Trinidad and Tobago in a behind-closed-doors friendly on 10 June 2019, playing the second half of a 2–0 loss to Canada.

== Honours ==
Louisville City FC

- USL Cup: 2017, 2018
