= Tim Dobrowolski =

American soccer player

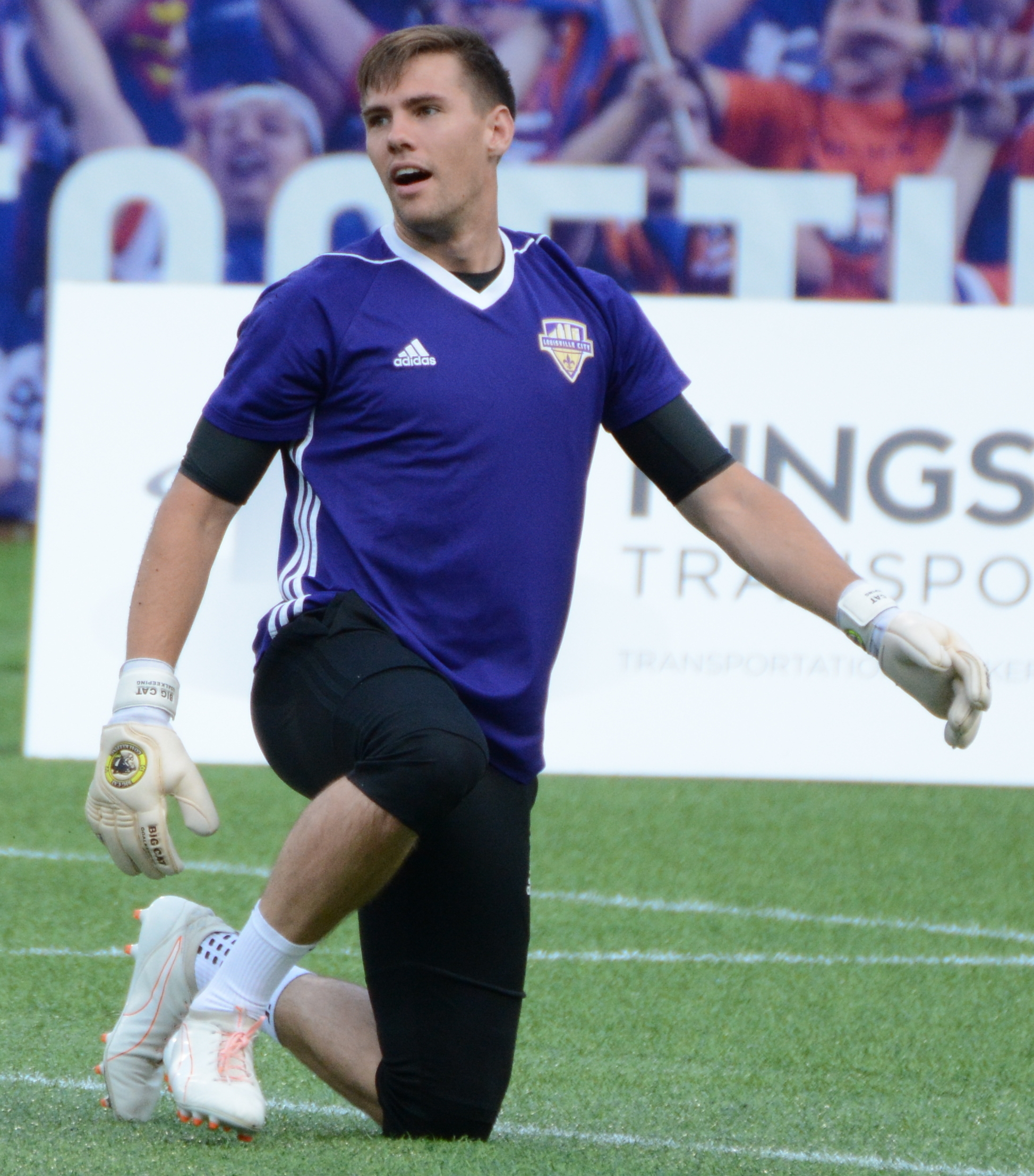
- Dobrowolski with Louisville City in 2017

Personal information
- Full name: Timothy Dobrowolski
- Date of birth: September 7, 1993 (age 33)
- Place of birth: Rockford, Illinois, U.S.
- Height: 1.90 m (6 ft 3 in)
- Position: Goalkeeper

College career
Years	Team	Apps	(Gls)
2012–2015	Loyola Ramblers	60	(0)

Senior career*
Years	Team	Apps	(Gls)
2016–2019	Louisville City	18	(0)
- * Club domestic league appearances and goals as of May 6, 2020

Timothy Dobrowolski (born September 7, 1993) is an American soccer player. He played for Louisville City FC for three years as a goalkeeper.

== Early life ==
=== Personal ===
Dobrowolski was born in Rockford, Illinois and attended Boylan Catholic High School; winning the Illinois state championship in 2010.

=== College and youth ===
Dobrowolski played college soccer at Loyola University Chicago between 2012 and 2015. He served as the team's backup goalkeeper his freshman year and was named the starting goalkeeper at the beginning of his sophomore year. He was named Missouri Valley Conference goalkeeper of the year and to the All-Conference First-Team for his play in both his junior and senior years. During his senior year he recorded eleven clean sheets to become Loyola's all-time career leader and posted a 0.40 goals against average which ranked second nationally.

== Club career ==
=== Louisville City FC ===
==== 2016 season ====
Dobrowolski signed with United Soccer League side Louisville City on June 15, 2016. He served as the backup to first choice goalkeeper Greg Ranjitsingh following the retirement of Scotty Goodwin. He made his professional debut on September 3, 2016, in a 1–0 victory over FC Montreal. He was named to the match squad for all three of Louisville's USL Cup matches but was not selected as a starter. During the Eastern Conference Finals match against New York Red Bulls II Dobrowolski entered as a substitute in the 51st minute to replace the injured Ranjitsingh. New York would later win the match in a penalty shoot-out.

==== 2017 season ====
Dobrowolski would remain at Louisville City in 2017 as the backup goalkeeper. He would make his season debut on March 25 against Saint Louis FC when he came on as a substitute for the injured Ranjitsingh just before halftime. He would go on to play in 11 of Louisville's 32 regular season matches recording 3 clean sheets as well as playing in one of Louisville's US Open Cup matches. He was named to the match squad for all four of Louisville's USL Cup matches but was not selected as a starter. Louisville would go on to win the USL Cup Final.

==== 2018 season ====
Dobrowolski continued as Louisville's backup goalkeeper into 2018 and made his season debut on May 16 in the U.S. Open Cup against the Long Island Rough Riders where he earned a clean sheet. He went on to appear in all five of Louisville's U.S. Open Cup matches with 2 clean sheets as Louisville reached the quarter-finals of the competition for the first time in its history. This included a 3–2 victory over the New England Revolution of MLS; Louisville's first victory over an MLS side. He made his first appearance in USL competition on September 22 against Ottawa when he came on to replace the injured Ranjitsingh and went on to appear in three of Louisville's league matches. Although he did not make an appearance in the USL Cup playoffs he was named to the match squad for all four of Louisville's matches as Dobrowolski and Louisville won the USL Cup Final.

=== Trials ===
Dobrowolski left Louisville following the 2019 season. In February 2020, he participated in Pittsburgh Riverhounds pre-season training as a trialist, but was not ultimately signed by the team.

== Honors ==
=== Club ===
Louisville City FC

- USL Cup (2): 2017, 2018
