= Enrique Montano =

American soccer player

Personal information
- Date of birth: May 28, 1993 (age 33)
- Place of birth: Salinas, California, United States
- Height: 1.85 m (6 ft 1 in)
- Position: Defender

College career
Years	Team	Apps	(Gls)
2011	Hartnell Panthers		
2012–2014	San Jose State Spartans		

Senior career*
Years	Team	Apps	(Gls)
2015–2016	Louisville City	31	(0)
2017	Sacramento Republic	0	(0)
2018	Deportivo Tepic		
2018	Tulsa Roughnecks	4	(0)
- * Club domestic league appearances and goals as of 17:42, 17 October 2018 (UTC)

Enrique Montano (born May 28, 1993) is an American professional soccer player who plays as a defender.

== Career ==
Montano spent three seasons playing for the San Jose State Spartans before signing professionally with Louisville City FC of the United Soccer League on February 19, 2015. He then made his professional debut for the team on May 2 against the Charlotte Independence. He started and played the whole match as Louisville City lost 1–0.

== Career statistics ==
As of April 18, 2018

Club	Season	League			Playoffs		Cup		Continental		Total	
Club	Season	Division	Apps	Goals	Apps	Goals	Apps	Goals	Apps	Goals	Apps	Goals
Louisville City	2015	USL	23	0	1	0	2	0	–		26	0
Louisville City	2016	USL	9	0	0	0	1	0	–		10	0
Louisville City	Total		32	0	1	0	3	0	0	0	36	0
Sacramento Republic	2017	USL	0	0	0	0	1	0	–		1	0
Tulsa Roughnecks	2018	USL	4	0	–		0	0	–		4	0
Career total			36	0	1	0	4	0	0	0	41	0
