= Guy Abend =

Israeli footballer (born 1990)

Guy Abend גיא אבנד
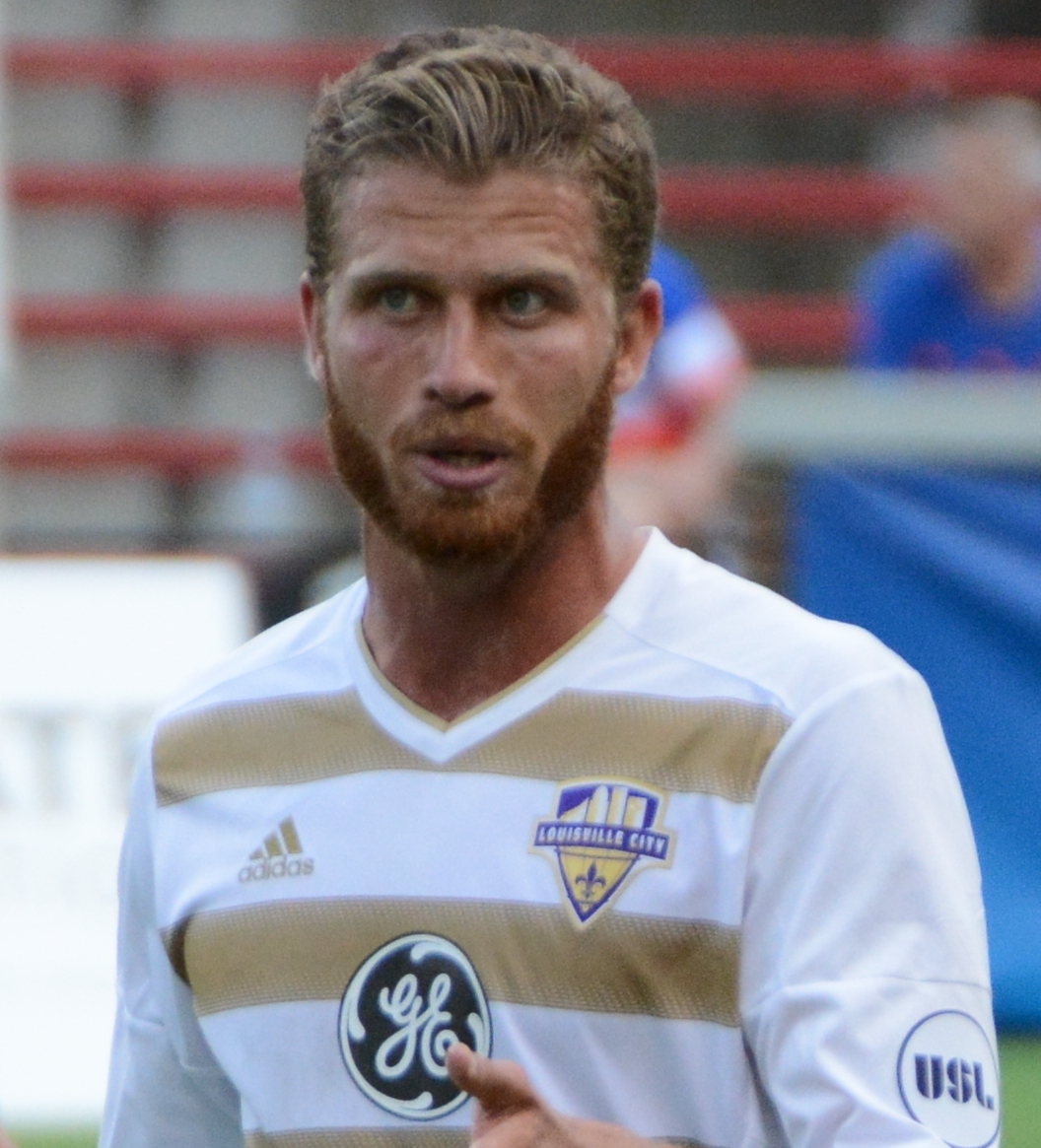
- Abend playing for Louisville City in 2017

Personal information
- Full name: Guy Abend
- Date of birth: 8 November 1990 (age 35)
- Place of birth: Netanya, Israel
- Height: 6 ft 0 in (1.83 m)
- Position: Midfielder

Youth career
- Maccabi Netanya

Senior career*
Years	Team	Apps	(Gls)
2008–2011	Maccabi Netanya	17	(0)
2010–2011	→ Hapoel Kfar Saba (loan)	14	(2)
2011–2014	Hapoel Rishon LeZion	98	(2)
2015–2017	Louisville City	78	(9)
2018	Reno 1868	32	(2)
2019–2020	Saint Louis FC	44	(4)

International career
2008	Israel U19	7	(1)
2022	United States Maccabiah futsal		
- * Club domestic league appearances and goals as of 6 October 2020

Guy Abend (Hebrew: גיא אבנד; born 8 November 1990) is an Israeli footballer.

== Early life ==
=== Personal ===
Abend was born in Netanya, Israel to parents Arie and Tali and has both an older brother and sister. Before his first birthday he and his family would move to Washington, D.C. where he would spend the next six years of his life. While in Washington he would play soccer at the Washington, D.C. Jewish Community Center and he would take his love of the sport back to Israel when he was six. He continued to play soccer with local teams in Netanya.

In 2022, Abend represented the United States in futsal at the 2022 Maccabiah Games, alongside former Louisville City teammate Matthew Fondy.

=== Youth ===
Abend joined Maccabi Netanya F.C.'s Youth system when we has fourteen.

== Club career ==
=== Maccabi Netanya FC ===
At seventeen Abend signed his first professional contract with Maccabi Netanya F.C. of the Israeli Premier League and he would make his senior debut in the 2008-09 Toto Cup. Over the course of 2 seasons Abend would appear in three Toto Cup matches as well as one match in the league.

==== Loan to Hapoel Kfar Saba FC ====
Abend would go on loan with Hapoel Kfar Saba of the Liga Leumit for the 2010–2011 season.

== Honors ==
=== Club ===
Hapoel Rishon LeZion

- Toto Cup Leumit: 2012–13

Louisville City FC

- USL Cup: 2017

== Statistics ==
Club performance			League		Cup		League Cup		Continental		Total	
Season	Club	League	Apps	Goals	Apps	Goals	Apps	Goals	Apps	Goals	Apps	Goals
2008–09	Maccabi Netanya	Ligat HaAl	0	0	0	0	1	0	0	0	1	0
2009–10	Maccabi Netanya	Ligat HaAl	1	0	0	0	2	0	0	0	3	0
2010–11	Hapoel Kfar Saba (loan)	Liga Leumit	1	0	0	0	2	0	0	0	3	0
2011–12	Hapoel Rishon LeZion	Ligat HaAl	19	0	0	0	1	0	0	0	20	0
2012–13	Hapoel Rishon LeZion	Liga Leumit	34	1	5	2	5	0	0	0	44	3
2013–14	Hapoel Rishon LeZion	Liga Leumit	33	1	4	1	0	0	0	0	37	2
2015	Louisville City	USL	10	0	0	0	0	0	0	0	10	0
2016	Louisville City	USL	23	5	1	0	3	0	0	0	27	5
2017	Louisville City	USL	27	1	2	1	0	0	0	0	29	2
2018	Reno 1868 FC	USL	19	0	1	0	2	0	0	0	22	0
2019	Saint Louis FC	USLC	0	0	0	0	0	0	0	0	0	0
Career total			167	8	13	4	16	0	0	0	196	12
