= Andrew Lubahn =

American soccer player

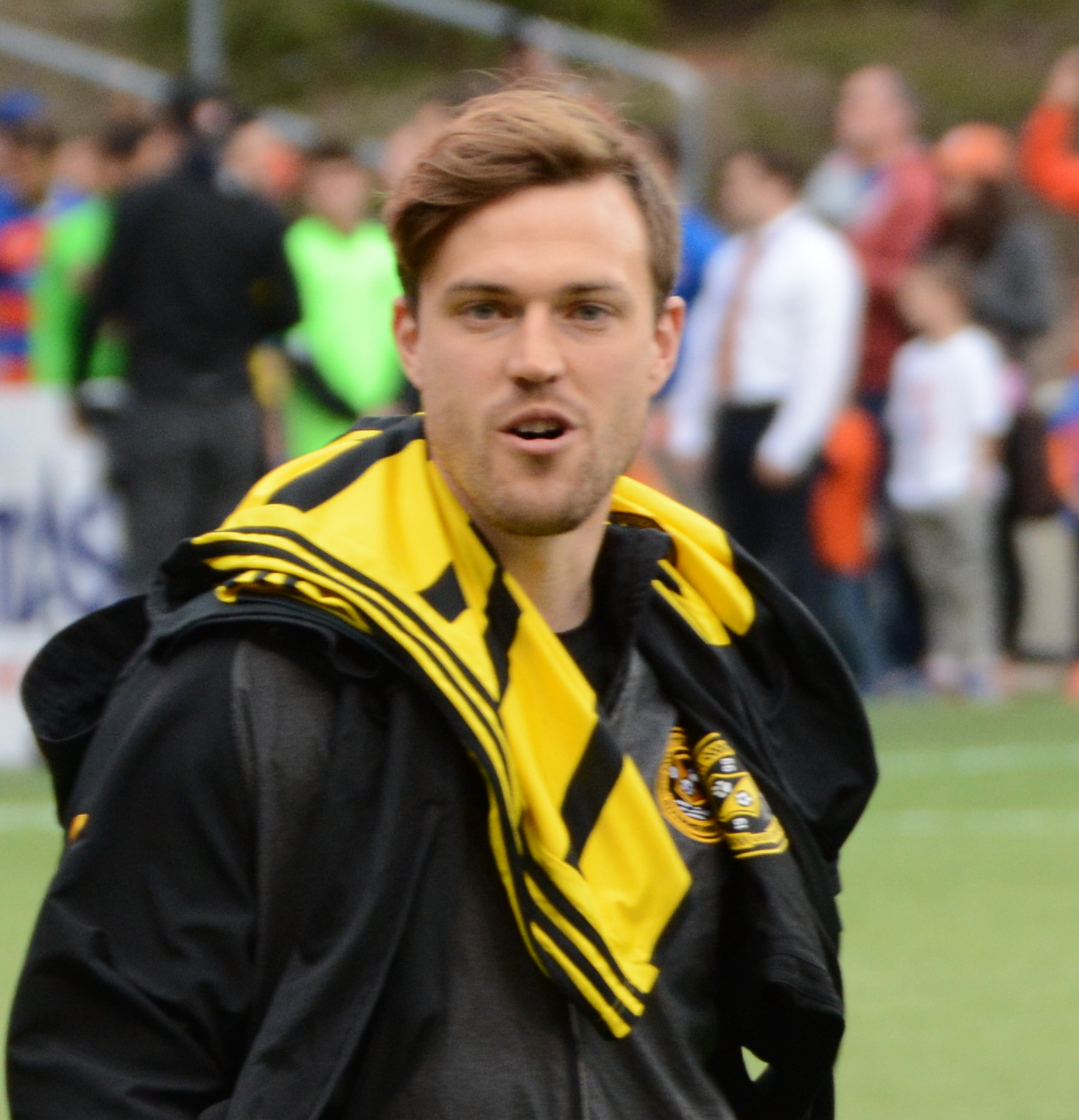
- Lubahn with Pittsburgh Riverhounds in 2018

Personal information
- Date of birth: September 10, 1991 (age 35)
- Place of birth: Erie, Pennsylvania, United States
- Height: 1.86 m (6 ft 1 in)
- Position: Winger

Youth career
- 2008: Cercle Brugge
- 2008–2009: Columbus Crew

College career
Years	Team	Apps	(Gls)
2009–2013	Wake Forest Demon Deacons	83	(27)

Senior career*
Years	Team	Apps	(Gls)
2010	Michigan Bucks	3	(0)
2011–2012	Carolina Dynamo	7	(1)
2015	Harrisburg City Islanders	10	(1)
2016	Louisville City	26	(3)
2017	San Francisco Deltas	15	(0)
2018	Pittsburgh Riverhounds SC	18	(1)
2019	Loudoun United	23	(2)
2020	New York Cosmos	4	(0)
- * Club domestic league appearances and goals as of July 14, 2023

Andrew Lubahn (born September 10, 1991) is an American retired soccer player.

== Career ==
=== Professional ===
Lubahn played college soccer at Wake Forest University between 2010 and 2013. Lubahn currently sits in the top 10 for goals scored at Wake Forest University.

While at college, Lubahn appeared for USL PDL clubs Michigan Bucks and Carolina Dynamo.

Lubahn signed with United Soccer League club Harrisburg City Islanders on August 8, 2015.

Lubahn moved to USL side Louisville City FC on January 28, 2016.

Lubahn moved to NASL side San Francisco Deltas and won the 2017 NASL Championship with the club.

Lubahn signed with USL Championship expansion club side Loudoun United FC on February 16, 2019. He is the fourth player Loudoun has signed in history. He was left as a free-agent after the 2019 USL season.
