= Ben Newnam =

American soccer player

Personal information
- Full name: Tyler Benjamin Newnam
- Date of birth: April 18, 1991 (age 35)
- Place of birth: Kernersville, North Carolina, United States
- Height: 1.76 m (5 ft 9 in)
- Position: Defender

College career
Years	Team	Apps	(Gls)
2009–2012	Wake Forest Demon Deacons men's soccer	74	(4)

Senior career*
Years	Team	Apps	(Gls)
2010	Carolina Dynamo	2	(0)
2012	Reading United	4	(0)
2013–2014	Charlotte Eagles	54	(4)
2015	Colorado Rapids	1	(0)
2015	→ Charlotte Independence (loan)	11	(0)
2015	Pittsburgh Riverhounds	6	(0)
2016	Louisville City	23	(1)
2017	San Antonio FC	24	(1)
- * Club domestic league appearances and goals as of 17:03, 21 October 2017 (UTC)

Ben Newnam (born April 18, 1991) is an American soccer player.

== Career ==
=== College and amateur ===
Newnam played four years of college soccer at Wake Forest University between 2009 and 2012.

He also played in the USL Premier Development League for Carolina Dynamo and Reading United.

=== Professional career ===
Newnam signed with USL Pro club Charlotte Eagles in April 2013.

Newnam signed with United Soccer League side Louisville City FC in January 2016.

Newnam joined USL side San Antonio FC on December 23, 2016.
