= Paco Craig (English footballer) =

English footballer (born 1992)

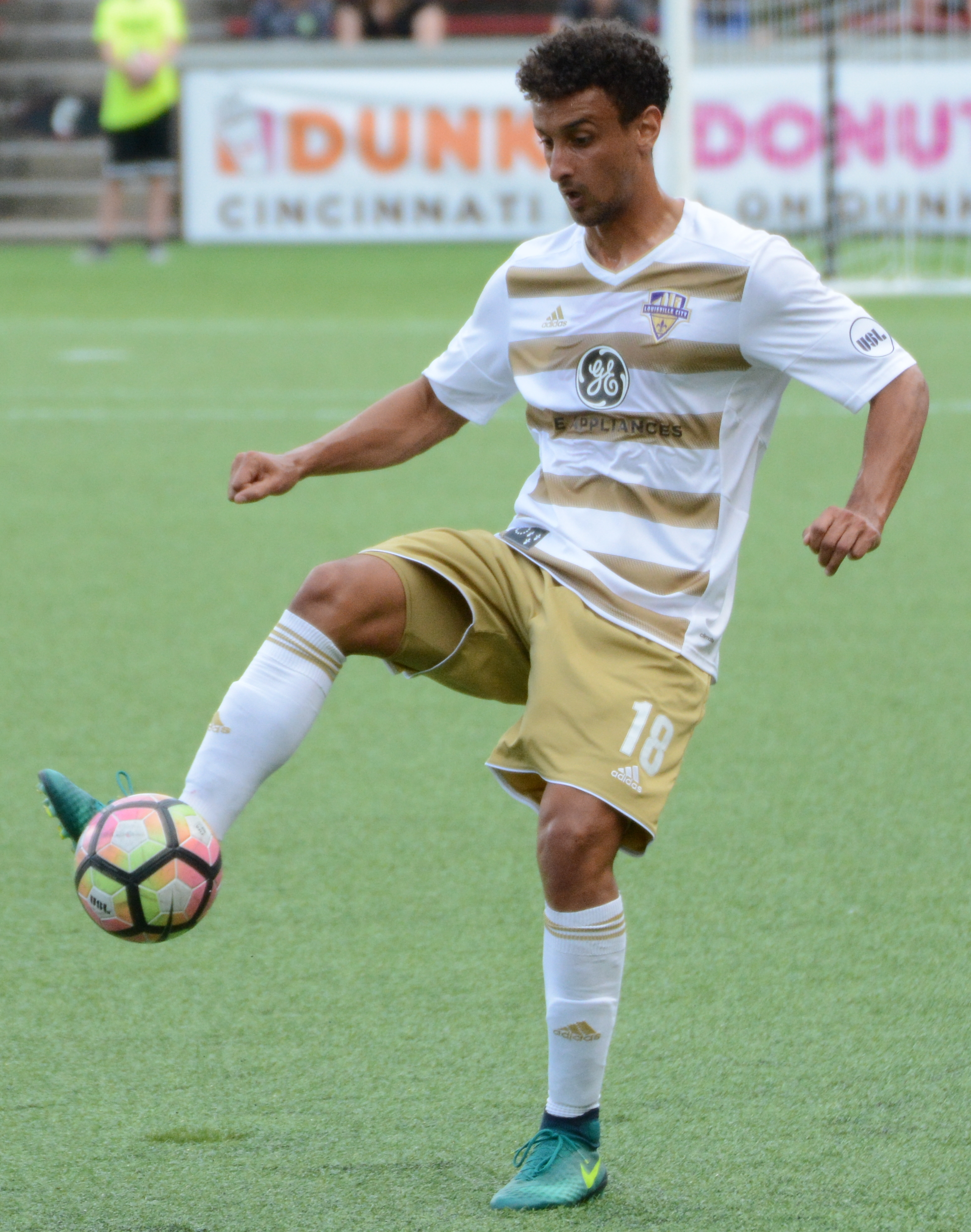
- Craig playing for Louisville City in 2017

Personal information
- Full name: Paco Gigi Craig
- Date of birth: 19 October 1992 (age 34)
- Place of birth: London, England
- Position: Defender

Team information
- Current team: Indy Eleven
- Number: 37

Youth career
- 2008–2011: West Ham United

College career
Years	Team	Apps	(Gls)
2013–2015	Young Harris Mountain Lions	57	(17)

Senior career*
Years	Team	Apps	(Gls)
2011–2012	Bishop's Stortford	22	(1)
2013	Rocket City United		
2015	Ocala Stampede	14	(1)
2016–2019	Louisville City	85	(7)
2020	Wycombe Wanderers	0	(0)
2021–2023	Miami FC	91	(6)
2024–2025	North Carolina FC	52	(4)
2026–	Indy Eleven	25	(0)
- * Club domestic league appearances and goals as of November 6, 2026

Paco Gigi Craig (born 19 October 1992) is an English professional footballer who plays as a defender for Indy Eleven in the USL Championship. He is the son of Mikey Craig, bass player of the band Culture Club.

== Early life ==
=== Personal ===
Paco Craig was born in London, England to Lilli and Mikey Craig and has two brothers as well as one half-brother and one half-sister. At the urging of his father he played both football and was a drummer in a band with his brother. He attended secondary school at Dame Alice Owen where he played rugby, football, and basketball and was named captain of his football team.

=== College and youth career ===
Craig played in the West Ham United youth system from 2008 to 2011. Following his release he went on trial with League Two side Gillingham before spending a season with National League North club Bishop's Stortford.

Not wanting to play non-league football, Craig moved to the U.S. and played three years of college soccer at Young Harris College between 2013 and 2015. In each of Craig's three seasons with the team, Young Harris College won the Peach Belt Conference title while winning the Peach Belt Conference Tournament twice. As a Freshman Craig won the Conference's Freshman of the Year award as well as winning the Conference's Player of the Year award as a Junior. Craig was the second player to win both awards during his career. He finished his career with 17 goals and 14 assists in 57 matches.

While at college, Craig played one season for the National Premier Soccer League side Rocket City United and two seasons for the Ocala Stampede of the Premier Development League. Over the course of his two seasons with Ocala, Craig appeared in 26 matches, scoring three goals with one assist. In both of his years with the Stampede, the team won the PDL's Southeastern Conference and made the national semi-final with Craig being named to the All Conference team in 2015.

== Club career ==
=== Louisville City FC ===
==== 2016 season ====
Craig signed his first professional contract with United Soccer League club Louisville City FC on 14 March 2016. He made his professional debut on 16 April against FC Cincinnati. He appeared in 15 of Louisville's 28 regular season matches scoring one goal with one assist. He played in one of Louisville's two US Open Cup matches as well as all three of Louisville's USL Cup matches. In the Eastern Conference finals match against the New York Red Bulls II Craig scored Louisville's lone goal and was sent off in extra time. Louisville lost the match on penalties.

==== 2017 season ====
Craig missed the first game of the 2017 season while serving a suspension for being sent off in the Eastern Conference Finals match from the previous season. He made his season debut on 30 March against Orlando City B and went onto play in 21 of Louisville's 32 regular season matches. He scored two goals which occurred in consecutive games on 22 and 29 July against Saint Louis FC and New York Red Bulls II respectively as well as registering two assists. In addition he appeared in one of Louisville's US Open Cup matches and all four of their USL Cup matches. At the end of the season he was named to the USL All League First Team. He was second in USL Defender of the year voting. Louisville went on to win the USL Cup Final against Swope Park.

==== 2018 season ====
Craig had his contract renewed with Louisville City FC. He made his season debut on 17 March against USL expansion side Nashville SC. Craig appeared in 32 of Louisville's 34 league matches, missing one match due to a suspension. Craig scored 2 goals. He also appeared in all five of Louisville's U.S. Open Cup matches scoring one goal as Louisville reached the quarter-finals of the competition for the first time in its history. This included a 3–2 victory over the New England Revolution of MLS; Louisville's first victory over an MLS side.

Craig appeared in all four of Louisville's USL Cup playoff matches going goalless. Craig and Louisville went on to win the USL Cup Final for the second consecutive season. This time against Phoenix. After the season he was again named to the USL All League First Team and finished second in USL Defender of the year voting behind Forrest Lasso.

=== Wycombe Wanderers ===
On 25 February 2020, Craig signed a one-month contract with Wycombe Wanderers. He played his first game against Hungerford Town on the same evening in the Berks & Bucks Senior Cup. However, he never made a league appearance for Wycombe due to his contract expiring during the COVID-19 situation.

=== Miami FC ===
On 13 January 2021, Craig signed with Miami FC of the USL Championship.

=== North Carolina FC ===
Craig signed for North Carolina FC in December 2023, ahead of the club's return to the USL Championship.

=== Indy Eleven ===
On January 21 2026, Indy Eleven announced they had signed Craig to a contract for the 2026 USL Championship season.

== Honours ==
=== Club ===
Louisville City FC

- USL Cup (2): 2017, 2018

=== Individual ===
- USL All League First Team (3): 2017, 2018, 2021
- USL All League Second Team (2): 2019, 2022
