= Son Jong-hyun =

South Korean footballer (born 1991)

Personal information
- Date of birth: 30 November 1991 (age 34)
- Place of birth: Hoein, South Korea
- Height: 1.74 m (5 ft 9 in)
- Position: Midfielder

College career
| Years | Team | Apps | (Gls) |
| 2014–2015 | Holy Cross Saints | 37 | (6) |

Senior career*
| Years | Team | Apps | (Gls) |
| 2012–2013 | Chicago Inferno | 20 | (0) |
| 2016 | Louisville City FC | 3 | (0) |
| Total | | 23 | (0) |
- * Club domestic league appearances and goals as of 10 August 2016

Son Jong-hyun (born 30 November 1991) is a South Korean former footballer who played as a midfielder.

== College career ==
In 2012, he moved to the United States and enrolled at the University of Illinois-Chicago.

In 2014, he transferred to Holy Cross College, where he began playing college soccer. In November 2014, he earned CCAC Men's Soccer Offensive Player of the Week honours. At the end of the 2014 season, he was named to the All-CCAC Second Team. At the end of the 2015 season, Son was named to the All-CCAC First Team and the NAIA Men's All-Mideast Region First Team.

== Club career ==
In 2012, he began playing with the Chicago Inferno in the Premier Development League, following a miscommunication with Orlando City SC of the USL, who had invited him to trial for the team, as they communicating via translators.

In February 2016, Son signed with USL side Louisville City FC. He departed the club in August 2016 to continue his education at Holy Cross and to complete his mandatory two years of military service in South Korea.

== International career ==
Son played for the South Korea U12 and U13 national teams.

== Career statistics ==
As of match played April 9, 2016

Appearances and goals by club, season and competition
| Club | Season | League | | | Playoffs | | National cup | | Continental | | Total | |
| Club | Season | Division | Apps | Goals | Apps | Goals | Apps | Goals | Apps | Goals | Apps | Goals |
|---|---|---|---|---|---|---|---|---|---|---|---|---|
| Chicago Inferno | 2012 | Premier Development League | 12 | 0 | — | | — | | — | | 12 | 0 |
| Chicago Inferno | 2013 | Premier Development League | 8 | 0 | — | | — | | — | | 8 | 0 |
| Chicago Inferno | Total | | 20 | 0 | 0 | 0 | 0 | 0 | 0 | 0 | 20 | 0 |
| Louisville City FC | 2016 | USL | 3 | 0 | 0 | 0 | 0 | 0 | — | | 3 | 0 |
| Career total | | | 23 | 0 | 0 | 0 | 0 | 0 | 0 | 0 | 23 | 0 |
