= Scott Goodwin =

American soccer player (born 1990)

Personal information
- Full name: Joseph Scott Goodwin
- Date of birth: 1 November 1990 (age 35)
- Place of birth: Raleigh, North Carolina, U.S.
- Height: 1.84 m (6 ft 0 in)
- Position: Goalkeeper

Youth career
- 2009–2012: North Carolina Tar Heels

Senior career*
Years	Team	Apps	(Gls)
2010	Reading United	3	(0)
2011–2012	Carolina Dynamo	18	(0)
2014	Carolina RailHawks	8	(0)
2015–2016	Louisville City FC	35	(0)
- * Club domestic league appearances and goals as of May 15, 2016

Joseph Scott Goodwin (born November 1, 1990) is an American retired soccer player who played as a goalkeeper.

== Career ==
=== College & youth ===
Goodwin played four years of college soccer at the University of North Carolina between 2009 and 2012. Goodwin was part of four straight ACC Regular Season Championships, the 2011 ACC Tournament Championship, four straight NCAA Tournament Appearances, three consecutive NCAA College Cup Appearances, and the 2011 NCAA Men's Division I National Championship.

While at college, Goodwin appeared for USL PDL clubs Reading United AC in 2010, and Carolina Dynamo in 2011 and 2012.

=== Professional ===
Goodwin signed with NASL club Carolina RailHawks on January 29, 2014. He made his professional debut on June 14, 2014, in the US Open Cup against Chivas USA.

He joined USL club Louisville City FC on March 16, 2015.

On May 27, 2016, Goodwin announced his retirement from soccer upon his acceptance to study at Harvard Medical School.
