= List of USL transfers 2015 =

The following is a list of transfers for the teams of the United Soccer League, the third tier of the United States soccer pyramid, for the 2015 season. The transactions begin at the conclusion of the 2014 USL Pro season and end after the championship match of the 2014 season. The first signing of the season was longtime Richmond Kickers midfielder Luke Vercollone who joined expansion side Colorado Springs Switchbacks FC as the club's first-ever signing. New players who are listed on a club's official roster but no official announcement was made appear at the end of the list.

== Transfers ==
Date	Name	Last Club	Moving to	Mode of Transfer	Reference
October 18, 2014	(United States) Luke Vercollone	(United States) Richmond Kickers	(United States) Colorado Springs Switchbacks	Free	
November 3, 2014	(United States) Eric Lopez	(United States) LA Galaxy Academy	(United States) LA Galaxy II	Free	
November 18, 2014	(United States) Andres Cuero	(United States) Austin Aztex (PDL)	(United States) Austin Aztex	Free	
November 18, 2014	(United States) Travis Golden	(United States) Austin Aztex (PDL)	(United States) Austin Aztex	Free	
November 18, 2014	(United States) Lance Rozeboom	(United States) Rochester Rhinos	(United States) Austin Aztex	Free	
November 18, 2014	(United States) Drew Yates	(United States) Charlotte Eagles	(United States) Austin Aztex	Free	
November 19, 2014	(United States) Carl Woszczynski	(United States) Orlando City	(United States) Arizona United	Free	
November 29, 2014	(North Macedonia) Dragan Stojkov	(United States) LA Galaxy II	(United States) Indy Eleven	Free	
December 4, 2014	(United States) Matt Bahner	(United States) Harrisburg City Islanders	(United States) Jacksonville Armada	Undisclosed	
December 4, 2014	(United States) Rob Valentino	(United States) Orlando City	(United States) Arizona United	Free	
December 5, 2014	(Israel) Guy Abend	(Israel) Hapoel Rishon LeZion	(United States) Louisville City	Free	
December 5, 2014	(United States) Kadeem Dacres	(United States) Arizona United	(United States) Louisville City	Free	
December 5, 2014	(United States) Juan Guzman	(United States) Charlotte Eagles	(United States) Louisville City	Free	
December 8, 2014	(United States) Steven Evans	(United States) Portland Timbers	(United States) Portland Timbers 2	Free	
December 16, 2014	(France) Clément Diop	(France) US Camon	(United States) LA Galaxy II	Free	
December 18, 2014	(United States) Brian Fekete	(United States) Pittsburgh Riverhounds	(United States) Austin Aztex	Free	
December 18, 2014	(United States) Max Gunderson	(United States) Oklahoma City Energy	(United States) Austin Aztex	Free	
December 18, 2014	(United States) Brendan King	(United States) Chicago Fire SC	(United States) Austin Aztex	Free	
December 18, 2014	(United States) Devin Perales	(United States) Austin Aztex (PDL)	(United States) Austin Aztex	Free	
December 19, 2014	(Costa Rica) Ariel Lassiter	(Sweden) GAIS	(United States) LA Galaxy II	Free	
January 8, 2015	(Colombia) Jorge Herrera	(United States) Charlotte Eagles	(United States) Charlotte Independence	Free	
January 8, 2015	(United States) Justin Moose	(Finland) SJK	(United States) Wilmington Hammerheads	Free	
January 8, 2015	(United States) Ben Newman	(United States) Charlotte Eagles	(United States) Charlotte Independence	Free	
January 8, 2015	(United States) Hunter Gilstrap	(United States) Pittsburgh Riverhounds	(United States) Carolina Railhawks	Free	
January 13, 2015	(United States) Mike Ambersley	(United States) Indy Eleven	(United States) Saint Louis FC	Free	
January 13, 2015	(United States) Sean Reynolds	(Iceland) FH	(United States) Louisville City	Free	
January 13, 2015	(United States) Casey Townsend	(United States) Tampa Bay Rowdies	(United States) Oklahoma City Energy	Free	
January 13, 2015	(United States) Adam West	(United States) Seattle Sounders FC U-23	(United States) Louisville City	Free	
January 14, 2015	(United States) Mikey Ambrose	(United States) Maryland Terrapins	(United States) Austin Aztex	Free	
January 15, 2015	(United States) Jacob Bushue	(United States) Indiana Hoosiers	(United States) Saint Louis FC	Free	
January 15, 2015	(Jamaica) Richard Dixon	(United States) Charlotte Eagles	(United States) Saint Louis FC	Free	
January 15, 2015	(United States) Mark Pais	(United States) Tulsa Golden Hurricane	(United States) Saint Louis FC	Free	
January 15, 2015	(United States) Patrick Slogic	(United States) Rochester Rhinos	(United States) Charlotte Independence	Free	
January 15, 2015	(Japan) Kentaro Takada	(United States) Minnesota United FC	(United States) Saint Louis FC	Free	
January 16, 2015	(Denmark) Adda Djeziri	(United States) Oklahoma City Energy	(Algeria) ASO Chlef	Free	
January 16, 2015	(United States) Eli Garner	(United States) Orange County Blues	(United States) Richmond Kickers	Free	
January 19, 2015	(United States) Ryan Roushandel	(United States) Atlanta Silverbacks	(United States) Austin Aztex	Free	
January 19, 2015	(Ghana) Fred Sekyere	(United States) Charlotte Eagles	(United States) Richmond Kickers	Free	
January 19, 2015	(United States) Bryce Taylor	(United States) Wilmington Hammerheads	(United States) Austin Aztex	Free	
January 20, 2015	(Poland) Oskar Gasecki	(Germany) Borussia Dortmund II	(United States) Saint Louis FC	Free	
January 20, 2015	(United States) Bryan Gaul	(United States) Los Angeles Galaxy	(United States) Saint Louis FC	Free	
January 20, 2015	(United States) Kyle Hoffer	(United States) Rochester Rhinos	(United States) Austin Aztex	Free	
January 20, 2015	(United States) Charles Renken	(United States) Arizona United	(United States) Saint Louis FC	Free	
January 21, 2015	(United States) Conor Shanosky	(United States) D.C. United	(United States) Louisville City	Free	
January 22, 2015	(United States) Anthony Arena	(United States) Houston Dynamo	(United States) Pittsburgh Riverhounds	Free	
January 22, 2015	(United States) Corben Bone	(United States) Philadelphia Union	(United States) Wilmington Hammerheads	Free	
January 22, 2015	(United States) Paolo DelPiccolo	(United States) Arizona United	(United States) Charlotte Independence	Free	
January 22, 2015	(Canada) Mozzi Gyorio	(United States) Minnesota United FC	(United States) Austin Aztex	Free	
January 22, 2015	(Ghana) Stephen Okai	(United States) Orange County Blues	(United States) Pittsburgh Riverhounds	Free	
January 22, 2015	(Jamaica) Ryan Thompson	(United States) Tampa Bay Rowdies	(United States) Pittsburgh Riverhounds	Free	
January 23, 2015	(England) Jamie McGuinness	(United States) IMG Academy Bradenton	(United States) Colorado Springs Switchbacks	Free	
January 23, 2015	(United States) Andrew Ribeiro	(United States) Pittsburgh Riverhounds	(United States) Charlotte Independence	Free	
January 24, 2015	(Honduras) Carlos Contreras	(United States) UW–Parkside Rangers	(United States) Colorado Springs Switchbacks	Free	
January 27, 2015	(Mexico) Miguel Gonzalez	(United States) Seattle Redhawks	(United States) Colorado Springs Switchbacks	Free	
January 27, 2015	(United States) Michael Harris	(United States) Washington Huskies	(United States) Oklahoma City Energy	Free	
January 28, 2015	(United States) Matthew Fondy	(United States) Chicago Fire	(United States) Louisville City	Free	
January 28, 2015	(United States) Daniel Gonzalez	(United States) Kitsap Pumas	(United States) Oklahoma City Energy	Free	
January 28, 2015	(United States) Josh Phillips	(United States) FC Tucson	(United States) Colorado Springs Switchbacks	Free	
January 29, 2015	(United States) Leone Cruz	(United States) San Antonio Scorpions	(United States) Austin Aztex	Free	
January 29, 2015	(United States) J. J. Greer	(United States) Charlotte Eagles	(United States) Colorado Springs Switchbacks	Free	
January 29, 2015	(United States) Cody Laurendi	(United States) LA Galaxy II	(United States) Austin Aztex	Free	
January 29, 2015	(South Africa) Gregory Mulamba	(United States) Laredo Heat	(United States) Austin Aztex	Free	
January 29, 2015	(Mexico) Chuy Sanchez	(United States) Kitsap Pumas	(United States) Oklahoma City Energy	Free	
January 30, 2015	(United States) Rony Argueta	(United States) Ventura County Fusion	(United States) Colorado Springs Switchbacks	Free	
February 1, 2015	(Denmark) Danni König	(Denmark) Vestsjælland	(United States) Oklahoma City Energy	Free	
February 2, 2015	(United States) Samir Badr	(United States) Oklahoma City Energy	(United States) Colorado Springs Switchbacks	Free	
February 3, 2015	(Denmark) Sebastian Dalgaard	(Denmark) Brønshøj	(United States) Oklahoma City Energy	Free	
February 3, 2015	(United States) Mike Seth	(United States) Pittsburgh Riverhounds	(United States) Colorado Springs Switchbacks	Free	
February 4, 2015	(United States) Davy Armstrong	(United States) Colorado Rapids	(United States) Colorado Springs Switchbacks	Free	
February 5, 2015	(United States) Bryan Burke	(United States) Orlando City	(United States) Louisville City	Free	
February 5, 2015	(Northern Ireland) Martin Maybin	(United States) Regis Rangers	(United States) Colorado Springs Switchbacks	Free	
February 6, 2015	(United States) Robbie Derschang	(United States) Harrisburg City Islanders	(United States) Arizona United	Free	
February 6, 2015	(United States) Nate Robinson	(United States) Richmond Kickers	(United States) Colorado Springs Switchbacks	Free	
February 9, 2015	(United States) Brian Ownby	(United States) Houston Dynamo	(United States) Richmond Kickers	Free	
February 9, 2015	(Jamaica) Saeed Robinson	(United States) Golden State Misioneros	(United States) Colorado Springs Switchbacks	Free	
February 10, 2015	(Colombia) José Angulo	(United States) Pittsburgh Riverhounds	(United States) Fort Lauderdale Strikers	Free	
February 10, 2015	(United States) Jordan Burt	(United States) Carolina Railhawks	(United States) Colorado Springs Switchbacks	Free	
February 10, 2015	(Hong Kong) Ryo Fujii	(United States) LA Galaxy Academy	(United States) LA Galaxy II	Free	
February 11, 2015	(United States) Aaron King	(United States) Charlotte Eagles	(United States) Colorado Springs Switchbacks	Free	
February 11, 2015	(United States) Drew Russell	(United States) Charlotte Eagles	(United States) Pittsburgh Riverhounds	Free	
February 11, 2015	(United States) Jacob VanCompernolle	(United States) UNC Wilmington Seahawks	(United States) Oklahoma City Energy	Free	
February 12, 2015	(Japan) Shintaro Harada	(United States) Dayton Dutch Lions	(United States) Colorado Springs Switchbacks	Free	
February 12, 2015	(Denmark) Danni König	(Denmark) Vestsjælland	(United States) Oklahoma City Energy	Free	
February 12, 2015	(Republic of Ireland) Niall McCabe	(United States) Young Harris Mountain Lions	(United States) Louisville City	Free	
February 12, 2015	(Denmark) Magnus Rasmussen	(Denmark) BSV	(United States) Louisville City	Free	
February 13, 2015	(Colombia) Kley Bejarano	(United States) Golden State Misioneros	(United States) Colorado Springs Switchbacks	Free	
February 13, 2015	(United States) Bryan Ciesiulka	(Sweden) Gimo	(United States) Saint Louis FC	Free	
February 13, 2015	(United States) Brock Granger	(United States) Dayton Dutch Lions	(United States) Arizona United	Free	
February 13, 2015	(United States) Parker Maher	(United States) Missouri State Bears	(United States) Saint Louis FC	Free	
February 13, 2015	(United States) Fejiro Okiomah	(United States) Indy Eleven	(United States) Pittsburgh Riverhounds	Free	
February 17, 2015	(United States) Ben Brewster	(United States) Seacoast United Phantoms	(United States) Tulsa Roughnecks	Free	
February 17, 2015	(Canada) Jackson Farmer	(Canada) Vancouver Whitecaps FC U-23	(Canada) Whitecaps FC 2	Free	
February 17, 2015	(Canada) Jordan Haynes	(Canada) Vancouver Whitecaps FC U-23	(Canada) Whitecaps FC 2	Free	
February 17, 2015	(United States) Oscar Jimenez	(United States) Seattle Sounders FC U-23	(United States) Tulsa Roughnecks	Free	
February 17, 2015	(United States) Patrick McLain	(United States) Orange County Blues	(United States) Sacramento Republic	Free	
February 17, 2015	(Canada) Mitch Piraux	(Canada) Vancouver Whitecaps FC U-23	(Canada) Whitecaps FC 2	Free	
February 18, 2015	(United States) Brandon Fricke	(United States) Des Moines Menace	(United States) Charlotte Independence	Free	
February 19, 2015	(United States) Gibson Bardsley	(Sweden) Kiruna	(United States) Tulsa Roughnecks	Free	
February 19, 2015	(United States) Kharlton Belmar	(United States) Portland Timbers U23s	(United States) Portland Timbers 2	Free	
February 19, 2015	(Argentina) Santiago Biglieri	(Argentina) Sud América	(United States) Portland Timbers 2	Free	
February 19, 2015	(Jamaica) Rennico Clarke	(Jamaica) Harbour View	(United States) Portland Timbers 2	Free	
February 19, 2015	(Australia) Harrison Delbridge	(United States) Sacramento Republic	(United States) Portland Timbers 2	Free	
February 19, 2015	(United States) Andy Lorei	(Sweden) Bodens	(United States) Tulsa Roughnecks	Free	
February 19, 2015	(England) Jack Metcalf	(United States) Clemson Tigers	(United States) Charlotte Independence	Free	
February 19, 2015	(United States) Enrique Montano	(United States) San Jose State Spartans	(United States) Louisville City	Free	
February 19, 2015	(United States) Tarek Morad	(United States) Oklahoma City Energy	(United States) Louisville City	Free	
February 19, 2015	(United States) Brent Richards	(United States) Portland Timbers	(United States) Portland Timbers 2	Free	
February 23, 2015	(United States) John McCarthy	(United States) Rochester Rhinos	(United States) Philadelphia Union	Undisclosed	
February 23, 2015	(Guyana) Emery Welshman	(Canada) Sigma FC	(United States) Real Monarchs SLC	Free	
February 24, 2015	(Serbia) Jovan Blagojevic	(Canada) Simon Fraser Clan	(Canada) Whitecaps FC 2	Free	
February 24, 2015	(Canada) Brett Levis	(Canada) Vancouver Whitecaps FC U-23	(Canada) Whitecaps FC 2	Free	
February 24, 2015	(United States) Diego Restrepo	(United States) Tampa Bay Rowdies	(United States) Charlotte Independence	Free	
February 24, 2015	(Canada) Chris Serban	(Canada) Vancouver Whitecaps FC Residency	(Canada) Whitecaps FC 2	Free	
February 25, 2015	(United States) Eli Galbraith-Knapp	(United States) San Diego Sockers	(United States) Tulsa Roughnecks	Free	
February 25, 2015	(United States) Ryan Price	(United States) Florida Atlantic Owls	(United States) Tulsa Roughnecks	Free	
February 25, 2015	(The Gambia) Sainey Touray	(United States) San Antonio Scorpions	(United States) Austin Aztex	Free	
February 26, 2015	(United States) Duncan McCormick	(United States) Seattle Sounders FC Academy	(United States) Seattle Sounders FC 2	Free	
February 26, 2015	(Canada) Tyler Rosenlund	(United States) Rochester Rhinos	(Canada) Whitecaps FC 2	Free	
February 26, 2015	(The Gambia) Amadou Sanyang	(United States) Charleston Battery	(United States) Seattle Sounders FC 2	Free	
February 27, 2015	(England) Charlie Adams	(England) Brentford	(United States) Louisville City	Free	
February 27, 2015	(United States) Nick Bibbs	(Sweden) Lammhult	(United States) Saint Louis FC	Free	
February 27, 2015	(United States) Kene Eze	(United States) Jersey Express	(United States) Pittsburgh Riverhounds	Free	
February 27, 2015	(New Zealand) James Musa	(Australia) South Melbourne	(United States) Saint Louis FC	Free	
February 28, 2015	(United States) London Woodberry	(United States) Arizona United SC	(United States) New England Revolution	Undisclosed	
March 2, 2015	(South Africa) Lebogang Moloto	(South Africa) United FC	(United States) Pittsburgh Riverhounds	Free	
March 2, 2015	(Haiti) Sébastien Thurière	(United States) Dayton Dutch Lions	(United States) Charleston Battery	Free	
March 3, 2015	(United States) Larry Jackson	(United States) New England Revolution	(United States) Wilmington Hammerheads	Free	
March 4, 2015	(Uruguay) Enzo Martínez	(United States) Carolina Railhawks	(United States) Charlotte Independence	Free	
March 4, 2015	(Spain) Victor Muñoz	(United States) Sporting Kansas City	(United States) Arizona United	Free	
March 4, 2015	(United States) Evan Newton	(United States) Arizona United	(United States) Oklahoma City Energy	Free	
March 4, 2015	(United States) Jonathan Top	(United States) FC Dallas	(United States) Arizona United	Free	
March 5, 2015	(United States) Bilal Duckett	(United States) Charlotte Eagles	(United States) Sacramento Republic	Free	
March 5, 2015	(United States) Christian Duke	(United States) Sporting Kansas City	(United States) Oklahoma City Energy	Free	
March 5, 2015	(Mexico) Gabe Gonzalez	(United States) Orange County Blues	(United States) Sacramento Republic	Free	
March 5, 2015	(United States) Alfonso Motagalvan	(United States) Pittsburgh Riverhounds	(United States) Sacramento Republic	Free	
March 5, 2015	(United States) Zev Taublieb	(United States) Valparaiso Crusaders	(United States) Sacramento Republic	Free	
March 6, 2015	(Brazil) Lucas Baldin	(United States) South Florida Bulls	(United States) Real Monarchs SLC	Free	
March 6, 2015	(El Salvador) Marvin Baumgartner	(Switzerland) FC Wettswil-Bonstetten	(United States) Real Monarchs SLC	Free	
March 6, 2015	(United States) Leon Brown	(United States) Notre Dame Fighting Irish	(United States) Real Monarchs SLC	Free	
March 6, 2015	(Brazil) Lennon Celestino	(Brazil) União Barbarense	(United States) Real Monarchs SLC	Free	
March 6, 2015	(United States) Darian Copeland	(United States) UAB Blazers	(United States) Real Monarchs SLC	Free	
March 6, 2015	(United States) Garrett Losee	(United States) BYU Cougars	(United States) Real Monarchs SLC	Free	
March 6, 2015	(United States) Riley McGovern	(United States) New Mexico Lobos	(United States) Real Monarchs SLC	Free	
March 6, 2015	(United States) Coco Navarro	(United States) Marquette Golden Eagles	(United States) Real Monarchs SLC	Free	
March 6, 2015	(United States) Nate Polak	(United States) Minnesota United FC	(United States) Louisville City	Free	
March 6, 2015	(United States) Victor Rodriguez	(United States) New Mexico Lobos	(United States) Real Monarchs SLC	Free	
March 6, 2015	(United States) Alec Sundly	(United States) New England Revolution	(United States) Real Monarchs SLC	Free	
March 6, 2015	(United States) Eti Tavares	(United States) Arizona Western Matadors	(United States) Real Monarchs SLC	Free	
March 6, 2015	(United States) Ricardo Velasco	(United States) Louisville Cardinals	(United States) Real Monarchs SLC	Free	
March 7, 2015	(United States) Sam Fink	(United States) Wake Forest Demon Deacons	(United States) Saint Louis FC	Free	
March 7, 2015	(United States) Jamiel Hardware	(United States) Harrisburg City Islanders	(United States) Saint Louis FC	Free	
March 9, 2015	(United States) Tony Rocha	(United States) Austin Aztex (PDL)	(United States) Austin Aztex	Free	
March 10, 2015	(United States) Matthias Bonvehi	(Philippines) Stallion	(United States) Sacramento Republic	Free	
March 10, 2015	(Republic of Ireland) Derek Foran	(Republic of Ireland) St Patrick's Athletic	(United States) Sacramento Republic	Free	
March 10, 2015	(Croatia) Adnan Gabeljic	(Croatia) NK Rudeš	(United States) Sacramento Republic	Free	
March 10, 2015	(Jamaica) Jeremie Lynch	(Jamaica) Harbor View	(United States) Saint Louis FC	Free	
March 10, 2015	(El Salvador) Joaquin Rivas	(United States) Kitsap Pumas	(United States) Sacramento Republic	Free	
March 10, 2015	(England) Jordan Roberts	(United States) Quincy Hawks	(United States) Saint Louis FC	Free	
March 10, 2015	(United States) Koroma Shams	(Brazil) Fluminense U23	(United States) Austin Aztex	Free	
March 10, 2015	(Hungary) Péter Tóth	(Hungary) Zalaegerszegi	(United States) Oklahoma City Energy	Free	
March 11, 2015	(United States) Bryan Byars	(United States) USAO Dovers	(United States) Oklahoma City Energy	Free	
March 11, 2015	(United States) Andy Craven	(United States) Carolina Tarheels	(United States) Seattle Sounders FC 2	Free	
March 11, 2015	(United States) Steven Miller	(United States) Wilmington Hammerheads	(United States) Tulsa Roughnecks	Free	
March 11, 2015	(Nigeria) Kyrian Nwabueze	(United States) Golden State Misioneros	(United States) Tulsa Roughnecks	Free	
March 11, 2015	(United States) Anthony Peters	(United States) Baton Rouge Capitals	(United States) Wilmington Hammerheads	Free	
March 11, 2015	(United States) Kris Tyrpak	(United States) Chivas USA	(United States) Austin Aztex	Free	
March 12, 2015	(Canada) Molham Babouli	(Canada) Toronto FC Academy	(Canada) Toronto FC II	Free	
March 12, 2015	(United States) Sal Bernal	(United States) UNLV Rebels	(Canada) Toronto FC II	Free	
March 12, 2015	(United States) Wesley Charpie	(United States) South Florida Bulls	(Canada) Toronto FC II	Free	
March 12, 2015	(Canada) Mark-Anthony Kaye	(Canada) Toronto FC Academy	(Canada) Toronto FC II	Free	
March 12, 2015	(United States) Nick Kolarac	(United States) Michigan Bucks	(United States) Pittsburgh Riverhounds	Free	
March 12, 2015	(United States) Reed McKenna	(United States) UCSB Gauchos	(United States) Oklahoma City Energy	Free	
March 12, 2015	(United States) Edwin Rivas	(United States) Cal State Northridge Matadors	(Canada) Toronto FC II	Free	
March 12, 2015	(France) Clément Simonin	(United States) North Carolina Tar Heels	(Canada) Toronto FC II	Free	
March 12, 2015	(Canada) Skylar Thomas	(United States) Syracuse Orange	(Canada) Toronto FC II	Free	
March 12, 2015	(Canada) Luca Uccello	(Canada) Toronto FC Academy	(Canada) Toronto FC II	Free	
March 12, 2015	(United States) Nick Zimmerman	(United States) Carolina Railhawks	(United States) Wilmington Hammerheads	Free	
March 13, 2015	(Canada) Yacine Ait Slimane	(Canada) Montreal Impact Academy	(Canada) FC Montreal	Free	
March 13, 2015	(Canada) Nazim Belguendouz	(Canada) Montreal Impact Academy	(Canada) FC Montreal	Free	
March 13, 2015	(Canada) Michael Bilak	(Canada) Montreal Impact Academy	(Canada) FC Montreal	Free	
March 13, 2015	(Canada) Mitchel Bringolf	(Canada) Montreal Impact Academy	(Canada) FC Montreal	Free	
March 13, 2015	(United States) Calle Brown	(United States) Virginia Cavaliers	(United States) Pittsburgh Riverhounds	Free	
March 13, 2015	(Canada) Janouk Charbonneau	(Canada) Montreal Impact Academy	(Canada) FC Montreal	Free	
March 13, 2015	(Jamaica) Omar Daley	(United States) Minnesota United FC	(United States) Oklahoma City Energy	Free	
March 13, 2015	(Canada) John Dinkota	(Canada) Montreal Impact Academy	(Canada) FC Montreal	Free	
March 13, 2015	(Canada) Marco Dominguez	(Canada) Montreal Impact Academy	(Canada) FC Montreal	Free	
March 13, 2015	(Canada) Yann-Alexandre Fillion	(Canada) Montreal Impact Academy	(Canada) FC Montreal	Free	
March 13, 2015	(Canada) Jems Geffrard	(Canada) Montreal Impact Academy	(Canada) FC Montreal	Free	
March 13, 2015	(Canada) Chakib Hocine	(Canada) Montreal Impact Academy	(Canada) FC Montreal	Free	
March 13, 2015	(Canada) Emad Houache	(Canada) Montreal Impact Academy	(Canada) FC Montreal	Free	
March 13, 2015	(Canada) Charles Joly	(Canada) Montreal Impact Academy	(Canada) FC Montreal	Free	
March 13, 2015	(Canada) Mastanabal Kacher	(Canada) Montreal Impact Academy	(Canada) FC Montreal	Free	
March 13, 2015	(Canada) Frédéric Lajoie-Gravelle	(Canada) Montreal Impact Academy	(Canada) FC Montreal	Free	
March 13, 2015	(Canada) Luca Leone	(Canada) Montreal Impact Academy	(Canada) FC Montreal	Free	
March 13, 2015	(Canada) Philippe Lincourt-Joseph	(Canada) Montreal Impact Academy	(Canada) FC Montreal	Free	
March 13, 2015	(Canada) Kevin Luarca	(Canada) Montreal Impact Academy	(Canada) FC Montreal	Free	
March 13, 2015	(Uruguay) Alex Martínez	(United States) Sporting Kansas City	(United States) Charlotte Independence	Free	
March 13, 2015	(Canada) Zakaria Messoudi	(Canada) Montreal Impact Academy	(Canada) FC Montreal	Free	
March 13, 2015	(Switzerland) Fabio Morelli	(Canada) Montreal Impact Academy	(Canada) FC Montreal	Free	
March 13, 2015	(Canada) Victor N'Diaye	(Canada) Montreal Impact Academy	(Canada) FC Montreal	Free	
March 13, 2015	(Canada) David Paulmin	(Canada) Montreal Impact Academy	(Canada) FC Montreal	Free	
March 13, 2015	(Canada) Alessandro Riggi	(Canada) Montreal Impact Academy	(Canada) FC Montreal	Free	
March 13, 2015	(Canada) Zachary Sukunda	(Canada) Montreal Impact Academy	(Canada) FC Montreal	Free	
March 13, 2015	(Canada) Mélé Temguia	(Canada) Montreal Impact Academy	(Canada) FC Montreal	Free	
March 13, 2015	(Haiti) Max Touloute	(United States) Missouri Comets	(United States) Pittsburgh Riverhounds	Free	
March 13, 2015	(Canada) Jonathan Vallée	(Canada) Montreal Impact Academy	(Canada) FC Montreal	Free	
March 13, 2015	(Canada) Franck Zoué	(Canada) Montreal Impact Academy	(Canada) FC Montreal	Free	
March 14, 2015	(United States) Jack Mathis	(United States) Drury Panthers	(United States) Saint Louis FC	Free	
March 14, 2015	(United States) Mike Roach	(United States) St. Louis Ambush	(United States) Saint Louis FC	Free	
March 14, 2015	(United States) Sean Totsch	(United States) Northern Illinois Huskies	(United States) Rochester Rhinos	Free	
March 14, 2015	(United States) Chad Vandegriffe	(United States) St. Louis Ambush	(United States) Saint Louis FC	Free	
March 15, 2015	(United States) Aaron Long	(United States) Seattle Sounders FC	(United States) Seattle Sounders FC 2	Free	
March 15, 2015	(United States) Sam Garza	(United States) Arizona United	(United States) Seattle Sounders FC 2	Free	
March 16, 2015	(Brazil) Vini Dantas	(Canada) Ottawa Fury FC	(United States) Pittsburgh Riverhounds	Free	
March 16, 2015	(United States) Scott Goodwin	(United States) Carolina Railhawks	(United States) Louisville City	Free	
March 17, 2015	(Trinidad and Tobago) Trevin Caesar	(United States) San Antonio Scorpions	(United States) Austin Aztex	Free	
March 17, 2015	(Brazil) Fernando Timbo	(Brazil) Coritiba	(United States) Austin Aztex	Free	
March 17, 2015	(Brazil) Guaraci Timbo	(Brazil) Coritiba	(United States) Austin Aztex	Free	
March 18, 2015	(Jamaica) Cardel Benbow	(Jamaica) Waterhouse	(United States) Harrisburg City Islanders	Free	
March 18, 2015	(Brazil) Erick	(Cyprus) Ermis Aradippou	(United States) Harrisburg City Islanders	Free	
March 19, 2015	(United States) Tyler Adams	(United States) New York Red Bulls Academy	(United States) New York Red Bulls II	Free	
March 19, 2015	(United States) Adonis Amaya	(United States) LA Galaxy Academy	(United States) LA Galaxy II	Free	
March 19, 2015	(Nigeria) Qudus Lawal	(United States) Chicago Fire U-23	(United States) Seattle Sounders FC 2	Free	
March 19, 2015	(United States) Zac Lubin	(Sweden) Luleå	(United States) Tulsa Roughnecks	Free	
March 19, 2015	(United States) Elijah Martin	(United States) LA Galaxy Academy	(United States) LA Galaxy II	Free	
March 19, 2015	(United States) Nick Miele	(United States) New Mexico Lobos	(United States) Seattle Sounders FC 2	Free	
March 19, 2015	(United States) Aaron Wheeler	(United States) Philadelphia Union	(United States) Wilmington Hammerheads	Free	
March 20, 2015	(Saint Vincent and the Grenadines) Oalex Anderson	(Saint Vincent and the Grenadines) System 3 FC	(United States) Seattle Sounders FC 2	Free	
March 20, 2015	(Canada) Manny Aparicio	(Canada) Toronto FC	(Canada) Toronto FC II	Loan	
March 20, 2015	(Mali) Oumar Ballo	(United States) Houston Dynamo	(United States) Charleston Battery	Loan	
March 20, 2015	(United States) Brandon Barklage	(United States) San Jose Earthquakes	(United States) Saint Louis FC	Free	
March 20, 2015	(United States) Alex Bono	(Canada) Toronto FC	(Canada) Toronto FC II	Loan	
March 20, 2015	(Canada) Adam Bouchard	(Canada) Toronto FC Academy	(Canada) Toronto FC II	Free	
March 20, 2015	(Canada) Jay Chapman	(Canada) Toronto FC	(Canada) Toronto FC II	Loan	
March 20, 2015	(United States) David Estrada	(United States) Seattle Sounders FC	(United States) Sacramento Republic	Free	
March 20, 2015	(Canada) Daniel Fabrizi	(Canada) York Lions	(Canada) Toronto FC II	Free	
March 20, 2015	(United States) Tyler Feeley	(United States) Real Salt Lake Academy	(United States) Orange County Blues	Free	
March 20, 2015	(Canada) Jordan Hamilton	(Canada) Toronto FC	(Canada) Toronto FC II	Loan	
March 20, 2015	(United States) Cameron Iwasa	(United States) UC Irvine Anteaters	(United States) Sacramento Republic	Free	
March 20, 2015	(Canada) Chris Mannella	(Canada) Toronto FC	(Canada) Toronto FC II	Loan	
March 20, 2015	(United States) Collin Martin	(United States) D.C. United	(United States) Richmond Kickers	Loan	
March 20, 2015	(United States) Jack McCracken	(United States) Loyola Marymount Lions	(United States) Orange County Blues	Free	
March 20, 2015	(Canada) Massimo Mirabelli	(Canada) FC Edmonton	(Canada) Toronto FC II	Free	
March 20, 2015	(United States) Luke Mishu	(United States) D.C. United	(United States) Richmond Kickers	Loan	
March 20, 2015	(Canada) Ashtone Morgan	(Canada) Toronto FC	(Canada) Toronto FC II	Loan	
March 20, 2015	(Canada) Quillan Roberts	(Canada) Toronto FC	(Canada) Toronto FC II	Loan	
March 20, 2015	(United States) Jalen Robinson	(United States) D.C. United	(United States) Richmond Kickers	Loan	
March 20, 2015	(United States) Memo Rodriguez	(United States) Houston Dynamo	(United States) Charleston Battery	Loan	
March 20, 2015	(Argentina) Pablo Rossi	(Argentina) Atlético de Rafaela	(United States) Seattle Sounders FC 2	Free	
March 20, 2015	(Canada) Mark Sarjeant	(United States) Grand Canyon Antelopes	(Canada) Toronto FC II	Free	
March 20, 2015	(Trinidad and Tobago) Kareem Smith	(Trinidad and Tobago) San Juan Jabloteh	(United States) Colorado Springs Switchbacks	Free	
March 20, 2015	(United States) Billy Thompson	(United States) FC Tucson	(United States) Orange County Blues	Free	
March 20, 2015	(Jamaica) O'Brian Woodbine	(Canada) Ottawa Fury FC	(United States) Charleston Battery	Free	
March 20, 2015	(United States) Travis Worra	(United States) D.C. United	(United States) Richmond Kickers	Loan	
March 21, 2015	(Canada) Giuliano Frano	(United States) Boston College Eagles	(United States) Seattle Sounders FC 2	Free	
March 23, 2015	(Scotland) Ricky Burke	(United States) Northern Virginia Royals	(United States) Richmond Kickers	Free	
March 23, 2015	(United States) Daniel Jackson	(United States) Carolina Railhawks	(United States) Charlotte Independence	Free	
March 23, 2015	(Austria) Erich Marscheider	(United States) Houston Dynamo	(United States) Charlotte Independence	Free	
March 23, 2015	(United States) Ben Newman	(United States) Charlotte Independence	(United States) Colorado Rapids	Undisclosed	
March 23, 2015	(United States) Jason Plumhoff	(United States) Reading United	(United States) Harrisburg City Islanders	Free	
March 23, 2015	(United States) Jack Thompson	(United States) Messiah College Falcons	(United States) Charlotte Independence	Free	
March 24, 2015	(United States) Jeremy Crumpton	(United States) Floridians	(United States) Colorado Springs Switchbacks	Free	
March 24, 2015	(United States) Nikita Kotlov	(United States) Portland Timbers	(United States) Saint Louis FC	Free	
March 24, 2015	(United States) Mikey Lopez	(United States) Sporting Kansas City	(United States) Oklahoma City Energy	Loan	
March 24, 2015	(United States) Sammy Ochoa	(United States) Wilmington Hammerheads	(United States) Tulsa Roughnecks	Free	
March 24, 2015	(United States) Alex Shinsky	(United States) Maryland Terrapins	(United States) Arizona United	Free	
March 24, 2015	(United States) Christian Silva	(Sweden) Karlstad	(United States) Rochester Rhinos	Free	
March 24, 2015	(United States) Ken Tribbett	(United States) Michigan Bucks	(United States) Harrisburg City Islanders	Free	
March 24, 2015	(United States) Ken Tribbett	(United States) Michigan Bucks	(United States) Harrisburg City Islanders	Free	
March 24, 2015	(United States) Braeden Troyer	(United States) South Carolina Gamecocks	(United States) Richmond Kickers	Free	
March 24, 2015	(United States) Cameron Vickers	(United States) Dayton Dutch Lions	(United States) Arizona United	Free	
March 24, 2015	(United States) Christian Volesky	(United States) SIU Edwardsville Cougars	(United States) Rochester Rhinos	Free	
March 25, 2015	(Spain) Victor Blasco	(Canada) Vancouver Island Mariners	(Canada) Whitecaps FC 2	Free	
March 25, 2015	(Switzerland) Didier Crettenand	(Switzerland) Servette	(United States) Orange County Blues	Free	
March 25, 2015	(Guam) Mason Grimes	(United States) CSSM Cougars	(United States) Tulsa Roughnecks	Free	
March 25, 2015	(Germany) Julian Ringhof	(United States) San Diego Toreros	(United States) Rochester Rhinos	Free	
March 25, 2015	(Canada) Sahil Sandhu	(Canada) Douglas College Royals	(Canada) Whitecaps FC 2	Free	
March 25, 2015	(United States) Nate Shiffman	(United States) Oklahoma City Energy	(United States) Richmond Kickers	Free	
March 24, 2015	(United States) Grant Van De Casteele	(United States) Colorado Rapids	(United States) Rochester Rhinos	Free	
March 25, 2015	(Canada) Mark Village	(Canada) UFV Cascades	(Canada) Whitecaps FC 2	Free	
March 26, 2015	(United States) Dennis Chin	(United States) Orlando City SC	(United States) Arizona United	Free	
March 26, 2015	(United States) Raphael Cox	(United States) Harrisburg City Islanders	(United States) Charlotte Independence	Free	
March 26, 2015	(United States) Chris Durkin	(United States) Richmond United	(United States) Richmond Kickers	Free	
March 26, 2015	(United States) Chris Estridge	(United States) Indy Eleven	(United States) Charlotte Independence	Free	
March 26, 2015	(United States) Ryan Finley	(United States) Columbus Crew	(United States) Charlotte Independence	Free	
March 26, 2015	(United States) Willie Hunt	(United States) Tampa Bay Rowdies	(United States) Pittsburgh Riverhounds	Free	
March 26, 2015	(Serbia) Ilija Ilic	(United States) Young Harris Mountain Lions	(United States) Louisville City	Free	
March 26, 2015	(Mali) Mamadou Kansaye	(United States) UMBC Retrievers	(United States) Charlotte Independence	Free	
March 26, 2015	(England) Cameron Lancaster	(England) St Albans City	(United States) Louisville City	Free	
March 26, 2015	(Montenegro) Luka Petričević	(Serbia) Jagodina	(United States) Orange County Blues	Free	
March 26, 2015	(United States) Jereme Raley	(United States) Maryland Terrapins	(United States) Pittsburgh Riverhounds	Free	
March 26, 2015	(Canada) Greg Ranjitsingh	(United States) Mercer Bears	(United States) Louisville City	Free	
March 26, 2015	(United States) Drew Romig	(United States) Richmond United	(United States) Richmond Kickers	Free	
March 26, 2015	(Netherlands) Denzel Slager	(England) Coventry City	(United States) Orange County Blues	Free	
April 9, 2015	(United States) Bilal Duckett	(United States) Sacramento Republic	(United States) Charlotte Independence	Free	
April 10, 2015	(Ghana) Haminu Draman	(Ghana) Asante Kotoko	(United States) Charlotte Independence	Free	
April 10, 2015	(Poland) Tomasz Zahorski	(United States) San Antonio Scorpions	(United States) Charlotte Independence	Free	
April 14, 2015	(United States) Coady Andrews	(United States) Missouri Comets	(United States) Oklahoma City Energy	Free	
April 15, 2015	(Uruguay) Max Rauhofer	(Uruguay) Sud América	(United States) Real Monarchs SLC	Free	
April 15, 2015	(Guinea) Amara Soumah	(United States) Cal State Fullerton Titans	(United States) Pittsburgh Riverhounds	Free	
April 16, 2015	(Scotland) Sean Murdoch	(Scotland) Hibernian	(United States) Rochester Rhinos	Free	
April 27, 2015	(United States) Danny Garcia	(United States) FC Dallas	(United States) Arizona United	Loan	
May 14, 2015	(Canada) Jonathan Grant	(Canada) Sigma FC	(Canada) FC Montreal	Free	
June 18, 2015	(England) Otis Earle	(United States) FC Dallas	(United States) Arizona United	Loan	
July 15, 2015	(Serbia) Pavle Popara	(Serbia) Radnički Niš	(United States) Orange County Blues	Free	
July 27, 2015	(United States) Conor Donovan	(United States) Orlando City SC	(United States) Pittsburgh Riverhounds	Loan	
July 29, 2015	(United States) Jon Okafor	(United States) Atlanta Silverbacks	(United States) Arizona United	Loan	
July 30, 2015	(United States) Tommy Redding	(United States) Orlando City SC	(United States) Wilmington Hammerheads	Loan	
July 30, 2015	(United States) Sidney Rivera	(United States) Orlando City SC	(United States) Pittsburgh Riverhounds	Loan	
August 3, 2015	(United States) Tony Donatelli	(Canada) Ottawa Fury FC	(United States) Harrisburg City Islanders	Free	
August 3, 2015	(United States) Andrew Lubahn	(United States) Wake Forest Demon Deacons	(United States) Harrisburg City Islanders	Free	
August 3, 2015	(United States) Kyle McCord	(United States) Virginia Cavaliers	(United States) Harrisburg City Islanders	Free	
August 20, 2015	(Zimbabwe) Schillo Tshuma	(United States) Portland Timbers	(United States) Arizona United	Free	
August 28, 2015	(Cameroon) Christian Bassogog	(United States) Wilmington Hammerheads	(Denmark) AaB	Free	
September 22, 2015	(China) Long Tan	(United States) Arizona United	(United States) Tampa Bay Rowdies	Loan	
