= 2015 Saint Louis FC season =

Saint Louis FC
2015 season
- CEO: Jim Kavanaugh
- Head coach: Dale Schilly
- United Soccer League: Conference: 9th League: 18th Playoffs: DNQ
- U.S. Open Cup: 4th Round
- Top goalscorer: League: 4 players (4); All: Bryan Gaul (6)
- Highest home attendance: 5,662 (September 19 vs. Louisville City)
- Lowest home attendance: League: 4,004 (May 14 vs. Toronto FC II); Open Cup: 2,579 (May 27 vs. Minnesota United)
- Average home league attendance: 4,846
- Biggest win: 2–0 (April 2 vs. Tulsa Roughnecks and September 12 vs Charlotte Independence)
- Biggest defeat: 1–4 (June 27 vs. New York Red Bulls II); 2–5 (July 15 vs. FC Montreal)
Home colors	Away colors

The 2015 Saint Louis FC season was the franchise's first season in the United Soccer League, the third division of soccer in the United States.

The club was affiliated with the Chicago Fire of Major League Soccer that season.

== Squad ==
Where a player has not declared an international allegiance, nation is determined by place of birth.

No.	Position	Nation	Player
0	GK	USA	Alec Kann (on loan from Chicago Fire)
1	GK	USA	Mark Pais
2	DF	JAM	Richard Dixon
3	DF	USA	Sam Fink
4	DF	POL	Oskar Gasecki
5	MF	USA	Bryan Ciesiulka
6	MF	USA	Parker Maher
7	MF	JAM	Jamiel Hardware
8	FW	USA	Bryan Gaul
9	FW	JAM	Jeremie Lynch
10	MF	JPN	Kentaro Takada
11	MF	USA	Charles Renken
12	DF	USA	Gabe Hoffman-Johnson
13	DF	USA	Nick Bibbs
14	DF	NZL	James Musa
15	FW	USA	Mike Ambersley
16	FW	USA	Mike Roach
17	MF	USA	Jacob Bushue
19	FW	USA	Aaron Horton
20	MF	USA	Jack Mathis
21	DF	USA	Chad Vandegriffe
22	DF	USA	Patrick Doody (on loan from Chicago Fire)
23	FW	ENG	Jordan Roberts
24	MF	USA	Peter Kelly
25	MF	USA	Brandon Barklage
26	DF	USA	Greg Cochrane (on loan from Chicago Fire)
27	MF	USA	Kingsley Bryce (on loan from Chicago Fire)
30	GK	USA	Alex Riggs
31	MF	USA	Nikita Kotlov
99	FW	USA	Mike Magee (on loan from Chicago Fire)

== Player movement ==
=== New Signings ===
No.	Position	Player	Nation	Previous Team	Date Signed	Ref
15	Forward	Mike Ambersley	United States	(United States) Indy Eleven	January 13, 2015	
17	Midfielder	Jacob Bushue	United States	(United States) Indiana Hoosiers	January 15, 2015	
2	Defender	Richard Dixon	Jamaica	(United States) Charlotte Eagles	January 15, 2015	
1	Goalkeeper	Mark Pais	United States	(United States) Des Moines Menace	January 15, 2015	
10	Midfielder	Kentaro Takada	Japan	(United States) Minnesota United	January 15, 2015	
4	Defender	Oskar Gasecki	Poland	(Germany) Borussia Dortmund II	January 20, 2015	
8	Forward	Bryan Gaul	United States	(United States) Los Angeles Galaxy	January 20, 2015	
11	Midfielder	Charles Renken	United States	(United States) Arizona United	January 20, 2015	
5	Midfielder	Bryan Ciesiulka	United States	(Sweden) Gimo IF FK	February 13, 2015	
6	Midfielder	Parker Maher	United States	(United States) Missouri State Bears	February 13, 2015	
13	Defender	Nick Bibbs	United States	(Sweden) IFK Lammhult	February 25, 2015	
14	Defender	James Musa	New Zealand	(New Zealand) Team Wellington	February 25, 2015	
3	Defender	Sam Fink	United States	(United States) Wake Forest Demon Deacons	March 7, 2015	
7	Midfielder	Jamiel Hardware	Jamaica	(United States) Harrisburg City Islanders	March 7, 2015	
9	Forward	Jeremie Lynch	Jamaica	(Jamaica) Harbour View	March 10, 2015	
23	Forward	Jordan Roberts	England	(United States) St. Louis Lions (United States) Quincy Hawks	March 10, 2015	
20	Midfielder	Jack Mathis	United States	(United States) Drury Panthers	March 13, 2015	
16	Forward	Mike Roach	United States	(United States) St. Louis Ambush (indoor)	March 13, 2015	
21	Defender	Chad Vandegriffe	United States	(United States) St. Louis Ambush (indoor)	March 13, 2015	
25	Midfielder	Brandon Barklage	United States	(United States) San Jose Earthquakes	March 20, 2015	
31	Midfielder	Nikita Kotlov	United States	(United States) Indiana Hoosiers	March 24, 2015	
24	Midfielder	Peter Kelly	United States	(United States) FC Tucson	April 29, 2015	
30	Goalkeeper	Alex Riggs	United States	(United States) Columbus Crew	April 29, 2015	
12	Defender	Gabe Hoffman-Johnson	United States	(United States) Dartmouth Big Green	May 7, 2015	
19	Forward	Aaron Horton	United States	(United States) Columbus Crew	June 29, 2015	

=== Loans ===
==== In ====
No.	Position	Player	Nation	Loaned From	Date Loaned	Notes	Ref
22	Defender	Patrick Doody	United States	(United States) Chicago Fire	March 20, 2015	Season-long loan (with option to recall)	
0	Goalkeeper	Alec Kann	United States	(United States) Chicago Fire	March 30, 2015	Season-long loan (with option to recall)	
26	Defender	Greg Cochrane	United States	(United States) Chicago Fire	April 9, 2015		
27	Midfielder	Kingsley Bryce	United States	(United States) Chicago Fire	May 29, 2015	Season-long loan (with option to recall)	
99	Forward	Mike Magee	United States	(United States) Chicago Fire	May 29, 2015	Single-game loan	
26	Defender	Greg Cochrane	United States	(United States) Chicago Fire	August 19, 2015		

==== Out ====
No.	Position	Player	Nation	Loaned To	Date Loaned	Notes	Ref
30	Goalkeeper	Alex Riggs	United States	(United States) Sporting Kansas City	June 30, 2015	Single-game loan	

== United Soccer League season ==
=== Preseason ===
February 28	SIU Edwardsville Cougars	1–2	Saint Louis FC	Edwardsville, IL
	Danzy 23'	Report	Trialist #3 27'; Gaul 87'	Stadium: Ralph Korte Stadium

March 5	Oklahoma City Energy	Cancelled	Saint Louis FC	Springfield, MO
6:00 PM CDT		Report		Stadium: Betty & Bobby Allison South Stadium
Note: Cancelled due to snow

March 11	Saint Louis FC	0–2	Indy Eleven	Fenton, MO
1:00 PM CDT		Report	Lacroix 76'; Mares 83'	Stadium: World Wide Technology Soccer Park

March 14	Saint Louis FC	0–2	Tulsa Roughnecks	Fenton, MO
7:30 PM CDT		Report	(o.g.); Bardsley 77'	Stadium: World Wide Technology Soccer Park

March 21	Tulsa Roughnecks	1–2	Saint Louis FC	Tulsa, OK
7:00 PM CDT	Black 40'	Report	Lynch 75', 90+1'	Stadium: ONEOK Field; Attendance: 3,273

=== Results summary ===
Overall								Home						Away					
Pld	W	D	L	GF	GA	GD	Pts	W	D	L	GF	GA	GD	W	D	L	GF	GA	GD
28	8	9	11	30	40	−10	33	4	4	6	17	22	−5	4	5	5	13	18	−5

Source: Match reports

Round	1	2	3	4	5	6	7	8	9	10	11	12	13	14	15	16	17	18	19	20	21	22	23	24	25	26	27	28
Stadium	A	A	H	H	A	H	H	H	A	A	H	H	H	A	A	H	A	A	H	A	H	A	H	A	A	A	H	H
Result	L	W	D	L	W	W	L	D	D	D	D	L	L	D	W	L	L	W	D	L	L	D	W	L	L	D	W	W

Source: Match reports
A = Away; H = Home; W = Win; D = Draw; L = Loss

=== Matches ===
March 28 01	Louisville City	2–0	Saint Louis FC	Louisville, KY
3:00 PM CDT	Rasmussen 23'; Adams 65'	Report	Lynch (yellow card) 70'	Stadium: Louisville Slugger Field; Attendance: 6,067

April 2 02	Tulsa Roughnecks	0–2	Saint Louis FC	Tulsa, OK
7:02 PM CDT		Report	Lynch 43'; Gaul 56'	Stadium: ONEOK Field; Attendance: 3,335; Referee: William Tomlinson

April 11 03	Saint Louis FC	1–1	Pittsburgh Riverhounds	Fenton, MO
7:30 PM CDT	Barklage 44'; Musa (yellow card) 58'	Report	Earls (yellow card) 34'; Dantas 73'; Okai (yellow card) 82'	Stadium: World Wide Technology Soccer Park; Attendance: 5,280; Referee: Nima Saghafi

April 18 04	Saint Louis FC	0–1	Rochester Rhinos	Fenton, MO
7:30 PM CDT	Gaul (yellow card) 38'	Report	Rolfe 77'	Stadium: World Wide Technology Soccer Park; Attendance: 5,001; Referee: Cedric Adams

April 25 05	Oklahoma City Energy	1–2	Saint Louis FC	Oklahoma City, OK
7:00 PM CDT	Sanchez 13'; Hedrick (red card) 81'	Report	Hardware 32'; Ambersley 42'; Bushue (yellow card) 61'; Lynch (red card) 81'; Renken (yellow card) 90'	Stadium: Taft Stadium; Attendance: 4,383; Referee: William Tomlinson

May 9 06	Saint Louis FC	1–0	Wilmington Hammerheads	Fenton, MO
7:30 PM CDT	Musa (yellow card) 74'; Fink 82'	Report	Fairclough (yellow card) 61'	Stadium: World Wide Technology Soccer Park; Attendance: 4,096; Referee: Andrew Musashe

May 14 07	Saint Louis FC	1–2	Toronto FC II	Fenton, MO
7:00 PM CDT	Gaul 1'; Musa (yellow card) 90+3'	Report	Rivas 9'; Mirabelli 38'; Uccello (yellow card) 77'; Nunes (yellow card) 89'	Stadium: World Wide Technology Soccer Park; Attendance: 4,004; Referee: Elvis Mahmutovic

May 24 08	Saint Louis FC	3–3	Louisville City	Fenton, MO
7:30 PM CDT	Lynch 21'; Bushue (yellow card) 39'; Gasecki (yellow card) 50'; Ambersley 61'; Maher (yellow card) 67'; Gaul 77' (pen.); Kann (yellow card) 81'; Musa (yellow card) 90'	Report	Fondy 30', 75'; Morad (yellow card) 38'; Goodwin (yellow card) 76'; Polak 83'; Rivera (yellow card) 90'	Stadium: World Wide Technology Soccer Park; Attendance: 4,783; Referee: Brandon Artis

May 30 09	Louisville City	1–1	Saint Louis FC	Louisville, KY
6:30 PM CDT	Dacres 50'; Montano (yellow card) 81'	Report	Renken 70', (yellow card) 84'	Stadium: Louisville Slugger Field; Attendance: 7,185; Referee: Andrew Musashe

June 6 10	Pittsburgh Riverhounds	1–1	Saint Louis FC	Pittsburgh, PA
12:00 PM CDT	Okai (yellow card) 47'; Vincent 72' (pen.); Russell (yellow card) 89'	Report	Ambersley (yellow card) 39'; Pais (yellow card) 72'; Lynch 80'	Stadium: Highmark Stadium; Attendance: 1,257; Referee: David Mon

June 13 11	Saint Louis FC	1–1	Harrisburg City Islanders	Fenton, MO
7:30 PM CDT	Fink 70'	Report	Ayuk 38'; Johnson (yellow card) 73'; Shaffer (yellow card) 90'	Stadium: World Wide Technology Soccer Park; Attendance: 4,108; Referee: Cedric Adams

June 19 12	Saint Louis FC	0–1	Colorado Springs Switchbacks	Fenton, MO
7:30 PM CDT		Report	Argueta 15'; Gonzalez (yellow card) 85'	Stadium: World Wide Technology Soccer Park; Attendance: 4,742; Referee: Dimitar Chavdarov

June 27 13	Saint Louis FC	1–4	New York Red Bulls II	Fenton, MO
7:30 PM CDT	Lynch 59'; Renken (yellow card) 90+3'	Report	Obekop 8'; Plewa 56', 90'; Tsonis (yellow card) 76'; Castellanos 83' da Fonte (yellow card) 87'	Stadium: World Wide Technology Soccer Park; Attendance: 5,260; Referee: Rubiel Vazquez

July 1 14	Wilmington Hammerheads	0–0	Saint Louis FC	Wilmington, NC
7:00 PM CDT	Martinez (yellow card) 12'	Report		Stadium: Legion Stadium; Attendance: 4,265; Referee: Mark Gorak

July 4 15	Charlotte Independence	1–2	Saint Louis FC	Charlotte, NC
7:00 PM CDT	Alvarez (yellow card) 49'; Jackson 67'; Ribeiro (yellow card) 87'; Calvert (red card) 90+4'	Report	Maher 6'; Gaul (yellow card) 45'; Lynch (yellow card) 45+2'; Bryce 88'	Stadium: Ramblewood Soccer Complex; Attendance: 1,328

July 11 16	Saint Louis FC	1–3	Richmond Kickers	Fenton, MO
7:30 PM CDT	Gaul 12' (pen.); Bushue (yellow card) 65'	Report	Taylor (yellow card) 11'; Imura (yellow card) 27'; Davis 44'; Yeisley 75'; Callahan 81'	Stadium: World Wide Technology Soccer Park; Attendance: 4,562; Referee: Kyle Burkhardt

July 15 17	FC Montreal	5–2	Saint Louis FC	Montreal, QC
5:00 PM CDT	Joly 13', 25', 40'; Messoudi 52'; Dominguez-Ramirez (yellow card) 83'; Kacher (yellow card) 86'; Riggi 87'	Report	Musa 5'; Horton (yellow card) 61'; Ambersley 71'	Stadium: Saputo Stadium; Attendance: 253; Referee: Lyes Arfa

July 18 18	Toronto FC II	0–1	Saint Louis FC	Vaughan, ON
8:00 PM CDT	Godinho (yellow card) 56'; Mirabelli (yellow card) 75'	Report	Barklage (yellow card) 29'; Godinho 39' (o.g.); Ambersley (yellow card) 51'; Gaul (yellow card) 57'	Stadium: Ontario Soccer Centre; Attendance: 552; Referee: Geoff Gamble

July 25 19	Saint Louis FC	0–0	Oklahoma City Energy	Fenton, MO
7:30 PM CDT	Bushue (yellow card) 50'; Renken (yellow card) 77'; Ambersley (yellow card) 83'	Report	Evans (yellow card) 41'	Stadium: World Wide Technology Soccer Park; Attendance: 5,304; Referee: Greg Dopka

August 2 20	New York Red Bulls II	2–1	Saint Louis FC	Hanover, NJ
4:00 PM CDT	Obekop 40'; Stolz (yellow card) 63'; Castellanos 90+2'	Report	Lynch (yellow card) 49'; Renken (yellow card) 68'; Bushue 72'; Kelly (yellow card) 84'	Stadium: New York Red Bulls Training Grounds; Attendance: 191

August 8 21	Saint Louis FC	1–3	FC Montreal	Fenton, MO
7:30 PM CDT	Gaul (yellow card) 82'; Hardware 89', (yellow card) 89'; Bibbs (red card) 90+4'; Bushue (red card) 90+4'	Report	Haman 53'; Dominguez-Ramirez (yellow card) 58'; N'Diaye (yellow card) 85'; Morelli 85'; Ait-Slimane 87'; Houache (red card) 90+4'	Stadium: World Wide Technology Soccer Park; Attendance: 5,321; Referee: Elvis Mahmutovic

August 15 22	Charleston Battery	1–1	Saint Louis FC	Charleston, SC
6:30 PM CDT	Mueller (yellow card) 33'; Boyd (yellow card) 78'; Cordovés 89'; Ferguson (yellow card) 90+6'	Report	Gaul (yellow card) 13'; Gasecki (yellow card) 29' (yellow-red card) 84'; Hardware 60'; Bryce (red card) 90+2'; Ambersley (yellow card) 90+5'	Stadium: MUSC Health Stadium; Attendance: 4,143; Referee: Neil Barbulescu

August 20 23	Saint Louis FC	3–2	Charleston Battery	Fenton, MO
7:00 PM CDT	Ambersley 33' (pen.), (yellow card) 90+1'; Hardware (yellow card) 34'; Fink (yellow card) 60', (goal) 83'; Cochrane (yellow card) 64'; Horton 90+4'; Takada (yellow card) 90+5'	Report	Cordovés 10'; Portillo 18' (pen.), (yellow card) 34'; Adjetey (yellow card) 36'; Prince (yellow card) 90+3'	Stadium: World Wide Technology Soccer Park; Attendance: 4,064; Referee: Brandon Artis
Note: Takada's yellow card was issued after being substituted out of the game

August 22 24	Richmond Kickers	2–0	Saint Louis FC	Richmond, VA
6:00 PM CDT	Lee (yellow card) 65'; Imura 70'; Yeisley 77'	Report	Doody (yellow card) 54'	Stadium: City Stadium; Attendance: 5,439; Referee: Danielle Chesky

August 30 25	Rochester Rhinos	2–0	Saint Louis FC	Rochester, NY
3:05 PM CDT	Rolfe 4'; Walls 35'	Report	Roberts (yellow card) 30'	Stadium: Sahlen's Stadium; Attendance: 5,532; Referee: Jamie Herrera

September 6 26	Harrisburg City Islanders	0–0	Saint Louis FC	Harrisburg, PA
5:30 PM CDT	Ekra (yellow card) 4'; Shaffer (red card) 90'	Report	Gaul (yellow card) 13'; Renken (red card) 90'	Stadium: Skyline Sports Complex; Referee: Greg Dopka

September 12 27	Saint Louis FC	2–0	Charlotte Independence	Fenton, MO
7:30 PM CDT	Musa 29'; Bushue 54'; Fink (yellow card) 84'	Report	DelPiccolo (yellow card) 90+3'	Stadium: World Wide Technology Soccer Park; Attendance: 5,661; Referee: Bernhard Hosu

September 19 28	Saint Louis FC	2–1	Louisville City	Fenton, MO
7:30 PM CDT	Hardware 42'; Bryce 77'; Maher (yellow card) 90+5'	Report	McCabe 11'; Guzman (yellow card) 86'; Montano (yellow card) 90+3'	Stadium: World Wide Technology Soccer Park; Attendance: 5,662; Referee: Matthew Kreitzer

=== Tables ===
==== Eastern Conference Table ====
Pos	Team	Pld	W	D	L	GF	GA	GD	Pts
7	Charlotte Independence	28	10	10	8	38	35	+3	40
8	Harrisburg City Islanders	28	11	6	11	49	53	−4	39
9	Saint Louis FC	28	8	9	11	30	40	−10	33
10	FC Montreal	28	8	4	16	32	46	−14	28
11	Toronto FC II	28	6	5	17	26	52	−26	23

Source: 2015 USL schedule
Rules for classification: 1) head-to-head; 2) total wins; 3) total goal differential; 4) total goals scored; 5) disciplinary points; 6) away goals scored; 7) away goal differential; 8) home goals scored; 9) home goal differential; 10) coin toss or drawing of lots

== U.S. Open Cup ==
=== Matches ===
May 20 2nd Round	Saint Louis FC	2–1 (a.e.t.)	Des Moines Menace	Fenton, MO
7:00 PM CDT	Gaul 68'; Musa (yellow card) 78'; Doody (yellow card) 90+2'; Lynch 97'; Dixon (yellow card) 116'	Report	Johnson (yellow card) 11'; Ben (yellow card) 32'; Polster (yellow card) 35'; Nortey (yellow card) 40'; Lujano (yellow card) 70' (yellow-red card) 108'; Bales (red card) 80'; Hellman 85' (pen.)	Stadium: World Wide Technology Soccer Park; Attendance: 3,060; Referee: Luis Guardia

May 27 3rd Round	Saint Louis FC	1–1 (a.e.t.) (3–1 p)	Minnesota United	Fenton, MO
7:00 PM CDT	Gaul 80' (pen.), (red card) 114'; Renken (yellow card) 90+1'; Lynch (yellow card) 91'; Vandegriffe (yellow card) 94'	Report	Brent Kallman (yellow card) 21'; Banks 53'; Brian Kallman (yellow card) 114'; Polak (yellow card) 118'	Stadium: World Wide Technology Soccer Park; Attendance: 2,579; Referee: Jon Freemon
	Penalties
	Barklage (penalty scored); Doody (penalty scored); Gasecki (penalty scored)		(penalty missed) Mendes; (penalty missed) Ibson; (penalty scored) Ibarra; (penalty missed) Ramirez

June 16 4th Round	Sporting Kansas City	1–0	Saint Louis FC	Kansas City, KS
7:30 PM CDT	Zusi 70'	Report	Barklage (yellow card) 54'; Renken (yellow card) 86'	Stadium: Sporting Park; Attendance: 19,298; Referee: Baboucarr Jallow

== Player statistics ==
As of September 20, 2015

=== Goals ===
Place	Name	USL	USL Playoffs	U.S. Open Cup	Total
1	(United States) Bryan Gaul	4	0	2	6
2	(Jamaica) Jeremie Lynch	4	0	1	5
3	(United States) Mike Ambersley	4	0	0	4
3	(Jamaica) Jamiel Hardware	4	0	0	4
5	(United States) Sam Fink	3	0	0	3
6	(United States) Kingsley Bryce	2	0	0	2
6	(New Zealand) James Musa	2	0	0	2
8	(United States) Brandon Barklage	1	0	0	1
8	(United States) Jacob Bushue	1	0	0	1
8	(United States) Bryan Ciesiulka	1	0	0	1
8	(United States) Aaron Horton	1	0	0	1
8	(United States) Parker Maher	1	0	0	1
8	(United States) Charles Renken	1	0	0	1

=== Assists ===
Place	Name	USL	USL Playoffs	U.S. Open Cup	Total
1	(United States) Patrick Doody	4	0	0	4
1	(United States) Bryan Gaul	4	0	0	4
3	(United States) Mike Ambersley	1	0	0	1
3	(United States) Nick Bibbs	1	0	0	1
3	(United States) Kingsley Bryce	1	0	0	1
3	(United States) Jacob Bushue	1	0	0	1
3	(Jamaica) Jeremie Lynch	1	0	0	1
3	(United States) Parker Maher	0	0	1	1
3	(United States) Charles Renken	1	0	0	1
3	(United States) Michael Roach	1	0	0	1
3	(England) Jordan Roberts	1	0	0	1

=== Shutouts ===
Place	Name	USL	USL Playoffs	U.S. Open Cup	Total
1	(United States) Alec Kann	6	0	0	6
2	(United States) Mark Pais	1	0	0	1

== Kit ==
Supplier: Nike / Sponsor: Electrical Connection, NECA/IBEW Local 1

Home	Away	Goalkeeper 1	Goalkeeper 2
