= Kings' Cup (United States) =

American soccer rivalry

- Louisville City FC Saint Louis FC / St. Louis City SC
- Location: Central United States; Interstate 64
- First meeting: LouCity 2–0 STLFC; 2015 USL (March 23, 2015)
- Latest meeting: LouCity 2–0 STLFC; 2020 USL (Oct 17, 2020)
- Next meeting: STLCSC vs LouCity; March 5, 2022

Statistics
- Total meetings: 17
- Most wins: LouCity (9)
- Top scorer: Lancaster (5)
- Largest victory: STFLC 1–5 LouCity; 2016 USL (September 17, 2016)

The Kings' Cup was a rivalry between Lou City and Saint Louis FC, members of the USL Championship. Both teams joined the second-tier league (then known as the United Soccer League) in 2015. Like the cities of both clubs, the rivalry takes its name from King Louis of France, (though not the same one – Louisville is named after Louis XVI while St. Louis after Louis IX,) which also explains the presence of the fleur-de-lis in both city flags and both teams' crests.

The rivalry officially began in both clubs' inaugural match as STLFC traveled to Louisville for their opening match in the 2015 USL season. LouCity won the match 2–0, setting the tone for the rivalry, with STLFC only winning twice as of July 18, 2020, and only earning one USL Playoffs appearance against LouCity's two USL titles. Their second match a month and a half later in St. Louis cemented the rivalry status with a 3–3 shootout that included eight yellow cards.

Due to financial challenges stemming from the COVID-19 pandemic and the upcoming creation of St. Louis City SC in Major League Soccer, STLFC folded after the 2020 season. Their final game was the only Kings' Cup playoff match, won by LouCity by the same 2–0 scoreline as the very first match in Louisville.

A renewal of the rivalry has occurred, starting in 2022 when St Louis City SC's reserve team began play with the Division 3 league MLS Next Pro. The two clubs faced off in a pre-season match on March 5, 2022, in St. Louis as well as in the third round of the 2023 U.S. Open Cup. Future preseason or U.S. Open Cup matches between St Louis City SC and Louisville City FC are expected.

== All-time results ==
Lou City win STLFC win Draw

#	Date	Competition	Venue	Home team	Score	Away team	Goalscorers	Attendance
1.	March 28, 2015	USL	Louisville Slugger Field	Louisville	2–0	Saint Louis	(H) Rasmussen, Adams (A)	6,067
2.	May 24, 2015	USL	World Wide Technology Soccer Park	Saint Louis	3–3	Louisville	(H) Lynch, Ambersley, Gaul (A) Fondy x2, Polak	4,783
3.	May 30, 2015	USL	Louisville Slugger Field	Louisville	1–1	Saint Louis	(H) Dacres (A) Renken	7,185
4.	Sept.19, 2015	USL	World Wide Technology Soccer Park	Saint Louis	2–1	Louisville	(H) Hardware, Bryce (A) McCabe	5,662
5.	May 14, 2016	USL	Louisville Slugger Field	Louisville	2–0	Saint Louis	(H) Davis, Lancaster (A)	6,067
6.	Sept.17, 2016	USL	World Wide Technology Soccer Park	Saint Louis	1–5	Louisville	(H) Roberts (A) Dacres, Lancaster, Rasmussen x2, Ilić	6,004
7.	March 25, 2017	USL	Louisville Slugger Field	Louisville	0–0	Saint Louis	(H) (A)	6,758
8.	July 22, 2017	USL	World Wide Technology Soccer Park	Saint Louis	1–4	Louisville	(H) Jackson (A) Jimenez, Craig, Spencer, Lancaster	4,310
*	March 10, 2018	friendly	Arad McCutchan Stadium (Evansville, Indiana	Louisville	1–1	Saint Louis	(H) McCabe (A) own goal	
9.	May 23, 2018	US Open Cup	Lynn Stadium	Louisville	1–0	Saint Louis	(H) Totsch (A)	2,008
10.	May 18, 2019	USL Champ.	Louisville Slugger Field	Louisville	0–0	Saint Louis	(H) (A)	9,688
11.	Oct.5, 2019	USL Champ.	World Wide Technology Soccer Park	Saint Louis	0–1	Louisville	(H) (A) Rasmussen	4,512
12.	July 18, 2020	USL Champ.	Lynn Family Stadium	Louisville	0–1	Saint Louis	(H) (A) Blackwood	4,850
13.	August 29, 2020	USL Champ.	West Community Stadium	Saint Louis	1–1	Louisville	(H) Samb (A) Totsch	0
14.	Sept.12, 2020	USL Champ.	Lynn Family Stadium	Louisville	3–0	Saint Louis	(H) Hoppenot, Lancaster, Johnson (A)	4,852
15.	Sept. 26, 2020	USL Champ.	West Community Stadium	Saint Louis	0–1	Louisville	(H) (A) Williams	0
*	Oct. 17, 2020	USL Champ. playoffs	Lynn Family Stadium	Louisville	2–0	Saint Louis	(H) Lancaster, own goal (A)	4,900

== Overall statistics ==
There have been a total of 16 competitive games (including 1 playoff match not counted toward the Kings' Cup points system) and 1 friendly between Louisville City FC and Saint Louis FC. LouCity has won 9 competitive matches (including the playoff victory) and drawn 5, with 2 wins for STLFC.

The largest victory in the series was a 5–1 victory for LouCity at STLFC's World Wide Technology Soccer Park. This also tied for the highest-scoring game in the series with a 3–3 draw also in St. Louis. STLFC's two victories have both been by one goal.

As of October 17, 2020

Competition	Matches	LouCity wins	Draws	STLFC wins	Lou City goals	STLFC goals	At Louisville	At St. Louis
USL/USL Champ.	14	7	5	2	24	10	3–3–1 (8–2)	4–2–1 (16–8)
USL Playoffs	1	1	0	0	2	0	1–0–0 (2–0)	0-0-0 (0–0)
U.S. Open Cup	1	1	0	0	1	0	1–0–0 (1–0)	0-0-0 (0–0)
Friendly	1	0	1	0	1	1	0–1–0 (1–1)	0-0-0 (0–0)
Comp. Total	16	9	5	2	27	10	5–3–1 (11–2)	4–2–1 (16–8)

=== Winners by season ===
The team with the most points from regular season matches between the two wins the Cup. Goal difference will serve as the first tiebreaker if the teams are tied on points, and away goals will be the second tiebreaker. If the teams are still tied after that, then the holder from the prior season keeps the Cup.

Year	Winner	Score
2015	LouCity	5–5 (agg. 7–6)
2016	LouCity	6–0
2017	LouCity	4–1
2018	LouCity	3–0*
2019	LouCity	4–1
2020	LouCity	7–4

* 2018 Kings' Cup decided as the winner of the USOC match

=== Honors ===
Team	USL Playoffs		USL Regular Season		U.S. Open Cup		Total honors	Major honors / Championships
Team	Winner	Runner-up	Winner	Runner-up	Winner	Furthest USL Entry	Total honors	Major honors / Championships
Louisville City FC	2	1	0	3	0	1	7	2
Saint Louis FC	0	0	0	0	0	1	1	0
Combined	2	1	0	3	0	2	8	2

== Player records ==
=== Goal scorers ===
As of October 17, 2020. Does not include own goals.

Position	Name	Team	Goals
1	(England) Cameron Lancaster	Louisville City FC	5
2	(Denmark) Magnus Rasmussen	Louisville City FC	4
3	(United States) Kadeem Dacres	Louisville City FC	2
3	(United States) Matt Fondy	Louisville City FC	2
3	(Republic of Ireland) Niall McCabe	Louisville City FC	2
3	(United States) Sean Totsch	Louisville City FC	2
7	20 players		1

== Supporters ==
The supporters' groups for both clubs predate their respective clubs by over a year. The Coopers of Louisville helped convince Orlando City owners that Louisville would be a worthy landing spot for Orlando's USL franchise when the main Orlando team moved to MLS. The Louligans of St. Louis formed to support AC St. Louis and have supported a large number of professional and amateur St. Louis-area soccer teams. The two SGs decided to form the "rivalry" as their inaugural season in USL began as a way to make things fun between expansion partners that happened to be in relatively close geographic proximity, granting the rivalry a "frenemy" status. The two SGs have worked together to raise money for charity as well.
