= Kentaro Takada =

Japanese football player

Personal information
- Full name: Kentaro Takada
- Date of birth: April 13, 1983 (age 43)
- Place of birth: Hokuto, Hokkaidō, Japan
- Height: 1.75 m (5 ft 9 in)
- Position: Midfielder

Youth career
- 2002–2005: Hokkaido University of Education

Senior career*
Years	Team	Apps	(Gls)
2007	Thespa Kusatsu	0	(0)
2009	Rochester Thunder	16	(1)
2010–2014	Minnesota United FC	79	(4)
2015–2016	Saint Louis FC	20	(0)
2015–2017	St. Louis Ambush (indoor)	29	(8)
2017	Atlanta Silverbacks	10	(1)
- * Club domestic league appearances and goals as of 23 January 2019

Kentaro Takada (高田 健太郎, Takada Kentarō; born April 13, 1983) is a retired Japanese football player who is currently the technical director for the Atlanta United RDS program Atlanta, Georgia.

== Career ==
=== Japan ===
Takada attended Hokkaido Sapporo Daiichi High School and Hokkaido University of Education. He was Hokkaido University's Rookie of the Year in 2002, participated in the national college tournament in 2003 and 2004, and received the Hokkaido College League MVP award after 2005 season.

He turned professional in 2006 with Thespa Kusatsu of the J2 League, initially with the U-23 team in 2006, before being promoted to the senior team in 2007.

=== United States ===
Takada moved to the United States in 2009, and played one season as an over-age player with the expansion Rochester Thunder in the USL Premier Development League.

He was signed by the NSC Minnesota Stars of the USSF Division 2 Professional League in 2010 after impressing during pre-season trials and, after a brief delay during which he had to return to Japan to sort out visa problems, made his debut for the team on May 29, 2010 in a game against AC St. Louis. He scored his first professional goal on September 24, 2010 in Minnesota's last regular season game of the 2010 season, a 3-1 win over FC Tampa Bay.

On January 15, 2015 it was announced that Takada had signed with USL expansion side Saint Louis FC. He made his first appearance with the team during a match against the Wilmington Hammerheads at World Wide Technology Soccer Park on May 9, 2015.

In October 2015, Takada signed with the St. Louis Ambush of the MASL for the 2015-16 season.

On December 23, 2015, Saint Louis FC announced a number of players would be returning for the 2016 season, including Takada.

On March 28, Atlanta Silverbacks announced they had signed Takada for the 2017 NPSL Season.

After playing the 2017 NPSL season with the Silverbacks, Takada joined Tucker, Georgia's Tucker Youth Soccer Association as their technical director.
