= Jacob Bushue =

American soccer player

Personal information
- Full name: Jacob M. Bushue
- Date of birth: May 15, 1992 (age 34)
- Place of birth: Champaign, Illinois, United States
- Height: 1.85 m (6 ft 1 in)
- Position: Midfielder

Youth career
- 2006–2010: Chicago Magic

College career
Years	Team	Apps	(Gls)
2010–2013	Indiana Hoosiers		

Senior career*
Years	Team	Apps	(Gls)
2011	Chicago Fire U-23	6	(0)
2015–2016	Saint Louis FC	49	(1)
2017	BK-46	21	(3)
2018	Ekenäs IF	25	(3)
2019–2022	FC Haka	67	(2)
2022	Jaro	26	(1)
2023	Las Vegas Lights	33	(0)
- * Club domestic league appearances and goals as of October 21, 2023

Jacob M. Bushue (born May 15, 1992) is an American professional soccer player who plays as a midfielder.

== Career ==
=== Youth ===
Bushue played youth soccer with the Chicago Magic from 2006 to 2010. Bushue's Chicago Magic team was a Dallas Cup Semi-Finalist in 2009. His teams also went to the US Soccer Academy Finals in both 2008 and 2009. Bushue was invited to the Adidas ESP Camp in 2008 and 2009.

=== College ===
He played college soccer at Indiana University from 2010 to 2013. During his career at Indiana, Bushue was a part of the team that won the 2012 National Championship. While at Indiana University, Bushue also won the 2010 Big Ten Conference regular season championship and the 2013 Big Ten Conference men's soccer tournament championship, and was named to the All-Tournament Team. During his career at Indiana, Bushue played in 86 games and made 79 starts for the Hoosiers, scoring 6 goals and 10 assists. After his career at Indiana, Bushue was invited to the 2014 MLS Draft Combine.

=== Professional ===
On January 15, 2015, Saint Louis FC of the USL announced the signing of Bushue for the 2015 season. He scored his first professional goal in a match on September 12 against the Charlotte Independence at World Wide Technology Soccer Park, and was named to the USL's Team of the Week for his performance.

On November 9, 2016, Saint Louis FC released Bushue

Bushue signed with the Finnish team Bollklubben-46 for the 2017 campaign. BK-46 plays in the third level of Finnish soccer as of 2017.

Bushue joined FC Haka for the 2019 season.

On January 13, 2022, he signed with Jaro.

== Personal life ==
Bushue grew up in Champaign, Illinois. His parents are Doug and Katy Bushue. Jacob and his sister Megan became the first brother–sister combination to win the News-Gazette player of the year award. Bushue attended Champaign Centennial High School, graduating in December 2009.

== Honors ==
FC Haka

- Ykkönen Winner: 2019

FF Jaro

- Ykköscup Winner: 2022
