= Oskar Gasecki =

South African-Polish footballer (born 1990)

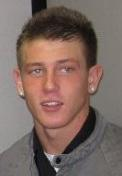
- Gasecki in 2011

Personal information
- Date of birth: 28 October 1990 (age 36)
- Place of birth: Louis Trichardt, South Africa
- Height: 1.86 m (6 ft 1 in)
- Position: Defender

Youth career
- Chicago Fire
- Metro Juniors

College career
Years	Team	Apps	(Gls)
2009–2010	Western Illinois Leathernecks	34	(4)

Senior career*
Years	Team	Apps	(Gls)
2011–2012	Borussia Dortmund	0	(0)
2011–2012	Borussia Dortmund II	10	(0)
2015	Saint Louis FC	17	(0)

International career
- Poland U18
- * Club domestic league appearances and goals

Oskar Gasecki (born 28 October 1990) is a former professional footballer who played as a defender. Born in South Africa and raised in the United States, he represents Poland at youth level.

== Early life and college ==
Gasecki was born on October 28, 1990 in Louis Trichardt, South Africa, to Polish parents. He moved with his family to Gurnee, Illinois, at the age of five. In 2009, he graduated from Warren Township High School and then began studying business administration at Western Illinois University. Gasecki played two years of college soccer at Western Illinois University.

== Club career ==
In March 2011, Gasecki participated in a trial with Borussia Dortmund, two months later, he signed a player contract that ran through the end of the 2013–2014 season. Starting July 1, 2011, Gasecki was part of reserve team . He left Borussia Dortmund in the summer of 2012.

On 20 January 2015, it was announced that Gasecki had signed with United Soccer League club Saint Louis FC.

== International career ==
Despite being born in South Africa, Gasecki was called to play for Poland U18.

== Personal life ==
He was born to Wiktor and Ewa Gasecki, migrant workers originally from Stalowa Wola. The family maintained strong cultural ties to Poland and raised Gasecki immersed in his cultural heritage.

Gasecki also holds U.S. citizenship, which he obtained by living in the country his entire life.
