= Charles Joly =

Canadian soccer player (born 1995)

Personal information
- Full name: Charles Joly
- Date of birth: October 24, 1995 (age 31)
- Place of birth: Sainte-Mélanie, Quebec, Canada
- Height: 5 ft 9 in (1.75 m)
- Position: Forward

Youth career
- 2012–2014: Montreal Impact

College career
Years	Team	Apps	(Gls)
2017–2019	Laval Rouge et Or		

Senior career*
Years	Team	Apps	(Gls)
2012	Montreal Impact Academy		
2014	Montreal Impact U23		
2015–2016	FC Montreal	19	(4)
- * Club domestic league appearances and goals

Charles Joly (born October 24, 1995) is a former Canadian soccer player who played as a forward.

== Club career ==
=== Early career ===
Joly joined the Montreal Impact Academy and competed in the Canadian Soccer League's first division in 2012. In his debut season in the inter-provincial circuit, he helped Montreal produce a nine-game undefeated streak and secure a playoff berth by finishing second in the division. Montreal would reach the championship final match where they were defeated by Toronto Croatia.

In 2013, when Montreal left the CSL circuit he resumed playing with the academy side in the U.S. Soccer Development Academy. He also made an appearance with the senior team's reserve squad in the MLS Reserve League. His final run with the academy was during the 2014 season when the team competed in the American-based USL Premier Development League.

=== USL ===
On March 13, 2015, Joly signed with FC Montreal, a USL affiliate club of the Montreal Impact for their inaugural season. He made his debut for the club on June 15, 2015, against the Pittsburgh Riverhounds. Joly recorded his first club hat-trick against Saint Louis FC on July 2, 2015. Following his performance against St. Louis, he was named the league's player of the week. In his debut season in the American circuit, he appeared in 11 matches and recorded 3 goals.

On March 11, 2016, he re-signed with Montreal for the 2016 season. He recorded his first of the season on April 23, 2016, against Rochester New York. Throughout the season, he assisted the club in producing a five-match undefeated streak. In his second season with Montreal, he played in 8 matches and contributed 1 goal.

=== College soccer ===
In the fall of 2016, he began playing at the college level with Laval Rouge et Or. In his debut season, he was named to the Second All-Star team and a second time in 2019. He would graduate from the program after the 2019 season.

== International career ==
He represented the province of Quebec at the 2013 Canada Summer Games, where the team won the gold medal. He was selected for the tournament All-Star team and named Top Player. In 2014, he was called to camp for the Canada U20 team under head coach Rob Gale.
