= Bryan Ciesiulka =

American professional soccer player

Personal information
- Date of birth: October 10, 1991 (age 35)
- Place of birth: Naperville, Illinois, United States
- Height: 1.63 m (5 ft 4 in)
- Position: Midfielder

Youth career
- 2008–2010: Chicago Fire
- 2010–2013: Marquette Golden Eagles

Senior career*
Years	Team	Apps	(Gls)
2012–2013	Chicago Fire U-23	23	(4)
2014	Gimo IF FK		
2015	Saint Louis FC	21	(1)
2016	Kokomo Mantis FC	14	(0)
- * Club domestic league appearances and goals as of August 27, 2015

Bryan Ciesiulka (born October 10, 1991) is an American professional soccer player.

== Career ==
=== Youth ===
Ciesiulka played for Neuqua Valley High School in Naperville, Illinois. He was named a NSCAA/adidas All-American as a senior in 2009. He was named Gatorade Illinois Boys Soccer Player of the Year in 2009. Bryan also played for the Chicago Fire Academy from 2007 to 2010.

=== College ===
Ciesiulka played college soccer at Marquette University. While at Marquette, Bryan helped the Golden Eagles win the school's first Big East Conference Division Title in 2011. The Golden Eagles again won the Big East in his senior season in 2013. He was a three time captain at Marquette. Prior to his senior season, Bryan was named to the Soccer America All-American team. Bryan was a Senior CLASS Award finalist in 2013. In 2013, Bryan was named Big East Midfielder of the Year, as well as making the All-Conference First Team. Bryan ended his career with 9 goals and 17 assists, while playing in 69 career games with 63 starts.

=== Professional ===
Ciesiulka was selected by the Chicago Fire in the 2014 MLS SuperDraft, but was released prior to the start of the season. Ciesiulka signed shortly thereafter with Swedish club Gimo IF FK.

On February 13, 2015, USL club Saint Louis FC announced their signing of Ciesiulka.

== Personal ==
Ciesiulka grew up in Naperville, Illinois. Bryan is the son of Philip and Nancy Ciesiulka. He has two sisters, Jenny and Katie. Katie currently plays soccer at Marquette.
