= Sam Fink (soccer) =

American soccer player

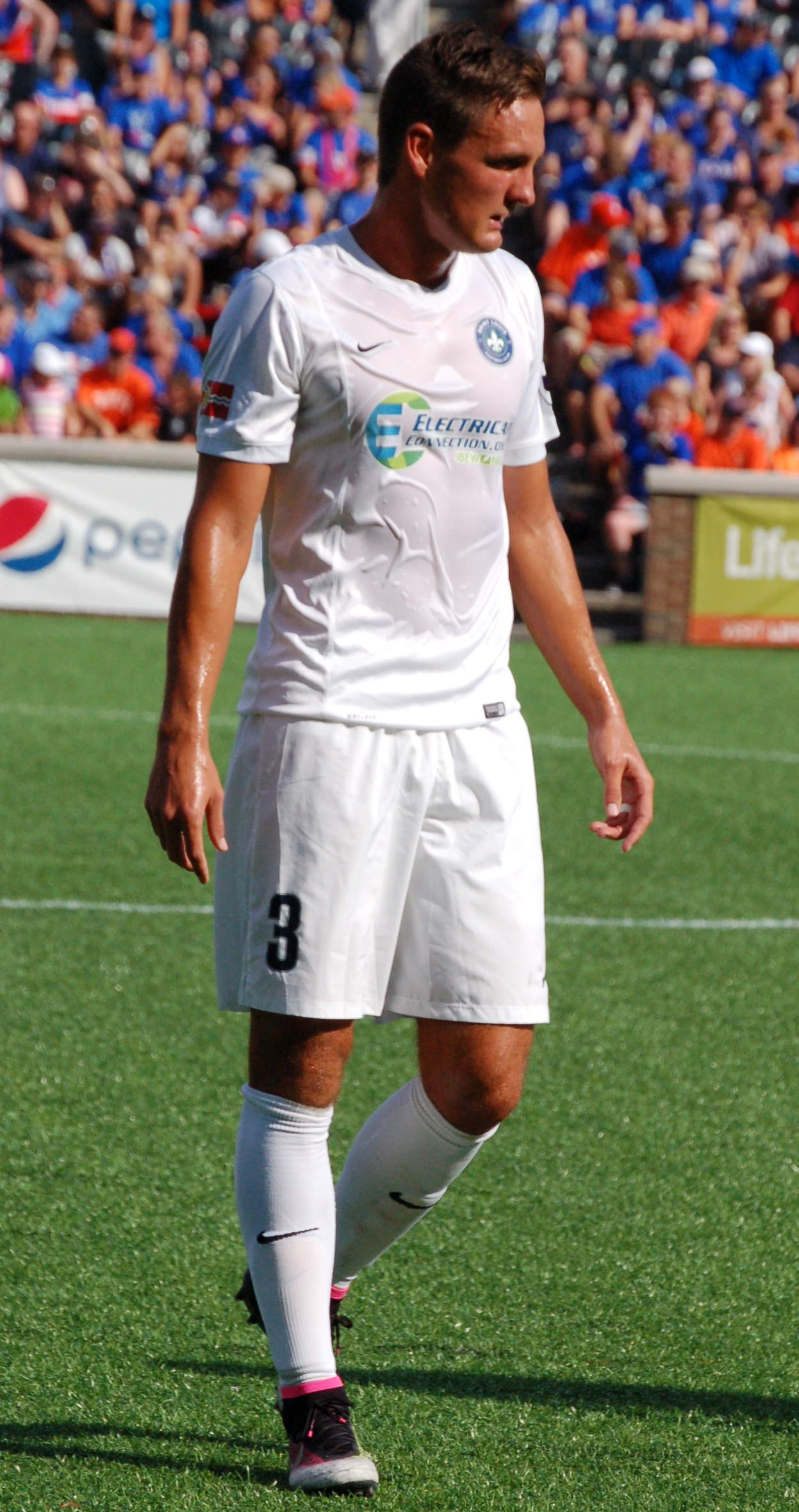
- Fink playing for Saint Louis FC in 2016

Personal information
- Date of birth: May 8, 1993 (age 33)
- Place of birth: Bridgeton, Missouri, United States
- Height: 1.88 m (6 ft 2 in)
- Position: Defender

College career
Years	Team	Apps	(Gls)
2011–2014	Wake Forest Demon Deacons		

Senior career*
Years	Team	Apps	(Gls)
2015–2016	Saint Louis FC	53	(4)
2017	Oklahoma City Energy	17	(0)
2018–2020	Saint Louis FC	70	(9)
- * Club domestic league appearances and goals as of October 6, 2020

Sam Fink (born May 8, 1993) is an American soccer player.

== Career ==
=== College ===
Fink played four years of college soccer at Wake Forest University between 2011 and 2014.

=== Professional ===
On March 7, 2015, it was announced that Fink had signed with USL team Saint Louis FC. He scored his first professional goal on May 9 during a match against Wilmington Hammerheads FC at World Wide Technology Soccer Park, earning a spot on the USL Team of the Week. He was again named to the Team of the Week following his performance in a come-from-behind victory at home against the Charleston Battery on August 20, becoming the first Saint Louis FC player to receive the award twice. Fink played every minute of all 28 games during the 2015 season, one of just two USL players to manage the feat that year.

Fink was released by Saint Louis FC on November 10, 2016.

On November 30, 2016, Fink was signed by fellow USL Western Conference side Oklahoma City Energy FC.

On December 13, 2017, Fink was re-signed by his hometown and debut club, Saint Louis FC for the 2018 season. Saint Louis FC folded following the 2020 USL Championship season.
