= Brandon Barklage =

American soccer player

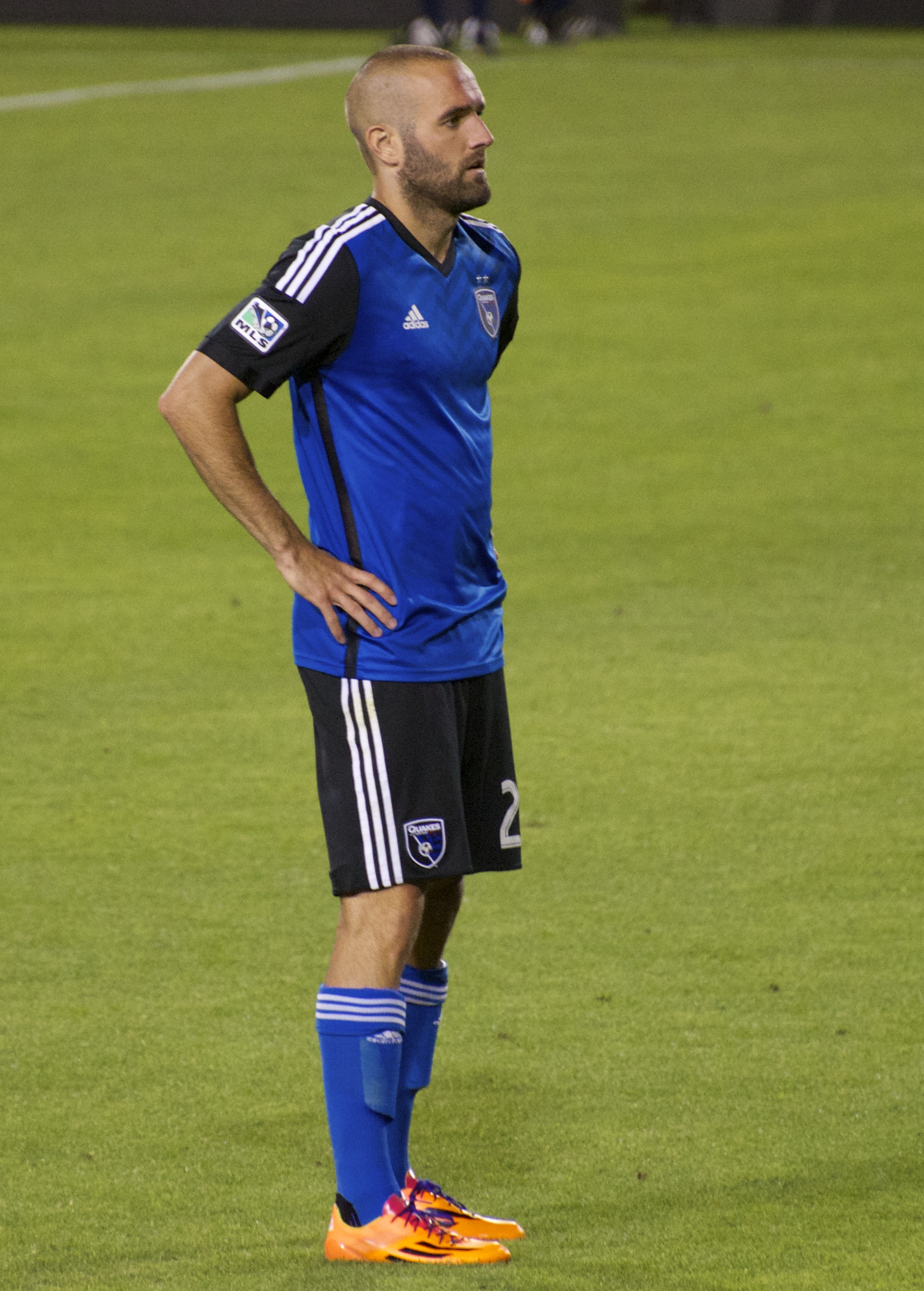

Personal information
- Date of birth: November 2, 1986 (age 39)
- Place of birth: St. Louis, Missouri, United States
- Height: 5 ft 11 in (1.80 m)
- Position: Defensive midfielder

Youth career
- 2005–2006: New Mexico Lobos
- 2007–2008: St. Louis Billikens

Senior career*
Years	Team	Apps	(Gls)
2008	Chicago Fire Premier	12	(3)
2009–2011	D.C. United	11	(0)
2012–2013	New York Red Bulls	45	(2)
2014–2015	San Jose Earthquakes	13	(0)
2015–2016	Saint Louis FC	26	(1)
- * Club domestic league appearances and goals as of October 10, 2016

Brandon Barklage (born November 2, 1986) is an American soccer player.

== Career ==
=== Youth and college ===
During Barklage's youth career he primarily played for Lou Fusz S.C. In 2004, he led Scott Gallagher to a USYSA national championship. Barklage also attended Christian Brothers College High School (CBC) in St. Louis. Barklage played college soccer at the University of New Mexico and at St. Louis University. He earned first-team All-Mountain Pacific Sports Federation honors and was named to the NSCAA All-Far West Region third team in his second year at New Mexico in 2006, and was named to the TopDrawerSoccer National Team of the Season, the NSCAA All-Mid-Atlantic Region Second Team and the Second-team All A-10 Conference in his second year at St. Louis in 2008. During his college years he also played with Chicago Fire Premier in the USL Premier Development League.

=== Professional ===
Barklage was drafted in the third round (36th overall) of the 2009 MLS SuperDraft by D.C. United. He made his professional debut on 28 March 2009, coming on as a late substitute for Christian Gomez in D.C.'s game against Chicago Fire. After struggling for playing time due to serious injury, D.C. United opted not to renew his contract at the end of the 2010 MLS season.

He went on trial with United during the 2011 pre-season to earn a contract with the club. His trial was successful and United signed Barklage on 25 March 2011. However, at season's end the club declined his 2012 contract option and he entered the 2011 MLS Re-Entry Draft. Barklage was not selected in the draft and became a free agent.

On March 5, 2012, it was announced that Barklage had agreed to terms with New York Red Bulls of Major League Soccer. Barklage quickly acclimated into his new role at right back with New York, helping the club to three consecutive clean sheets during May 2012. On June 24, 2012, Barklage scored two goals to help New York to a 3–2 victory over his former club D.C. United.

Barklage remained with New York throughout 2013 but his contract option was declined at season's end. He entered the 2013 MLS Re-Entry Draft and was selected by San Jose Earthquakes, signing with the club in January 2014. He made his Earthquakes debut against the New England Revolution on March 29, 2014. Barklage started in 10 of 13 appearances in his only season with San Jose. On March 18, 2015, Barklage and San Jose mutually agreed to terminate his contract.

Days later, Saint Louis FC of the USL announced the signing of the St. Louis native for the 2015 USL season. “It’s going to be great to get home and represent my hometown as a member of Saint Louis FC,” Barklage said. “I’ve been in talks with the club for the past month or so, and they’ve treated my family and I with nothing but respect.”

== Honors ==
=== Club ===
New York Red Bulls

- MLS Supporters' Shield: 2013

== Club career statistics ==
All-Time Club Performances
Club	Season	USL PDL		Playoffs		Open Cup		CONCACAF		Total
Club	Season	App	Goals	App	Goals	App	Goals	App	Goals	App	Goals
Chicago Fire Premier (USL PDL)	2008	12	3	1	0	0	0	0	0	13	3
Chicago Fire Premier (USL PDL)	Club Total	12	3	1	0	0	0	0	0	13	3
Club	Season	MLS		Playoffs		Open Cup		CONCACAF		Total
Club	Season	App	Goals	App	Goals	App	Goals	App	Goals	App	Goals
D.C. United (MLS)	2009	4	0	-	-	4	2	-	-	8	2
D.C. United (MLS)	2010	3	0	-	-	1	0	-	-	4	0
D.C. United (MLS)	2011	4	0	-	-	2	0	-	-	6	0
D.C. United (MLS)	Club Total	11	0	-	-	7	2	-	-	18	2
New York Red Bulls (MLS)	2012	19	2	-	-	2	0	-	-	21	2
New York Red Bulls (MLS)	2013	26	0	2	0	2	0	-	-	30	0
New York Red Bulls (MLS)	Club Total	45	2	2	0	4	0	-	-	51	2
San Jose Earthquakes (MLS)	2014	13	0	0	0	0	0	1	0	14	0
San Jose Earthquakes (MLS)	Club Total	13	0	0	0	0	0	1	0	14	0
Career totals		81	5	3	0	11	2	1	0	96	7
Last updated June 28, 2014
