= Chad Vandegriffe =

American soccer and indoor soccer player (born 1989)

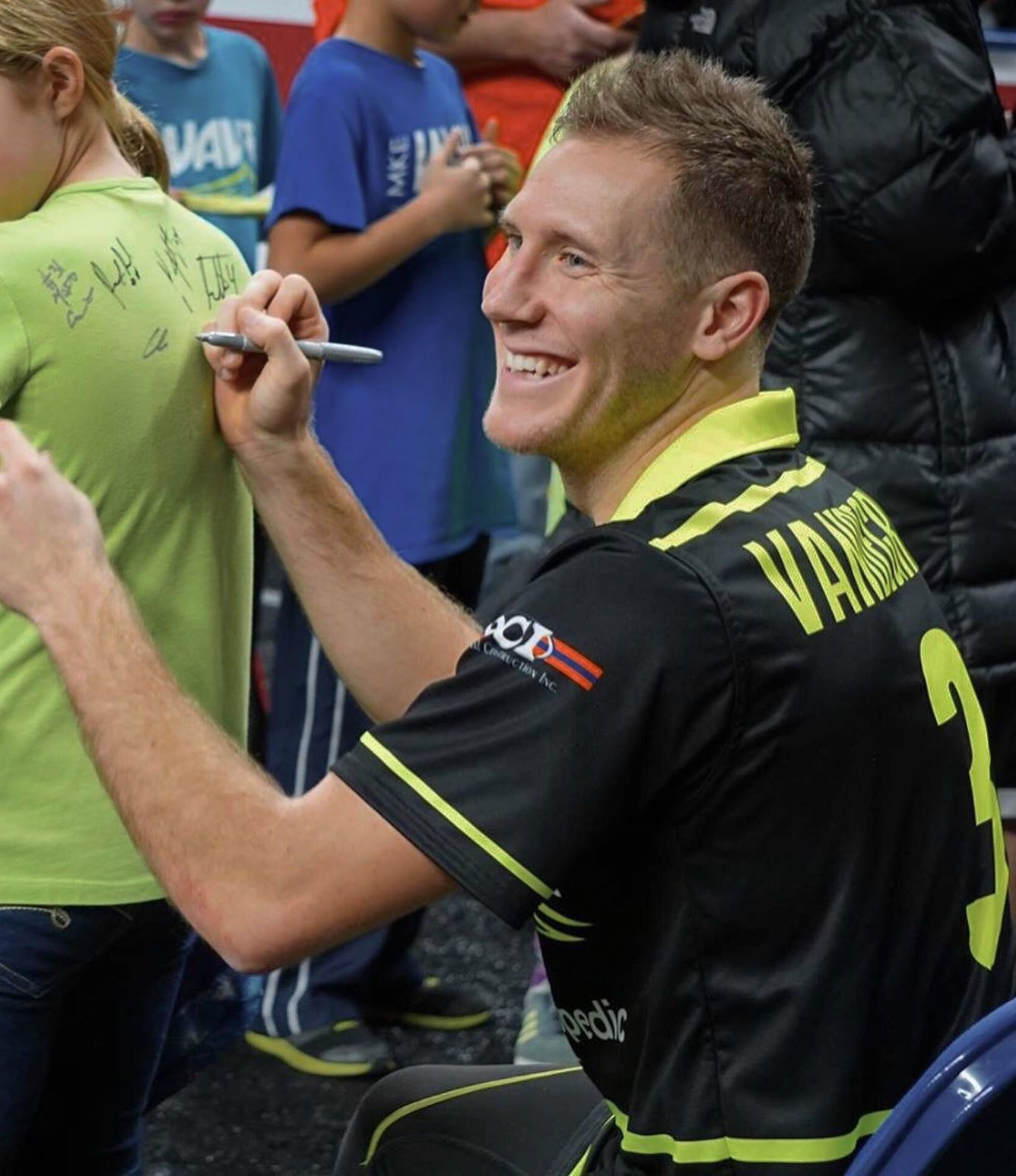
- Vandegriffe with Milwaukee Wave c. 2017

Personal information
- Full name: Chad Alexander Vandegriffe
- Date of birth: November 24, 1989 (age 36)
- Place of birth: St. Louis, Missouri, United States
- Height: 6 ft 1 in (1.85 m)
- Position: Defender

Team information
- Current team: Kansas City Comets
- Number: 4

Youth career
- 2004–2007: Chaminade Red Devils
- –2007: St. Louis Scott Gallagher

College career
Years	Team	Apps	(Gls)
2008–2009	SMU Mustangs	25	(0)
2010–2011	Saint Louis Billikens	36	(3)

Senior career*
Years	Team	Apps	(Gls)
2013–2016	St. Louis Ambush (indoor)	52	(13)
2015–2016	Saint Louis FC	22	(0)
2016–2020	Milwaukee Wave (indoor)	86	(19)
2020–2023	Florida Tropics (indoor)	71	(8)
2023–	Kansas City Comets (indoor)	52	(9)
Total		283	(49)

International career
2022–	United States Minifootball	14	(1)
- * Club domestic league appearances and goals as of April 12, 2025

Chad Vandegriffe (born November 24, 1989) is an American soccer and indoor soccer player who currently plays for the Kansas City Comets in the Major Arena Soccer League.

== Youth ==
Prior to turning pro, Vandegriffe was a standout at Chaminade College Preparatory School, where he was a four-year letter winner, team captain and Defensive Player of the Year. He helped lead the school to the Missouri Class 3 state championship in 2006. Other accolades include first-team all-Midwest, first-team all-state, first-team All-Metro Catholic Conference, and he was named to Great Midwest Classic All-Tournament Team. He also lettered in baseball and basketball.

Vandegriffe played club soccer with St. Louis Scott Gallagher Soccer Club, where he helped lead his team to Missouri state championships in 2005, 2006 and 2007 prior to playing in the U.S. Soccer Development Academy. He was a U-23 regional champion and national runner-up in 2011.

== College ==
Vandegriffe played two years of college soccer at Southern Methodist University in 2008 and 2009, before transferring to Saint Louis University in 2010.

Vandegriffe made the Atlantic 10 Conference all-tournament team in 2010 and earned honorable mention, Atlantic 10 Conference, in 2011.

== Professional ==
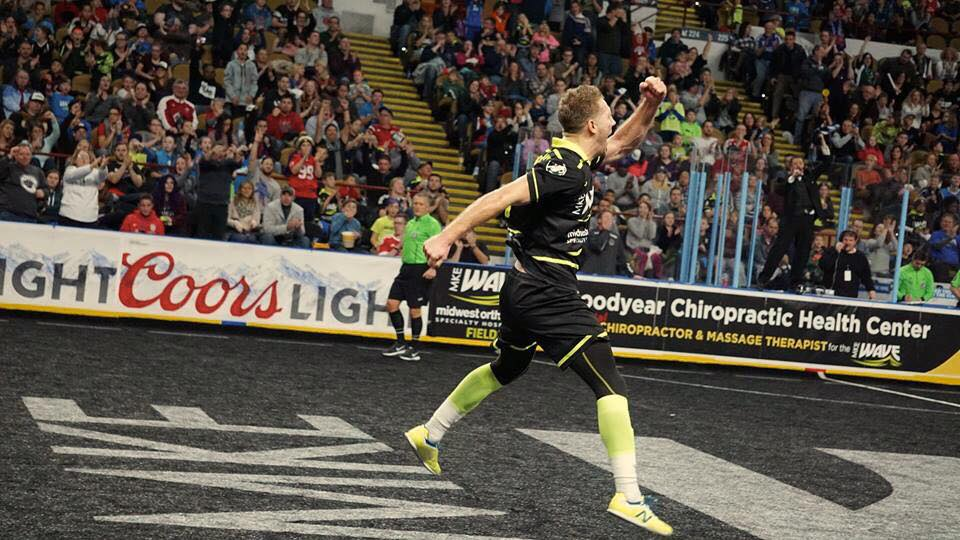
Vandegriffe playing for Milwaukee Wave c. 2017

After playing with the St. Louis Ambush in the Major Indoor Soccer League, then in the Major Arena Soccer League in 2014–15, Vandegriffe signed with United Soccer League expansion club Saint Louis FC on March 13, 2015.

On June 16, 2015, Vandegriffe played Sporting Kansas City in the Lamar Hunt U.S. Open Cup. Ultimately losing 1–0 on a header from Graham Zusi in front of a crowd of 19,298 at Children's Mercy Park.

After the USL season concluded, the Ambush announced that Vandegriffe would be returning to the team for the 2015–16 season.

On December 23, 2015, Saint Louis FC announced a number of players would be returning for the 2016 season, including Vandegriffe.

On October 3, 2016, the Milwaukee Wave announced the signing of Vandegriffe for the 2016–17 Major Arena Soccer League season. On June 30, 2017, the Wave announced that he had re-signed for three seasons.

Vandegriffe and the Milwaukee Wave won the 2018-19 Major Arena Soccer League Championship. The Wave defeated the Monterrey Flash 5–2 in front of 7,901 fans at the UW-Milwaukee Panther Arena on May 5, 2019.

Vandegriffe signed a two-year contract with Florida Tropics SC on July 23, 2020. Vandegriffe, the 2021-22 Major Arena Soccer League Defender of the Year re-signed with the Florida Tropics on June 29, 2022. Vandegriffe, who led the MASL in blocks last season with 54, inked a new three-year contract with the club.

On July 12, 2023, the MASL announced that the Florida Tropics suspended operations. As a result of the suspension Vandegriffe's contract was voided and he became a free agent.

On July 19, 2023, the Kansas City Comets signed Vandegriffe to a three-year contract.

== United States Minifootball ==
Vandegriffe represents the United States men's national minifootball team in six-a-side and indoor soccer. Both compete in the World Minifootball Federation.

On May 8, 2023, Vandegriffe and the United States won the 2023 EMF Nations Games Championship in Galanta, Slovakia. The United States defeated Hungary, Bulgaria, Romania, and Hungary once again in the final.

He also represented the United States during the 2023 WMF World Cup in Ras Al Khaimah playing against Spain, Sudan, Romania, and Czech Republic. He scored his first international goal against Spain on October 26, 2023.

== The Soccer Tournament ==
Vandegriffe played with Sneaky Fox FC in The Soccer Tournament on June 1–4, 2023. His coaches and teammates included the likes of Mike Magee (soccer), Kyle Martino, Nick Rimando, Alan Gordon (soccer), Jay DeMerit, Brad Evans (soccer), Quincy Amarikwa, and Steven Lenhart. Sneaky Fox FC lost in the semi-final to Newtown Pride FC, who would go on to win the $1 million winner-take-all prize.

Vandegriffe played with Tranqui10 FC in The Soccer Tournament on June 5-10, 2024.

== Honors ==
St. Louis Ambush

- Major Indoor Soccer League - All-Rookie Team: 2013-14

Milwaukee Wave

- Major Arena Soccer League - Champions: 2018–19

Florida Tropics

- Major Arena Soccer League - Regular Season Champions: 2021
- Major Arena Soccer League - All-Third Team: 2021
- Major Arena Soccer League - “Elite Six” All-First Team: 2021-22
- Major Arena Soccer League - Defender of the Year: 2021-22
- Major Arena Soccer League - Finalists: 2021-22
- Major Arena Soccer League - “Elite Six” All-First Team: 2022-23

United States national minifootball team

- World Minifootball Federation - EMF Nations Games Champions: 2023

Kansas City Comets

- Major Arena Soccer League - "Honorable Mention" All-Third Team: 2023-24
- Major Arena Soccer League - Finalists: 2023-24
- Major Arena Soccer League - All-Star: 2025
