= Jamiel Hardware =

Jamaican footballer (born 1992)

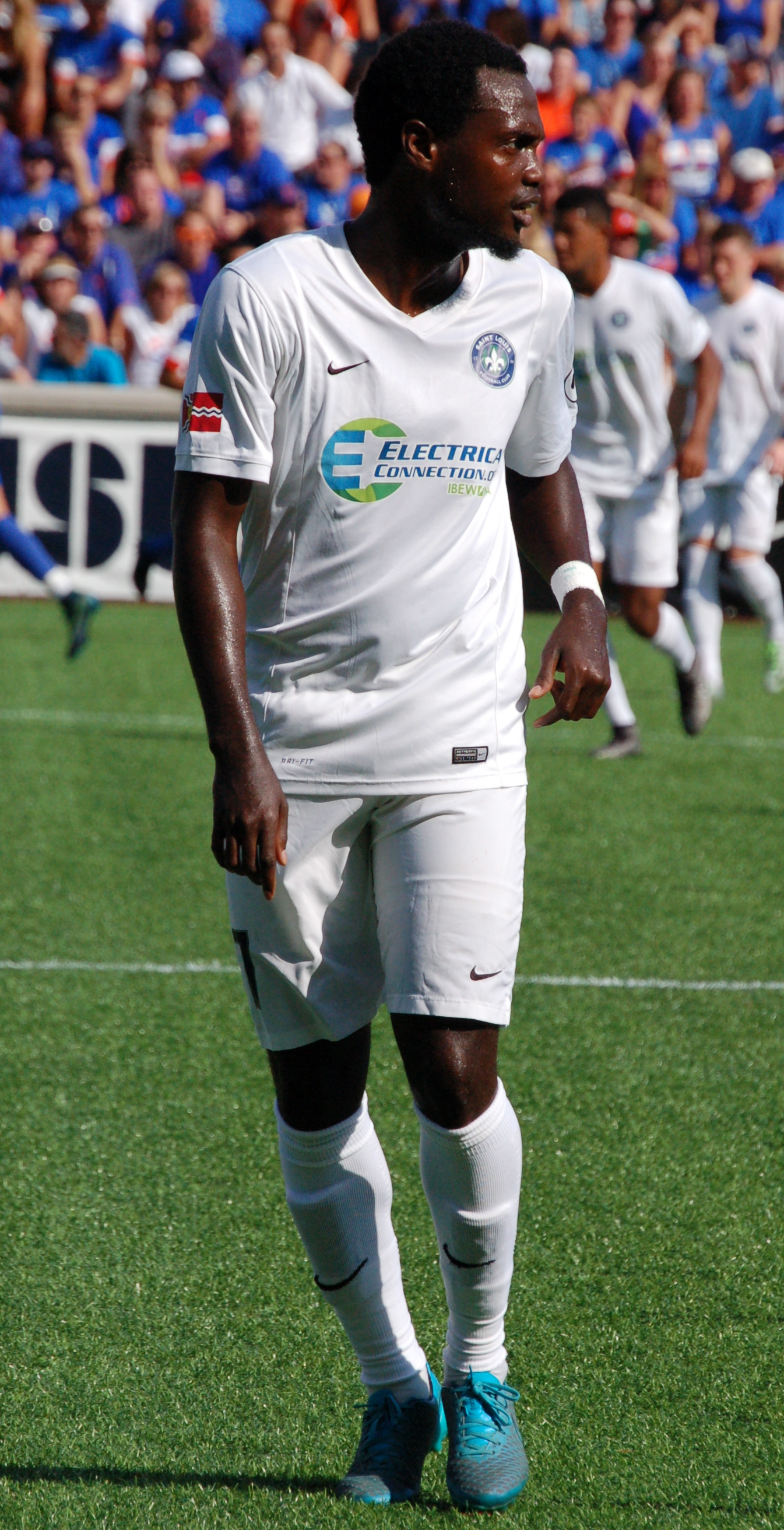
- Hardware playing for Saint Louis FC in 2016

Personal information
- Full name: Jamiel Kevon Hardware
- Date of birth: 12 March 1992 (age 34)
- Place of birth: Jamaica
- Height: 5 ft 7 in (1.70 m)
- Position: Midfielder

Team information
- Current team: Mount Pleasant
- Number: 7

Youth career
- 2010–2011: Boys' Town
- 2011–2012: Jefferson Vikings

Senior career*
Years	Team	Apps	(Gls)
2012	Ventura County Fusion	11	(2)
2012	Motala AIF	7	(1)
2013–2014	Harrisburg City Islanders	44	(4)
2015–2016	Saint Louis FC	48	(6)
2017–2018	Boys' Town	28	(9)
2018–2019	Arnett Gardens	26	(4)
2019–	Mount Pleasant	15	(2)

International career^{‡}
2017–	Jamaica	3	(2)
- * Club domestic league appearances and goals as of 10 January 2018 ‡ National team caps and goals as of 7 November 2017

Jamiel Kevon Hardware (born 12 March 1992) is a Jamaican footballer who currently plays for the Jamaica National Premier League Arnett Gardens F.C.

== Career ==
=== Club ===
After a short spell with USL PDL club Ventura County Fusion, Hardware played with the Harrisburg City Islanders in the USL Pro for the 2013 and 2014 seasons.

On 7 March 2015, it was announced that Hardware had signed with USL expansion side Saint Louis FC.

In August 2018, Hardware transferred to Arnett Gardens F.C.

=== International ===
Hardware made his senior international debut in 2017.

== Statistics ==
=== International goals ===
Scores and results list Jamaica's goal tally first.

No	Date	Venue	Opponent	Score	Result	Competition
1.	24 August 2017	Hasely Crawford Stadium, Port of Spain, Trinidad and Tobago	Trinidad and Tobago	1–0	2–0	Friendly
2.	7 October 2017	King Abdullah Sports City, Jeddah, Saudi Arabia	Saudi Arabia	1–1	2–5	Friendly
