= Fabio Morelli =

Swiss footballer (born 1995)

Personal information
- Full name: Fabio Livio Morelli
- Date of birth: 14 March 1995 (age 31)
- Place of birth: Neuchâtel, Switzerland
- Height: 1.75 m (5 ft 9 in)
- Positions: Winger; forward

Team information
- Current team: Bavois
- Number: 11

Youth career
- 2006–2013: Neuchâtel Xamax
- 2013–2015: Montreal Impact

Senior career*
| Years | Team | Apps | (Gls) |
| 2015–2016 | FC Montreal | 26 | (2) |
| 2016–2017 | SC YF Juventus | 26 | (5) |
| 2018–2019 | Köniz | 31 | (10) |
| 2019–2022 | Yverdon | 29 | (6) |
| 2022 | → Biel-Bienne (loan) | 11 | (6) |
| 2022 | Biel-Bienne | 18 | (1) |
| 2023– | Bavois | 60 | (8) |
- * Club domestic league appearances and goals as of 1 October 2026

Fabio Livio Morelli (born 14 March 1995) is a Swiss footballer who plays for Bavois.

== Career ==
Morelli spent seven seasons with the Neuchâtel Xamax youth academy before joining the Montreal Impact Academy from 2013 to 2015. On 13 March 2015, it was announced that Morelli would join FC Montreal, a USL affiliate club of the Montreal Impact for their inaugural season. He made his professional debut for the club on 28 March in a 2–0 defeat to Toronto FC II.

In February 2022, Morelli moved to Biel-Bienne on loan. In July 2022, the transfer was made permanent.
