= Charles Renken =

American soccer player

Personal information
- Full name: Charles Bimbe
- Date of birth: December 19, 1993 (age 32)
- Place of birth: Kalingalinga, Zambia
- Height: 1.70 m (5 ft 7 in)
- Position: Midfielder

Youth career
- 2007–2009: IMG Academy
- 2009–2010: Vancouver Whitecaps
- 2010–2011: 1899 Hoffenheim

Senior career*
Years	Team	Apps	(Gls)
2012	Portland Timbers	0	(0)
2013	Gimo IF FK		
2014	Arizona United	9	(0)
2015–2016	Saint Louis FC	34	(1)
2017	Seattle Sounders FC 2	19	(1)
2018	FC Columbus	8	(1)

International career
2007–2011	United States U20		
- * Club domestic league appearances and goals as of 25 June 2018 (UTC)

Charles Bimbe-Renken (born December 19, 1993) is an American former soccer player.

== Early life ==
He was born as Charles Bimbe in the suburbs of Lusaka, Zambia. He moved to the United States in 2003 to live with the Renken family in Edwardsville, Illinois, and was officially adopted by the Renkens in 2005. Renken grew up in the soccer hotbed of Saint Louis, where he played on a number of local youth teams. As a 10-year-old, he dominated his local under-14 league.

== Career ==
=== Youth ===
Renken spent time with various U.S. youth teams. Renken played with the U-14 national team at the age of 11 in 2005, and at the age of 12 he played with the U-15 national team in 2006. He joined the U.S. Soccer under-17 academy in Bradenton, Florida in 2007 at the age of 13. By the age of 14, Renken was hyped by the soccer media as "U.S. soccer's next rising star" and was often compared to Freddy Adu.

=== Professional ===
Renken was scouted by some of the biggest clubs in Europe, including English giants Manchester United and Liverpool. Renken signed with German club TSG 1899 Hoffenheim alongside teammate Joe Gyau, moving to the Vancouver Whitecaps academy until his 18th birthday. Renken played 10 matches for TSG 1899 Hoffenheim's U19 team. Renken never made a first-team appearance with Hoffenheim, however, due to a series of knee injuries, and left the club.

Renken signed for the 2012 season with the Portland Timbers via the MLS waiver process. He played in all ten of the Timbers' reserve league matches, but didn't make a first team appearance and was waived on November 19, 2012.

Renken trialed with numerous clubs in Sweden but failed to sign with any, until signing with 7th-tier club Gimo IF FK, who he helped to promote to Sweden's 6th division.

In April 2014, Renken signed with USL Pro club Arizona United.

On January 20, 2015, it was announced that Renken had returned home to St. Louis and signed with USL expansion club Saint Louis FC. On November 9, 2016, Saint Louis FC released Renken.

On May 26, 2017, Renken signed with USL club Seattle Sounders FC 2. He made his first appearance on May 28, 2017, in a 2–2 draw against Sacramento Republic.

For 2018 he joined NPSL side FC Columbus, late in the season.
