= Magnus Rasmussen =

Danish footballer (born 1993)

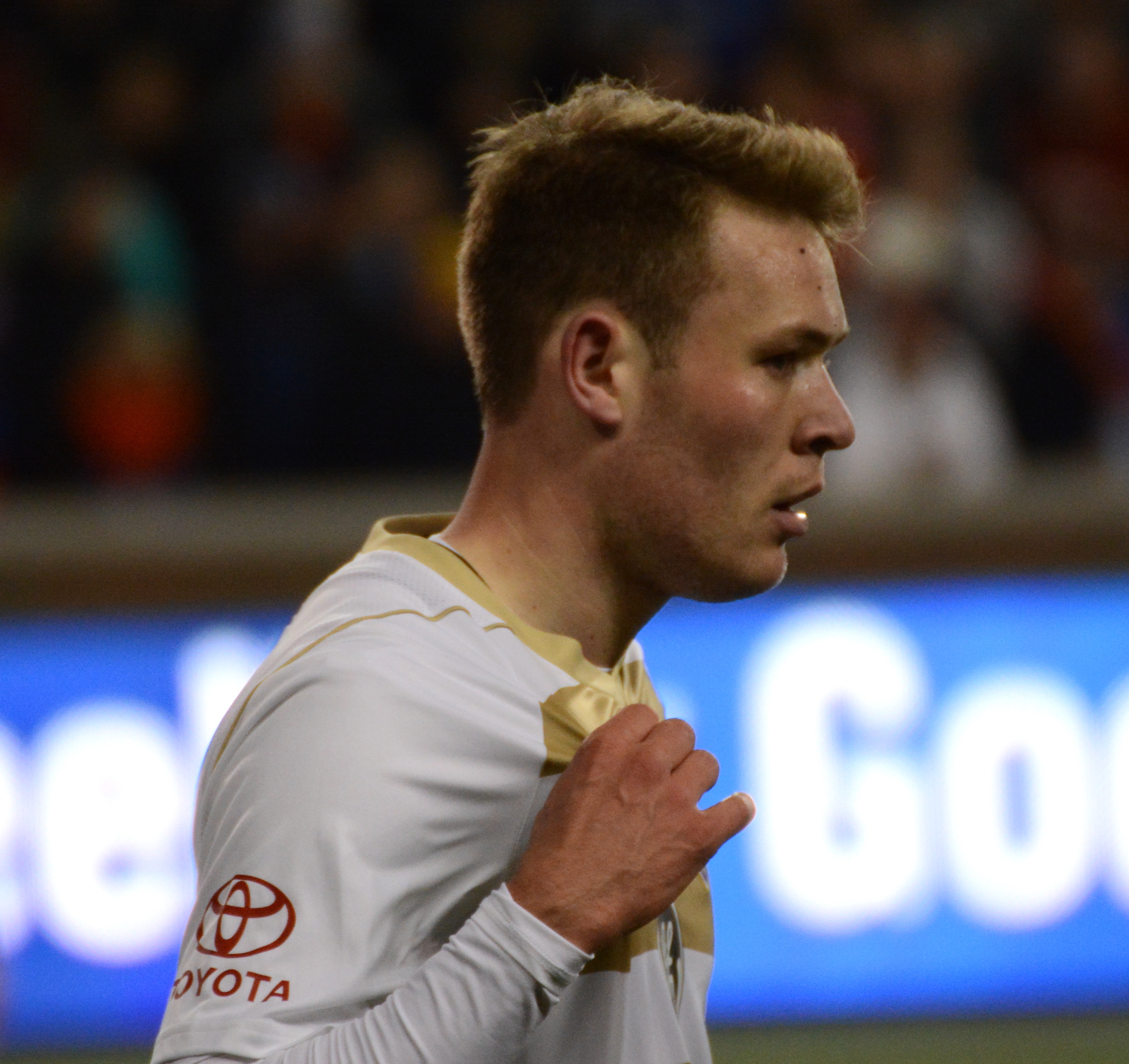
- Rasmussen playing for Louisville City in 2018

Personal information
- Full name: Magnus Worziger Klein Rasmussen
- Date of birth: 18 April 1993 (age 33)
- Place of birth: Copenhagen, Denmark
- Height: 6 ft 1 in (1.85 m)
- Position: Winger

Youth career
- 2007–2008: BSV
- 2008–2012: Nordsjælland

Senior career*
Years	Team	Apps	(Gls)
2012–2015	BSV	13	(1)
2015–2016	Louisville City	40	(11)
2017	BK Frem	7	(0)
2018–2020	Louisville City	52	(14)
- * Club domestic league appearances and goals as of 23 October 2019

Magnus Worziger Klein Rasmussen (born 18 April 1993) is a Danish footballer.

== Career ==
Rasmussen came up through the youth academy of Nordsjælland, before moving to Danish second-division BSV in 2013.

Rasmussen signed with USL side Louisville City FC on 12 February 2015. Rasmussen scored Louisville City's first ever competitive goal against Saint Louis FC in the opening game on 28 March 2015. He totaled eight goals and four assists in LouCity's inaugural season.

In June 2016, he returned to the field after seven months of recovery from hip labral tear surgery. He rejoined the starting lineup in August. He made the USL Team of the Week twice with his first three goals.

After spending the 2017 season with the Danish side BK Frem, Rasmussen returned to Louisville City FC for the 2018 season. On 31 July 2020, Louisville and Rasmussen mutually agreed to terminate his contract, allowing Rasmussen to remain overseas during the COVID-19 pandemic, but with the option to have him return to the club for their 2021 season.

== Honours ==
=== Club ===
Louisville City FC

- USL Cup (1): 2018

=== Individual ===
- USL All League First Team: 2019
