= Bryan Gaul =

American soccer player

Personal information
- Date of birth: August 10, 1989 (age 37)
- Place of birth: Naperville, Illinois, United States
- Height: 6 ft 5 in (1.96 m)
- Positions: Defender; midfielder

Youth career
- 2008–2011: Bradley Braves

Senior career*
Years	Team	Apps	(Gls)
2010	GPS Portland Phoenix	14	(0)
2012–2013	LA Galaxy	14	(0)
	→ Carolina RailHawks (loan)	7	(0)
2015	Saint Louis FC	27	(4)
2016	Bahlinger SC	10	(3)
2016–2017	Kickers Offenbach	34	(1)
2017–2018	SV Elversberg	30	(0)
2018–2019	FSV Zwickau	16	(0)
- * Club domestic league appearances and goals as of 21:55, 28 July 2019 (UTC)

Bryan Gaul (born August 10, 1989, in Naperville, Illinois) is an American soccer player who most recently played for FSV Zwickau in the 3. Liga.

== Career ==
=== College and amateur ===
Gaul played college soccer for Bradley University between 2008 and 2011. During his time at Bradley, Gaul was named NSCAA All-Midwest Region and All-Missouri Valley Conference in 2011. In 2010 Gaul was named All-Missouri Valley Conference in his first year as a forward, after converting from a midfielder.

=== Professional ===
Gaul was selected by the LA Galaxy in the first round (19th overall) of the 2012 MLS Supplemental Draft. He made his debut for the club on May 2 against Seattle Sounders FC. Gaul made 14 appearances in 2012, along with 7 starts and notched an assist.

After loan stints in 2013 with NASL clubs Fort Lauderdale Strikers and Carolina RailHawks, Gaul was waived by the Galaxy on in the 2014 preseason.

Gaul had signed with USL club Saint Louis FC ahead of the 2015 season. He tied for the team high in both goals (4) and assists (4) during the 2015 regular season, and was the team's leading scorer overall that year with 6 goals, adding a pair of goals during U.S. Open Cup play.

==== Germany ====
In January 2016, Gaul moved to Germany and signed with Bahlinger SC of the Regionalliga Südwest. He moved to Kickers Offenbach for the 2016–17 season before signing with SV Elversberg ahead of the 2017–18 campaign.

On May 29, 2018, it was announced that Gaul moved up to the 3. Liga, signing a two-year contract with FSV Zwickau on a free transfer. He left the club at the end of the 2018/19 season.

== Honors ==
=== Club ===
Los Angeles Galaxy

- MLS Cup (1): 2012

== Personal life ==
In December 2018, he married Andreea Cristina Bolbea, a lifestyle blogger, model, and internet personality that has amassed over 900,000 followers on Instagram. She was born June 7, 1987, in Bucharest, Romania.

He received enormous backlash after it came out that this wife had been romantically involved with Dan Bilzerian.
