= Nate Polak =

American soccer player (born 1989)

Personal information
- Full name: Nathan Polak
- Date of birth: September 5, 1989 (age 37)
- Place of birth: Lincoln, Nebraska, United States
- Height: 6 ft 2 in (1.88 m)
- Position: Forward

College career
Years	Team	Apps	(Gls)
2008	Drake Bulldogs		
2009–2011	Hastings Broncos		

Senior career*
Years	Team	Apps	(Gls)
2012–2014	Minnesota United FC	8	(1)
2014	→ Oklahoma City Energy (loan)	6	(0)
2015	Louisville City	23	(1)
- * Club domestic league appearances and goals as of September 7, 2015

Nathan Polak (born September 5, 1989) is an American soccer player.

== Career ==
Born in Lincoln, Nebraska, Polak played college soccer at Drake University in 2008 and then transferred to Hastings College between 2009 and 2011.

Polak had a much decorated career for the Broncos as he was a two-time first team all-league selection and the 2011 GPAC Offensive Player-of-the-Year. He went on to be selected as a First Team NAIA All-American in 2011. Twice in 2011 he was named NAIA National Player-of-the-Week.

In is junior year Hastings won the NAIA National Championship, while as a senior they were the NAIA National Runner-Up. He was named to the NAIA All-Tournament Team in both seasons (2010 and 2011).

On January 17, 2012, Polak was selected in the fourth round (no. 69 overall) of the 2012 MLS Supplemental Draft by New York Red Bulls. However, he wasn't signed by the club.

Polak signed his first professional contract with NASL club Minnesota Stars FC on August 15, 2012. He scored his first professional goal for the Stars less than one month later, on September 11, 2012, against the Puerto Rico Islanders in his first ever starting appearance.

== Personal ==
Nate is brother of Tyler Polak, who also plays for Greenville Triumph SC.
