= Jermie Dwayne Lynch =

Jamaican footballer (born 1991)

Jermie Lynch
Personal information
- Full name: Jermie Dwayne Lynch
- Date of birth: 24 March 1991 (age 35)
- Place of birth: Kingston, Jamaica
- Height: 1.86 m (6 ft 1 in)
- Position: Striker

Team information
- Current team: Hồ Chí Minh City
- Number: 91

Senior career*
Years	Team	Apps	(Gls)
2011–2014	Harbour View	48	(15)
2013–2014	→ Luis Ángel Firpo (loan)	7	(1)
2015–2016	Saint Louis FC	24	(4)
2016	→ Wilmington Hammerheads (loan)	9	(1)
2017–2018	Portmore United FC	44	(11)
2018	Sông Lam Nghệ An	10	(4)
2019–2021	Hải Phòng	25	(11)
2020	→ Than Quảng Ninh (loan)	14	(8)
2021–2023	Topenland Bình Định	21	(11)
2025	Portmore United FC	8	(3)
2025–2026	Văn Hiến University	6	(2)
2026–	Hồ Chí Minh City	15	(8)

International career^{‡}
2012	Jamaica	1	(1)
- * Club domestic league appearances and goals as of 24 October 2026 ‡ National team caps and goals as of 17:38, 6 March 2019 (UTC)

Jermie Dwayne Lynch (born 24 March 1991) is a Jamaican professional footballer who plays as a striker for the V.League 2 club Hồ Chí Minh City. In 2012 he made his only appearance for the Jamaica national team.

== Early life ==
Born to Jamaican parents, Lynch began playing football at an early age. He has been a supporter of Chelsea since childhood. He is a Christian.

== Club career ==
Lynch began his career with Harbour View. In July 2013, Lynch went on trial with El Salvadorian club Luis Ángel Firpo, before signing a loan deal with the club a few days later.

Lynch signed with USL expansion side Saint Louis FC in March 2015. He scored the club's first ever regular-season goal during a match against the Tulsa Roughnecks at ONEOK Field on 2 April 2015.

On 28 July 2016, Lynch was loaned to the Wilmington Hammerheads of the USL for the remainder of the season, and his contract, after struggling to earn playing time with the first team at Saint Louis FC. In his first game at his new club he scored a goal in a 4–1 loss to the Pittsburgh Riverhounds.

Lynch was released by Saint Louis FC on 9 November 2016.

== International career ==
Lynch made his international debut for Jamaica in 2012.

=== International goals ===
Scores and results list Jamaica's goal tally first.

No	Date	Venue	Opponent	Score	Result	Competition
1.	18 May 2012	Montego Bay Sports Complex, Montego Bay, Jamaica	Guyana	1–0	1–0	Friendly

== Honours ==
=== Club ===
Topenland Bình Định

- Vietnamese National Cup runners-up: 2022
