= World Wide Technology Soccer Park =

Soccer stadium in Fenton, Missouri

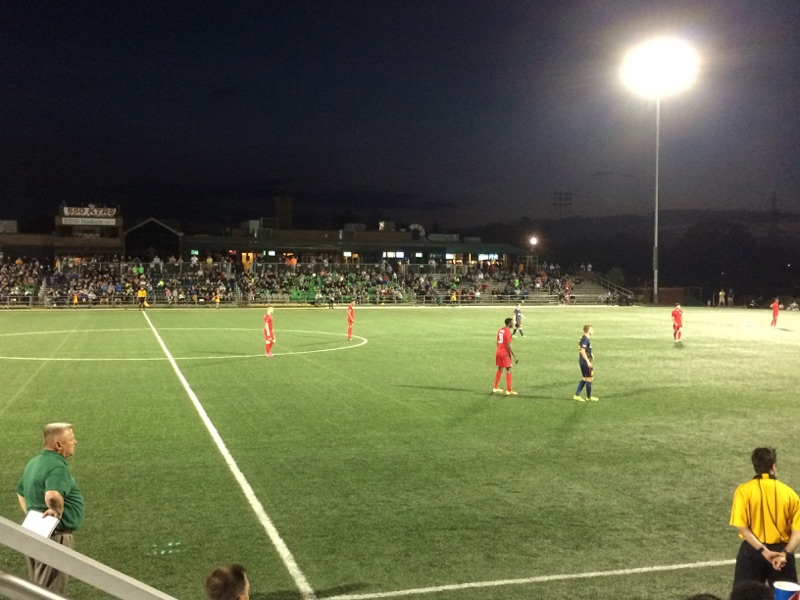
- The stadium during a match in 2015
- Interactive map of World Wide Technology; Soccer Park
- Former names: Anheuser-Busch Center; St. Louis Soccer Park
- Address: 1 Soccer Park Road; Fenton, Missouri; United States
- Coordinates: 38°32′50″N 90°26′20″W
- Owner: St. Louis Scott Gallagher SC
- Operator: St. Louis Scott Gallagher SC
- Capacity: 5,500
- Type: Soccer-specific stadium
- Surface: Turf (main stadium field and 3 other fields, 2 grass fields)

Construction
- Opened: 1982; 44 years ago

Tenants
- St. Louis Scott Gallagher SC (2011–present); Webster University Gorloks (2012–present); Saint Louis Athletica (WPS) (2009–2010); AC St. Louis (D2 Pro League) (2010); Saint Louis FC (USLC) (2015–2020)

Website
- slsgsoccer.com/facilities

World Wide Technology Soccer Park is a soccer complex which includes four soccer-specific stadiums, with the main field, "West Community Stadium", holding 5,500 seats. Located in Fenton, Missouri, United States, a suburb southwest of downtown St. Louis, it is owned and operated by St. Louis Scott Gallagher Soccer Club whose 275 teams and 3,600 players use it for both practice and games.

It is also the home field for Webster University's men's and women's soccer teams and was the home of Saint Louis FC from 2015-2020. The complex has five playing fields—three turf and two grass—and one main exhibition turf field, most of which are lighted. The fields are primarily used for soccer but also host field hockey and lacrosse teams. In addition to the playing surfaces, the complex features offices, home and away locker rooms, a fan shop, a banquet hall, a veranda overlooking the main field, two concession stands, a press box, and a private office.

Saint Louis FC of the USL Championship previously played at World Wide Technology Soccer Park from 2014-2019, which averaged 4,532 fans per game in 2019., before ceasing operations in 2020 with the upcoming MLS expansion in St. Louis.

== History ==
=== Opening and Anheuser-Busch ===
The "St. Louis Soccer Park" opened in 1982 with funding from Anheuser-Busch who outright purchased it in 1985 and renamed it the Anheuser-Busch Center. During the Anheuser-Busch ownership, the main exhibition field, known as West Community Stadium since August 2019, was opened and capable of seating 5,500 spectators, for hosting international, collegiate and youth soccer competitions.

August Busch IV, the former CEO of Anheuser-Busch, who disliked going to Anheuser-Busch's headquarters, renovated a portion of the Soccer Park offices complete with his own luxurious and secluded office that includes a private bathroom (formerly soccer club coaches offices with a shower) and conference room. During Anheuser-Busch's takeover by Belgium beer maker InBev, the board and executives of Anheuser-Busch met in August's conference room at the Soccer Park. At one point during the takeover proceedings, August said "My war room is the Soccer Park" describing the frantic effort of the executives to save Anheuser-Busch from being sold.

=== St. Louis Soccer United ===
In March 2009, Anheuser-Busch wrote a letter of intent to transfer ownership of Soccer Park to Jeff Cooper and his organization St. Louis Soccer United (SLSU) in order to strengthen SLSU's bid for a Major League Soccer expansion team. While the MLS bid failed, SLSU announced in May that Saint Louis Athletica, the Women's Professional Soccer team also run by SLSU, would play the rest of their home games at Soccer Park, having previously played at Ralph Korte Stadium on the campus of SIUE. In the summer of 2011, Jeff Cooper and SLSU sold the soccer park to St. Louis Scott Gallagher, a local soccer club. Jeff Cooper originally received a bid for the Soccer Park from a non-soccer organization but this news spread to World Wide Technology executives Jim Kavanaugh and Tom Strunk who, in an effort to keep soccer strong in St. Louis, personally financed the deal - estimated at $1.9 million - on behalf of St. Louis Scott Gallagher.

=== Current ownership ===
In March 2012, St. Louis Scott Gallagher broke ground on a $1.5 million renovation after it signed a partnership with Webster University and received sponsorship from Nike, Windows Mobile and Wells Fargo in addition to a considerable donation from World Wide Technology, who had a number of executives play soccer at SLU. The renovations included replacing the main exhibition field and another grass field with turf, replanting the two remaining grass fields with Bermuda grass, replacing the out dated scoreboard with a state-of-the-art video board and sound system, and converting one of the coaches' conference rooms into a first-class Team Pro Shop.

== International games ==
Date	Competition	Team	Res	Team	Attendance
30 May 1987	1988 Summer Olympics qualification	United States	3–0	Canada	
5 September 1987	1988 Summer Olympics qualification	United States	4–1	Trinidad and Tobago	
13 August 1988	1990 FIFA World Cup Qualification	United States	5–1	Jamaica	6,100
30 April 1989	1990 FIFA World Cup Qualification	United States	1–0	Costa Rica	
5 November 1989	1990 FIFA World Cup Qualification	United States	0–0	El Salvador	8,600
4 April 1990	Friendly	United States	4–0	Iceland	8,000
30 September 1990	Friendly	United States	2–0	MISL Select XI	2,857

== See also ==
- Soccer in St. Louis
