= Saint Louis FC =

- Full name: Saint Louis Football Club
- Founded: May 1, 2014
- Dissolved: October 17, 2020 (5 years ago)
- Stadium: West Community Stadium; Fenton, Missouri
- Capacity: 5,500
- Owner: SLSG Pro LLC
- CEO: Jim Kavanaugh
- Head coach: Steve Trittschuh
- League: USL Championship
- 2020: 8th, Eastern Conference; Playoffs: Semifinals
| Home colors | Away colors |

Saint Louis FC was an American professional soccer team based in St. Louis, Missouri. The team was founded in May 2014, and competed in the USL Championship. The team played their matches at West Community Stadium, a venue inside the World Wide Technology Soccer Park.

== History ==
SLSG Pro LLC (affiliated with St. Louis area youth club St. Louis Scott Gallagher) was awarded the USL Pro franchise on May 1, 2014. That same day, the club announced that they would play their home games at the 5,500 seat World Wide Technology Soccer Park in Fenton, Missouri. Dale Schilly, the youth club director of SLSG, was named head coach.

On June 2, 2014, it was announced that the team's name was Saint Louis Football Club.

Former AC St. Louis player Mike Ambersley was the first player signed to the team on January 13, 2015.

On January 16, 2015, the team announced their affiliation with the Chicago Fire of Major League Soccer.

St. Louis FC played their inaugural game on March 28, 2015, losing to Louisville City 2–0. Their first victory was against the Tulsa Roughnecks on April 2, 2015, winning 2–0. Jeremie Lynch scored the team's first ever goal in the 42nd minute. Their home debut was a 1–1 draw against the Pittsburgh Riverhounds on April 11, 2015, before of a sellout crowd of 5,280. The team's first home win came against the Wilmington Hammerheads on May 9, 2015, with the winning goal by Sam Fink.

On May 16, 2016, Saint Louis FC announced that they had acquired the PDL team Springfield Synergy FC and renamed the team as Saint Louis FC U-23. On August 15, 2016, Saint Louis FC announced that Dale Schilly had been relieved of coaching duties; Tim Leonard was named as interim head coach. On October 12, 2016, Saint Louis FC introduced Preki as the new head coach.

On February 15, 2017, Saint Louis FC and the Chicago Fire did not renew their affiliation for the 2017 season. On November 19, 2017, the club announced that Preki and the club were parting ways by mutual agreement. Anthony Pulis joined the team from Orlando City B to take over the role of head coach the next day.

On August 25, 2020, citing the financial impact of the COVID-19 pandemic during 2020, and because of the MLS expansion on the way to St. Louis, it was announced that the 2020 season would be the final season of operation for the club.

== Supporters ==
The official supporters group of Saint Louis FC was the St. Louligans. The St. Louligans were founded in 2010 when several local soccer fan groups joined forces at AC St. Louis home games. These small groups eventually decided to create a new group to unite them all, and the St. Louligans were born. They have provided strong support for a number of St. Louis area soccer teams, including AC St. Louis, Saint Louis Athletica, St. Louis Lions, and Illinois Piasa.

Saint Louis FC worked closely with the St. Louligans to encourage their support, and on July 9, 2014, the club awarded the Louligans with the first Saint Louis FC season ticket. The group promised that for each home game, they would give a new fan the ticket as a way to encourage new fans to join the St. Louligans and support Saint Louis FC.

Ahead of the inaugural 2015 season, the Louligans coordinated with the Coopers, supporters for Louisville City FC, to create the Kings' Cup rivalry competition between the two expansion teams. The rivalry was incredibly one-sided on the field in Louisville's favor, but the two SGs enjoy interacting with each other and traveling to each other's matches.

== Colors and logo ==
The club conducted a fan vote to decide the team's crest. The logo chosen includes a fleur-de-lis, which acts as the focal point of the logo and pays tribute to Saint Louis' French heritage. Also included in the logo is a reference to the year the city was founded, 1764, and five lines to represent the club's five core values: unity, humility, passion, respect, and tradition.

== Year-by-year ==
| Season | USL Championship | | | | | | | | | Play-offs | U.S. Open Cup | Top Scorer | |
| Season | Pld | W | D | L | GF | GA | GD | Pts | Pos | Play-offs | U.S. Open Cup | Player | Goals |
|---|---|---|---|---|---|---|---|---|---|---|---|---|---|
| 2015 | 28 | 8 | 9 | 11 | 30 | 40 | −10 | 33 | 9th, Eastern | did not qualify | 4R | (United States) Bryan Gaul | 6 |
| 2016 | 30 | 8 | 10 | 12 | 42 | 44 | −2 | 34 | 14th, Western | did not qualify | 3R | (El Salvador) Irvin Herrera | 14 |
| 2017 | 32 | 9 | 9 | 14 | 35 | 48 | −13 | 36 | 12th, Eastern | did not qualify | 4R | (United States) Christian Volesky | 8 |
| 2018 | 34 | 14 | 11 | 9 | 44 | 38 | +6 | 53 | 8th, Western | Conference quarterfinals | 3R | (United States) Kyle Greig | 13 |
| 2019 | 34 | 11 | 9 | 14 | 40 | 41 | -1 | 42 | 11th, Eastern | did not qualify | Quarter-Finals | (England) Tyler Blackwood (United States) Sam Fink (United States) Kyle Greig | 7 |
| 2020 | 16 | 7 | 4 | 5 | 22 | 21 | +1 | 25 | 2nd, Eastern; Group E | Conference semifinals | Cancelled | (England) Tyler Blackwood | 6 |

=== Head coaches ===
- Includes USL Regular season, USL Play-offs and Lamar Hunt U.S. Open Cup

| Coach | Nationality | Start | End | Games | Win | Loss | Draw | Win % |
|---|---|---|---|---|---|---|---|---|
| Dale Schilly | United States | May 1, 2014 | August 15, 2016 | 56 | 18 | 22 | 16 | 32.14 |
| Tim Leonard (interim) | United States | August 15, 2016 | October 12, 2016 | 7 | 1 | 3 | 3 | 14.29 |
| Preki | Serbia | October 12, 2016 | November 19, 2017 | 35 | 11 | 15 | 9 | 31.43 |
| Anthony Pulis | Wales | November 20, 2017 | January 4, 2020 | 37 | 15 | 11 | 11 | 40.54 |
| Steve Trittschuh | United States | January 4, 2020 | October 17, 2020 | 18 | 8 | 6 | 4 | 44.44 |

== Player records ==
Statistics below show the all-time regular-season club leaders. Bold indicates active Saint Louis FC players.

| Category | Record holder | Total |
|---|---|---|
| Games | (United States) Sam Fink (2015–2016, 2018) | 119 |
| Goals | (United States) Kyle Greig (2018) | 20 |
| Assists | (England) Lewis Hilton (2018–2019) | 11 |
| Hat tricks | (El Salvador) Irvin Herrera (2016) | 1 |
| Shutouts | (United States) Jake Fenlason (2019) | 7 |
| Wins | (United States) Mark Pais (2015–2016) | 7 |

- All-time regular season record: 39–46–39 (Through 2018 season)

== See also ==
- Soccer in St. Louis
