= 2015 Wilmington Hammerheads FC season =

Wilmington Hammerheads FC
2015 season
- Manager: Carson Porter
- Stadium: Legion Stadium
- Top goalscorer: League: Nick Zimmerman (3); All: Nick Zimmerman (5)
- Highest home attendance: 4,265 (July 1 vs. Saint Louis)
- Lowest home attendance: League: 1,789 (Mar. 28 vs. Richmond); All: 600 (May 20 vs. Chattanooga)
- Average home league attendance: League: 2,829; All: 2,581
Home colors	Away colors

The 2015 Wilmington Hammerheads season was the club's nineteenth season of competitive soccer, and their fifth consecutive season since their one-year hiatus in 2010.

== Non-competitive ==
=== Pre-season ===
March 6, 2015 Friendly	UNC Wilmington Seahawks	2–1	Wilmington Hammerheads FC	Wilmington, North Carolina
18:00 ET				Stadium: UNCW Soccer Stadium

March 11, 2015 Friendly	Wilmington Hammerheads FC (United States)	0–4	(South Korea) Seoul E-Land	Cary, North Carolina
14:00 ET			? 25' ? 35' ? (?) ? 82'	Stadium: WakeMed Soccer Park

March 21, 2015 Friendly	Wilmington Hammerheads FC	1–2	North Carolina Tar Heels	Wilmington, North Carolina
17:30 ET	Zimmerman 89'		? 78'; Winn 84'	Stadium: Legion Stadium

== Competitions ==
=== USL Pro ===
==== Table ====
Eastern Conference

Pos	Team	Pld	W	D	L	GF	GA	GD	Pts
8	Harrisburg City Islanders	28	11	6	11	49	53	−4	39
9	Saint Louis FC	28	8	9	11	30	40	−10	33
10	FC Montreal	28	8	4	16	32	46	−14	28
11	Toronto FC II	28	6	5	17	26	52	−26	23
12	Wilmington Hammerheads	28	3	10	15	22	42	−20	19

Source: 2015 USL schedule
Rules for classification: 1) head-to-head; 2) total wins; 3) total goal differential; 4) total goals scored; 5) disciplinary points; 6) away goals scored; 7) away goal differential; 8) home goals scored; 9) home goal differential; 10) coin toss or drawing of lots

==== Results summary ====
Overall								Home						Away					
Pld	W	D	L	GF	GA	GD	Pts	W	D	L	GF	GA	GD	W	D	L	GF	GA	GD
27	3	9	15	20	40	−20	18	1	7	5	12	19	−7	2	2	10	8	21	−13

Last updated: September 12, 2015.
Source: USL Pro

==== Results by matchday ====
Matchday	1	2	3	4	5	6	7	8	9	10	11	12	13	14	15	16	17	18	19	20	21	22	23	24	25	26	27	28
Stadium	H	H	A	A	H	H	A	A	H	A	H	H	A	A	A	H	A	A	H	A	H	A	H	A	H	A	H	H
Result	D	D	L	W	L	L	L	L	D	L	D	L	D	W	L	D	L	L	L	L	W	L	D	L	L	D	D	
Position	8	6	6	6	7	10	10	10	11	11	11	11	12	11	12	12	12	12	12	12	12	12	12	12	12	12	12	

Updated to match(es) played on September 12, 2015. Source: MLS
A = Away; H = Home; W = Win; D = Draw; L = Loss

==== Matches ====
March 28, 2015 1	Wilmington Hammerheads FC	2–2	Richmond Kickers	Wilmington, North Carolina
19:00 EST	Cole 9'; Heaney 18'	Report	Robinson 41'; Delicâte 55'	Stadium: Legion Stadium; Attendance: 1,789

April 3, 2015 2	Wilmington Hammerheads FC	1–1	Charlotte Independence	Wilmington, North Carolina
19:00 EST	Zimmerman 43' (pen.)	Report	Martinez 72'	Stadium: Legion Stadium; Attendance: 2,480

April 10, 2015 3	Richmond Kickers	3–0	Wilmington Hammerheads	Richmond, Virginia
	Yeisley 4', 25'; Asante (yellow card) 52'; Garner 90'	Report	Campbell (yellow card) 41'; Ackley (yellow card) 60'	Stadium: City Stadium; Attendance: 1,632

April 12, 2015 4	New York Red Bulls II	0–3	Wilmington Hammerheads FC	Harrison, New Jersey
	Castaño (red card) 86'	Report	Zimmerman 22', 43'; Mendoza 88' (pen.); Poku (yellow card) 89'	Stadium: Red Bull Arena

April 26, 2015 5	Wilmington Hammerheads FC	1–2	Charleston Battery	Wilmington, North Carolina
3:00 p.m.	Peters (yellow card) 21'; Fairclough 60'	Report; Report	Prince 24', (yellow card) 70'; Chang 28' vanSchaik (yellow card) 49'; Kelly (yellow card) 86'	Stadium: Legion Stadium; Attendance: 2,985; Referee: Chris Spivey

May 2, 2015 6	Wilmington Hammerheads FC	0–4	Harrisburg City Islanders	Wilmington, North Carolina
	Tommy McMamara (yellow card) 67'	Summary	Tribbett 30' 69'; Jankouskas 58'; Plumhoff 88'	Stadium: Legion Stadium; Attendance: 2,526; Referee: (United States) Mark Gorak

May 9, 2015 7	Saint Louis FC	1–0	Wilmington Hammerheads FC	Fenton, Missouri
	Musa (yellow card) 73'; Fink 81'	Summary	Fairclough (yellow card) 60'	Stadium: St. Louis Soccer Park; Attendance: 4,096; Referee: (United States) Andrew Musashe

May 12, 2015 8	Louisville City FC	3–0	Wilmington Hammerheads FC	Louisville, Kentucky
	Rasmussen 16'; Quinn 40'; Shanosky 43'; Burke (yellow card) 51'	Report	Fairclough (yellow card) 26'; Parratt (yellow card) 45+'; Arnoux (yellow card) 68' (yellow-red card) 88'; Heaney (yellow card) 73'	Stadium: Louisville Slugger Field; Attendance: 4,911; Referee: Joshua Brooks

May 16, 2015 9	Wilmington Hammerheads FC	1–1	Rochester Rhinos	Wilmington, North Carolina
	Fairclough 90+'	Report	Rolfe (yellow card) 70'; Dos Santos 90'	Stadium: Legion Stadium; Attendance: 2,781; Referee: Doug Hartemann

May 30, 2015 10	Charleston Battery	1–0	Wilmington Hammerheads FC	Charleston, South Carolina
	Portillo 18' (pen.); Ferguson (yellow card) 82'	Report	Wheeler (yellow card) 18' (yellow-red card) 37'; Jane (yellow card) 52'	Stadium: Blackbaud Stadium; Attendance: 5,455; Referee: Alex Zhelyazkov

June 6, 2015 11	Wilmington Hammerheads FC	1–1	Charleston Battery	Wilmington, North Carolina
	Martínez (yellow card) 44'; Ackley (yellow card) 61'; Jane 69'	Report	Kelly (red card) 26' vanSchaik (yellow card) 45'; Chang (yellow card) 58'; Fairclough 85' (o.g.); Cooper (yellow card) 90'	Stadium: Legion Stadium; Attendance: 3,182; Referee: Jeremy Smith

June 13, 2015 12	Wilmington Hammerheads FC	0–1	New York Red Bulls II	Wilmington, North Carolina
	Arnoux (yellow card) 80'; Anunga (yellow card) 87'; Jackson (red card) 90'	Report	Tsonis 72'; Etienne (yellow card) 90'	Stadium: Legion Stadium; Attendance: 2,622; Referee: Dustin Thorne

June 20, 2015 13	Richmond Kickers	0-0	Wilmington Hammerheads FC	Richmond, Virginia
19:00		Report		Stadium: City Stadium; Attendance: 2,908; Referee: Matthew Franz

June 25, 2015 14	FC Montreal	1–2	Wilmington Hammerheads FC	Montreal, Quebec
19:30	Riggi (yellow card) 45'; Gagnon-Laparé (yellow card) 49'; N'Diaye 50'; Joly (yellow card) 83'	Summary	Parratt (yellow card) 36'; Ackley 42'; Nicholson (yellow card) 77'; Campbell (yellow card) 88'; Heaney 90'	Stadium: Stade Saputo; Attendance: 241; Referee: (Canada) Pierre-Luc Lauziere

June 27, 2015 15	Toronto FC II	1–0	Wilmington Hammerheads FC	Toronto, Ontario
19:00	Hamilton 45+2', (yellow card) 71'	Summary	Cole (yellow card) 14'	Stadium: BMO Field; Attendance: 50; Referee: (Canada) Marie-Soleil

July 1, 2015 16	Wilmington Hammerheads FC	0–0	Saint Louis FC	Wilmington, North Carolina
19:00	Martinez (yellow card) 12'	Report		Stadium: Legion Stadium; Attendance: 4,265; Referee: Mark Gorak

July 4, 2015 17	Harrisburg City Islanders	1–0	Wilmington Hammerheads FC	Harrisburg, Pennsylvania
19:00	Leverock (yellow card) 18'; Vallès (yellow card) 81'; Benbow 82'	Report	Ackley (yellow card) 18'	Stadium: Skyline Sports Complex; Attendance: 2,281; Referee: Jaroslaw Werel

July 18, 2015 18	Charleston Battery	1-0	Wilmington Hammerheads FC	Charleston, South Carolina
10:00	Kelly 17'; Chang (yellow card) 70'; Prince (yellow card) 84'	Summary	Parratt (yellow card) 8'; Ackley (yellow card) 62'	Stadium: Blackbaud Stadium; Attendance: 3,156; Referee: (United States) Esteban Rosano

25 July 2015 19	Wilmington Hammerheads FC	1-3	Louisville City FC	Wilmington, North Carolina
19:00	Ackley 23' (yellow card) 87'; Parratt (yellow card) 45'	Summary	Montano (yellow card) 17'; Fondy 45'; Shanosky 51'; Adams 56'; Guzman (yellow card) 87'	Stadium: Legion Stadium; Attendance: 3,373; Referee: (United States) Russell Davis

August 1, 2015 20	Pittsburgh Riverhounds	3-0	Wilmington Hammerheads FC	Pittsburgh, Pennsylvania
19:00	Vincent 20', 85', 90'; Brown (yellow card) 87'	Summary	Godelman (yellow card) 22'	Stadium: Highmark Stadium; Attendance: 2,807; Referee: (United States) Darth Newman

August 8, 2015 21	Wilmington Hammerheads FC	4-2	New York Red Bulls II	Wilmington, North Carolina
19:00	Defregger 16', 35'; Lawal (yellow card) 32', (goal) 45+1'; Ackley 61' (pen.)	Summary	Obekop 31'; McLaws (yellow card) 42'; Thomas (yellow card) 62'; Plewa (yellow card) 62' (yellow-red card) 84'; Tsonis 80', (yellow card) 89'	Stadium: Legion Stadium; Attendance: 3,875; Referee: (United States) Matthew Jozaitis

August 15, 2015 22	Rochester Rhinos	2-1	Wilmington Hammerheads FC	Rochester, New York, New York
18:05	Mendoza (yellow card) 19'; Forbes 26'; Apostolopoulos (yellow card) 33'; Van De Casteele 81'	Summary	Moose 59'; Cole (yellow card) 60'; Ackley (yellow card) 82'; Heaney (yellow card) 88'	Stadium: Sahlen's Stadium; Attendance: 4,842; Referee: (United States) Tori Penso

August 22, 2015 23	Wilmington Hammerheads FC	0-0	FC Montreal	Wilmington, North Carolina
18:00	Parratt (yellow card) 68'; Nicholson (yellow card) 68'	Summary	Sukunda (yellow card) 90'	Stadium: Legion Stadium; Attendance: 3,225; Referee: (United States) David Erbacher

August 29, 2015 24	New York Red Bulls II	2-0	Wilmington Hammerheads FC	Harrison, New Jersey
16:00	Sanchez 22'; Obekop 29'	Summary	Bone (yellow card) 61'; Wheeler (yellow card) 88'	Stadium: Red Bull Arena; Attendance: 942; Referee: (United States) Matthew Mercier

September 3, 2015 25	Wilmington Hammerheads FC	0-1	Charlotte Independence	Wilmington, North Carolina
18:00	Parratt (yellow card) 90'	Summary	Calvert (yellow card) 34'; Duckett (yellow card) 37' (goal) 73'	Stadium: Legion Stadium; Attendance: 2,470; Referee: (United States) Russell Davis

September 5, 2015 26	Charlotte Independence	2 - 2	Wilmington Hammerheads FC	Charlotte, North Carolina
18:00	Slogic (yellow card) 22'; DelPiccolo (yellow card) 31'; Martínez 72'; Herrera 90' (pen.)	Summary	Wheeler (yellow card) 30'; Fran Martínez (yellow card) 35'; Jane 66'; Defregger (yellow card) 73'; Lawal 82' (yellow card) 83'; Bone (yellow card) 90'	Stadium: Ramblewood Soccer Complex; Attendance: 2,013; Referee: (United States) Doug Hartemann

September 12, 2015 27	Wilmington Hammerheads FC	1 - 1	Pittsburgh Riverhounds	Wilmington, North Carolina
18:05	Campbell 15'; Ackley (yellow card) 39'; Cole (yellow card) 57'	Summary	Flunder (red card) 53'; Kerr (yellow card) 67'; Vini Dantas 70'	Stadium: Legion Stadium; Attendance: 2,617; Referee: (United States) Dustin Thorne

September 19, 2015 28	Wilmington Hammerheads FC	–	Toronto FC II	Wilmington, North Carolina
				Stadium: Legion Stadium

=== U.S. Open Cup ===
May 20, 2015 Second round	Wilmington Hammerheads (North Carolina)	1–1 (a.e.t.) (3–5 p)	(Tennessee) Chattanooga FC	Wilmington, North Carolina
7:00p.m.	Zimmerman 35' (pen.)	Report	Ochieng 57'	Stadium: Legion Stadium; Attendance: 600; Referee: Chris Spivey
	Penalties
	Tomaselli (penalty scored); Defregger (penalty missed); Arnoux (penalty scored); Zimmerman (penalty scored)		(penalty scored) Zecca; (penalty scored) Winter; (penalty scored) Kauker; (penalty scored) De Smedt; (penalty scored) Finlay

== Statistics ==
=== Appearances and goals ===
No.	Pos	Nat	Player	Total		USL Pro		Playoffs		U.S. Open Cup	
No.	Pos	Nat	Player	Apps	Goals	Apps	Goals	Apps	Goals	Apps	Goals
1	GK	(United States) USA	Larry Jackson	2	0	2+0	0	0+0	0	0+0	0
2	DF	(Scotland) SCO	Tom Parratt	2	0	0+2	0	0+0	0	0+0	0
3	DF	(United States) USA	Anthony Peters	2	0	2+0	0	0+0	0	0+0	0
4	DF	(Jamaica) JAM	Ashani Fairclough	0	0	0+0	0	0+0	0	0+0	0
5	DF	(United States) USA	Troy Cole	2	1	2+0	1	0+0	0	0+0	0
6	FW	(United States) USA	Brian Ackley	2	0	2+0	0	0+0	0	0+0	0
7	MF	(United States) USA	Ross Tomaselli	2	0	2+0	0	0+0	0	0+0	0
8	MF	(England) ENG	Paul Nicholson	2	0	2+0	0	0+0	0	0+0	0
9	FW	(United States) USA	Aaron Wheeler	0	0	0+0	0	0+0	0	0+0	0
10	MF	(United States) USA	Justin Moose	2	0	2+0	0	0+0	0	0+0	0
11	FW	(Lesotho) LES	Sunny Jane	1	0	1+0	0	0+0	0	0+0	0
12	DF	(Jamaica) JAM	Andrae Campbell	2	0	2+0	0	0+0	0	0+0	0
14	MF	(United States) USA	Marc Godelman	2	0	0+2	0	0+0	0	0+0	0
16	MF	(United States) USA	Stefan Defregger	2	0	1+1	0	0+0	0	0+0	0
17	FW	(United States) USA	Cody Arnoux	0	0	0+0	0	0+0	0	0+0	0
19	MF	(United States) USA	Corben Bone	0	0	0+0	0	0+0	0	0+0	0
21	MF	(England) ENG	William Heaney	2	1	2+0	1	0+0	0	0+0	0
22	GK	(United States) USA	Matt Glaeser	0	0	0+0	0	0+0	0	0+0	0
23	MF	(United States) USA	Nick Zimmerman	2	1	2+0	1	0+0	0	0+0	0
	GK	(United States) USA	Andre Rawls	0	0	0+0	0	0+0	0	0+0	0

== Transfers ==
=== In ===
No.	Pos.	Nat.	Name	Age	US	Moving from	Type	Transfer window	Ends	Transfer fee	Source
10	MF	(United States)	Justin Moose	31	US	(Finland) SJK	Free	Winter		Free	wilmingtonhammerheads.com
1	GK	(United States)	Larry Jackson		US	(United States) New England Revolution	Free	Winter		Free	wilmingtonhammerheads.com
3	DF	(United States)	Anthony Peters	31	US	(United States) C.D. Motagua New Orleans	Free	Winter		Free	wilmingtonhammerheads.com
23	MF	(United States)	Nick Zimmerman	27	US	(United States) Carolina RailHawks	Free	Winter		Free	wilmingtonhammerheads.com
9	FW	(United States)	Aaron Wheeler	26	US	(United States) Philadelphia Union	Free	Winter		Free	wilmingtonhammerheads.com
16	MF	(United States)	Justin Defregger		US	(United States) Dartmouth Big Green	Free	Winter		Free	wilmingtonhammerheads.com
	GK	(United States)	Andre Rawls		US	(United States) Saint Mary's Gaels	Free	Winter		Free	wilmingtonhammerheads.com
