= 2015 Richmond Kickers season =

Richmond Kickers
2015 season
- Owner: RKYSC
- Head coach: Leigh Cowlishaw
- Stadium: City Stadium
- USL: TBD
- USL Playoffs: TBD
- U.S. Open Cup: Fourth Round
- Top goalscorer: League: Matthew Delicâte (6); All: Jason Yeisley (8)
- Highest home attendance: 5,957 (Aug. 29 vs. Charleston Battery)
- Lowest home attendance: League: 1,632 (Apr. 10 vs. Wilmington); All: 1,104 (May 20 vs. Virginia Beach)
- Average home league attendance: League: 3,747; All: 2,880
Home colors	Away colors	Third colors

The 2015 Richmond Kickers season was the club's twenty-third season of existence. It is also the Kickers' eighth-consecutive year in the third-tier of American soccer, playing in the United Soccer League (formerly USL Pro) for their fourth season.

== First team squad ==
As of 31 May 2015

=== First team roster ===
No.	Position	Nation	Player
0	GK	USA	Andrew Romig
1	GK	USA	Ryan Taylor
2	DF	CMR	Yomby William
3	DF	USA	Stephen Basso
4	MF	GHA	Fred Owusu Sekyere
5	MF	USA	Michael Callahan
7	MF	ENG	Matthew Delicâte
8	DF	USA	Hugh Roberts
11	FW	USA	George Davis IV
12	MF	USA	Chris Durkin
14	MF	JPN	Yudai Imura
15	FW	USA	Thomas Eli Garner
16	MF	SCO	Ricky Burke
17	FW	USA	Jason Yeisley
18	DF	GUM	Alex Lee
20	DF	USA	Jalen Robinson (on loan from D.C. United)
21	MF	USA	Nathan Shiffman
22	MF	USA	Brian Ownby
23	DF	GER	Sascha Görres
24	MF	USA	Miguel Aguilar (on loan from D.C. United)
27	MF	USA	Collin Martin (on loan from D.C. United)
28	MF	GHA	Samuel Asante
31	DF	USA	Braeden Troyer
34	MF	USA	Luke Mishu (on loan from D.C. United)
36	GK	USA	Jake Gelnovatch
40	MF	USA	Houston Oldham
48	GK	USA	Travis Worra (on loan from D.C. United)

=== Goalscorers ===
Includes all competitive matches. The list is sorted alphabetically by surname when total goals are equal.

Correct as of match played on 30 May 2015

No.	Nat.	Player	Pos.	League	Lamar Hunt Open Cup	TOTAL
7	(England)	Matthew Delicâte	FW	5	0	5
22	(United States)	Brian Ownby	MF	4	1	5
11	(United States)	George Davis IV	MF	4	1	5
7	(United States)	Jason Yeisley	FW	3	2	5
15	(United States)	Eli Garner	FW	2	0	2
20	(United States)	Jalen Robinson	MF	1	0	1
21	(United States)	Nate Shiffman	MF	0	1	1
Own Goals				0	0	0
Totals				19	5	24

== Non-competitive ==
=== Preseason ===
February 28	Richmond Kickers	Cancelled	Virginia Cavaliers	Bensley, Virginia
6:00 p.m. ET		Report		Stadium: Ukrop Park
Note: Cancelled due to inclement weather.

March 1	Richmond Kickers	0–0	Georgetown Hoyas	Bensley, Virginia
5:00 p.m. ET				Stadium: Ukrop Park

March 5	Richmond Kickers	Cancelled	James Madison Dukes	Bensley, Virginia
7:30 p.m. ET		Report		Stadium: Ukrop Park
Note: Postponed due to severe weather

March 8	Richmond Kickers	1–0	Navy Midshipmen	Bensley, Virginia
5:00 p.m. ET	Garner 43'			Stadium: Ukrop Park

March 15	Richmond Kickers	3–0	Longwood Lancers	Bensley, Virginia
5:00 p.m. ET	Delicâte 16'; Yeisley 29' (pen.); Sekyere 56'			Stadium: Ukrop Park

March 18	Richmond Kickers	1–0	William & Mary Tribe	Richmond, Virginia
7:00 p.m. ET				Stadium: City Stadium

March 22	Richmond Kickers	1–0	VCU Rams	Richmond, Virginia
5:00 p.m. ET	Davis IV 19' (pen.)			Stadium: City Stadium

=== Midseason exhibitions ===
July 19	Richmond Kickers (United States)	1–2	(England) West Bromwich Albion	Richmond, Virginia
ET		Summary		Stadium: City Stadium

== Competitive ==
=== USL ===
==== Table ====
Pos	Team	Pld	W	D	L	GF	GA	GD	Pts	Qualification
4	New York Red Bulls II	28	12	6	10	46	45	+1	42	First round
5	Pittsburgh Riverhounds	28	11	8	9	53	42	+11	41	First round
6	Richmond Kickers	28	10	11	7	41	35	+6	41	First round
7	Charlotte Independence	28	10	10	8	38	35	+3	40	
8	Harrisburg City Islanders	28	11	6	11	49	53	−4	39	

Source: 2015 USL schedule
Rules for classification: 1) head-to-head; 2) total wins; 3) total goal differential; 4) total goals scored; 5) disciplinary points; 6) away goals scored; 7) away goal differential; 8) home goals scored; 9) home goal differential; 10) coin toss or drawing of lots

==== Results ====
March 28 1	Wilmington Hammerheads	2–2	Richmond Kickers	Wilmington, North Carolina
7:00 p.m. ET	Cole 9'; Heaney 18'; Parratt (yellow card) 70'; Godelman (yellow card) 83'	Report	Sekyere (yellow card) 23'; Robinson 41'; Delicâte 55'	Stadium: Legion Stadium; Attendance: 1,789

April 4 2	Richmond Kickers	1–1	Louisville City	Richmond, Virginia
5:00 p.m. ET	Callahan (yellow card) 20'; Yomby (yellow card) 33'; Robinson (yellow card) 34'; Delicâte 51'; Davis IV (yellow card) 82'	Report	Shanosky (yellow card) 4'; King 35'; Burke (yellow card) 70'; King (yellow card) 78'	Stadium: City Stadium; Attendance: 4,683; Referee: Matthew Franz

April 10 3	Richmond Kickers	3–0	Wilmington Hammerheads	Richmond, Virginia
7:00 p.m. ET	Yeisley 4', 25'; Asante (yellow card) 52'; Garner 90'	Report	Campbell (yellow card) 41'; Ackley (yellow card) 60'	Stadium: City Stadium; Attendance: 1,632; Referee: Charles Carson

April 18 4	Richmond Kickers	3–0	Charlotte Independence	Richmond, Virginia
7:00 p.m. ET	Davis IV 43' (pen.), 54', 74' (pen.)	Report; Box Score		Stadium: City Stadium; Attendance: 3,533; Referee: Mark Gorak

April 22 5	New York Red Bulls II	0–1	Richmond Kickers	Harrison, New Jersey
7:30 p.m. ET	Lade (yellow card) 84'	Report	Ownby 50' (pen.); Aguilar (yellow card) 70'; Callahan (yellow card) 76'	Stadium: Red Bull Arena; Referee: Jaime Herrera

April 25 6	FC Montreal	0–1	Richmond Kickers	Montreal, Quebec
2:30 p.m. ET	Alexander (yellow card) 71'; Temguia (yellow card) 74'	Report	Delicâte 30'; Sekyere (yellow card) 49'; Ownby (yellow card) 90'	Stadium: Saputo Stadium Turf Field; Attendance: 265; Referee: Francis Latulippe

May 2 7	Richmond Kickers	2–2	Charleston Battery	Richmond, Virginia
7:00 p.m. ET	Ownby 32'; Delicâte 79'	Report	Prince 48'; Garbanzo 49'; Woodbine (yellow card) 90'	Stadium: City Stadium; Attendance: 3,163; Referee: Matthew Kreitzer

May 8 8	Charlotte Independence	3–0	Richmond Kickers	Rock Hill, South Carolina
7:30 p.m. ET	Finley 25'; Slogic 47'; Hairston 50'	Report	Lee (red card) 41'	Stadium: Eagle Field; Attendance: 2,177; Referee: Doug Hartemann

May 16 9	Pittsburgh Riverhounds	1–1	Richmond Kickers	Pittsburgh, Pennsylvania
7:00 p.m. ET	Arena 55'; Okai (yellow card) 67'; Moloto (yellow card) 90+'	Report	Ownby 24', (yellow card) 85'; Jeffrey (yellow card) 90+'	Stadium: Highmark Stadium; Attendance: 3,622; Referee: Donovan Noocha

May 23 10	Richmond Kickers	1–2	Pittsburgh Riverhounds	Richmond, Virginia
7:00 p.m. ET	Sekyere (yellow card) 24'; Asante (yellow card) 35'; Delicâte 56'; Worra (yellow card) 88'	Report	Moloto 12', (yellow card) 83'; Cabrilo 18'; Kerr (yellow card) 26'	Stadium: City Stadium; Attendance: 2,868; Referee: Matthew Franz

May 30 11	Richmond Kickers	4–2	New York Red Bulls II	Richmond, Virginia
7:00 p.m. ET	Sekyere (yellow card) 10'; Ownby 14'; Yeisley 37'; Garner 39'; Davis IV 68'	Report	Dafonte (yellow card) 26'; Etienne 48'; Tsonis (yellow card) 71' (goal) 80'	Stadium: City Stadium; Attendance: 2,954; Referee: Benjamin Hichak

June 7 12	Richmond Kickers	2–1	Charlotte Independence	Richmond, Virginia
5:00 p.m. ET	Yeisley 3'; Asante (yellow card) 7'; Delicâte 21'	Report	A. Martínez (yellow card) 7'; Eloundou (yellow card) 37'; Herrera 62'; Cox (yellow card) 86'	Stadium: City Stadium; Attendance: 3,582; Referee: Mark Gorak

June 10 13	Charleston Battery	1–1	Richmond Kickers	Charleston, South Carolina
7:30 p.m. ET	Garbanzo 28'	Report	Davis IV (yellow card) 33'; Asante 44'; Sekyere (yellow card) 52'; Basso (yellow card) 78'	Stadium: Blackbaud Stadium; Attendance: 3,035; Referee: Mark Sauro

June 13 14	Richmond Kickers	0–0	FC Montreal	Richmond, Virginia
7:00 p.m. ET	Asante (yellow card) 40'	USL Report; Kickers Report		Stadium: City Stadium; Attendance: 2,819; Referee: Charles Carson

June 20 15	Richmond Kickers	0–0	Wilmington Hammerheads	Richmond, Virginia
7:00 p.m. ET		Report		Stadium: City Stadium; Attendance: 2,908; Referee: Matthew Franz
Note: Matched abandoned at halftime due to severe thunderstorms.

June 26 16	Charlotte Independence	0–0	Richmond Kickers	Charlotte, North Carolina
7:30 p.m. ET		Report		Stadium: Ramblewood Stadium; Attendance: 1,354; Referee: Dustin Thorne

July 4 17	Louisville City	3–0	Richmond Kickers	Louisville, Kentucky
7:30 p.m. ET	Fondy 17'; Rasmussen 60'; Morad 61'; Dacres (yellow card) 73'	Report	Sekyere (yellow card) 80'	Stadium: Louisville Slugger Field; Attendance: 8,254; Referee: Vito Testa, Jr.

July 11 18	St. Louis FC	1–3	Richmond Kickers	Fenton, Missouri
8:30 p.m. ET	Gaul 12' (pen.); Bushue (yellow card) 65'	Report	Taylor (yellow card) 11'; Imura (yellow card) 27'; Davis IV 44'; Yeisley 75'; Callahan 81'	Stadium: St. Louis Soccer Park; Attendance: 4,562; Referee: Kyle Burkhardt

July 25 19	New York Red Bulls II	4–3	Richmond Kickers	Harrison, New Jersey
7:00 p.m. ET	Tsonis 11' 45'; Sánchez 39'; Fonte (yellow card) 56'; Bedoya 80'; Thomas (yellow card) 90'	Summary	Yeisley 17' 23'; Shiffman 89'	Stadium: Red Bull Arena; Attendance: 638

August 1 20	Richmond Kickers	4–2	Harrisburg City Islanders	Richmond, Virginia
7:00 p.m. ET	Sekyere 15'; Yeisley 47' 90'; Davis 88'	Summary	Foster 25' 68'; Ekra (yellow card) 78'	Stadium: City Stadium; Attendance: 5,580; Referee: (United States) Charles Carson

August 8 21	Harrisburg City Islanders	3–2	Richmond Kickers	Harrisburg, Pennsylvania
7:00 p.m. ET	Tribbett (yellow card) 11'; Ekra 27' (yellow card) 75'; Jankouskas 56'; Leverock 60'; Eric Bird (yellow card) 90'	Summary	Roberts (yellow card) 21'; Yeisley 66' (pen.) 86' (pen.) (yellow card) 90'	Stadium: Skyline Sports Complex; Attendance: 2,492; Referee: (United States) Charles Murphy

August 9 22	Rochester Rhinos	1–1	Richmond Kickers	Rochester, New York
5:05 p.m. ET	Forbes 50'	Summary	Jared Jeffrey (yellow card) 36' (goal) 52'; Yomby (yellow card) 41'; Travis Worra (yellow card) 50'; Sekyere (yellow card) 66'	Stadium: Sahlen's Stadium; Attendance: 5,234; Referee: (United States) Vito Testa

August 15 23	Toronto FC II	2–1	Richmond Kickers	Vaughan, Ontario
3:00 p.m. ET				Stadium: Ontario Soccer Centre

August 22 24	Richmond Kickers	2–0	St. Louis FC	Richmond, Virginia
7:00 p.m. ET				Stadium: City Stadium

August 29 25	Richmond Kickers	0–2	Charleston Battery	Richmond, Virginia
7:00 p.m. ET				Stadium: City Stadium

September 5 26	Richmond Kickers	0–0	Rochester Rhinos	Richmond, Virginia
7:00 p.m. ET				Stadium: City Stadium

September 12 27	Harrisburg City Islanders	1–1	Richmond Kickers	Harrisburg, Pennsylvania
7:00 p.m. ET				Stadium: Skyline Sports Complex

September 16 28	Richmond Kickers	2–1	Toronto FC II	Richmond, Virginia
7:00 p.m. ET				Stadium: City Stadium

=== USL Pro Playoffs ===
September 26 First round	Charleston Battery	2–1 (a.e.t.)	Richmond Kickers	Charleston, South Carolina
7:30 pm EDT	Kelly 107'; Boyd (yellow card) 109' (red card) 120'; Lasso 114'	Report; Report; Report	Callahan (yellow card) 27'; Mueller 92' (o.g.)	Stadium: MUSC Health Stadium; Attendance: 3,427; Referee: Matthew Kreitzer

=== U.S. Open Cup ===
May 20 Second round	Richmond Kickers (Virginia)	2–0	Virginia Beach City FC	Richmond, Virginia
7:00 p.m. ET	Shiffman 47'; Taylor (yellow card) 78'; Yeisley 89'	Report	T. Cyrus (yellow card) 27'; J. Cyrus (yellow card) 45'	Stadium: City Stadium; Attendance: 1,104; Referee: Randall Kelley

May 27 Third round	Richmond Kickers (Virginia)	3–0	(Florida) Jacksonville Armada	Richmond, Virginia
7:00 p.m. ET	Ownby 20'; Yeisley 38'; Davis IV 51' (pen.)	Report	Ortiz (yellow card) 21'; Zaldana (yellow card) 45'; Gallardo (yellow card) 51'	Stadium: City Stadium; Attendance: 1,276; Referee: Matthew Kreitzer

June 17 Fourth round	Richmond Kickers (Virginia)	1–3	(Ohio) Columbus Crew	Richmond, Virginia
7:00 p.m. ET	Sekyere 24'	Kickers Report; MLS Report	Bedell 18', 63'; Tchani (yellow card) 34'; Finlay 42'	Stadium: City Stadium; Attendance: 4,040; Referee: Kevin Terry
