= 2016 Wilmington Hammerheads FC season =

Wilmington Hammerheads FC
2016 season
- General manager: Jason Arnold
- Head coach: Mark Briggs
- Stadium: Legion Stadium
- USL: Conference: TBD
- USL Playoffs: TBD
Home colors	Away colors

The 2016 Wilmington Hammerheads FC season was the club's 20th year of existence. They were members of the United Soccer League Eastern Conference.

== Roster ==
As of March 28, 2016

No.	Position	Nation	Player
0	GK	USA	Sam Williams
1	GK	CAN	John Smits
2	DF	SCO	Tom Parratt
3	DF	USA	Peabo Doue
4	DF	USA	Michael Mecham
5	DF	GUI	Mahamoudou Kaba
6	MF	IRL	Liam Miller
7	FW	USA	Austin Martz
8	MF	USA	Mael Corboz
9	FW	ENG	Matthew Barnes-Homer
10	MF	USA	Justin Moose
12	FW	USA	Casey Townsend
13	MF	ARM	Michael Soboff
14	FW	USA	Logan Miller
16	GK	CMR	Eric Ati
18	DF	USA	Stefan Defregger
19	MF	USA	Jeff Michaud (on loan from Tampa Bay Rowdies)
20	MF	USA	Zev Taublieb
22	FW	USA	Kyle Parker
23	DF	BRA	Bruno Perone
25	DF	COD	Ferrety Sousa
44	FW	NGR	Qudus Lawal
47	DF	JAM	Ashani Fairclough

== Competitions ==
=== USL Regular season ===
==== Standings ====
Pos	Team	Pld	W	D	L	GF	GA	GD	Pts	Qualification
7	Richmond Kickers	30	12	9	9	33	26	+7	45	Conference Playoffs
8	Orlando City B	30	9	8	13	35	49	−14	35	Conference Playoffs
9	Wilmington Hammerheads FC	30	8	10	12	37	47	−10	34	
10	Harrisburg City Islanders	30	8	7	15	37	54	−17	31	
11	Bethlehem Steel FC	30	6	10	14	32	43	−11	28	

Source: 2016 USL Standings
Rules for classification: 1) total wins; 2) total goal differential; 3) total goals scored; 4) points earned against top four Conference finishers; 5) disciplinary points; 6) coin toss or drawing of lots

==== Matches ====
All times in regular season on Eastern Daylight Time (UTC-04:00)

Win Draw Loss Upcoming fixture

March 26, 2016 1	Orlando City B	1–2	Wilmington Hammerheads FC	Melbourne, Florida
7:30pm	Ribeiro (yellow card) 42' (goal) 56'; McFadden (yellow card) 62'; Neal (yellow card) 90+1'	Report	Perone (yellow card) 39'; Fairclough 56'; Corbox (yellow card) 61'; Miller 65'	Stadium: Titan Soccer Complex; Referee: 2,078

April 1, 2016 2	Wilmington Hammerheads FC	0–0	Richmond Kickers	Wilmington, North Carolina
7:00pm	Perone (yellow card) 27'; Parratt (yellow card) 69'	Report	Yeisley (yellow card) 44'; Callahan (yellow card) 80'; Yomby (yellow card) 85'	Stadium: Legion Stadium; Referee: Neil Barbulescu

April 9, 2016 3	Charleston Battery	2–1	Wilmington Hammerheads FC	Charleston, South Carolina
7:30pm	Williams 2'; Prince (yellow card) 51'; Mueller 85'; Portillo (yellow card) 90'	Report	Moose (yellow card) 29'; Perone 31'; Lawal (yellow card) 67'	Stadium: MUSC Health Stadium

April 17, 2016 4	Wilmington Hammerheads FC	2–0	FC Montreal	Wilmington, North Carolina
3:00pm	Lawal 6'; Barnes-Homer 59'	Report	Béland-Goyette (yellow card) 30'; Tissot (yellow card) 61'; Gagnon-Laparé (yellow card) 85'	Stadium: Legion Stadium

April 22, 2016 5	Wilmington Hammerheads FC	0–1	New York Red Bulls II	Wilmington
7:00pm	Prieto (yellow card) 32'; Fairclough (yellow card) 82'	Report	Metzger 59'	Stadium: Legion Stadium

April 30, 2016 6	FC Cincinnati	1–1	Wilmington Hammerheads FC	Cincinnati, Ohio
7:00pm	Nicholson 48'	Report	Perone 24'; Michaud (yellow card) 40'; Miller (yellow card) 44'; Fairclough (yellow card) 58'	Stadium: Nippert Stadium; Attendance: 11,318; Referee: Donovan Noocha

May 7, 2016 7	Richmond Kickers	1–0	Wilmington Hammerheads FC	Richmond
7:00pm	Perone 52' (o.g.); Ownby (yellow card) 54'; Asante (yellow card) 90+1'	Report	Fairclough (yellow card) 33'; Barnes-Homer (yellow card) 40'; Doue (yellow card) 89'	Stadium: City Stadium; Attendance: 4,209; Referee: Danielle Cheskey

May 10, 2016 8	Wilmington Hammerheads FC	1–1	Charlotte Independence	Wilmington, North Carolina
7:00pm	Perone 15' (pen.)	Report	Brown 42'	Stadium: Legion Field; Attendance: 2,776

May 21, 2016 9	Wilmington Hammerheads FC	0–1	Charleston Battery	Wilmington, North Carolina
7:00pm	Michaud (yellow card) 59'; Barnes-Homer (yellow card) 67'; Miller (red card) 78'	Report	Ferguson 33'; Garbonzo (yellow card) 63'; Prince (yellow card) 69'; Portillo (yellow card) 76'	Stadium: Legion Stadium; Attendance: 2,958

May 29, 2016 10	Toronto FC II	1–3	Wilmington Hammerheads	Vaughan, Ontario
7:30pm	Hundal 23'; Thomas (yellow card) 30' (yellow-red card) 60'; Taintor (yellow card) 90'	Report	Perone 30' (pen.); Taublieb (yellow card) 65'; Corboz 83'; Barnes-Homer 90'	Stadium: Ontario Soccer Centre

June 3, 2016 11	Wilmington Hammerheads FC	3–2	Harrisburg City Islanders	Wilmington, North Carolina
7:00pm	Fairclough 3'; Parker 14', 90'; Mecham (yellow card) 22'	Report]	Warshaw 17', 27' (yellow card) 52'; Bolduc (yellow card) 82'	Stadium: Legion Stadium; Attendance: 3,744

June 11, 2016 12	Louisville City FC	2–2	Wilmington Hammerheads FC	Louisville, Kentucky
7:30pm	Hoffman 41', 48'	Report	Parker 17'; Lawal (yellow card) 76'; Fairclough 90+2'	Stadium: Louisville Slugger Field; Attendance: 7,761; Referee: Greg Dopka

June 17, 2016 13	Wilmington Hammerheads FC	1–1	Bethlehem Steel FC	Wilmington, North Carolina
7:00pm	Fairclough 48'; Townsend (yellow card) 63'	Report	Conneh 19'; Akinyode (yellow card) 57'; Jones (yellow card) 89'	Stadium: Legion Stadium; Attendance: 2,901; Referee: Jorge Ramirez

June 26, 2016 14	New York Red Bulls II	4–0	Wilmington Hammerheads FC	Harrison, New Jersey
5:00pm	Allen 20'; Long 77'; Bonomo 85' (pen.); Junior Flemmings 87'	Report	Corboz (yellow card) 41'; Parratt (yellow card) 65' (yellow-red card) 90'	Stadium: Red Bull Arena; Attendance: 453

July 2, 2016 15	Wilmington Hammerheads FC	3–0	Toronto FC II	Wilmington, North Carolina
5:00pm	Townsend 14'; Martz 39'; Miller 46'; Fairclough (yellow card) 83'	Report		Stadium: Legion Stadium; Attendance: 3,837; Referee: Rubiel Vazquez

July 9, 2016 16	Charlotte Independence	1–2	Wilmington Hammerheads FC	Charlotte, North Carolina
7:00pm	Hilton 45+1'	Report	Perone (yellow card) 20'; Fairclough (yellow card) 24'; Townsend 43'; Martz 65'	Stadium: Ramblewood Soccer Complex; Attendance: 1,595

July 14, 2016 17	Bethlehem Steel FC	3–0	Wilmington Hammerheads FC	Bethlehem, Pennsylvania
12:00pm	Heard 29'; Jones 42'; Gissie 54'; Conneh (yellow card) 66'	Report	Defregger (yellow card) 29'; Miller (yellow card) 83'; Perone (yellow card) 90'	Stadium: Goodman Stadium; Attendance: 1,008; Referee: Brandon Artis

July 17, 2016 18	Wilmington Hammerheads FC	1–4	Louisville City FC	Wilmington, North Carolina
6:00pm	Perone 88' (pen.)	Report	Abend 12'; Hoffman 64' (pen.), 80'; Quinn 69'	Stadium: Legion Stadium; Attendance: 2,927; Referee: Caleb Mendez

July 24, 2016 19	Orlando City B	2–2	Wilmington Hammerheads FC	Melbourne, Florida
7:30pm	Cox 27' (pen.); Rocha 82'; Laryea (yellow card) 89'	Report	Miller (yellow card) 26' (goal) 90'; Fairclough 48' (yellow card) 72'; Perone (red card) 55'	Stadium: Titan Soccer Complex

July 30, 2016 20	Wilmington Hammerheads FC	1–4	Pittsburgh Riverhounds	Wilmington, North Carolina
7:00pm	Binns (yellow card) 39'; Lynch 62'; Lawal (red card) 72'	Report	Kerr 45'; Hertzog 45+1', 69'; Campbell (yellow card) 47'; Thompson 90+1'	Stadium: Legion Stadium; Referee: Christopher Spivey;

August 6, 2016 21	Rochester Rhinos	2–0	Wilmington Hammerheads FC	Rochester, New York
7:30pm		Report		Stadium: Rochester Rhinos Stadium

August 13, 2016 22	Charlotte Independence	v	Wilmington Hammerheads FC	Charlotte, North Carolina
7:00pm				Stadium: Ramblewood Soccer Complex

August 20, 2016 23	Wilmington Hammerheads FC	v	Pittsburgh Riverhounds	Wilmington, North Carolina
7:00pm				Stadium: Legion Stadium

August 24, 2016 24	Pittsburgh Riverhounds	v	Wilmington Hammerheads FC	Pittsburgh, Pennsylvania
7:00pm				Stadium: Highmark Stadium

August 27, 2016 25	Wilmington Hammerheads FC	v	Rochester Rhinos	Wilmington, North Carolina
7:00pm				Stadium: Legion Stadium

August 31, 2016 26	FC Montreal	v	Wilmington Hammerheads FC	Montreal, Quebec
7:00pm				Stadium: Complexe sportif Claude-Robillard

September 7, 2016 27	Wilmington Hammerheads FC	v	Orlando City B	Wilmington, North Carolina
7:00pm				Stadium: Legion Stadium

September 11, 2016 28	Wilmington Hammerheads FC	v	FC Cincinnati	Wilmington, North Carolina
3:00pm				Stadium: Legion Stadium

September 17, 2016 29	Harrisburg City Islanders	v	Wilmington Hammerheads FC	Lancaster, Pennsylvania
7:00pm				Stadium: Clipper Magazine Stadium

September 24, 2016 30	Wilmington Hammerheads FC	v	Richmond Kickers	Wilmington, North Carolina
7:00pm				Stadium: Legion Stadium

Schedule source

=== U.S. Open Cup ===
May 18, 2016 Second round	Wilmington Hammerheads FC (North Carolina)	6–0	(Florida) Miami Fusion FC	Wilmington, North Carolina
7:00pm	Martz 6', 19', 32'; Moose 9'; Parker 78', 90+2'	Report		Stadium: Legion Stadium; Referee: Corson Fidler

June 1, 2016 Third round	Miami FC (Florida)	1–2	(North Carolina) Wilmington Hammerheads FC	Miami, Florida
8:00pm	Chavez 52'		Michaud 2'; Moose 5'	Stadium: FIU Stadium; Referee: Guido Gonzales Jr.

June 14, 2016 Fourth round	Real Salt Lake (Utah)	2–2 (a.e.t.) (3–1 p)	(North Carolina) Wilmington Hammerheads FC	Sandy, Utah
10:00pm	Plata 68'; Martínez 86'	Report	Corboz 34'; Michaud 58'	Stadium: Rio Tinto Stadium; Attendance: 17,131; Referee: Victor Rivas (California)
	Penalties
	Martínez (penalty scored); Plata (penalty scored); Morales (penalty missed); Wingert (penalty scored)		Perone (penalty missed); Corboz (penalty scored); Barnes-Homer (penalty missed); Miller (penalty missed)
