= 2015 Louisville City FC season =

Louisville City
2015 season
- Owner: Wayne Estopinal
- Manager: James O'Connor
- Stadium: Louisville Slugger Field
- USL: 2nd, Eastern
- USL Playoffs: Conference finals
- U.S. Open Cup: 4th Round
- Top goalscorer: League: Matt Fondy (22); All: Matt Fondy (24)
- Highest home attendance: 8,517 (Oct 3 vs. Charleston)
- Lowest home attendance: 4,772 (Apr 16 vs. Rochester)
- Average home league attendance: 6,765

The 2015 Louisville City FC season was the club's first season playing in Louisville, Kentucky in the United Soccer League (USL), in the third tier of the United States soccer league system.

== Background ==
The club was announced in 2014 when Orlando City relocated to Louisville, led by then-minority owner Wayne Estopinal and played their first season in 2015.

== Squad information ==
As of September 2, 2015

| No. | Position | Nation | Player |
|---|---|---|---|
| 1 | GK | USA | Scott Goodwin |
| 2 | MF | USA | Bryan Burke |
| 3 | DF | USA | Adam West |
| 4 | MF | USA | Aodhan Quinn |
| 5 | DF | USA | Conor Shanosky |
| 6 | DF | USA | Tarek Morad |
| 7 | MF | USA | Kadeem Dacres |
| 8 | MF | USA | Juan Guzman |
| 9 | FW | USA | Matt Fondy |
| 10 | MF | DEN | Magnus Rasmussen |
| 11 | MF | IRL | Niall McCabe |
| 13 | GK | CAN | Greg Ranjitsingh |
| 14 | FW | SRB | Ilija Ilic |
| 15 | DF | USA | Sean Reynolds |
| 16 | FW | USA | Nate Polak |
| 17 | MF | CAN | Kevin Cossette |
| 18 | FW | ENG | Cameron Lancaster |
| 19 | MF | ISR | Guy Abend |
| 20 | MF | USA | Enrique Montano |
| 94 | DF | ENG | Charlie Adams |

== Competitions ==
=== Friendlies ===
| February 25, 2015 Preseason | Louisville City | Canceled | Evansville Purple Aces | Louisville, Kentucky |
| 7:45 p.m. | | Report | | Stadium: Assumption High School |

| February 28, 2015 Preseason | Louisville City | Canceled | Young Harris Mountain Lions | Jeffersonville, Indiana |
| 11:00 a.m. | | Report | | Stadium: Woehrle Athletic Complex |

| March 3, 2015 Preseason | Indiana Hoosiers | 2–3 | Louisville City | Bloomington, Indiana |
| 3:00 p.m. | 25'; 49' | Report | Fondy 30', 37'; Lancaster 85' | Stadium: Mellencamp Pavilion |

| March 11, 2015 Preseason | Louisville Cardinals | 0–3 | Louisville City | Louisville, Kentucky |
| 7:00 p.m. | | Report | Rasmussen 25'; Fondy 39'; Illic 86' | Stadium: Cardinal Park |

| March 14, 2015 Preseason | Kentucky Wildcats | 0–0 | Louisville City | Lexington, Kentucky |
| 3:00 p.m. | | Report | | Stadium: Lafayette High School |

| March 17, 2015 Preseason | Louisville City | 5–0 | Lindsey Wilson Blue Raiders | Louisville, Kentucky |
| 7:45 p.m. | Rasmussen 4', 52'; Polak 20', 86'; Illic 60' | Report | | Stadium: Assumption High School |

| March 22, 2015 Preseason | Indy Eleven | 1-2 | Louisville City |
| | | Report |

| April 9, 2015 Friendly | SIUE Cougars | 1–0 | Louisville City | Edwardsville, Illinois |
| 7:45 p.m. | Hull 86' | Report | | Stadium: Ralph Korte Stadium |

| August 25, 2015 Friendly | Louisville City | 3–1 | Orlando City SC | Louisville, Kentucky |
| 7:30pm | Fondy 35'; Guzman 50'; Adams 78' | Report | Mwanga 66' | Stadium: Louisville Slugger Field; Attendance: 9,434 |

=== United Soccer League ===
All times in regular season on Eastern Daylight Time (UTC-04:00)

==== Results summary ====
| Overall | | | | | | | | Home | | | | | | Away | | | | | |
| Pld | W | D | L | GF | GA | GD | Pts | W | D | L | GF | GA | GD | W | D | L | GF | GA | GD |
|---|---|---|---|---|---|---|---|---|---|---|---|---|---|---|---|---|---|---|---|
| 28 | 14 | 6 | 8 | 55 | 34 | +21 | 48 | 9 | 2 | 3 | 30 | 12 | +18 | 5 | 4 | 5 | 25 | 22 | +3 |

Source: Match reports

| Round | 1 | 2 | 3 | 4 | 5 | 6 | 7 | 8 | 9 | 10 | 11 | 12 | 13 | 14 | 15 | 16 | 17 | 18 | 19 | 20 | 21 | 22 | 23 | 24 | 25 | 26 | 27 | 28 |
|---|---|---|---|---|---|---|---|---|---|---|---|---|---|---|---|---|---|---|---|---|---|---|---|---|---|---|---|---|
| Stadium | H | A | H | A | H | A | H | H | A | H | A | A | H | H | H | H | A | A | A | H | A | A | H | H | H | A | A | A |
| Result | W | D | D | D | W | L | W | W | D | D | W | L | L | W | W | W | W | W | W | L | W | D | W | L | W | L | L | L |

Source: Match reports
A = Away; H = Home; W = Win; D = Draw; L = Loss

==== Results ====
| March 28, 2015 1 | Louisville City | 2–0 | Saint Louis FC | Louisville, Kentucky |
| 4:00pm | Rasmussen 23'; Adams 67' | Report | Lynch (yellow card) 69' | Stadium: Louisville Slugger Field; Attendance: 6,067; Referee: Brandon Artis |

| April 4, 2015 2 | Richmond Kickers | 1–1 | Louisville City | Richmond, Virginia |
| 5:00pm | Callahan (yellow card) 20'; Yomby (yellow card) 33'; Robinson (yellow card) 34'; Delicâte 51'; Davis IV (yellow card) 82' | Report | Shanosky (yellow card) 4'; King 35'; Burke (yellow card) 70'; King (yellow card) 78' | Stadium: City Stadium; Attendance: 4,683; Referee: Matthew Franz |

| April 16, 2015 3 | Louisville City | 1–1 | Rochester Rhinos | Louisville, Kentucky |
| 7:30pm | West (yellow card) 20'; Guzman 35' | Report | Ruggles (yellow card) 40'; Dixon 68' | Stadium: Louisville Slugger Field; Attendance: 4,772; Referee: Aaron Hernandez |

| April 19, 2015 4 | Pittsburgh Riverhounds | 1 - 1 | Louisville City | Pittsburgh, Pennsylvania |
| 3:00pm | Okiomah 38' | Report | Guzman (yellow card) 90'; Dacres 92' | Stadium: Highmark Stadium; Attendance: 995; Referee: Tori Penso |

| April 25, 2015 5 | Louisville City | 2 - 0 | Tulsa Roughnecks FC | Louisville, Kentucky |
| 7:30pm | Fondy 22'; Burke (yellow card) 53'; Adams (red card) 54'; Price 89' (o.g.) | Report | TM (yellow card) 56' | Stadium: Louisville Slugger Field; Attendance: 4,877; Referee: Donovan Noocha |

| May 2, 2015 6 | Charlotte Independence | 1 - 0 | Louisville City | Charlotte, North Carolina |
| 7:00pm | DelPiccolo (yellow card) 31'; Cox (yellow card) 45'; Herrera (yellow card) 57'; Slogic 64'; Duckett (yellow card) 71'; Calvert (yellow card) 90' | Report | | Stadium: Ramblewood Soccer Complex; Attendance: 1,987; Referee: Jeremy Smith |

| May 12, 2015 7 | Louisville City | 3 - 0 | Wilmington Hammerheads | Louisville, Kentucky |
| 7:30pm | Rasmussen 15'; Quinn 39'; Shanosky 42'; Burke (yellow card) 45' | Report | Fairclough (yellow card) 25'; Parratt (yellow card) 45'; Arnoux (yellow card) 67' (yellow-red card) 88' | Stadium: Louisville Slugger Field; Attendance: 4,911; Referee: Joshua Brooks |

| May 16, 2015 8 | Louisville City | 4 - 0 | Toronto FC II | Louisville, Kentucky |
| 7:30pm | Dacres 6'; Fondy 14', 55'; Shanosky 35' | Report | | Stadium: Louisville Slugger Field; Attendance: 6,090; Referee: James Dumstorf |

| May 24, 2015 9 | Saint Louis FC | 3 - 3 | Louisville City | Fenton, Missouri |
| 8:30pm | Lynch 20'; Bushue (yellow card) 38'; Gasecki (yellow card) 49'; Ambersley 60'; Gaul (yellow card) 70', (goal) 77'; Kann (yellow card) 80'; Musa (yellow card) 89' | Report | Fondy 29', 74'; Morad (yellow card) 37'; Goodwin (yellow card) 75'; Polak 82'; Rivera (yellow card) 89' | Stadium: St. Louis Soccer Park; Attendance: 4,783; Referee: Brandon Artis |

| May 30, 2015 10 | Louisville City | 1 - 1 | Saint Louis FC | Louisville, Kentucky |
| 7:30pm | Dacres 49'; Montano (yellow card) 80' | Report | Renken 69', (yellow card) 83' | Stadium: Louisville Slugger Field; Attendance: 7,185; Referee: Andrew Musashe |

| June 10, 2015 11 | FC Montreal | 0 - 2 | Louisville City | Montreal, Quebec |
| 6:30pm | | Report | Morad 15'; Fondy 27'; Guzman (yellow card) 68'; Quinn (yellow card) 90+1' | Stadium: Saputo Stadium; Attendance: 308; Referee: Chris Grabas |

| June 13, 2015 12 | Rochester Rhinos | 2 - 0 | Louisville City | Rochester, New York |
| 7:05pm | Walls (yellow card) 23'; Forbes 43'; Duba 67' | Report | Rivera (yellow card) 61' | Stadium: Sahlen's Stadium; Attendance: 6,896; Referee: Jaroslav Werel |

| June 20, 2015 13 | Louisville City | 0 - 2 | New York Red Bulls II | Louisville, Kentucky |
| 7:30pm | Montano (yellow card) 45'; Fernandez (yellow card) 68' | Report | Plewa 3'; Jean-Baptiste (yellow card) 43'; Etienne 49'; Adams (yellow card) 53'; Bedoya (yellow card) 62'; Akinyode (yellow card) 76'; Castano (yellow card) 88' da Fonte (yellow card) 90' | Stadium: Louisville Slugger Field; Attendance: 7,454; Referee: Esteban Rosano |

| June 27, 2015 14 | Louisville City | 6 - 2 | Oklahoma City Energy FC | Louisville, Kentucky |
| 7:30pm | Rasmussen 25', 59' (pen.); Fondy 38', 56', 86' (yellow card) 51'; Quinn (yellow card) 49'; Dacres 66' | Report | Dalgaard 16' (red card) 81'; Gonzalez (yellow card) 44'; König 50' (pen.) (yellow card) 61'; VanCompernolle (yellow card) 61' | Stadium: Louisville Slugger Field; Attendance: 6,646; Referee: Tony Crush |

| July 4, 2015 15 | Louisville City | 3 - 0 | Richmond Kickers | Louisville, Kentucky |
| 7:30pm | Fondy 16'; Morad 50'; Rasmussen 59'; Dacres (yellow card) 72' | Report | Sekyere (yellow card) 79' | Stadium: Louisville Slugger Field; Attendance: 8,254; Referee: Vito Testa Jr |

| July 11, 2015 16 | Louisville City | 1 - 0 | Charlotte Independence | Louisville, Kentucky |
| 7:30pm | Rasmussen 32' (pen.); Morad (yellow card) 40'; Quinn (yellow card) 87' | Report | Martínez (yellow card) 3' | Stadium: Louisville Slugger Field; Attendance: 7,649; Referee: Aaron Hernandez |

| July 18, 2015 17 | Pittsburgh Riverhounds | 1 - 2 | Louisville City | Pittsburgh, Pennsylvania |
| 7:00pm | Vincent (yellow card) 16'; Kerr 19' | Report | Rasmussen 14'; Fondy 65' | Stadium: Highmark Stadium; Attendance: 3,638; Referee: John Douglas |

| July 25, 2015 18 | Wilmington Hammerheads | 1 - 3 | Louisville City | Wilmington, North Carolina |
| 7:00pm | Ackley 23' (pen.) (yellow card) 87'; Parratt (yellow card) 45' | Report | Montano (yellow card) 17'; Fondy 45+1'; Shanosky 51'; Adams 56'; Guzman (yellow card) 87' | Stadium: Legion Stadium; Attendance: 3,373; Referee: Russell Davis |

| August 1, 2015 19 | Toronto FC II | 2 - 3 | Louisville City | Vaughan, Ontario |
| 3:00pm | Babouli 20'; Roberts (yellow card) 67'; Hamilton 80' | Report | Quinn (yellow card) 32'; Dacres 57'; McCabe 66'; Burke 72'; Guzman (yellow card) 90' | Stadium: Ontario Soccer Centre; Attendance: 303; Referee: Alexis Vaughan |

| August 5, 2015 20 | Louisville City | 0 - 4 | FC Montreal | Louisville, Kentucky |
| 7:30pm | Morad (yellow card) 51' | Report | Riggi 3', 18'; Haman 20'; Crépeau (yellow card) 73'; N'Diaye (yellow card) 80'; Morelli 88' | Stadium: Louisville Slugger Field; Attendance: 6,836; Referee: Chris Ruska |

| August 12, 2015 21 | Harrisburg City Islanders | 1 - 5 | Louisville City | Harrisburg, Pennsylvania |
| 7:00pm | Barril 55' | Report | Fondy 1', 12', 43' (pen.), 73'; Dacres 21' | Stadium: Skyline Sports Complex; Attendance: 2,846; Referee: Mark Treilman |

| August 15, 2015 22 | Tulsa Roughnecks FC | 2 - 2 | Louisville City | Tulsa, Oklahoma |
| 8:30pm | Venter 34'; Black (yellow card) 35'; Mata 75' | Report | Cossette (yellow card) 11'; Quinn 18'; Dacres (yellow card) 33'; McCabe 79' | Stadium: ONEOK Field; Attendance: 4,519; Referee: Brook Weiss |

| August 22, 2015 23 | Louisville City | 3 - 1 | Charleston Battery | Louisville, Kentucky |
| 7:30pm | Fondy 44', 82'; Rasmussen 74' (yellow card) 77' | Report | Kelly (yellow card) 48'; Chang 84' | Stadium: Louisville Slugger Field; Attendance: 7,850; Referee: Adam Behrens |

| August 29, 2015 24 | Louisville City | 0 - 1 | Pittsburgh Riverhounds | Louisville, Kentucky |
| 7:30pm | Guzman (yellow card) 29'; Rasmussen (yellow card) 60' | Report | Vincent (yellow card) 17' (goal) 44' (pen.); Hunt (yellow card) 42' | Stadium: Louisville Slugger Field; Attendance: 8,414; Referee: Marco Antonio Vega |

| September 2, 2015 25 | Louisville City | 4 - 0 | Harrisburg City Islanders | Louisville, Kentucky |
| 7:30pm | Fondy 19', 21', 39'; Quinn (yellow card) 77'; Morad (yellow card) 83'; Ilic 90' | Report | Ekra (yellow card) 35'; Dyer (yellow card) 88' | Stadium: Louisville Slugger Field; Attendance: 7,702; Referee: Hilario Grajeda |

| September 5, 2015 26 | New York Red Bulls II | 3 - 2 | Louisville City | New York City, New York |
| 8:30pm | Sanchez 25'; Stolz (yellow card) 55'; Bedoya 70'; Akinyode 85' | Report | McCabe 18' (yellow card) 30'; Fondy 39'; Polak (yellow card) 90' | Stadium: Rocco B. Commisso Soccer Stadium; Attendance: 576; Referee: Hilario Grajeda |

| September 12, 2015 27 | Charleston Battery | 2 - 0 | Louisville City | Charleston, South Carolina |
| 7:30pm | Portillo 63' vanSchaik (yellow card) 78'; Kelly 80'; Marini (yellow card) 89' | Report | Quinn (yellow card) 56'; Shanosky (yellow card) 62' | Stadium: Blackbaud Stadium; Attendance: 3,978; Referee: Rubiel Vazquez |

| September 19, 2015 28 | Saint Louis FC | 2 - 1 | Louisville City | Fenton, Missouri |
| 8:30pm | Hardware 41'; Bryce 76'; Maher (yellow card) 90' | Report | McCabe 10'; Guzman (yellow card) 85'; Montano (yellow card) 90' | Stadium: St. Louis Soccer Park; Attendance: 5,662; Referee: Matthew Kreitzer |

==== Standings ====
Eastern Conference

| Pos | Team | Pld | W | D | L | GF | GA | GD | Pts | Qualification |
|---|---|---|---|---|---|---|---|---|---|---|
| 1 | Rochester Rhinos (C, X) | 28 | 17 | 10 | 1 | 40 | 15 | +25 | 61 | Conference semi-finals |
| 2 | Louisville City FC | 28 | 14 | 6 | 8 | 55 | 34 | +21 | 48 | Conference semi-finals |
| 3 | Charleston Battery | 28 | 12 | 10 | 6 | 43 | 28 | +15 | 46 | First round |
| 4 | New York Red Bulls II | 28 | 12 | 6 | 10 | 46 | 45 | +1 | 42 | First round |
| 5 | Pittsburgh Riverhounds | 28 | 11 | 8 | 9 | 53 | 42 | +11 | 41 | First round |

Source: 2015 USL schedule
Rules for classification: 1) head-to-head; 2) total wins; 3) total goal differential; 4) total goals scored; 5) disciplinary points; 6) away goals scored; 7) away goal differential; 8) home goals scored; 9) home goal differential; 10) coin toss or drawing of lots
(C) Champions; (X) Regular Season League Champion

Western Conference

| Pos | Team | Pld | W | D | L | GF | GA | GD | Pts | Qualification |
|---|---|---|---|---|---|---|---|---|---|---|
| 1 | Orange County Blues | 28 | 14 | 5 | 9 | 38 | 34 | +4 | 47 | Conference semi-finals |
| 2 | Oklahoma City Energy | 28 | 13 | 8 | 7 | 44 | 36 | +8 | 47 | Conference semi-finals |
| 3 | Colorado Springs Switchbacks | 28 | 14 | 4 | 10 | 53 | 35 | +18 | 46 | First round |
| 4 | Sacramento Republic | 28 | 13 | 7 | 8 | 43 | 31 | +12 | 46 | First round |
| 5 | LA Galaxy II | 28 | 14 | 3 | 11 | 39 | 31 | +8 | 45 | First round |
| 6 | Seattle Sounders 2 | 28 | 13 | 3 | 12 | 45 | 42 | +3 | 42 | First round |
| 7 | Tulsa Roughnecks | 28 | 11 | 6 | 11 | 49 | 46 | +3 | 39 | |
| 8 | Portland Timbers 2 | 28 | 11 | 2 | 15 | 38 | 45 | −7 | 35 | |
| 9 | Austin Aztex | 28 | 10 | 3 | 15 | 32 | 41 | −9 | 33 | |
| 10 | Arizona United | 28 | 10 | 2 | 16 | 31 | 55 | −24 | 32 | |
| 11 | Vancouver Whitecaps 2 | 28 | 8 | 6 | 14 | 39 | 53 | −14 | 30 | |
| 12 | Real Monarchs | 28 | 7 | 8 | 13 | 32 | 42 | −10 | 29 | |

Source: 2015 USL schedule
Rules for classification: 1) head-to-head; 2) total wins; 3) total goal differential; 4) total goals scored; 5) disciplinary points; 6) away goals scored; 7) away goal differential; 8) home goals scored; 9) home goal differential; 10) coin toss or drawing of lots

==== USL Playoffs ====
First round
September 26
#4 New York Red Bulls II (a.e.t.) | 4
#5 Pittsburgh Riverhounds | 2
September 26
#3 Charleston Battery (a.e.t.) | 2
#6 Richmond Kickers | 1
September 26
#4 Sacramento Republic FC | 0
#5 LA Galaxy II | 1
September 25
#3 Colorado Springs Switchbacks FC | 2
#6 Seattle Sounders FC 2 | 0

Conference Semifinals
October 3
#1 Rochester Rhinos | 2
#4 New York Red Bulls II | 0
October 3
#2 Louisville City FC (a.e.t.) | 2
#3 Charleston Battery | 0
October 3
#1 Orange County Blues FC | 0
#5 LA Galaxy II | 2
October 4
#2 Oklahoma City Energy FC (p) | 2 (4)
#3 Colorado Springs Switchbacks FC | 2 (3)

Conference Finals
October 10
#1 Rochester Rhinos | 1
#2 Louisville City FC | 0
October 11
#5 LA Galaxy II | 2
#2 Oklahoma City Energy FC | 1

USL Championship
October 16
#1 Rochester Rhinos (a.e.t.) | 2
#5 LA Galaxy II | 1

==== Results ====
| October 3, 2015 Conference Semi-finals | Louisville City | 2 - 0 (a.e.t.) | Charleston Battery | Louisville, Kentucky |
| 7:30pm EST | Burke (yellow card) 41'; Fondy 106', 116' | Report | Kelly (yellow card) 47' | Stadium: Louisville Slugger Field; Attendance: 8,517; Referee: Luis Guardia |

| October 10, 2015 Conference finals | Rochester Rhinos | 1 - 0 (a.e.t.) | Louisville City | Rochester, New York |
| 7:05pm EST | Apostolopolous 22'; McMahon (yellow card) 28'; Forbes (yellow card) 48'; Walls (yellow card) 59'; Dixon (yellow card) 73'; Dos Santos (red card) 54' | Report | Quinn (yellow card) 48' | Stadium: Sahlen's Stadium; Attendance: 5,561; Referee: Matthew Kreitzer |

=== U.S. Open Cup ===
Louisville City entered the 2015 U.S. Open Cup with the rest of the United Soccer League in the second round.

| May 20, 2015 2R | Lansing United (Michigan) | 0–1 | (Kentucky) Louisville City | East Lansing, Michigan |
| 7:00pm EST | DeCosemo (yellow card) 76' | Report | Quinn (yellow card) 32'; Adams 48'; Reynolds (yellow card) 79' | Stadium: East Lansing Soccer Complex; Attendance: 647; Referee: John Douglas |

| May 27, 2015 3R | Indy Eleven (Indiana) | 0–2 (a.e.t.) | (Kentucky) Louisville City | Indianapolis, Indiana |
| 7:30pm EST | Janicki (yellow card) 58'; Wojcik (yellow card) 84' | Report | King (yellow card) 17'; Polak 115'; Rivera 119', (yellow card) 119' | Stadium: Carroll Stadium; Attendance: 7,134; Referee: Elvis Mahmutovic |

| June 16, 2015 4R | Chicago Fire (Illinois) | 1 - 0 (a.e.t.) | (Kentucky) Louisville City | Bridgeview, Illinois |
| 7:30pm CST | Watson (yellow card) 20'; Ritter (yellow card) 71'; Amarikwa 116' | Report | Montano (yellow card) 53'; Guzman (yellow card) 90+4' | Stadium: Toyota Park; Attendance: 3,544; Referee: Nima Saghafi |

== Media ==
As with the rest of the USL, all of Louisville City FC's USL matches will appear on YouTube.

== See also ==
- 2015 in American soccer
- 2015 USL season
- Louisville City FC
- Orlando City SC, Louisville City's Major League Soccer affiliate
