= Larry Jackson =

Larry Jackson may refer to:

- Larry Jackson (baseball), American baseball pitcher
- Larry Jackson (soccer), American soccer player-manager
- Larry Jackson (music executive), American record executive and technologist
- Larry Jackson (racing driver), Canadian racing driver
- Larry Jackson Jr., shot dead by an Austin Police Department detective, see killing of Larry Jackson Jr.
