= Fredericksburg Hotspur =

- Full name: Fredericksburg Hotspur
- Nickname: Hotspurs
- Founded: 2010
- Dissolved: 2014
- Ground: UMW Battleground Stadium; Fredericksburg, Virginia
- Capacity: 1000
- Owner: Matt Galligan
- Head Coach: Jason Kilby
- League: USL Premier Development League
- 2011: 6th, South Atlantic; Playoffs: DNQ
Home colors	Away colors

Fredericksburg Hotspur was an American soccer team based in Fredericksburg, Virginia, United States. Founded in 2010, the team played in the USL Premier Development League (PDL), the fourth tier of the American Soccer Pyramid, in the South Atlantic Division of the Eastern Conference. The team was renamed Fredericksburg FC in 2014.

The team played its home games at the UMW Battleground Stadium on the campus of the University of Mary Washington. The team's colors were red, black and white.

The team was part of the larger Fredericksburg Area Soccer Association, which was a fixture in the Central Virginia soccer scene for more than 30 years, and which began its involvement with USL in 2010 with 10 teams participating in the USL Super Y-League and USL Super-20 League.

== History ==
Fredericksburg Hotspur was announced as a USL Premier Development League expansion franchise on September 16, 2010. The team played its first game on May 7, 2011, a 2-0 loss to the Virginia Beach Piranhas.

In 2014, the team merged with and was rebranded as Fredericksburg FC.

== Players ==
=== 2012 roster ===
2012 Roster

Note: Flags indicate national team as defined under FIFA eligibility rules; some limited exceptions apply. Players may hold more than one non-FIFA nationality.

No.	Pos.	Nation	Player
00	GK	USA	Colin Newcity
1	GK	USA	Ryan Taylor
5	DF	ENG	Nik Rich
2	DF	SUI	Karel Manrau
23	DF	USA	Grant Silvester
4	DF	ENG	Dale Robins-Bailey
25	DF	SEN	Assane Keita
3	DF	CRC	Dennis Castillo
24	DF	USA	Lemuel Lyons
26	DF	USA	Patrick Bain
18	MF	USA	Nate Shiffman
7	MF	USA	Ryan Sappington
22	MF	TRI	Travis Mulraine
19	MF	USA	Don Smart
9	MF	USA	Gene Daniels

No.	Pos.	Nation	Player
8	MF	JAM	Romena Bowie
17	MF	TRI	Evans Wise
14	MF	USA	Matt Truslow
10	MF	MEX	Mario Herrera Meraz
16	MF	USA	Dylan Bowman
13	MF	USA	Jacob Keller
11	MF	USA	Josh West
9	FW	USA	KC Onyeador
21	FW	USA	Ryan Zinkhan
15	FW	SKN	Tishan Hanley
12	MF	USA	Kyle Emerick
—	MF	USA	Chris Dunn
—	DF	USA	Jacob Weiss
—	FW	USA	Demar Stephenson

== Year-by-year ==
Year	Division	League	Regular season	Playoffs	Open Cup
2011	4	USL PDL	6th, South Atlantic	Did not qualify	Did not qualify
2012	4	USL PDL	5th, South Atlantic	Did not qualify	Did not qualify

== Head coach ==
- (United States) Jason Kilby (2012–present)

== Assistant coaches ==
- (Trinidad and Tobago) Travis Mulraine ( 2012–present)
- (United States) Keith Marine (2012–present)

== Stadium ==
- UMW Battleground Stadium at the University of Mary Washington; Fredericksburg, Virginia (2011–present)
