= Travis Mulraine =

Trinidadian footballer (born 1977)

Personal information
- Date of birth: 2 May 1977 (age 49)
- Place of birth: Laventille, Trinidad and Tobago
- Height: 1.79 m (5 ft 10 in)
- Position: Midfielder

Senior career*
Years	Team	Apps	(Gls)
1997–1999	Joe Public		
2000	San Jose Earthquakes	15	(0)
2001	D.C. United	0	(0)
2002–2005	W Connection		
2005	San Juan Jabloteh	3	(1)
2006–2008	Joe Public		
2009	San Juan Jabloteh		
2010–2011	Caledonia AIA		
2011–2012	San Juan Jabloteh		
2012	Fredericksburg Hotspur	3	(0)

International career
1995–2004	Trinidad and Tobago	22	(0)

Managerial career
- 2018: Matura Reunited
- * Club domestic league appearances and goals

Travis Mulraine (born 2 May 1977) is a Trinidadian football coach and former player.

== Early and personal life ==
Born in Laventille, Mulraine attended Queen's Royal College.

== Club career ==
Mulraine played as a midfielder for Joe Public, San Jose Earthquakes, D.C. United, W Connection, San Juan Jabloteh, Caledonia AIA and Fredericksburg Hotspur.

In 2000 he was drafted by the San Jose Earthquakes in the first round of the 2000 Major League Soccer SuperDraft as the eighth overall pick. After being released by San Jose Earthquakes on 13 March 2001 he signed for D.C. United the next day. He was waived 14 days later in a pre-season roster reduction.

In November 2001 he underwent a five-day trial with German club Union Berlin. He initially retired from football after the 2008 season, before returning to former club San Juan Jabloteh in July 2009, taking up a role as a player-coach, before becoming player-coach at Caledonia AIA in February 2010. In 2012 he became a player-coach at Fredericksburg Hotspur.

== International career ==
Mulraine earned 22 caps for the Trinidad and Tobago national team between 1995 and 2005. In November 2002 he became captain of the national team.

== Coaching career ==
In May 2009 he began training as a coach. He began as a player-coach at San Juan Jabloteh later that year, becoming player-coach at Caledonia AIA in February 2010. In 2012 he became a player-coach at Fredericksburg Hotspur. He later managed Matura Reunited, resigning in September 2018.
