= Killing of Larry Jackson Jr. =

Shooting of unarmed Black man by police

Shooting of Larry Jackson Jr.
- Date: July 26, 2013
- Location: Austin, Texas, U.S.
- Deaths: Larry Jackson Jr.
- Accused: Charles Kleinert
- Charges: Manslaughter
- Verdict: Charge dropped by judge
- Litigation: $1.25 million lawsuit filed against City by family settled

On July 26, 2013, 32-year-old Larry Jackson Jr. was shot dead by Austin Police Department Detective Charles Kleinert in Austin, Texas, United States. Jackson was at the scene of a bank robbery earlier that day in central Austin. When questioned by Kleinert as to why he falsely identified himself to a bank employee, Jackson ran. When Kleinert caught up to Jackson a struggle between Jackson and Detective Charles Kleinert ensued. One gunshot was fired, fatally striking Jackson in the back of the neck.

Kleinert was indicted by a grand jury on the charge of manslaughter. In October 2015, a judge dropped the charge against Kleinert.

== Details ==
As Kleinert was questioning Jackson concerning why he identified himself to bank employees as a different bank customer and requested access to the account, Jackson ran. Kleinert chased Jackson, enlisted the aid of a passing motorist, and followed on foot under a bridge where a struggle took place. Kleinert's weapon unintentionally discharged striking Jackson in the back of the neck. Kleinert reported that the shooting was accidental. Jackson did not have a weapon on him but had not been searched before running.

== Aftermath ==
After the incident, Kleinert retired from the police force. He was indicted for manslaughter in May 2014. The Austin City Council approved a $1.25 million settlement to Jackson's children in August 2014. Austin Attorney Bobby Taylor represented the children of Larry Jackson. In October 2015, after being removed to federal court a federal judge ruled that Kleinert, a member of an FBI task force, was acting in his capacity as a federal officer. The judge dismissed the case with prejudice asserting the Supremacy Clause applied.

== See also ==
- List of unarmed African Americans killed by law enforcement officers in the United States
