= Fran Martínez =

Spanish footballer

Personal information
- Full name: Francisco Martínez García
- Date of birth: 9 September 1995 (age 31)
- Place of birth: Elche, Spain
- Height: 6 ft 0 in (1.83 m)
- Position: Defender

Team information
- Current team: Crevillente

Youth career
- –2013: Hércules

Senior career*
Years	Team	Apps	(Gls)
2011–2013	Hércules B	8	(0)
2013–2014	Valencia B	1	(0)
2014–2015	Real Murcia Imperial		
2015	Valencia B	0	(0)
2015–2016	Wilmington Hammerheads	21	(0)
2016	Alcoyano	1	(0)
2016–2017	Real Jaén	0	(0)
2017–2018	Orihuela	0	(0)
2018	Elche Ilicitano	10	(0)
2019	Lorca	18	(1)
2019–2020	Independiente Alicante		
2021–2022	Torrellano	34	(0)
2022–2024	Callosa Deportiva		
2024–	Crevillente	6	(0)
- * Club domestic league appearances and goals as of 13 October 2024

Francisco "Fran" Martínez García (born 9 September 1995) is a Spanish footballer who plays for Crevillente.

== Career ==
=== Professional ===
After spending time in Spain with Valencia B and Real Murcia, Martínez trialled with MLS side New York City FC. However, he later signed with NYCFC's United Soccer League affiliate club Wilmington Hammerheads on 22 April 2015.
