= Juan Guzmán (footballer) =

Colombian footballer

Personal information
- Full name: Juan Pablo Guzmán Perdomo
- Date of birth: August 31, 1988 (age 38)
- Place of birth: Bogotá, Colombia
- Height: 5 ft 9 in (1.75 m)
- Position: Defensive midfielder

College career
Years	Team	Apps	(Gls)
2006–2009	Liberty Flames	64	(6)

Senior career*
Years	Team	Apps	(Gls)
2007	Southern California Seahorses	11	(0)
2010–2014	Charlotte Eagles	91	(4)
2015	Louisville City	27	(1)
2016	Patriotas	0	(0)
2017–2018	Oklahoma City Energy	29	(2)
2019–2021	New Mexico United	66	(0)
- * Club domestic league appearances and goals as of December 12, 2021

Juan Pablo Guzmán (born August 31, 1988) is a Colombian soccer player. He mainly operates as a defensive midfielder.

== Career ==
=== Youth and college ===
Guzmán attended Charlotte Latin School, where he was member of the NSCAA/Adidas youth All-America team while leading his team to a North Carolina Independent Schools Athletic Association (NCISAA) state championship in 2004.

Guzmán went on to play four years of college soccer at Liberty University, where he was twice selected to NSCAA All-South Atlantic Region team as a sophomore in 2007 and as a junior in 2008.

During his college years Guzmán also played for the Southern California Seahorses in the USL Premier Development League.

=== Professional ===
Guzmán turned professional in 2010 when he signed for USL Second Division side Charlotte Eagles. He made his professional debut for them on July 3, in a game against Harrisburg City Islanders.

He scored his first goal for Louisville City FC in Slugger Field v Rochester Rhinos on April 16, 2015.

His contract with Louisville City was terminated by mutual consent on January 28, 2016, so that he could sign with Colombian side Patriotas F.C.

== Career statistics ==
As of match played November 8, 2021

Appearances by season, club, and competition
Club	Season	League			Domestic Cup		League Cup		Total	
Club	Season	Division	Apps	Goals	Apps	Goals	Apps	Goals	Apps	Goals
Charlotte Eagles	2010	USL Second Division	6	0	0	0	—		6	0
Charlotte Eagles	2011	USL Pro	20	0	1 (Note: Appearance(s) in the US Open Cup)	0	—		21	0
Charlotte Eagles	2012	USL Pro	22	2	3	1	—		25	3
Charlotte Eagles	2013	USL Pro	21	0	1	0	2 (Note: Appearance(s) in USL Pro Playoffs)	0	24	0
Charlotte Eagles	2014	USL Pro	23	2	1	1	—		24	3
Charlotte Eagles	Total		92	4	6	2	2	0	100	6
Louisville City	2015	USL	27	1	2	0	2 (Note: Appearance(s) in USL playoffs)	0	31	1
Patriotas Boyacá	2016	Categoria Primera A	0	0	4 (Note: Appearance(s) in the Copa Colombia)	0	—		4	0
OKC Energy	2017	USL	23	2	3	0	2	0	28	2
OKC Energy	2018	USL	6	0	0	0	—		6	0
OKC Energy	Total		29	2	3	0	2	0	34	2
New Mexico United	2019	USL Championship	28	0	4	0	1 (Note: Appearance(s) in USL Championship playoffs)	0	33	0
New Mexico United	2020	USL Championship	13	0	—		2	0	15	0
New Mexico United	2021	USL Championship	25	0	—		—		25	0
New Mexico United	Total		66	0	4	0	3	0	73	0
Career total			211	7	19	2	9	0	239	9
