= Ricky Burke =

Scottish footballer

Personal information
- Full name: Richard Burke
- Date of birth: 7 July 1990 (age 36)
- Place of birth: England
- Height: 1.80 m (5 ft 11 in)
- Position: Midfielder

Youth career
- D.C. United

Senior career*
Years	Team	Apps	(Gls)
2008–2009	Lothian Thistle Hutchison Vale		
2009–2010	Vale of Leithen		
2010–2011	Heriot-Watt University		
2011–2013	Musselburgh Athletic		
2013–2014	Livingston	0	(0)
2014	Northern Virginia Royals	12	(0)
2015	Richmond Kickers	2	(0)
- * Club domestic league appearances and goals as of April 11, 2015

Richard Burke (born 7 July 1990) is a Scottish footballer who previously played in the United States for Richmond Kickers in the United Soccer League.
