= Austin Martz =

American soccer player

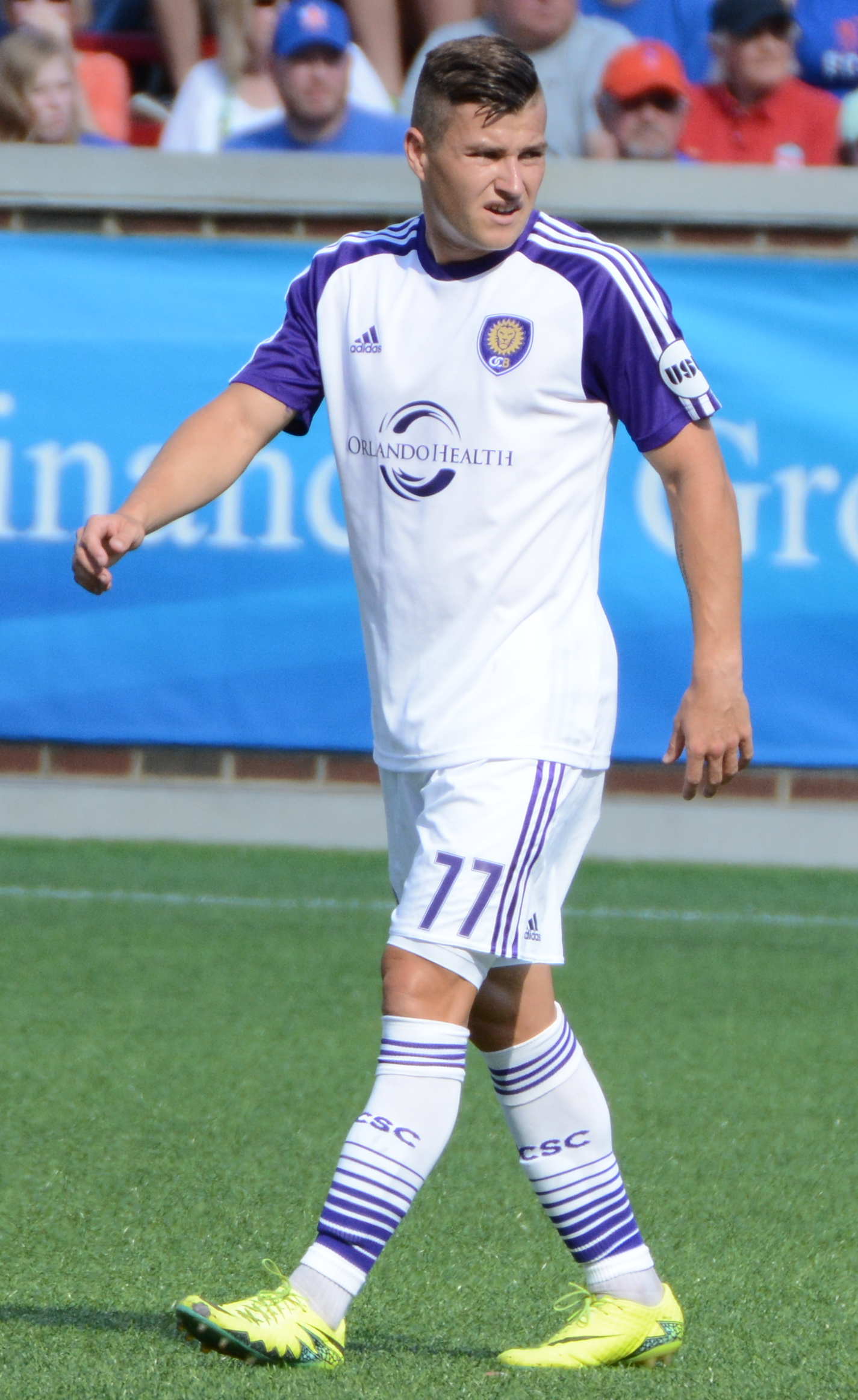
- Martz playing for Orlando City B in 2017

Personal information
- Date of birth: May 31, 1992 (age 34)
- Place of birth: Mechanicsburg, Pennsylvania, U.S.
- Height: 1.67 m (5 ft 6 in)
- Positions: Midfielder; forward

College career
Years	Team	Apps	(Gls)
2011–2014	Georgetown Hoyas	74	(4)

Senior career*
Years	Team	Apps	(Gls)
2013–2015	Baltimore Bohemians	21	(7)
2015	Pembroke Athleta	16	(5)
2016	Wilmington Hammerheads	26	(4)
2017	Orlando City B	30	(2)
2018–2019	Saint Louis FC	21	(0)
- * Club domestic league appearances and goals as of June 30, 2019

Austin Martz (born May 31, 1992) is an American former soccer player.

== College career ==
Martz spent his entire college career at Georgetown University. He made a total of 74 appearances for the Hoyas.

He appeared for Premier Development League side Baltimore Bohemians in 2013, 2014 and 2015.

== Professional career ==
After various trials, including one at New York Red Bulls II and spells in Scandinavia, Martz signed with Maltese Premier League side Pembroke Athleta in August 2015.

Martz signed with United Soccer League (USL) side Wilmington Hammerheads on February 9, 2016. Martz joined USL side Orlando City B on December 6, 2016. Martz joined USL side Saint Louis FC on December 12, 2017.
