= Nate Shiffman =

American soccer player and entrepreneur

Personal information
- Full name: Nathan Shiffman
- Date of birth: December 9, 1991 (age 34)
- Place of birth: Richmond, Virginia, United States
- Height: 1.73 m (5 ft 8 in)
- Position: Midfielder

Youth career
- 2008–2009: Richmond Strikers
- 2010–2013: VCU Rams

Senior career*
Years	Team	Apps	(Gls)
2012	Fredericksburg Hotspur	9	(2)
2013	RVA FC	1	(0)
2014	Oklahoma City Energy	22	(1)
2015–2016	Richmond Kickers	11	(1)
- * Club domestic league appearances and goals as of April 3, 2016

Nathan Shiffman (born December 9, 1991) is an American professional soccer player and entrepreneur.

== Career ==
=== Early career ===
Shiffman played college soccer at Virginia Commonwealth University between 2010 and 2013. While at college he also appeared for USL PDL club Fredericksburg Hotspur in 2012.

=== Professional ===
Shiffman signed his first professional contract with USL Pro club Oklahoma City Energy on February 4, 2014. In his first season, Shiffman was a regular starter, playing in 22 of the 28 USL Pro matches. Ahead of the 2015 season, Shiffman signed with his hometown team, the Richmond Kickers on a one-year deal.
