= Kyle Parker (soccer) =

American soccer player (born 1993)

Personal information
- Date of birth: December 17, 1993 (age 32)
- Place of birth: Columbus, Ohio, United States
- Height: 5 ft 10 in (1.78 m)
- Position: Forward

College career
Years	Team	Apps	(Gls)
2012–2015	Charlotte 49ers	78	(34)

Senior career*
Years	Team	Apps	(Gls)
2016	Wilmington Hammerheads	23	(3)
- * Club domestic league appearances and goals as of September 25, 2016

Kyle Parker (born December 17, 1993) is an American soccer player who most recently played for the Wilmington Hammerheads in the USL.

== Career ==
=== Amateur ===
Parker spent his youth career at the Charlotte Soccer Academy. He attended Marvin Ridge High School in Waxhaw, North Carolina.

=== College ===
Parker spent his entire college career at the University of North Carolina at Charlotte. He made a total of 78 appearances for the 49ers and tallied 34 goals and 15 assists.

=== Professional ===
On January 14, 2016, Parker was selected in the second round (31st overall) of the 2016 MLS SuperDraft by Columbus Crew. He wasn't signed permanently by Columbus, and instead signed with United Soccer League club Wilmington Hammerheads on March 24, 2016.
