= Larry Jackson (soccer) =

American soccer player and manager

Personal information
- Date of birth: September 28, 1990 (age 36)
- Place of birth: San Francisco, California, United States
- Height: 6 ft 1 in (1.85 m)
- Position: Goalkeeper

Youth career
- IMG Academy

College career
| Years | Team | Apps | (Gls) |
| 2009–2012 | Santa Clara Broncos | | |

Senior career*
| Years | Team | Apps | (Gls) |
| 2014 | New England Revolution | 0 | (0) |
| 2015 | Wilmington Hammerheads | 5 | (0) |
| 2016 | Burlingame Dragons | 1 | (0) |
| 2018 | Fresno FC | 0 | (0) |
| 2019 | Oakland Roots | 3 | (0) |

Managerial career
- 2017: Cal State East Bay Pioneers (men's & women's asst.)
- 2019: Oakland Roots (asst.)
- * Club domestic league appearances and goals as of August 31, 2019

Larry Jackson (born September 28, 1990) is an American soccer player-manager who last played and assistant managed for Oakland Roots SC in the National Independent Soccer Association.

== Career ==
=== College and amateur ===
Jackson played college soccer at Santa Clara University between 2009 and 2012.

=== Professional ===
Jackson went undrafted in the 2013 MLS SuperDraft, later trialing with Colorado Rapids. He signed his first professional contract with MLS club New England Revolution on April 9, 2014. He was released by the club on December 8, 2014.

Jackson signed with USL side Wilmington Hammerheads on March 3, 2015.

On July 15, 2019, Jackson joined Oakland Roots as a player-coach.
