= William Heaney =

English footballer

Personal information
- Date of birth: 6 June 1990 (age 36)
- Place of birth: Maryport, Cumbria, England
- Position: Midfielder

Youth career
- 2002–2007: Newcastle United
- 2007–2008: Carlisle United

Senior career*
Years	Team	Apps	(Gls)
2010–2012	Gretna 2008		
2013–2015	Wilmington Hammerheads	45	(5)
2013	→ Workington (loan)	1	(0)
- * Club domestic league appearances and goals as of 21 September 2015

William Heaney (born 6 June 1990) is an English former footballer who played as a midfielder. He now works as a developmental player program director at Wilmington Hammerheads.

== Career ==
Heaney was born in Maryport, Cumbria. He played with Scottish club Gretna 2008 from 2010 to 2012. Prior to Gretna, Heaney played for the academies of Newcastle United and Carlisle United.

Heaney signed with USL Pro club Wilmington Hammerheads on 12 April 2013 and played there until October 2013. He joined after the end of the USL Pro Season to Cumbria-based Workington and played only one game, before he returned on 3 March 2014 to Wilmington.

After three years playing for Wilmington, he was appointed as Developmental Player Program Director at the club in August 2018.
