= Ramblewood Soccer Complex =

Sports complex in Charlotte, North Carolina

- Interactive map of Ramblewood Soccer Complex
- Location: 10200 Nations Ford Rd; Charlotte, NC 28273
- Coordinates: 35.12628°N 80.90687°W
- Operator: Ramblewood Soccer, Inc.
- Capacity: 4,700
- Surface: Grass
- Field size: 120 x 75 yards

Construction
- Opened: 1993 (complex); 2015 (stadium)
- Demolished: 2017 (stadium)

Tenant
- Charlotte Independence (USL) (2015–2017)

Ramblewood Soccer Complex is a volunteer maintained sports complex consisting of eleven soccer fields, located in Charlotte, North Carolina. The complex features a 4,300-seat soccer-specific stadium, which had been home to the Charlotte Independence soccer club since 2015. The stadium was built beginning in 2014, although the complex as a whole dates back to 1993.

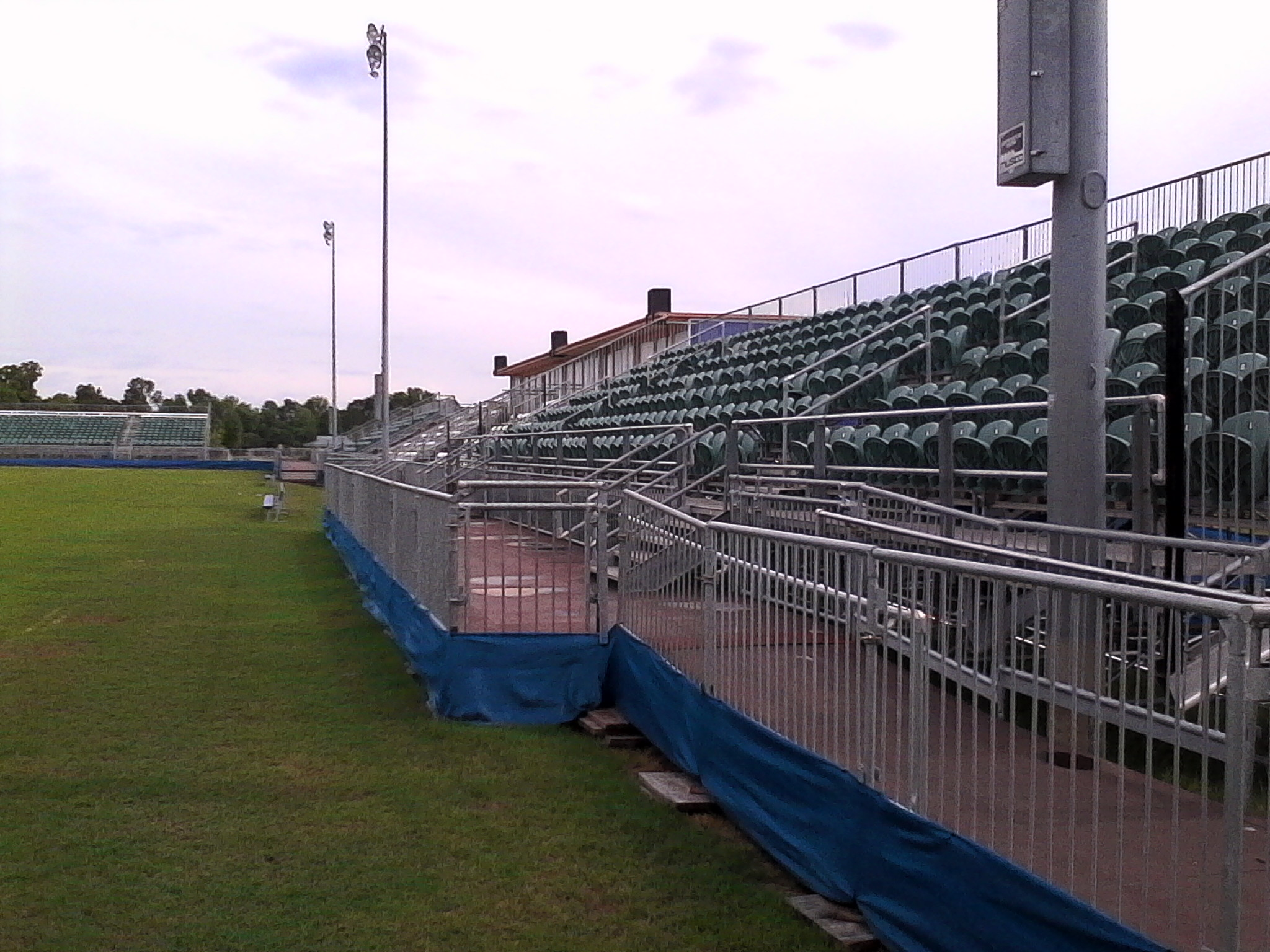
A temporary stand at Ramblewood Park
