= Matthew Fondy =

American soccer player (born 1989)

Personal information
- Full name: Matthew Ryan Fondy
- Date of birth: July 28, 1989 (age 37)
- Place of birth: Foster City, California, United States
- Height: 6 ft 1 in (1.85 m)
- Position: Forward

Team information
- Current team: International San Francisco

College career
| Years | Team | Apps | (Gls) |
| 2007–2010 | UC Santa Cruz Banana Slugs | | |

Senior career*
| Years | Team | Apps | (Gls) |
| 2011 | Pittsburgh Riverhounds | 22 | (2) |
| 2012–2013 | Los Angeles Blues | 29 | (14) |
| 2013–2014 | Chivas USA | 8 | (0) |
| 2014 | Chicago Fire | 8 | (0) |
| 2015 | Louisville City | 28 | (22) |
| 2016 | Jacksonville Armada | 8 | (0) |
| 2016–2017 | North Carolina FC | 40 | (13) |
| 2018 | Oakland Leopards | | |
| 2019 | San Francisco City | 3 | (4) |
| 2019 | Olympic Club | | |
| 2020 | Oakland Roots | 8 | (5) |
| 2021–2022 | Oakland SC | | |
| 2022– | Inter San Francisco | 20 | (21) |

International career
| 2022 | United States Maccabiah futsal | | |
- * Club domestic league appearances and goals as of October 15, 2022

Matthew Ryan Fondy (born July 28, 1989) is an American soccer player who currently plays for Inter San Francisco in the San Francisco Soccer Football League.

== Career ==
=== College and amateur ===
Fondy attended Burlingame High School and played four years of college soccer at the University of California Santa Cruz, where he was a 2009 NSCAA Division III All-American - Third Team

=== Professional ===
Though undrafted out of college, Fondy turned professional in 2011 when he signed with the Pittsburgh Riverhounds of the USL Pro league, and made his professional debut on April 9, 2011, in a game against Richmond Kickers. He scored his first professional goal on May 21, 2011, in a 2–0 win against F.C. New York.

Fondy signed with Los Angeles Blues of USL Pro on January 13, 2012. On August 30, 2013, he transferred to Chivas USA of Major League Soccer.

After a stint with Chicago Fire in 2014, Fondy signed with Louisville City of the USL in January 2015. He scored his first goal for Louisville City against the Tulsa Roughnecks at Slugger Field on April 25.

On September 2, 2015, Fondy set a new USL single season goal scoring record with a hat trick against Harrisburg in a 4–0 win, giving him 21 goals on the season.

Fondy transferred to Jacksonville Armada in February 2016.

On June 27, 2016, the Carolina RailHawks, later North Carolina FC, announced that Fondy had been acquired from Jacksonville Armada.

Fondy joined Oakland Roots SC in January 2020. He had previously featured for the Roots' amateur affiliate, the Oakland Leopards.

== Honors ==
Individual

- USL Most Valuable Player: 2015
- USL Golden Boot: 2015
- USL Scoring Champion: 2015
- USL All League First Team: 2015

== Retirement ==
Although no longer in his playing career, Fondy has stayed heavily involved in the sport. Together with Cody Pillon, Fondy co-founded Oakland Genesis, a cost-free youth club in Oakland, CA who view soccer as a tool to empower, educate, and inspire Oakland's leaders of tomorrow. The club provide competitive coaching, academic support, and transportation for all of their players, free of cost. In addition to co-founding the club, Fondy is a coach for some of the program's boys' teams.

Fondy has remained actively playing for various San Francisco Bay Area amateur clubs. Including Oakland SC of the National Premier Soccer League, San Francisco Metro, and Inter San Francisco.

Fondy also represented the United States in futsal at the 2022 Maccabiah Games, alongside former Louisville City teammate Guy Abend.
