= Jason Yeisley =

American soccer player (born 1986)

Personal information
- Full name: Jason Gerard Yeisley
- Date of birth: September 30, 1986 (age 40)
- Place of birth: Hershey, Pennsylvania, U.S.
- Height: 6 ft 1 in (1.85 m)
- Position: Forward

College career
Years	Team	Apps	(Gls)
2005–2009	Penn State Nittany Lions		

Senior career*
Years	Team	Apps	(Gls)
2006	Reading United	9	(2)
2009	Reading United	5	(1)
2010	FC Dallas	5	(0)
2011	Pittsburgh Riverhounds	22	(5)
2012–2016	Richmond Kickers	99	(21)
- * Club domestic league appearances and goals as of September 24, 2016

Jason Yeisley (born September 30, 1986) is a former professional soccer player.

== Career ==
=== College and amateur ===
Yeisley grew up in Allentown, Pennsylvania and attended Salisbury High School, where he set a school record for career goals with 153, and was named the 2004 Lehigh Valley Soccer Scholar-Athlete, and was a two time PSCA All-State and NSCAA All-East Region II mention 2003 and 2004

He played four years of college soccer at Pennsylvania State University from 2005 to 2009 (redshirted 2008 season). He excelled his freshman year. He was named to the All-Big Ten Second Team, the Big Ten All-Freshman Team, the Soccer America All-Freshman First Team, the College Soccer News All-Freshman Second Team, the Penn State Classic All-Tournament Team, and was the Big Ten Championship's Offensive Most Valuable Player as a freshman in 2005. Suffering several severe injuries following his freshman year, he played little over the next three seasons, however came back for a super senior year to another successful season.

He served as his team's captain for three years from 2007 to 2009, and following his senior year was a Soccer News Net Regional and National Player of the Year Award nominee, was a Soccer America National Player of the Year candidate, was named the Big Ten Offensive Player of the Year, and received All-Big Ten First Team, CoSIDA ESPN The Magazine Academic All-District First Team, Penn State Classic All-Tournament Team honors. He was also the winner of the 2009 Lowe's Senior CLASS Award for men's soccer.

During his college years Yeisley also played for Reading Rage in the USL Premier Development League in 2006 and 2009.

=== Professional ===
Yeisley was drafted in the third round (38th overall) of the 2010 MLS SuperDraft by FC Dallas. He made his professional debut on April 22, 2010, in a game against Seattle Sounders FC.

After one season with FC Dallas, Yeisley was waived on February 14, 2011. He signed with Pittsburgh Riverhounds of the USL Pro league on March 29, 2011. He scored his first two professional goals on May 31, 2011, in a 4–2 loss in the Pennsylvania Derby to the Harrisburg City Islanders.

On December 6, 2011, Yeisley signed a long-term deal with the Richmond Kickers
