= Legion Stadium (North Carolina) =

Stadium in Wilmington, North Carolina

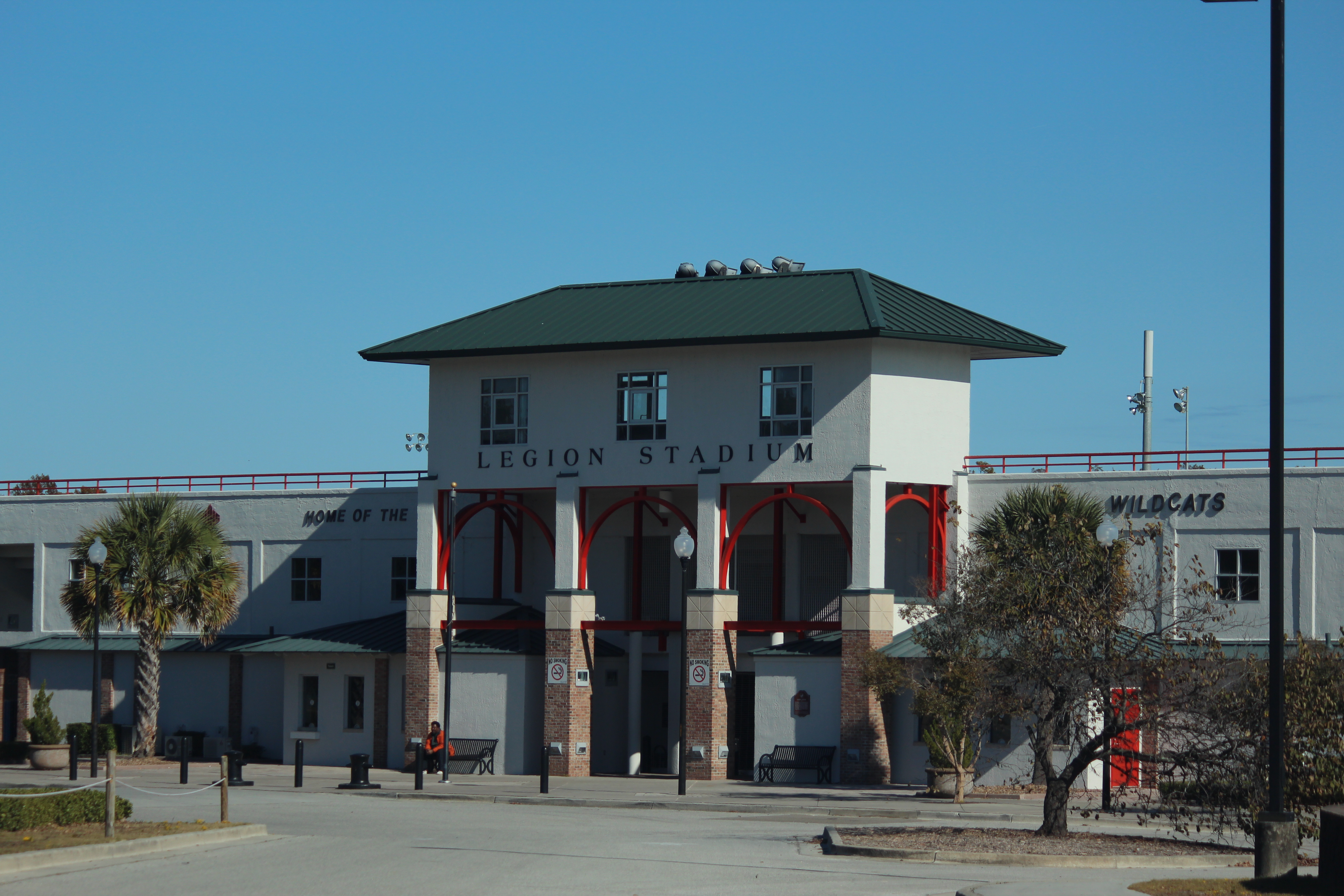
- Interactive map of Legion Stadium
- Location: Wilmington, North Carolina
- Coordinates: 34°12′7″N 77°56′17″W
- Capacity: 6,000
- Surface: FieldTurf

Construction
- Opened: 1930s
- Renovated: 2011

Tenant
- Wilmington Hammerheads FC (USL/PDL) (2003–2009, 2011–2016)

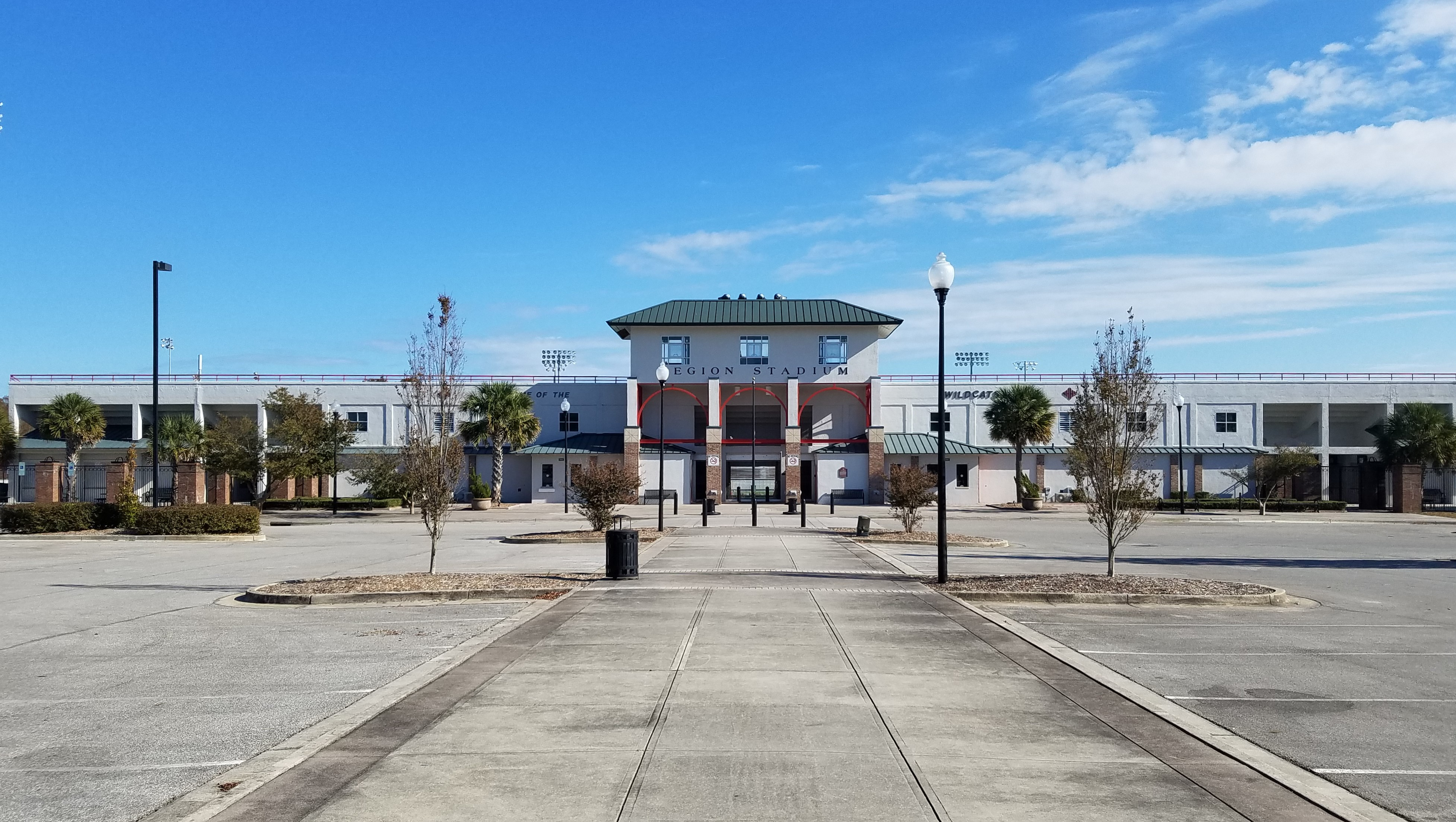
Front side of Legion Stadium

Legion Stadium is a 6,000 seat stadium located in Wilmington, North Carolina. It was the home of the Wilmington Hammerheads of the USL Premier Development League until 2016. The stadium is part of the Legion Sports Complex, which also includes a baseball field, tennis courts, and a pool.

Originally built in the 1930s, the facility received several renovations over the years, the most recent of which was completed in 2011. The stadium has 3,500 seats in the grandstand and 2,500 visitor seats. It also has 40 handicapped seats and a 4-acre (16,000 m^{2}) parking lot.
