= Tom Parratt =

Scottish footballer

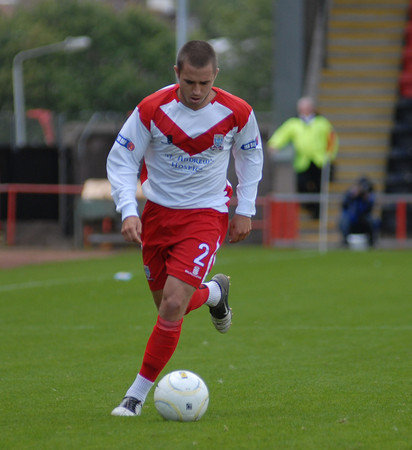
- Paratt playing for Airdrie United in 2010

Personal information
- Date of birth: 2 March 1986 (age 40)
- Place of birth: Inverness, Scotland
- Positions: Full back; midfielder

Youth career
- 1995–2001: Iowa City Alliance
- 2001–2005: Birmingham City

Senior career*
Years	Team	Apps	(Gls)
2005–2006	Inverness Caledonian Thistle	0	(0)
2006–2008	Hamilton Academical	46	(0)
2008–2009	Queen of the South	9	(0)
2009–2010	Airdrie United	14	(0)
2011–2016	Wilmington Hammerheads	120	(4)

International career
2003–2004	Scotland U18	4	(0)
2004–2005	Scotland U19	11	(0)
- * Club domestic league appearances and goals

Tom Parratt (born 2 March 1986) is a Scottish former professional footballer who most recently played for the Wilmington Hammerheads in the United Soccer League.

== Early life ==
Parratt was born in Inverness, Scotland, but moved to the United States with his family at the age of three. He grew up in Iowa City, Iowa and attended Iowa City High School. He played club football for Iowa City Alliance, where his father Ian is Director of Coaching, and attended the US National U-14 training camp.

== Club career ==
=== Birmingham City ===
At the age of 15, Parratt moved to England to join Birmingham City, and after a year's acclimatisation began a three-year scholarship programme with Birmingham's Academy. During his time with Birmingham he played for the Scotland under-19 team.

=== Inverness Caledonian Thistle ===
Released by Birmingham at the end of the 2004–05 season, Parratt returned to the place of his birth to join Inverness Caledonian Thistle of the Scottish Premier League (SPL) on a two-and-a-half-year contract. He was primarily used as a substitute, and made his debut as a second-half substitute in the Scottish League Cup against Alloa Athletic.

=== Hamilton Academical ===
Released by the club at the end of the 2005–06 season, he signed for Hamilton Academical in August 2006, and established himself as the club's first-choice right back. The following year he was an integral part of the impressive 2007–08 season title winning team, and part of a defence that only conceded three goals at home the entire season.

=== Queen of the South ===
On 27 August 2008 Parratt joined First Division side Queen of the South of Dumfries. He made his debut playing in the 3–1 home league defeat of Dundee on 30 August. He left Queen of the South at the end of January 2009 wishing to pursue options elsewhere.

=== Airdrie United ===
In August 2009 Parratt returned to Scotland joined Airdrie United. Following the 2009–10 season he returned to America.

=== Wilmington Hammerheads ===
Parratt turned to the United States in 2011 and signed with Wilmington Hammerheads of the USL Pro division.

Wilmington re-signed Parratt for the 2012 season on 13 February 2012.

== International career ==
Following impressive performances for Birmingham City's Reserves, he was called up to the Scotland under-19 team playing 15 times and was the only player to start every game in 2005.

== Honours ==
Hamilton Academical

- Scottish Football League First Division: 2007–08
