= 2015 Rochester Rhinos season =

Rochester Rhinos
2015 season
- Owner: Rob Clark
- Head coach: Bob Lilley
- Stadium: Sahlen's Stadium
- USL: 1st, Eastern Conference
- USL Playoffs: USL Champions
- U.S. Open Cup: Fourth Round
- Top goalscorer: League: Christian Volesky (8); All: Steevan Dos Santos (9)
- Highest home attendance: 6,922 (July 26 vs. Charleston)
- Lowest home attendance: 4,251 (July 8 vs. Montreal)
- Average home league attendance: League: 5,599; All: 5,556
Home colors	Away colors

The 2015 Rochester Rhinos season was the club's twentieth season. It was the Rhinos fifth-consecutive year in the third tier of American soccer, playing in the United Soccer League Eastern Conference. The Rhinos finished the regular season in first place, clinching the #1 seed and home field advantage in the 2015 USL Playoffs. The Rhinos won the USL Championship, the club's 5th overall, by defeating LA Galaxy II 2–1 after extra time.

== Background ==
The Rhinos debuted a new commemorative logo to be used during the 2015 season celebrating the twentieth anniversary of the club's founding.

The Rhinos started the season on a record nineteen game undefeated streak, after finishing the prior season in 6th place.

== Competitions ==
=== Friendlies ===
March 6, 2015 Preseason	Rochester Rhinos	6 - 1	Niagara Purple Eagles	North Chili, New York
6:00 PM ET	Totsch; Ugarte; Samuels; Rolfe, Volesky 80'	Report	Ferguson	Stadium: Roberts Wesleyan College

March 8, 2015 Preseason	Rochester Rhinos	3 - 0	Buffalo Bulls	North Chili, New York
	Volesky 23'; Duba 40'; Tsoulakos 59'	Report		Stadium: Roberts Wesleyan College

March 13, 2015 Preseason	Ottawa Fury FC	1 - 1	Rochester Rhinos	Rochester, New York
	DeBellis (red card) 25'; Haworth 75'	Report	Lanteri 20'	Stadium: Sahlen's Stadium

March 15, 2015 Preseason	Rochester Rhinos	0 - 0	Cornell Big Red	Rochester, New York
3:00 PM ET		Report		Stadium: Sahlen's Stadium

March 20, 2015 Preseason	Rochester Rhinos	4 - 0	Syracuse Orange	Rochester, New York
2:30 PM ET	Rolfe 2'; Ringhof 12'; Walls 35'; Duba 55'	Report		Stadium: Sahlen's Stadium

June 11, 2015 RCSD School Day Soccer Game	Rochester Rhinos	3 - 0	FC Buffalo	Rochester, New York
ET	Samuels 8'; Ruggles 56'; Forbes 74'	Report		Stadium: Sahlen's Stadium; Attendance: 5,000+
Note: 80-minute match

=== USL ===
March 28, 2015 Match 1	New York Red Bulls II	0 - 0	Rochester Rhinos	Harrison, NJ
2:00 PM ET		Report	Garzi (yellow card) 31'; Rolfe (yellow card) 42'; Ringhof (yellow card) 79'	Stadium: Red Bull Arena; Attendance: 547; Referee: Ryan Dos Reis

April 4, 2015 Match 2	Pittsburgh Riverhounds	1 - 2	Rochester Rhinos	Pittsburgh, PA
7:00 PM ET	Arena (yellow card) 37'; Touloute 48'; Earls (yellow card) 67'	Report	McMahon (yellow card) 23'; Walls 27'; Volesky (yellow card) 45'; Dixon 50'; Silva (yellow card) 77'	Stadium: Highmark Stadium; Attendance: 2,274; Referee: Vito Testa Jr.

April 11, 2015 Match 3	FC Montreal	0 - 3	Rochester Rhinos	Montreal, Quebec
2:30 PM ET	Dinkota (yellow card) 57'; Lajoie-Gravelle (yellow card) 60'; Zoue (red card) 63'; Charbonneau (yellow card) 88'	Report	Rolfe (yellow card) 6'; Mendoza 33'; Volesky 67', 69'; McMahon (yellow card) 87'	Stadium: Saputo Stadium; Attendance: 258

April 16, 2015 Match 4	Louisville City FC	1 - 1	Rochester Rhinos	Louisville, KY
7:30 PM ET	West (yellow card) 20'; Guzman 34'	Report	Dixon 21'; Ruggles (yellow card) 40'	Stadium: Louisville Slugger Field; Attendance: 4,772; Referee: Aaron Hernandez

April 18, 2015 Match 5	Saint Louis FC	0 - 1	Rochester Rhinos	Fenton, MO
8:30 PM CT	Gaul (yellow card) 37'	Report	Rolfe 77'	Stadium: World Wide Technology Soccer Park; Attendance: 5,001; Referee: Cedric Adams

April 26, 2015 Match 6	Rochester Rhinos	2 - 0	New York Red Bulls II	Rochester, NY
2:05 PM ET	Obasi (yellow card) 9'; Dixon 39'; Garzi (yellow card) 83'	Report	Jean-Baptiste (yellow card) 78'; Etienne (yellow card) 89'	Stadium: Sahlen's Stadium; Attendance: 6,184; Referee: Brandon Artis

May 2, 2015 Match 7	FC Montreal	1 - 2	Rochester Rhinos	Montreal, Quebec
4:00 PM ET	Gagnon (yellow card) 17'; Riggi 87'	Report	Walls (yellow card) 27'; Volesky 56', 63'; Ringhof (yellow card) 71'; Mendoza (yellow card) 76'	Stadium: Saputo Stadium; Attendance: 330

May 9, 2015 Match 8	Rochester Rhinos	1 - 0	Toronto FC II	Rochester, NY
7:05 PM ET	Van De Casteele (yellow card) 58'; Duba 90'	Report	Edwards (yellow card) 49'; Babouli (yellow card) 87' (yellow-red card) 89'	Stadium: Sahlen's Stadium; Attendance: 5,179; Referee: David Mon

May 16, 2015 Match 9	Wilmington Hammerheads	1 - 1	Rochester Rhinos	Wilmington, NC
7:00 PM ET	Rolfe (yellow card) 70'; Duba 90'	Report	Fairclough 90+'	Stadium: Legion Stadium; Attendance: 2,781; Referee: Doug Hartemann

May 23, 2015 Match 10	Toronto FC II	0 - 0	Rochester Rhinos	Toronto, Ontario
12:00 PM ET		Report	Garzi (yellow card) 69'	Stadium: BMO Field; Attendance: 986

May 30, 2015 Match 11	Rochester Rhinos	1 - 0	FC Montreal	Rochester, NY
7:05 PM ET	Volesky (yellow card) 8'; Duba 9'	Report	Alessandro (yellow card) 34'; Hocine (yellow card) 37'; Morelli (red card) 46'; Ndiaye (yellow card) 88'	Stadium: Sahlen's Stadium; Attendance: 4,487; Referee: Vito Testa, Jr.

June 13, 2015 Match 12	Rochester Rhinos	2 - 0	Louisville City FC	Rochester, NY
7:05 PM ET	Walls (yellow card) 24'; Forbes 44'; Duba 68'	Report	Rivera (yellow card) 62'	Stadium: Sahlen's Stadium; Attendance: 6,896; Referee: Jaroslav Werel

June 19, 2015 Match 13	Harrisburg City Islanders	1 - 1	Rochester Rhinos	Harrisburg, PA
7:30 PM ET	Plumhoff 44'	Report	Ringhof (yellow card) 56'; Volesky 87'	Stadium: Skyline Sports Complex; Attendance: 3,024; Referee: Mark Treilman

June 27, 2015 Match 14	Rochester Rhinos	1 - 0	Pittsburgh Riverhounds	Rochester, NY
7:05 PM ET	Walls 79'	Report	Hunt (yellow card) 53'; Earls (yellow card) 82'; Arena (yellow card) 90'; Hunt (red card) 90'	Stadium: Sahlen's Stadium; Attendance: 6,704; Referee: Jamie Herrera

July 3, 2015 Match 15	Charleston Battery	0 - 0	Rochester Rhinos	Charleston, SC
7:30 PM ET	van Schaik (yellow card) 57'	Report	Garzi (yellow card) 30'; McMahon (yellow card) 35'; Rudy (yellow card) 84'; Volesky (yellow card) 86'	Stadium: Blackbaud Stadium; Attendance: 3,448; Referee: Aleksander Zhelyazk

July 8, 2015 Match 16	Rochester Rhinos	2 - 1	FC Montreal	Rochester, NY
7:05 PM ET	Rolfe 15'; Rudy (yellow card) 29'; Volesky 32'; Rudy (red card) 64'	Report	Paulmin (yellow card) 14'; Messoudi (yellow card) 56'; Gravelle 85'	Stadium: Sahlen's Stadium; Attendance: 4,251; Referee: Ernie Constantine

July 11, 2015 Match 17	Toronto FC II	0 - 2	Rochester Rhinos	Vaughan, Ontario
2:00 PM ET		Report	Duba 55'; Mendoza 57'; Duba (yellow card) 63'; Volesky (yellow card) 90'	Stadium: Ontario Soccer Centre; Attendance: 565; Referee: Alexis Vaughan

July 18, 2015 Match 18	Rochester Rhinos	0 - 0	Charlotte Independence	Rochester, NY
7:05 PM ET	Garzi (yellow card) 68'	Summary	Martínez (yellow card) 2'; DelPiccolo (yellow card) 34'	Stadium: Sahlen's Stadium; Attendance: 5,189; Referee: (United States) David Mon

July 26, 2015 Match 19	Rochester Rhinos	1 - 0	Charleston Battery	Rochester, NY
4:05 PM ET	Steevan Dos Santos 9'; Van De Casteele (yellow card) 32'	Summary	Garbanzo (yellow card) 24'; Ferguson (yellow card) 90'	Stadium: Sahlen's Stadium; Attendance: 6,922; Referee: (United States) Charles Murphy

August 1, 2015 Match 20	Charlotte Independence	4 - 1	Rochester Rhinos	Charlotte, NC
7:00 PM ET	Mike Garzi (yellow card) 25'; Grant Van De Casteele 32'; Pat McMahon (yellow card) 39'; Tony Walls (yellow card) 56'; Christian Volesky 59'		(yellow card) 27' (goal) 34' Alex Martínez; 38' Tomasz Zahorski; 51' Enzo Martínez; 61' (pen.) (yellow card) 66' Caros Alvarez	Stadium: Ramblewood Soccer Complex; Attendance: 2,145; Referee: Neil Barbulescu

August 9, 2015 Match 21	Rochester Rhinos	1 - 1	Richmond Kickers	Rochester, NY
5:05 PM ET	Kenardo Forbes 50'		(yellow card) 37' (goal) 53' Jared Jeffrey; (yellow card) 42' William Yomby; (yellow card) 50' Travis Worra; (yellow card) 67' Fred Owusu Sekyere	Stadium: Sahlen's Stadium; Attendance: 5,234; Referee: Vito Testa, Jr.

August 15, 2015 Match 22	Rochester Rhinos	2 - 1	Wilmington Hammerheads	Rochester, NY
7:05 PM ET	Mendoza (yellow card) 37'; Forbes 26'; Apostolopoulos (yellow card) 33'; Van de Casteele 81'		Moose 59'; Cole (yellow card) 60'; Ackley (yellow card) 82'; Heaney (yellow card) 89'	Stadium: Sahlen's Stadium; Attendance: 4,842; Referee: Tori Penso

August 22, 2015 Match 23	Rochester Rhinos	4 - 0	Harrisburg City Islanders	Rochester, NY
7:05 PM ET	Walls 16'; Mendoza (yellow card) 19'; Duba 67'; Duba 71'; Samuels 86'		Leverock (yellow card) 48'; Ekra (yellow card) 55'; Noble (yellow card) 60'	Stadium: Sahlen's Stadium; Attendance: 6,272; Referee: David Mon

August 30, 2015 Match 24	Rochester Rhinos	2 - 0	Saint Louis FC	Rochester, NY
4:05 PM ET	Rolfe 4'; Walls 35'		Roberts (yellow card) 30'	Stadium: Sahlen's Stadium; Attendance: 5,532; Referee: Jamie Herrera

September 5, 2015 Match 25	Richmond Kickers	0 - 0	Rochester Rhinos	Richmond, VA
7:00 PM ET	Callahan (yellow card) 36'; Robinson (yellow card) 44'; Martin (yellow card) 78'		McMahon (yellow card) 69'	Stadium: City Stadium; Attendance: 3,411; Referee: Neil Barbulescu

September 16, 2015 Match 26	Pittsburgh Riverhounds	1 - 1	Rochester Rhinos	Pittsburgh, PA
7:00 PM ET	Hunt (yellow card) 51'; Moloto 69'		Volesky 83'	Stadium: Highmark Stadium; Attendance: 2,499; Referee: Guido Gonzalez Jr

September 19, 2015 Match 27	Rochester Rhinos	3 - 2	New York Red Bulls II	Rochester, NY
7:05 PM ET	Rolfe 3'; Rolfe 9'; McMahon (yellow card) 31'; Mulgrew (yellow card) 53'; Garzi (red card) 60'; Mendoza (yellow card) 88'; Mendoza 90'		Obekop 35'; Plewa (yellow card) 38'; Williams (yellow card) 44'; Bonomo 90'	Stadium: Sahlen's Stadium; Attendance: 4,672; Referee: David Mon

September 24, 2015 Match 28	Rochester Rhinos	2 - 0	Toronto FC II	Rochester, NY
7:05 PM ET	Rolfe 69'; Samuels 85'			Stadium: Sahlen's Stadium; Attendance: 5,612; Referee: Jaroslaw Werel

==== Standings (Eastern Conference) ====
Pos	Team	Pld	W	D	L	GF	GA	GD	Pts	Qualification
1	Rochester Rhinos (C, X)	28	17	10	1	40	15	+25	61	Conference semi-finals
2	Louisville City FC	28	14	6	8	55	34	+21	48	Conference semi-finals
3	Charleston Battery	28	12	10	6	43	28	+15	46	First round
4	New York Red Bulls II	28	12	6	10	46	45	+1	42	First round
5	Pittsburgh Riverhounds	28	11	8	9	53	42	+11	41	First round
6	Richmond Kickers	28	10	11	7	41	35	+6	41	First round
7	Charlotte Independence	28	10	10	8	38	35	+3	40	
8	Harrisburg City Islanders	28	11	6	11	49	53	−4	39	
9	Saint Louis FC	28	8	9	11	30	40	−10	33	
10	FC Montreal	28	8	4	16	32	46	−14	28	
11	Toronto FC II	28	6	5	17	26	52	−26	23	
12	Wilmington Hammerheads	28	3	10	15	22	42	−20	19	

Source: 2015 USL schedule
Rules for classification: 1) head-to-head; 2) total wins; 3) total goal differential; 4) total goals scored; 5) disciplinary points; 6) away goals scored; 7) away goal differential; 8) home goals scored; 9) home goal differential; 10) coin toss or drawing of lots
(C) Champions; (X) Regular Season League Champion

==== Results summary ====
Overall								Home						Away					
Pld	W	D	L	GF	GA	GD	Pts	W	D	L	GF	GA	GD	W	D	L	GF	GA	GD
28	17	10	1	39	15	+24	61	12	2	0	24	5	+19	5	8	1	15	10	+5

Last updated: October 6, 2015.
Source: USL

==== Results by matchday ====
Matchday	1	2	3	4	5	6	7	8	9	10	11	12	13	14	15	16	17	18	19	20	21	22	23	24	25	26	27	28
Stadium	A	A	A	A	A	H	A	H	A	A	H	H	A	H	A	H	A	H	H	A	H	H	H	H	A	H	A	H
Result	D	W	W	D	W	W	W	W	D	D	W	W	D	W	D	W	W	D	W	L	D	W	W	W	D	D	W	W

Updated to match(es) played on October 6, 2015. Source: USL
A = Away; H = Home; W = Win; D = Draw; L = Loss

==== USL Playoffs ====
First round
September 26
#4 New York Red Bulls II (a.e.t.)	4
#5 Pittsburgh Riverhounds	2
September 26
#3 Charleston Battery (a.e.t.)	2
#6 Richmond Kickers	1
September 26
#4 Sacramento Republic FC	0
#5 LA Galaxy II	1
September 25
#3 Colorado Springs Switchbacks FC	2
#6 Seattle Sounders FC 2	0

Conference Semifinals
October 3
#1 Rochester Rhinos	2
#4 New York Red Bulls II	0
October 3
#2 Louisville City FC (a.e.t.)	2
#3 Charleston Battery	0
October 3
#1 Orange County Blues FC	0
#5 LA Galaxy II	2
October 4
#2 Oklahoma City Energy FC (p)	2 (4)
#3 Colorado Springs Switchbacks FC	2 (3)

Conference Finals
October 10
#1 Rochester Rhinos	1
#2 Louisville City FC	0
October 11
#5 LA Galaxy II	2
#2 Oklahoma City Energy FC	1

USL Championship
October 16
#1 Rochester Rhinos (a.e.t.)	2
#5 LA Galaxy II	1

==== Playoff Results ====
October 3, 2015 Conference Semi-finals	Rochester Rhinos	2–0	New York Red Bulls II	Rochester, New York
7:05 pm EDT	Dos Santos 48'; Obasi (yellow card) 63'; Dos Santos 69'; Van De Casteele (yellow card) 77'	Report; Report	Plewa (red card) 22'	Stadium: Sahlen's Stadium; Attendance: 6,378; Referee: Greg Dopka

October 10, 2015 Conference finals	Rochester Rhinos	1 - 0	Louisville City FC	Rochester, New York
7:05 pm EDT	Apostolopolous 23'; McMahon (yellow card) 29'; Forbes (yellow card) 49'; Walls (yellow card) 60'; Dixon (yellow card) 74'; Duba (red card) 83'	Report	Quinn (yellow card) 49'	Stadium: Sahlen's Stadium; Attendance: 5,561; Referee: Matthew Kreutzer

October 16, 2015 Championship	Rochester Rhinos	2–1 (a.e.t.)	LA Galaxy II	Rochester, New York
7:30 pm EDT	Bourdeau (yellow card) 58'; Forbes (yellow card) 81'; Samuels 90+'; Samuels 113'		Walker (yellow card) 45'; Lassiter 65'; Maganto (yellow card) 85'	Stadium: Sahlen's Stadium; Attendance: 5,247; Referee: Nima Saghafi

Championship Game MVP: Asani Samuels

=== U.S. Open Cup ===
May 20, 2015 Second round	Rochester Rhinos (New York (state))	1–0	(New York (state)) GBFC Thunder	Rochester, New York
7:05 PM ET	Forbes 39'			Stadium: Sahlen's Stadium

May 27, 2015 Third Round	Harrisburg City Islanders (Pennsylvania)	1 - 3	(New York (state)) Rochester Rhinos	Harrisburg, Pennsylvania
7:00 PM ET	Barril (yellow card) 8'; Cruz (yellow card) 57'; Tribbett (yellow card) 68'; DiPrima (yellow card) 75'; Jankouskas 106'	Report	Duba (yellow card) 15' (yellow-red card) 38'; Ringhof (yellow card) 98'; Forbes 107'; Samuels 115', 120', (yellow card) 119'; Walls (yellow card) 119'	Stadium: Skyline Sports Complex

June 16, 2015 Fourth Round	Philadelphia Union (Pennsylvania)	0–0 (a.e.t.) (3–1 p)	(New York (state)) Rochester Rhinos	Chester, Pennsylvania
7:30 PM ET	Pfeffer (yellow card) 104'	Report; Box Score	Totsch (yellow card) 80'; McMahon (yellow card) 90'; Walls (yellow card) 98'; Volesky (yellow card) 103'	Stadium: PPL Park
	Penalties
	Edu (penalty scored); Nogueira (penalty scored); Sapong (penalty missed); Maidana (penalty scored)		Mendoza (penalty scored); Apostolopoulos (penalty missed); Walls (penalty missed); Volesky (penalty missed)

== Statistics ==
=== Appearances and goals ===
No.	Pos	Nat	Player	Total		Regular Season		Playoffs		U.S. Open Cup	
No.	Pos	Nat	Player	Apps	Goals	Apps	Goals	Apps	Goals	Apps	Goals

=== Top scorers ===
Position	Nation	Number	Name	USL Pro	U.S. Open Cup	Total

=== Disciplinary record ===
Position	Nation	Number	Name	USL Pro		U.S. Open Cup		Playoffs		Total (USSF Total)	
Position	Nation	Number	Name	Yellow card	Red card	Yellow card	Red card	Yellow card	Red card	Yellow card	Red card
TOTALS				41	2	—	—	8	1	—	—

== Roster ==
as of April 28, 2015

No.	Position	Nation	Player
1	GK	USA	Adam Grinwis
2	MF	USA	Marcos Ugarte
3	MF	USA	Alex Dixon
4	DF	USA	Sean Totsch
5	DF	GRE	Vassilios Apostolopoulos
6	MF	USA	Christian Silva
7	DF	ENG	Onua Thomas Obasi
8	FW	USA	Christian Volesky
9	FW	USA	Colin Rolfe
10	FW	CPV	Steevan Humberto Fortes dos Santos
11	MF	USA	Jonny Mendoza
12	FW	JAM	Asani Samuels
13	MF	USA	Mike Garzi
15	DF	USA	Pat McMahon
16	MF	USA	Drew Ruggles
17	MF	USA	Nathan Bourdeau
18	DF	USA	Grant Van De Casteele
20	DF	USA	Tony Walls
21	MF	JAM	Kenardo Forbes
22	DF	GER	Julian Ringhof
27	GK	SCO	Sean Murdoch
29	MF	USA	Tyler Rudy
33	GK	USA	Brandon Miller
92	FW	USA	Timi Mulgrew

=== Technical Staff ===
as of May 30, 2015

Position	Name
Head coach	(United States) Bob Lilley
Assistant coach	(Greece) Georgios Kyriazis
Goalkeeping coach	(Republic of Ireland) Gavin McInerny
Head Trainer	(United States) Doug Graham

== See also ==
- 2015 in American soccer
- 2015 USL season
