= 2015 USL playoffs =

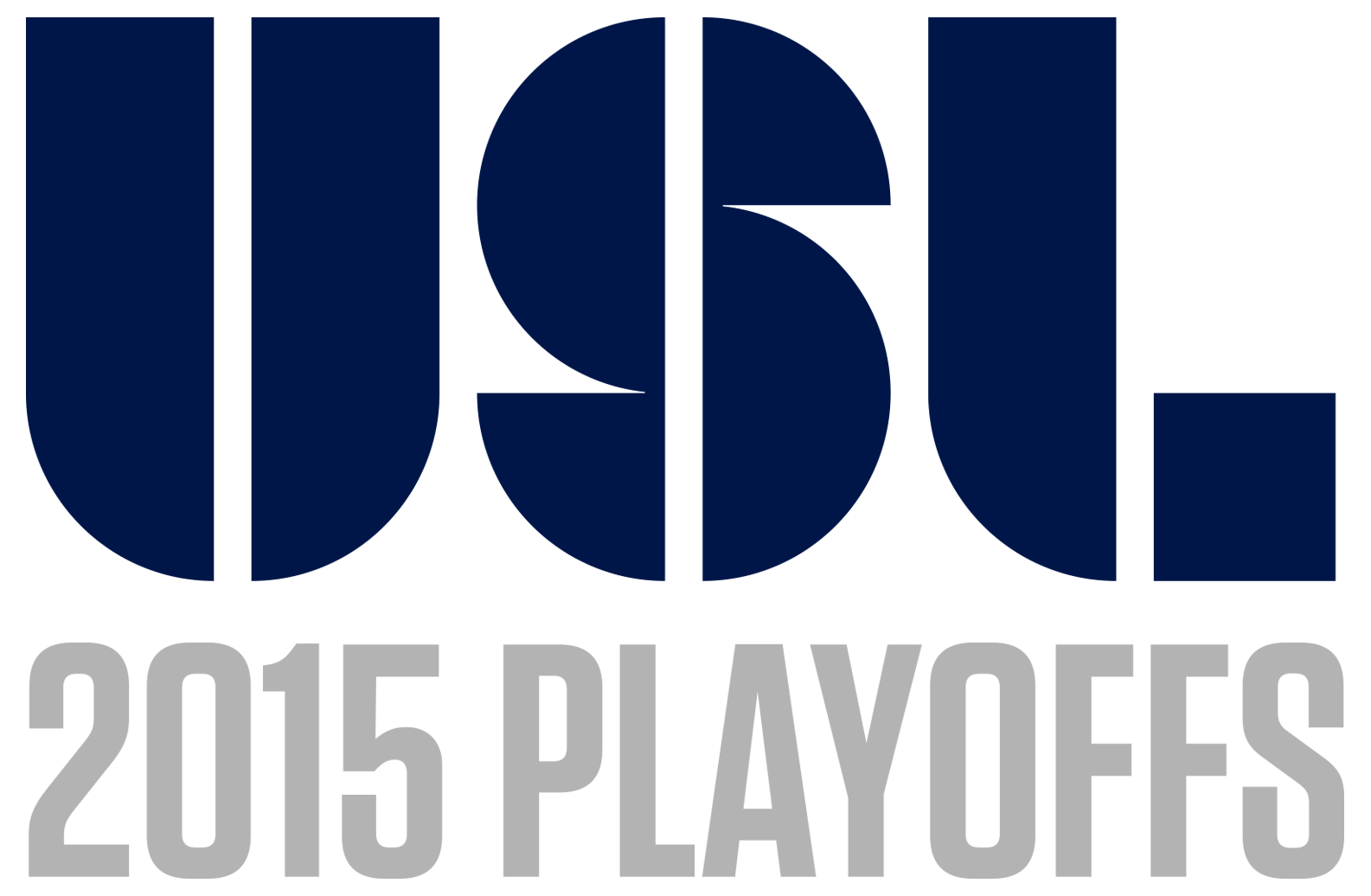

Tournament details
- Country: United States; Canada
- Teams: 12

Final positions
- Champions: Rochester Rhinos
- Runners-up: LA Galaxy II

Tournament statistics
- Matches played: 11
- Goals scored: 29 (2.64 per match)
- Top goal scorer: Ariel Lassiter (4)

The 2015 USL playoffs was a postseason tournament following the 2015 United Soccer League regular season, the first since the league rebranded for the 2015 season. Including USL Pro history, it is the fourth postseason tournament. The tournament began on September 25 and will last until October 16.

Twelve teams (top 6 per conference) will compete, up from 8 the last 3 seasons. Teams will be seeded one through six in each conference, with the two highest seeds earning a bye to the conference semifinals. The third seed will host the sixth seed, while the fourth seed will host the fifth seed in a single-elimination match. The winners will face the second and first seed, respectively, in the conference semifinals.

The conference semifinal winners will play against each other in the Conference Championship, which will serve as the overall semifinals for the playoff. The winners of the Eastern and Western Conference Championship will play for the championship.

The winner of the playoffs will be crowned league champion.

== USL Conference standings ==
The top 6 teams from each conference advance to the USL playoffs.

Eastern Conference

Pos	Team	Pld	Pts
1	Rochester Rhinos (C, X)	28	61
2	Louisville City FC	28	48
3	Charleston Battery	28	46
4	New York Red Bulls II	28	42
5	Pittsburgh Riverhounds	28	41
6	Richmond Kickers	28	41
7	Charlotte Independence	28	40
8	Harrisburg City Islanders	28	39
9	Saint Louis FC	28	33
10	FC Montreal	28	28
11	Toronto FC II	28	23
12	Wilmington Hammerheads	28	19

Source: 2015 USL schedule
(C) Champions; (X) Regular Season League Champion

Western Conference

Pos	Team	Pld	Pts
1	Orange County Blues	28	47
2	Oklahoma City Energy	28	47
3	Colorado Springs Switchbacks	28	46
4	Sacramento Republic	28	46
5	LA Galaxy II	28	45
6	Seattle Sounders 2	28	42
7	Tulsa Roughnecks	28	39
8	Portland Timbers 2	28	35
9	Austin Aztex	28	33
10	Arizona United	28	32
11	Vancouver Whitecaps 2	28	30
12	Real Monarchs	28	29

Source: 2015 USL schedule

== Bracket ==
First round
September 26
#4 New York Red Bulls II (a.e.t.)	4
#5 Pittsburgh Riverhounds	2
September 26
#3 Charleston Battery (a.e.t.)	2
#6 Richmond Kickers	1
September 26
#4 Sacramento Republic FC	0
#5 LA Galaxy II	1
September 25
#3 Colorado Springs Switchbacks FC	2
#6 Seattle Sounders FC 2	0

Conference Semifinals
October 3
#1 Rochester Rhinos	2
#4 New York Red Bulls II	0
October 3
#2 Louisville City FC (a.e.t.)	2
#3 Charleston Battery	0
October 3
#1 Orange County Blues FC	0
#5 LA Galaxy II	2
October 4
#2 Oklahoma City Energy FC (p)	2 (4)
#3 Colorado Springs Switchbacks FC	2 (3)

Conference Finals
October 10
#1 Rochester Rhinos	1
#2 Louisville City FC	0
October 11
#5 LA Galaxy II	2
#2 Oklahoma City Energy FC	1

USL Championship
October 16
#1 Rochester Rhinos (a.e.t.)	2
#5 LA Galaxy II	1

== Schedule ==
=== First round ===
September 25, 2015	Colorado Springs Switchbacks FC	2–0	Seattle Sounders FC 2	Colorado Springs, Colorado
7:00 pm MDT	Gonzalez 14'; Greer 22'; Burt (yellow card) 78'; Gorrick (yellow card) 88'; Phillips (yellow card) 90+'	Report; Report; Report	Fairclough (yellow card) 5'; Lowe (yellow card) 49'	Stadium: Sand Creek Stadium; Attendance: 2,532; Referee: Rosendo Mendoza

September 26, 2015	New York Red Bulls II	4–2 (a.e.t.)	Pittsburgh Riverhounds	Harrison, New Jersey
5:00 pm EDT	Sanchez 62'; Ouimette 102', 115'; Bedoya 119'	Report; Report; Report	Hunt 15', 96'; Moloto (yellow card) 61'; Arena (yellow card) 65'; Newnam (yellow card) 123' (red card) 123'	Stadium: Red Bull Arena; Attendance: 915; Referee: Jaime Herrera

September 26, 2015	Charleston Battery	2–1 (a.e.t.)	Richmond Kickers	Charleston, South Carolina
7:30 pm EDT	Kelly 107'; Boyd (yellow card) 109' (red card) 120'; Lasso 114'	Report; Report; Report	Callahan (yellow card) 27'; Mueller 92' (o.g.)	Stadium: MUSC Health Stadium; Attendance: 3,427; Referee: Matthew Kreitzer

September 26, 2015	Sacramento Republic	0–1	LA Galaxy II	Sacramento, California
10:00 pm EDT	López (yellow card) 42'; Kiffe (yellow card) 70'; Vuković (yellow card) 90+'	Report; Report; Report	Olivera 13' (pen.); Bowen (yellow card) 36'; Covarrubias (yellow card) 40'; Walker (yellow card) 89'	Stadium: Bonney Field; Attendance: 11,442; Referee: Alex Chilowicz

=== Conference semifinals ===
October 3, 2015	Rochester Rhinos	2–0	New York Red Bulls II	Rochester, New York
7:05 pm EDT	Dos Santos 48', 69'; Obasi (yellow card) 63'; Van De Casteele (yellow card) 77'	Report; Report	Plewa (red card) 22'	Stadium: Sahlen's Stadium; Attendance: 6,378; Referee: Greg Dopka

October 3, 2015	Louisville City FC	2–0 (a.e.t.)	Charleston Battery	Louisville, Kentucky
7:30 pm EDT	Burke (yellow card) 42'; Fondy 107', 117'	Report; Report	Kelly (yellow card) 48'	Stadium: Louisville Slugger Field; Attendance: 8,517; Referee: Luis Guardia

October 3, 2015	Orange County Blues	0–2	LA Galaxy II	Carson, California
7:00 pm PDT	Navarro (yellow card) 18'; Petričević (yellow card) 90+'	Report; Report	Lassiter 14', 54'; McBean (yellow card) 47'; Walker (yellow card) 79'; Covarrubias (yellow card) 89'	Stadium: StubHub Center; Attendance: 2,047; Referee: Chipalo Street

October 4, 2015	Oklahoma City Energy FC	2–2 (a.e.t.) (4–3 p)	Colorado Springs Switchbacks FC	Oklahoma City, Oklahoma
6:00 pm CDT	Sanchez 45+'; Thomas (yellow card) 90'; Doue 98' (yellow card) 99'	Report; Report	Vercollone 6'; Burt (yellow card) 14'; Argueta (yellow card) 39'; Armstrong (yellow card) 90+'; King 105'; Gonzalez (yellow card) 105+'	Stadium: Taft Stadium; Attendance: 6,370; Referee: Rubiel Vazquez
	Penalties
	König (penalty scored); Evans (penalty scored); Thomas (penalty scored); Ryden (penalty scored)		(penalty scored) Vercollone; (penalty missed) Maybin; (penalty scored) Robinson; (penalty scored) Hoffman; (penalty missed) Gonzalez

=== Conference finals ===
October 10, 2015	Rochester Rhinos	1–0	Louisville City FC	Rochester, New York
7:05 pm EDT	Apostolopoulos 21'; McMahon (yellow card) 29'; Forbes (yellow card) 49'; Walls (yellow card) 60'; Dixon (yellow card) 74'; Dos Santos (red card) 83'	Report; Report; Report	Quinn (yellow card) 49'	Stadium: Sahlen's Stadium; Attendance: 5,561; Referee: Matthew Kreitzer

October 11, 2015	Oklahoma City Energy FC	1–2	LA Galaxy II	Oklahoma City, Oklahoma
6:00 pm CDT	Evans (yellow card) 31'; Andrews 66'	Report; Report; Report	Lassiter 7'; Auras 23'; Maganto (yellow card) 89'	Stadium: Taft Stadium; Attendance: 7,654; Referee: Jaime Herrera

=== USL championship ===
October 16, 2015	Rochester Rhinos	2–1 (a.e.t.)	LA Galaxy II	Rochester, New York
7:30 pm EDT	Bourdeau (yellow card) 58'; Forbes (yellow card) 82'; Samuels 90+1', 113'	Report; Report; Report	Walker (yellow card) 45'; Lassiter 65'; Maganto (yellow card) 86'	Stadium: Sahlen's Stadium; Attendance: 5,247; Referee: Nima Saghafi

Championship Game MVP: Asani Samuels (ROC)

== Top goalscorers ==
Rank	Player	Club	Goals
1	(Costa Rica) Ariel Lassiter	LA Galaxy II	4
2	(Cape Verde) Steevan Dos Santos	Rochester Rhinos	2
2	(United States) Matthew Fondy	Louisville City FC	2
2	(United States) Willie Hunt	Pittsburgh Riverhounds	2
2	(Canada) Karl Ouimette	New York Red Bulls II	2
2	(Jamaica) Asani Samuels	Rochester Rhinos	2
7	(United States) Coady Andrews	Oklahoma City Energy	1
7	(Greece) Vassilios Apostolopoulos	Rochester Rhinos	1
7	(France) André Auras	LA Galaxy II	1
7	(United States) Dan Bedoya	New York Red Bulls II	1
7	(United States) Peabo Doue	Oklahoma City Energy	1
7	(Mexico) Miguel Gonzalez	Colorado Springs Switchbacks	1
7	(United States) J. J. Greer	Colorado Springs Switchbacks	1
7	(Jamaica) Dane Kelly	Charleston Battery	1
7	(United States) Aaron King	Colorado Springs Switchbacks	1
7	(United States) Forrest Lasso	Charleston Battery	1
7	(Uruguay) Bryan Olivera	LA Galaxy II	1
7	(Mexico) Chuy Sanchez	Oklahoma City Energy	1
7	(United States) Manolo Sanchez	New York Red Bulls II	1
7	(United States) Luke Vercollone	Colorado Springs Switchbacks	1
