= 2015 USL season =

29th season of third-division soccer league in the United States

United Soccer League
- Season: 2015
- Champions: Rochester Rhinos (1st Title)
- Regular Season Title: Rochester Rhinos (1st Title)
- Matches: 336
- Goals: 958 (2.85 per match)
- Best player: (United States) Matt Fondy Louisville City FC
- Top goalscorer: (United States) Matt Fondy Louisville City FC (22 Goals)
- Best goalkeeper: (United States) Brandon Miller Rochester Rhinos
- Biggest home win: CSS 5–0 AZU (May 23); CSS 5–0 OCB (Jun 24)
- Biggest away win: MON 0–5 HAR (Sep 16)
- Highest scoring: PIT 6–5 HAR (May 30) (USL Record)
- Longest winning run: 6 games Colorado Springs Switchbacks (Jun 6 – Jul 3); Louisville City FC (Jun 27 – Aug 1)
- Longest unbeaten run: 19 games Rochester Rhinos (Mar 28 – Jul 26)
- Longest losing run: 5 games FC Montreal (Mar 28 – May 2); Arizona United (Jul 12 – Aug 2)
- Highest attendance: 13,979; RMO 2-1 SEA (Aug 28)
- Lowest attendance: 50; TOR 1–0 WIL (Jun 27)
- Total attendance: 1,121,962 (333 of 336 games reported)
- Average attendance: 3,369
- All statistics correct as of September 24, 2015.

The 2015 USL season was the fifth season of the United Soccer League (USL) and the first under its new name (previously the league was called USL Pro). This season represented a substantial expansion from 14 teams in 2014 to 24 teams in 2015, and the division of the league into two conferences. It is also the 29th season of third-division soccer in the United States.

Seven Major League Soccer clubs created reserve franchises in the USL for the 2015 season, following the lead of the LA Galaxy, who had done so in 2014: FC Montreal, New York Red Bulls II, Portland Timbers 2, Real Monarchs, Seattle Sounders FC 2, Toronto FC II, and Vancouver Whitecaps FC 2.

In 2015, the Austin Aztex, Colorado Springs Switchbacks, Saint Louis FC and Tulsa Roughnecks joined the league as expansion sides. The Charlotte Eagles and Dayton Dutch Lions, both original founding members of the USL, removed themselves to the Premier Development League. The Eagles transferred their USL rights to the new Charlotte Independence club. After joining MLS, Orlando City SC sold their USL franchise rights to Louisville City.

== Teams, stadiums, and affiliations ==
Team	Location	Stadium	Capacity	Manager	Captain	Kit Sponsor	MLS Affiliate
Arizona United SC	Scottsdale, Arizona	Scottsdale Stadium	12,880	(United States) Michael Dellorusso	(United States) Carl Woszczynski	Dignity Health AZ	FC Dallas
Austin Aztex	Austin, Texas	House Park	6,000	(Scotland) Paul Dalglish	(United States) Kyle Hoffer	None	
Charleston Battery	Charleston, South Carolina	MUSC Health Stadium	5,100	(United States) Michael Anhaeuser	(United States) Jarad vanSchaik	SPARC/Teamphoria!	Houston Dynamo
Charlotte Independence	Charlotte, North Carolina	Ramblewood Soccer Complex	4,300	(United States) Mike Jeffries	(Colombia) Jorge Herrera	OrthoCarolina	Colorado Rapids
Colorado Springs Switchbacks	Colorado Springs, Colorado	Sand Creek Stadium	3,500	(United States) Steve Trittschuh	(United States) Luke Vercollone	Penrose-St. Francis Health Services	
Harrisburg City Islanders	Harrisburg, Pennsylvania	Skyline Sports Complex	5,000	(United States) Bill Becher	(United States) Jason Pelletier (United States) Nick Noble	Capital Blue Cross	Philadelphia Union
LA Galaxy II	Carson, California	StubHub Center Track and Field Stadium	2,000	(United States) Curt Onalfo	(United States) Daniel Steres	Herbalife	LA Galaxy
Louisville City FC	Louisville, Kentucky	Louisville Slugger Field	13,131	(Republic of Ireland) James O'Connor	(United States) Matt Fondy	Humana	Orlando City SC
FC Montreal	Montreal	Saputo Stadium training field	1,000	(France) Philippe Eullaffroy	(Canada) Nazim Belguendouz	Bank of Montreal	Montreal Impact
New York Red Bulls II	Harrison, New Jersey	Red Bull Arena	20,000	(United States) John Wolyniec	(Canada) Karl Ouimette	Red Bull	New York Red Bulls
Oklahoma City Energy FC	Oklahoma City, Oklahoma	Taft Stadium	7,500	(Denmark) Jimmy Nielsen	(United States) Michael Thomas	First Fidelity Bank	Sporting Kansas City
Orange County Blues FC	Irvine, California	Anteater Stadium	2,500	(Switzerland) Oliver Wyss	(Switzerland) Didier Crettenand	Sports 1 Marketing	
Pittsburgh Riverhounds	Pittsburgh, Pennsylvania	Highmark Stadium	3,500	(United States) Mark Steffens	(Republic of Ireland) Danny Earls	Allegheny Health Network	
Portland Timbers 2	Portland, Oregon	Merlo Field	4,892	(United States) Jay Vidovich	(United States) Blair Gavin	Stand Together (Portland Timbers/Thorns Community Outreach)	Portland Timbers
Real Monarchs	Sandy, Utah	Rio Tinto Stadium	20,213	(United States) Freddy Juarez	(Brazil) Lucas Baldin	LifeVantage	Real Salt Lake
Richmond Kickers	Richmond, Virginia	City Stadium	22,000	(England) Leigh Cowlishaw		Woodfin Home Comfort Systems	D.C. United
Rochester Rhinos	Rochester, New York	Sahlen's Stadium	13,768	(United States) Bob Lilley	(United States) Tony Walls	Bimbo Bakeries USA	New England Revolution
Saint Louis FC	Fenton, Missouri	Soccer Park	5,500	(United States) Dale Schilly	(New Zealand) James Musa	Electrical Connection, NECA/IBEW Local 1	Chicago Fire
Sacramento Republic FC	Sacramento, California	Bonney Field	11,442	(England) Paul Buckle	(United States) Justin Braun	UC Davis Children's Hospital	San Jose Earthquakes
Seattle Sounders FC 2	Tukwila, Washington	Starfire Sports Complex	4,500	(Saint Vincent and the Grenadines) Ezra Hendrickson	(The Gambia) Amadou Sanyang	Xbox	Seattle Sounders FC
Toronto FC II	Vaughan, Ontario	Ontario Soccer Centre	3,500	(Canada) Jason Bent	(Canada) Chris Mannella	Bank of Montreal	Toronto FC
Tulsa Roughnecks	Tulsa, Oklahoma	ONEOK Field	7,833	(England) David Irving	(United States) Zac Lubin	Modelo Especial	
Vancouver Whitecaps FC 2	Vancouver, British Columbia	Thunderbird Stadium	3,500	(South Africa) Alan Koch	(Canada) Tyler Rosenlund	Bell Canada	Vancouver Whitecaps FC
Wilmington Hammerheads	Wilmington, North Carolina	Legion Stadium	6,000	(United States) Carson Porter	(United States) Brian Ackley	New Hanover Regional Medical Center	New York City FC

Affiliate
Partnership

There are eight USL teams owned and operated by MLS clubs and 11 USL-MLS affiliations among the 24 USL clubs.

=== Player transfers ===
For full article, see List of USL transfers 2015.

== Competition format ==
Due to expansion, the league was divided into two conferences, Eastern and Western. Each team plays the clubs within their conferences in a home and away series plus six additional games with geographic rivals regardless of conference for a 28-game schedule. The top six finishers in each conference qualify for the four-week playoffs.

Locations of announced teams for the 2015 United Soccer League season
Eastern Conference; Western Conference

== League table ==
Eastern Conference

Pos	Team	Pld	W	D	L	GF	GA	GD	Pts	Qualification
1	Rochester Rhinos (C, X)	28	17	10	1	40	15	+25	61	Conference semi-finals
2	Louisville City FC	28	14	6	8	55	34	+21	48	Conference semi-finals
3	Charleston Battery	28	12	10	6	43	28	+15	46	First round
4	New York Red Bulls II	28	12	6	10	46	45	+1	42	First round
5	Pittsburgh Riverhounds	28	11	8	9	53	42	+11	41	First round
6	Richmond Kickers	28	10	11	7	41	35	+6	41	First round
7	Charlotte Independence	28	10	10	8	38	35	+3	40	
8	Harrisburg City Islanders	28	11	6	11	49	53	−4	39	
9	Saint Louis FC	28	8	9	11	30	40	−10	33	
10	FC Montreal	28	8	4	16	32	46	−14	28	
11	Toronto FC II	28	6	5	17	26	52	−26	23	
12	Wilmington Hammerheads	28	3	10	15	22	42	−20	19	

Source: 2015 USL schedule
Rules for classification: 1) head-to-head; 2) total wins; 3) total goal differential; 4) total goals scored; 5) disciplinary points; 6) away goals scored; 7) away goal differential; 8) home goals scored; 9) home goal differential; 10) coin toss or drawing of lots
(C) Champions; (X) Regular Season League Champion

Western Conference

Pos	Team	Pld	W	D	L	GF	GA	GD	Pts	Qualification
1	Orange County Blues	28	14	5	9	38	34	+4	47	Conference semi-finals
2	Oklahoma City Energy	28	13	8	7	44	36	+8	47	Conference semi-finals
3	Colorado Springs Switchbacks	28	14	4	10	53	35	+18	46	First round
4	Sacramento Republic	28	13	7	8	43	31	+12	46	First round
5	LA Galaxy II	28	14	3	11	39	31	+8	45	First round
6	Seattle Sounders 2	28	13	3	12	45	42	+3	42	First round
7	Tulsa Roughnecks	28	11	6	11	49	46	+3	39	
8	Portland Timbers 2	28	11	2	15	38	45	−7	35	
9	Austin Aztex	28	10	3	15	32	41	−9	33	
10	Arizona United	28	10	2	16	31	55	−24	32	
11	Vancouver Whitecaps 2	28	8	6	14	39	53	−14	30	
12	Real Monarchs	28	7	8	13	32	42	−10	29	

Source: 2015 USL schedule
Rules for classification: 1) head-to-head; 2) total wins; 3) total goal differential; 4) total goals scored; 5) disciplinary points; 6) away goals scored; 7) away goal differential; 8) home goals scored; 9) home goal differential; 10) coin toss or drawing of lots

== Results table ==
Color Key: Home • Away • Win • Loss • Draw
Club	Match																											
Club	1	2	3	4	5	6	7	8	9	10	11	12	13	14	15	16	17	18	19	20	21	22	23	24	25	26	27	28
Arizona United SC (AZU)	OCB	LAG	AUS	OCB	POR	CSS	TUL	AUS	CSS	VAN	SAC	SEA	RMO	POR	OCB	SEA	AUS	AUS	OKC	TUL	LAG	OCB	VAN	LAG	RMO	RMO	OKC	SAC
Arizona United SC (AZU)	2–1	2–1	1–0	0–3	0–2	2–3	1–1	3–2	0–5	0–2	1–2	2–1	2–1	1–3	2–0	0–4	1–4	0–1	0–3	3–6	2–1	0–3	2–0	2–1	2–3	0–1	0–1	0–0
Austin Aztex (AUS)	CSS	VAN	TUL	AZU	LAG	CSS	OKC	RMO	AZU	TUL	OKC	SAC	POR	TUL	SAC	CSS	RMO	AZU	AZU	POR	OCB	LAG	OCB	OKC	SEA	CSS	SEA	VAN
Austin Aztex (AUS)	2–0	0–3	2–0	0–1	1–2	1–0	2–2	3–2	2–3	0–1	0–1	1–0	1–3	1–1	0–0	0–2	1–3	4–1	1–0	0–1	0–1	2–3	1–0	0–2	2–1	0–3	2–3	3–2
Charleston Battery (CHB)	TOR	CLT	HAR	NYR	WIL	RIC	PIT	MON	NYR	CLT	WIL	WIL	RIC	CLT	HAR	ROC	HAR	WIL	TOR	ROC	MON	STL	STL	LOU	RIC	PIT	LOU	CLT
Charleston Battery (CHB)	3–2	3–2	2–0	1–1	2–1	2–2	3–1	0–1	1–1	1–1	1–0	1–1	1–1	1–2	4–1	0–0	4–0	1–0	0–1	0–1	0–0	1–1	2–3	1–3	2–0	1–1	2–0	3–1
Charlotte Independence (CLT)	CHB	WIL	RIC	HAR	LOU	RIC	HAR	CHB	RIC	PIT	CHB	RIC	STL	LOU	ROC	MON	ROC	NYR	NYR	PIT	PIT	MON	TOR	WIL	WIL	TOR	STL	CHB
Charlotte Independence (CLT)	2–3	1–1	0–3	1–1	1–0	3–0	0–2	1–1	1–2	2–1	2–1	0–0	1–2	0–1	0–0	2–0	4–2	2–2	1–1	1–1	2–1	1–0	2–2	1–0	2–2	4–1	0–2	1–3
Colorado Springs Switchbacks (CSS)	AUS	OKC	RMO	RMO	AUS	AZU	OCB	AZU	LAG	VAN	POR	RMO	STL	OCB	AUS	TUL	VAN	SEA	LAG	TUL	SAC	SAC	SEA	RMO	POR	AUS	OKC	LAG
Colorado Springs Switchbacks (CSS)	0–2	1–2	1–0	5–2	0–1	3–2	1–3	5–0	1–2	3–0	3–1	2–1	1–0	5–0	2–0	1–3	2–2	1–1	2–0	0–1	1–0	3–3	2–3	1–2	1–0	3–0	3–3	0–1
Harrisburg City Islanders (HAR)	PIT	CHB	MON	CLT	WIL	NYR	CLT	PIT	TOR	STL	ROC	CHB	WIL	CHB	NYR	NYR	PIT	RIC	RIC	LOU	TOR	ROC	MON	LOU	STL	RIC	MON	PIT
Harrisburg City Islanders (HAR)	2–5	0–2	2–1	1–1	4–0	2–1	2–0	5–6	0–0	1–1	1–1	1–4	1–0	0–4	2–0	0–2	4–3	2–4	3–2	1–5	2–0	0–4	6–0	0–4	0–0	1–1	5–0	1–2
LA Galaxy II (LAG)	RMO	SAC	AZU	SAC	AUS	RMO	VAN	TUL	SAC	CSS	OCB	SEA	VAN	OCB	TUL	OKC	SAC	OCB	POR	CSS	OKC	AZU	AUS	SEA	AZU	OCB	POR	CSS
LA Galaxy II (LAG)	0–0	2–3	1–2	1–3	2–1	1–0	2–1	2–0	0–1	2–1	2–1	0–1	2–0	3–0	4–2	1–1	4–0	1–1	1–0	0–2	0–2	1–2	3–2	1–0	1–2	1–2	0–1	1–0
Louisville City FC (LOU)	STL	RIC	ROC	PIT	TUL	CLT	WIL	TOR	STL	STL	MON	ROC	NYR	OKC	RIC	CLT	PIT	WIL	TOR	MON	HAR	TUL	CHB	PIT	HAR	NYR	CHB	STL
Louisville City FC (LOU)	2–0	1–1	1–1	1–1	2–0	0–1	3–0	4–0	3–3	1–1	2–0	0–2	0–2	6–2	3–0	1–0	2–1	3–1	3–2	0–4	5–1	2–2	3–1	0–1	4–0	2–3	0–2	1–2
FC Montreal (MON)	TOR	ROC	HAR	RIC	ROC	CHB	NYR	ROC	NYR	LOU	RIC	PIT	WIL	ROC	PIT	STL	TOR	CLT	CHB	LOU	STL	TOR	WIL	CLT	HAR	TOR	NYR	HAR
FC Montreal (MON)	0–2	0–3	1–2	0–1	1–2	1–0	2–3	0–1	2–2	0–2	0–0	0–1	1–2	1–2	4–2	5–2	1–0	0–2	0–0	4–0	3–1	2–1	0–0	0–1	0–6	2–3	2–0	0–5
New York Red Bulls II (NYR)	ROC	TOR	WIL	CHB	RIC	ROC	PIT	HAR	CHB	MON	RIC	MON	WIL	LOU	STL	PIT	HAR	HAR	RIC	STL	CLT	WIL	CLT	TOR	WIL	LOU	MON	ROC
New York Red Bulls II (NYR)	0–0	4–1	0–3	1–1	0–1	0–2	3–2	1–2	1–1	3–2	2–4	2–2	1–0	2–0	4–1	0–3	0–2	2–0	4–3	2–1	2–2	2–4	1–1	2–0	2–0	3–2	0–2	2–3
Oklahoma City Energy FC (OKC)	TUL	CSS	SEA	STL	AUS	SEA	VAN	SAC	AUS	POR	VAN	TUL	SAC	LOU	OCB	LAG	OCB	TUL	STL	AZU	LAG	POR	RMO	AUS	RMO	TUL	CSS	AZU
Oklahoma City Energy FC (OKC)	1–1	2–1	2–1	1–2	2–2	1–3	2–2	2–1	1–0	2–0	2–0	2–0	1–2	2–6	0–1	1–1	2–2	1–1	0–0	3–0	2–0	4–3	1–0	2–0	0–2	1–2	3–3	1–0
Orange County Blues FC (OCB)	AZU	VAN	AZU	SAC	SEA	POR	CSS	TUL	SEA	LAG	LAG	CSS	VAN	OKC	AZU	TUL	OKC	LAG	RMO	RMO	AUS	AZU	AUS	POR	LAG	SEA	VAN	SAC
Orange County Blues FC (OCB)	1–2	2–0	3–0	2–1	1–2	2–0	3–1	0–1	1–1	1–2	0–3	0–5	3–2	1–0	0–2	1–4	2–2	1–1	1–0	2–1	1–0	3–0	0–1	3–1	2–1	1–0	1–1	0–0
Pittsburgh Riverhounds (PIT)	HAR	ROC	STL	LOU	TOR	NYR	CHB	RIC	RIC	HAR	STL	CLT	MON	ROC	NYR	TOR	MON	LOU	HAR	WIL	TOR	CLT	CLT	LOU	CHB	WIL	ROC	HAR
Pittsburgh Riverhounds (PIT)	5–2	1–2	1–1	1–1	5–1	2–3	1–3	1–1	2–1	6–5	1–1	1–2	1–0	0–1	3–0	2–0	2–4	1–2	3–4	3–0	3–1	1–1	1–2	1–0	1–1	1–1	1–1	2–1
Portland Timbers 2 (POR)	RMO	SAC	RMO	SEA	SAC	AZU	OCB	RMO	SEA	TUL	OKC	CSS	AUS	VAN	SEA	AZU	VAN	VAN	SEA	LAG	AUS	OKC	VAN	TUL	OCB	CSS	SAC	LAG
Portland Timbers 2 (POR)	3–1	2–1	1–1	1–2	0–3	2–0	0–2	1–1	0–2	3–1	0–2	1–3	3–1	2–3	0–2	3–1	1–2	4–2	0–2	0–1	1–0	3–4	3–1	2–0	1–3	0–1	0–3	1–0
Real Monarchs (RMO)	LAG	POR	POR	CSS	CSS	LAG	SAC	AUS	POR	VAN	SAC	VAN	CSS	SEA	AZU	SAC	AUS	OCB	OCB	TUL	TUL	OKC	SAC	CSS	SEA	OKC	AZU	AZU
Real Monarchs (RMO)	0–0	1–3	1–1	0–1	2–5	0–1	1–0	2–3	1–1	1–2	1–1	2–2	1–2	0–1	1–2	1–1	3–1	0–1	1–2	1–1	1–5	0–1	1–1	2–1	2–1	2–0	3–2	1–0
Richmond Kickers (RIC)	WIL	LOU	WIL	CLT	NYR	MON	CHB	CLT	PIT	PIT	NYR	CLT	CHB	MON	WIL	CLT	LOU	STL	NYR	HAR	HAR	ROC	TOR	STL	CHB	ROC	HAR	TOR
Richmond Kickers (RIC)	2–2	1–1	3–0	3–0	1–0	1–0	2–2	0–3	1–1	1–2	4–2	2–1	1–1	0–0	0–0	0–0	0–3	3–1	3–4	4–2	2–3	1–1	1–2	2–0	0–2	0–0	1–1	2–1
Rochester Rhinos (ROC)	NYR	PIT	MON	LOU	STL	NYR	MON	TOR	WIL	TOR	MON	LOU	HAR	PIT	CHB	MON	TOR	CLT	CHB	CLT	RIC	WIL	HAR	STL	RIC	PIT	NYR	TOR
Rochester Rhinos (ROC)	0–0	2–1	3–0	1–1	1–0	2–0	2–1	1–0	1–1	0–0	1–0	2–0	1–1	1–0	0–0	2–1	2–0	0–0	1–0	2–4	1–1	2–1	4–0	2–0	0–0	1–1	3–2	2–0
Sacramento Republic FC (SAC)	SEA	LAG	POR	LAG	VAN	POR	OCB	RMO	SEA	LAG	OKC	RMO	AUS	AZU	OKC	TUL	AUS	RMO	LAG	SEA	CSS	CSS	RMO	TUL	VAN	POR	AZU	OCB
Sacramento Republic FC (SAC)	2–4	3–2	1–2	3–1	2–0	3–0	1–2	0–1	3–0	1–0	1–2	1–1	0–1	2–1	2–1	3–1	0–0	1–1	0–4	2–0	0–1	3–3	1–1	3–1	2–1	3–1	0–0	0–0
Saint Louis FC (STL)	LOU	TUL	PIT	ROC	OKC	WIL	TOR	LOU	LOU	PIT	HAR	CSS	NYR	WIL	CLT	RIC	MON	TOR	OKC	NYR	MON	CHB	CHB	RIC	ROC	HAR	CLT	LOU
Saint Louis FC (STL)	0–2	2–0	1–1	0–1	2–1	1–0	1–2	3–3	1–1	1–1	1–1	0–1	1–4	0–0	2–1	1–3	2–5	1–0	0–0	1–2	1–3	1–1	3–2	0–2	0–2	0–0	2–0	2–1
Seattle Sounders 2 (SEA)	SAC	VAN	POR	TUL	OKC	VAN	OCB	SAC	OKC	POR	OCB	TUL	LAG	AZU	RMO	POR	VAN	AZU	CSS	POR	SAC	VAN	CSS	LAG	RMO	AUS	OCB	AUS
Seattle Sounders 2 (SEA)	4–2	4–0	2–1	3–4	1–3	1–1	2–1	0–3	3–1	2–0	1–1	1–5	1–0	1–2	1–0	2–0	1–3	4–0	1–1	2–0	0–2	0–3	3–2	0–1	1–2	1–2	0–1	3–2
Toronto FC II (TOR)	CHB	MON	NYR	VAN	PIT	ROC	STL	LOU	ROC	HAR	WIL	PIT	ROC	STL	MON	CHB	LOU	PIT	MON	RIC	HAR	NYR	CLT	MON	CLT	RIC	WIL	ROC
Toronto FC II (TOR)	2–3	2–0	1–4	1–1	1–5	0–1	2–1	0–4	0–0	0–0	1–0	0–2	0–2	0–1	0–1	1–0	2–3	1–3	1–2	2–1	0–2	0–2	2–2	3–2	1–4	1–2	2–2	0–2
Tulsa Roughnecks FC (TUL)	OKC	STL	AUS	SEA	LOU	AZU	LAG	OCB	AUS	POR	SEA	OKC	AUS	SAC	LAG	OCB	CSS	OKC	VAN	VAN	AZU	CSS	RMO	RMO	LOU	POR	SAC	OKC
Tulsa Roughnecks FC (TUL)	1–1	0–2	0–2	4–3	0–2	1–1	0–2	1–0	1–0	1–3	5–1	0–2	1–1	1–3	2–4	4–1	3–1	1–1	4–0	1–3	6–3	1–0	1–1	5–1	2–2	0–2	1–3	2–1
Vancouver Whitecaps FC 2 (VAN)	SEA	AUS	OCB	SAC	TOR	SEA	LAG	OKC	RMO	AZU	RMO	CSS	OKC	LAG	POR	OCB	SEA	POR	CSS	POR	TUL	TUL	SEA	POR	AZU	SAC	OCB	AUS
Vancouver Whitecaps FC 2 (VAN)	0–4	3–0	0–2	0–2	1–1	1–1	1–2	2–2	2–1	2–0	2–2	0–3	0–2	0–2	3–2	2–3	3–1	2–1	2–2	2–4	0–4	3–1	3–0	1–3	0–2	1–2	1–1	2–3
Wilmington Hammerheads (WIL)	RIC	CLT	RIC	NYR	CHB	HAR	STL	LOU	ROC	CHB	CHB	NYR	RIC	MON	TOR	STL	HAR	CHB	LOU	PIT	NYR	ROC	MON	NYR	CLT	CLT	PIT	TOR
Wilmington Hammerheads (WIL)	2–2	1–1	0–3	3–0	1–2	0–4	0–1	0–3	1–1	0–1	1–1	0–1	0–0	2–1	0–1	0–0	0–1	0–1	1–3	0–3	4–2	1–2	0–0	0–2	0–1	2–2	1–1	2–2

USL published schedule and results.

== Playoffs ==
Teams will be seeded No. 1 through No. 6 in each conference, with the top two seeds receiving first-round byes and the No. 3 seed hosting the No. 6 seed and the No. 4 seed hosting the No. 5 seed.

The winner of the No. 3 vs. No. 6 game will then travel to face the No. 2 seed, and the winner of the No. 4 vs. No. 5 game will travel to face the No. 1 seed. The winners will meet in the Eastern and Western Conference Championship games with the remaining two teams advancing to square off in the 2015 USL Championship, hosted by the higher seeded club.

First round
September 26
#4 New York Red Bulls II (a.e.t.)	4
#5 Pittsburgh Riverhounds	2
September 26
#3 Charleston Battery (a.e.t.)	2
#6 Richmond Kickers	1
September 26
#4 Sacramento Republic FC	0
#5 LA Galaxy II	1
September 25
#3 Colorado Springs Switchbacks FC	2
#6 Seattle Sounders FC 2	0

Conference Semifinals
October 3
#1 Rochester Rhinos	2
#4 New York Red Bulls II	0
October 3
#2 Louisville City FC (a.e.t.)	2
#3 Charleston Battery	0
October 3
#1 Orange County Blues FC	0
#5 LA Galaxy II	2
October 4
#2 Oklahoma City Energy FC (p)	2 (4)
#3 Colorado Springs Switchbacks FC	2 (3)

Conference Finals
October 10
#1 Rochester Rhinos	1
#2 Louisville City FC	0
October 11
#5 LA Galaxy II	2
#2 Oklahoma City Energy FC	1

USL Championship
October 16
#1 Rochester Rhinos (a.e.t.)	2
#5 LA Galaxy II	1

=== Eastern Conference ===
September 26, 2015 1st	New York Red Bulls II	4–2 (a.e.t.)	Pittsburgh Riverhounds	Harrison, New Jersey
5:00 pm EDT	Sanchez 62'; Ouimette 102', 115'; Bedoya 119'	Report; Report; Report	Hunt 15', 96'; Moloto (yellow card) 61'; Arena (yellow card) 65'; Newnam (yellow card) 123' (yellow-red card) 123'	Stadium: Red Bull Arena; Attendance: 915; Referee: Jaime Herrera

September 26, 2015 1st	Charleston Battery	2–1 (a.e.t.)	Richmond Kickers	Charleston, South Carolina
7:30 pm EDT	Kelly 107'; Boyd (yellow card) 109' (red card) 120'; Lasso 114'	Report; Report; Report	Callahan (yellow card) 27'; Mueller 92' (o.g.)	Stadium: MUSC Health Stadium; Attendance: 3,427; Referee: Matthew Kreitzer

October 3, 2015 SF	Rochester Rhinos	2–0	New York Red Bulls II	Rochester, New York
7:05 pm EDT	Dos Santos 48', 69'; Obasi (yellow card) 63'; Van De Casteele (yellow card) 77'	Report; Report	Plewa (red card) 22'	Stadium: Sahlen's Stadium; Attendance: 6,378; Referee: Greg Dopka

October 3, 2015 SF	Louisville City FC	2–0 (a.e.t.)	Charleston Battery	Louisville, Kentucky
7:30 pm EDT	Burke (yellow card) 42'; Fondy 107', 117'	Report; Report	Kelly (yellow card) 48'	Stadium: Louisville Slugger Field; Attendance: 8,517; Referee: Luis Guardia

October 10, 2015 F	Rochester Rhinos	1–0	Louisville City FC	Rochester, New York
7:05 pm EDT	Apostolopoulos 21'; McMahon (yellow card) 29'; Forbes (yellow card) 49'; Walls (yellow card) 60'; Dixon (yellow card) 74'; Dos Santos (red card) 83'	Report; Report; Report	Quinn (yellow card) 49'	Stadium: Sahlen's Stadium; Attendance: 5,561; Referee: Matthew Kreitzer

=== Western Conference ===
September 25, 2015 1st	Colorado Springs Switchbacks FC	2–0	Seattle Sounders FC 2	Colorado Springs, Colorado
7:00 pm MDT	González 14'; Greer 22'; Burt (yellow card) 78'; Gorrick (yellow card) 88'; Phillips (yellow card) 90+'	Report; Report; Report	Fairclough (yellow card) 5'; Lowe (yellow card) 49'	Stadium: Sand Creek Stadium; Attendance: 2,532; Referee: Rosendo Mendoza

September 26, 2015 1st	Sacramento Republic	0–1	LA Galaxy II	Sacramento, California
7:30 pm PDT	López (yellow card) 42'; Kiffe (yellow card) 70'; Vuković (yellow card) 90+'	Report; Report; Report	Olivera 13' (pen.); Bowen (yellow card) 36'; Covarrubias (yellow card) 40'; Walker (yellow card) 89'	Stadium: Bonney Field; Attendance: 11,442; Referee: Alex Chilowicz

October 3, 2015 SF	Orange County Blues	0–2	LA Galaxy II	Carson, California
7:00 pm PDT	Navarro (yellow card) 18'; Petričević (yellow card) 90+'	Report; Report	Lassiter 14', 54'; McBean (yellow card) 47'; Walker (yellow card) 79'; Covarrubias (yellow card) 89'	Stadium: StubHub Center; Attendance: 2,047; Referee: Chipalo Street

October 4, 2015 SF	Oklahoma City Energy FC	2–2 (a.e.t.) (4–3 p)	Colorado Springs Switchbacks FC	Oklahoma City
6:00 pm CDT	Sanchez 45+'; Thomas (yellow card) 90'; Doue 98' (yellow card) 99'	Report; Report	Vercollone 6'; Burt (yellow card) 14'; Argueta (yellow card) 39'; Armstrong (yellow card) 90+'; King 105'; González (yellow card) 105+'	Stadium: Taft Stadium; Attendance: 6,370; Referee: Rubiel Vazquez
	Penalties
	König (penalty scored); Evans (penalty scored); Thomas (penalty scored); Ryden (penalty scored)		(penalty scored) Vercollone; (penalty missed) Maybin; (penalty scored) Robinson; (penalty scored) Hoffman; (penalty missed) González

October 11, 2015 F	Oklahoma City Energy FC	1–2	LA Galaxy II	Oklahoma City
6:00 pm CDT	Evans (yellow card) 31'; Andrews 66'	Report; Report; Report	Lassiter 7'; Auras 23'; Maganto (yellow card) 89'	Stadium: Taft Stadium; Attendance: 7,654; Referee: Jaime Herrera

=== USL Championship ===
October 16, 2015	Rochester Rhinos	2–1 (a.e.t.)	LA Galaxy II	Rochester, New York
7:30 pm EDT	Bourdeau (yellow card) 58'; Forbes (yellow card) 82'; Samuels 90+1', 113'	Report; Report; Report	Walker (yellow card) 45'; Lassiter 65'; Maganto (yellow card) 86'	Stadium: Sahlen's Stadium; Attendance: 5,247; Referee: Nima Saghafi

Championship Game MVP: (Jamaica) Asani Samuels (ROC)

== Attendance ==
=== Average home attendances ===
Ranked from highest to lowest average attendance.

Team	GP	Total	High	Low	Average
Sacramento Republic FC	14	158,516	11,442	10,906	11,323
Louisville City FC	14	94,707	8,414	4,772	6,765
Rochester Rhinos	14	77,976	6,922	4,251	5,570
Saint Louis FC	14	68,388	5,662	4,004	4,885
Tulsa Roughnecks FC	14	65,999	8,335	3,189	4,714
Real Monarchs	14	65,770	13,979	1,001	4,698
Oklahoma City Energy FC	14	64,895	6,847	3,133	4,635
Charleston Battery	14	57,113	5,638	3,026	4,080
Richmond Kickers	14	52,452	5,957	1,632	3,747
Arizona United SC	14	46,254	6,108	1,884	3,304
Austin Aztex	14	45,171	5,146	1,439	3,227
Portland Timbers 2	14	43,702	5,892	1,734	3,122
Wilmington Hammerheads	14	41,433	4,265	1,789	2,960
Colorado Springs Switchbacks FC	14	38,121	3,823	2,012	2,723
Pittsburgh Riverhounds	14	36,817	4,297	995	2,630
Harrisburg City Islanders	13^{†}	33,673	4,741	1,652	2,590
Seattle Sounders FC 2	14	31,100	2,951	1,789	2,221
Charlotte Independence	14	25,205	2,241	1,271	1,800
Vancouver Whitecaps FC 2	14	23,545	3,208	1,106	1,682
Orange County Blues FC	14	19,573	3,000	674	1,398
LA Galaxy II	13^{†}	12,602	1,817	507	969
New York Red Bulls II	14	8,334	1,028	191	595
Toronto FC II	13^{†}	6,233	986	50	479
FC Montreal	14	4,383	1,301	112	313
Total	333	1,121,962	13,979	50	3,369

^{†} 1 game not reported

- Updated to games played on September 24, 2015
Sources: United Soccer League, Timbers

== Statistical leaders ==
=== Top scorers ===
(Minimum of 50% of Team Games Played)

Rank	Player	Nation	Club	Goals
1	Matt Fondy	USA	Louisville City FC	22
2	Danni König	DEN	Oklahoma City Energy	21
3	Rob Vincent	ENG	Pittsburgh Riverhounds	18
4	Long Tan	CHN	Arizona United SC	14
4	Luke Vercollone	USA	Colorado Springs Switchbacks	14
6	Jason Yeisley	USA	Richmond Kickers	13
7	Kharlton Belmar	GRN	Portland Timbers 2	12
8	Dane Kelly	JAM	Charleston Battery	11
8	Ariel Lassiter	CRC	LA Galaxy II	11
10	Miguel González	MEX	Colorado Springs Switchbacks	10
10	Kevin Kerr	SCO	Pittsburgh Riverhounds	10
10	Rodrigo López	USA	Sacramento Republic	10
10	Jason Plumhoff	GER	Harrisburg City Islanders	10

=== Top assists ===
(Minimum of 50% of Team Games Played)

Rank	Player	Nation	Club	Assists
1	Bryan Burke	USA	Louisville City FC	10
2	Kevin Kerr	SCO	Pittsburgh Riverhounds	9
2	Luke Vercollone	USA	Colorado Springs Switchbacks	9
4	Chad Bond	WAL	Tulsa Roughnecks	8
4	Raúl Mendiola	MEX	LA Galaxy II	8
6	Matt Fondy	USA	Louisville City FC	7
6	Miguel González	MEX	Colorado Springs Switchbacks	7
6	Jorge Herrera	COL	Charlotte Independence	7
6	Enzo Martínez	URU	Charlotte Independence	7
6	Lebogang Moloto	RSA	Pittsburgh Riverhounds	7

=== Top Goalkeepers ===
(Minimum of 33% of Team Minutes Played)

Rank	Goalkeeper	Club	GP	MINS	SVS	GA	GAA	W–L–T	SHO
1	(United States) Brandon Miller	Rochester Rhinos	21	1845	46	11	0.537	13–1–7	13
2	(Cuba) Odisnel Cooper	Charleston Battery	19	1710	50	18	0.947	10–2–7	6
3	(Senegal) Clément Diop	LA Galaxy II	24	2160	70	27	1.125	11–9–3	8
4	(United States) Calle Brown	Pittsburgh Riverhounds	14	1266	34	16	1.135	5–4–4	5
5	(United States) Devin Perales	Austin Aztex	16	1393	49	18	1.161	5–8–1	5
6	(United States) Scott Goodwin	Louisville City FC	27	2430	87	32	1.185	14–7–6	8
7	(United States) Devala Gorrick	Colorado Springs Switchbacks	21	1890	61	25	1.190	12–7–2	9
8	(United States) Evan Newton	Oklahoma City Energy	27	2430	89	33	1.222	13–6–8	10
9	(Cuba) Pepe Miranda	Orange County Blues FC	25	2250	86	31	1.240	12–8–4	8
10	(United States) Alec Kann	Saint Louis FC	19	1665	74	23	1.243	5–7–7	6

== League awards ==
=== Individual awards ===
- Most Valuable Player: (United States) Matt Fondy (LOU)
- Rookie of the Year: (Grenada) Kharlton Belmar (POR)
- Defender of the Year: (United States) Bryan Burke (LOU)
- Goalkeeper of the Year: (United States) Brandon Miller (ROC)
- Coach of the Year: (United States) Bob Lilley (ROC)

=== All-League Teams ===
First Team

F: (United States) Matt Fondy (LOU), (Denmark) Danni König (OKC), (China) Long Tan (AZU)
M: (United States) Luke Vercollone (COL), (England) Rob Vincent (PIT), (United States) Tony Walls (ROC)
D: (United States) Bryan Burke (LOU), (United States) Shawn Ferguson (CHB), (United States) Daniel Steres (LAG), (United States) Grant Van De Casteele (ROC)
G: (United States) Brandon Miller (ROC)

Second Team

F: (Grenada) Kharlton Belmar (POR), (Jamaica) Dane Kelly (CHB), (United States) Jason Yeisley (RIC)
M: (Wales) Gareth Evans (OKC), (Scotland) Kevin Kerr (PIT), (United States) Rodrigo Lopez (SAC)
D: (United States) Mickey Daly (SAC), (Jamaica) Brenton Griffiths (OCB), (Haiti) Mechack Jerome (CHA), (Montenegro) Nemanja Vukovic (SAC)
G: (Cuba) Odisnel Cooper (CHB)

Week	USL Player of the Week			
Week	Player	Club	Position	Reason
Week 01	(Argentina) Pablo Rossi	Seattle Sounders 2	Midfielder	1G 1A
Week 02	(United States) Darwin Jones	Seattle Sounders 2	Forward	Hat Trick vs. Whitecaps 2
Week 03	(Denmark) Danni König	Oklahoma City Energy	Forward	2G; winning goal in added time
Week 04	(United States) Jason Yeisley	Richmond Kickers	Forward	2G
Week 05	(United States) Rodrigo López	Sacramento Republic	Midfielder	3G
Week 06	(Grenada) Kharlton Belmar	Portland Timbers 2	Forward	2G
Week 07	(United States) John Berner	Charlotte Independence	Goalkeeper	6 Save SO
Week 08	(United States) Marlon Hairston	Charlotte Independence	Defender	1G 1A
Week 09	(China) Long Tan	Arizona United SC	Forward	2G
Week 10	(United States) Matt Fondy	Louisville City FC	Forward	2G
Week 11	(England) Rob Vincent	Pittsburgh Riverhounds	Midfielder	2G
Week 12	(United States) Kyle Greig	Oklahoma City Energy	Forward	2G
Week 13	(Denmark) Danni König	Oklahoma City Energy	Forward	3G in two games
Week 14	(United States) Dan Metzger	New York Red Bulls II	Midfielder	Outstanding Performance
Week 15	(United States) Matt Fondy	Louisville City FC	Forward	Hat Trick vs. Oklahoma City
Week 16	(Spain) Victor Blasco	Vancouver Whitecaps 2	Midfielder	2G
Week 17	(United States) Jake Feener	Tulsa Roughnecks	Goalkeeper	18 saves two games
Week 18	(Canada) Charles Joly	FC Montreal	Forward	Hat Trick vs. St. Louis
Week 19	(United States) Jason Plumhoff	Harrisburg City Islanders	Midfielder	GWG vs. Pittsburgh
Week 20	(England) Rob Vincent	Pittsburgh Riverhounds	Midfielder	Hat Trick vs. Wilmington
Week 21	(Denmark) Danni König	Oklahoma City Energy	Forward	Hat Trick vs. Timbers 2
Week 22	(United States) Matt Fondy	Louisville City FC	Forward	4G vs. Harrisburg
Week 23	(Saint Vincent and the Grenadines) Myron Samuel	Seattle Sounders 2	Forward	2G 1A
Week 24	(United States) Chris Cortez	Orange County Blues	Forward	2G
Week 25	(United States) Matt Fondy	Louisville City FC	Forward	Breaks League Record for Goals in a Season
Week 26	(United States) Shawn Ferguson	Charleston Battery	Defender	Outstanding Defensive Effort
Week 27	(South Africa) Lebogang Moloto	Pittsburgh Riverhounds	Midfielder	2G
