= USL Championship final =

American Division 2 soccer competition

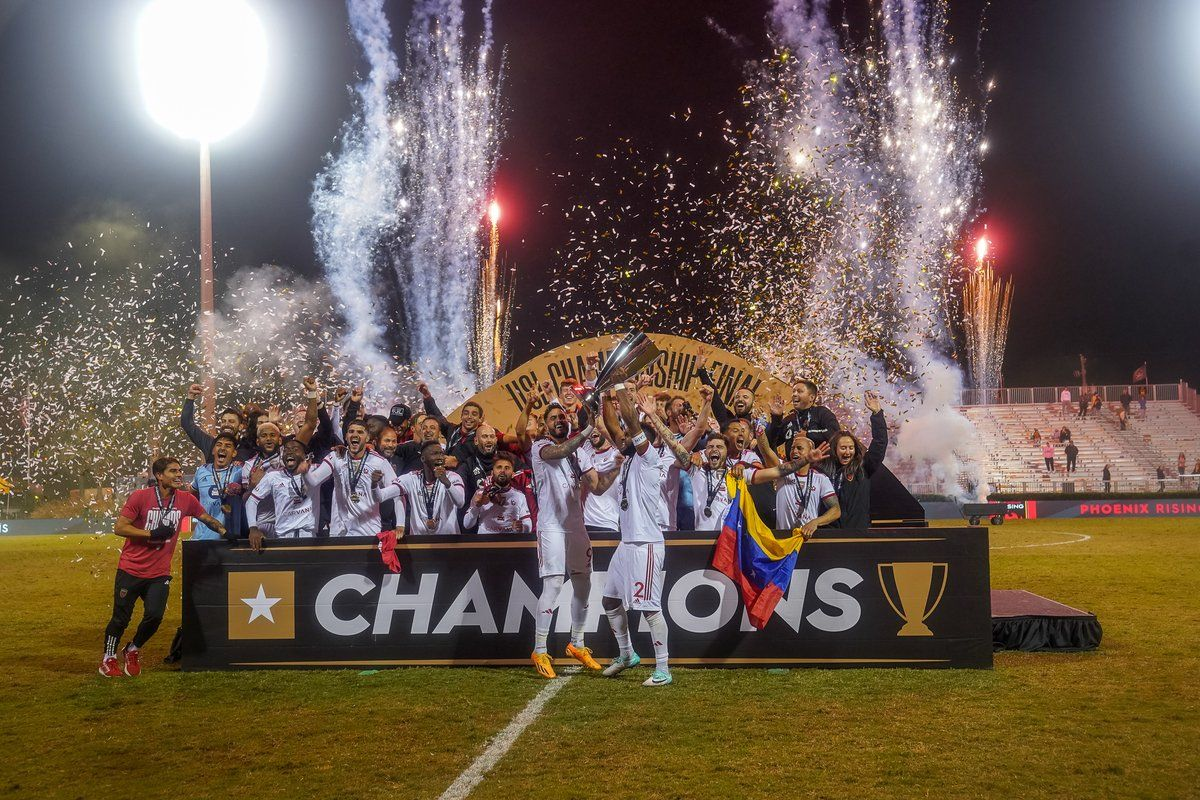
- Phoenix Rising celebrating after the 2023 USL Championship final.
- Organizer(s): USL Championship
- Founded: 2010
- Region: United States (CONCACAF)
- Current champion(s): Phoenix Rising FC (1st title)
- Most championships: Louisville City and Orlando City (2 titles each)
- Broadcaster(s): CBS; ESPN+
- Website: USLSoccer.com
- 2025 USL Championship Playoffs

The USL Championship final is the post-season championship match of the USL Championship, the second tier of professional men's soccer in the United States. The winner is crowned champion in the same manner as in other North American sports leagues (i.e. via a playoff following a regular season).

Unlike most soccer leagues, but much like North American sports leagues, the USL champion does not earn promotion into Major League Soccer, due to the fixed membership structure found in the league.

As of 2026, the USL Championship final is typically held in late-November and features the Eastern Conference champion and Western Conference champion. The predecessor to the USL Championship final was the A-League Championship and the USL-1 Championship.

== Champions ==
=== A-League era (1996–2004) ===
Season	Winner	Score	Runner-up	Box Score
1996	California Jaguars	1–1 (p)	Richmond Kickers	
1997	Milwaukee Rampage	1–1 (p)	Carolina Dynamo	
1998	Rochester Raging Rhinos	3–1	Minnesota Thunder	
1999	Minnesota Thunder	2–1	Rochester Raging Rhinos	
2000	Rochester Raging Rhinos	3–1	Minnesota Thunder	
2001	Rochester Raging Rhinos	2–0	Hershey Wildcats	
2002	Milwaukee Rampage	2–1 (2OT)	Richmond Kickers	
2003	Charleston Battery	3–0	Minnesota Thunder	
2004	Montreal Impact	2–0	Seattle Sounders	

=== USL-1 era (2005–2009) ===
Season	Winner	Score	Runner-up	Venue	Attendance	Box Score
2005	Seattle Sounders	1–1 (p)	Richmond Kickers	Qwest Field	8,011	
2006	Vancouver Whitecaps	3–0	Rochester Raging Rhinos	PAETEC Park	9,547	
2007	Seattle Sounders	4–0	Atlanta Silverbacks	Starfire Sports Complex	4,893	
2008	Vancouver Whitecaps	2–1	Puerto Rico Islanders	Swangard Stadium (Note: The league granted Vancouver the right to host the 2008 final, despite them being the lower seeded team.)	5,822	
2009	Montreal Impact	3–2 (Note: Montreal won the two-legged series 6–3 on aggregate.) 3–1	Vancouver Whitecaps	Swangard Stadium Saputo Stadium	5,886 13,034	

=== USL Championship era (2010–present) ===
Season	Champions	Score	Runners–up	Venue	Attendance	MVP	Box Score
2011	Orlando City	2–2 (p)	Harrisburg City Islanders	Citrus Bowl	11,220	Sean Kelley (ORL)	
2012	Charleston Battery	1–0	Wilmington Hammerheads	Blackbaud Stadium	4,963	Jose Cuevas (CHB)	
2013	Orlando City	7–4	Charlotte Eagles	Citrus Bowl	20,886	Dom Dwyer (ORL)	
2014	Sacramento Republic	2–0	Harrisburg City Islanders	Bonney Field	8,000	Rodrigo López (SAC)	
2015	Rochester Rhinos	2–1 (a.e.t.)	LA Galaxy II	Sahlen's Stadium	5,247	Asani Samuels (ROC)	
2016	New York Red Bulls II	5–1	Swope Park Rangers	Red Bull Arena	5,547	Brandon Allen (NYRB)	
2017	Louisville City FC	1–0	Swope Park Rangers	Louisville Slugger Field	14,456	Paolo DelPiccolo (LOU)	
2018	Louisville City FC	1–0	Phoenix Rising FC	Lynn Stadium	7,025	Luke Spencer (LOU)	
2019	Real Monarchs SLC	3–1	Louisville City FC	Lynn Stadium	7,025	Konrad Plewa (SLC)	
2020	No champion due to COVID-19 pandemic						
2021	Orange County SC	3–1	Tampa Bay Rowdies	Al Lang Stadium	7,521	Ronaldo Damus (OCO)	
2022	San Antonio FC	3–1	Louisville City FC	Toyota Field	8,534	Santiago Patiño (SAFC)	
2023	Phoenix Rising FC	1–1 (p)	Charleston Battery	Patriots Point	5,094	Rocco Ríos Novo (PHX)	
2024	Colorado Springs Switchbacks FC	3–0	Rhode Island FC	Weidner Field	8,023	Juan Tejada (COS)	
2025	Pittsburgh Riverhounds SC	0–0 (p)	FC Tulsa	Oneok Field	9,507	Eric Dick (PIT)	

== Records and statistics ==
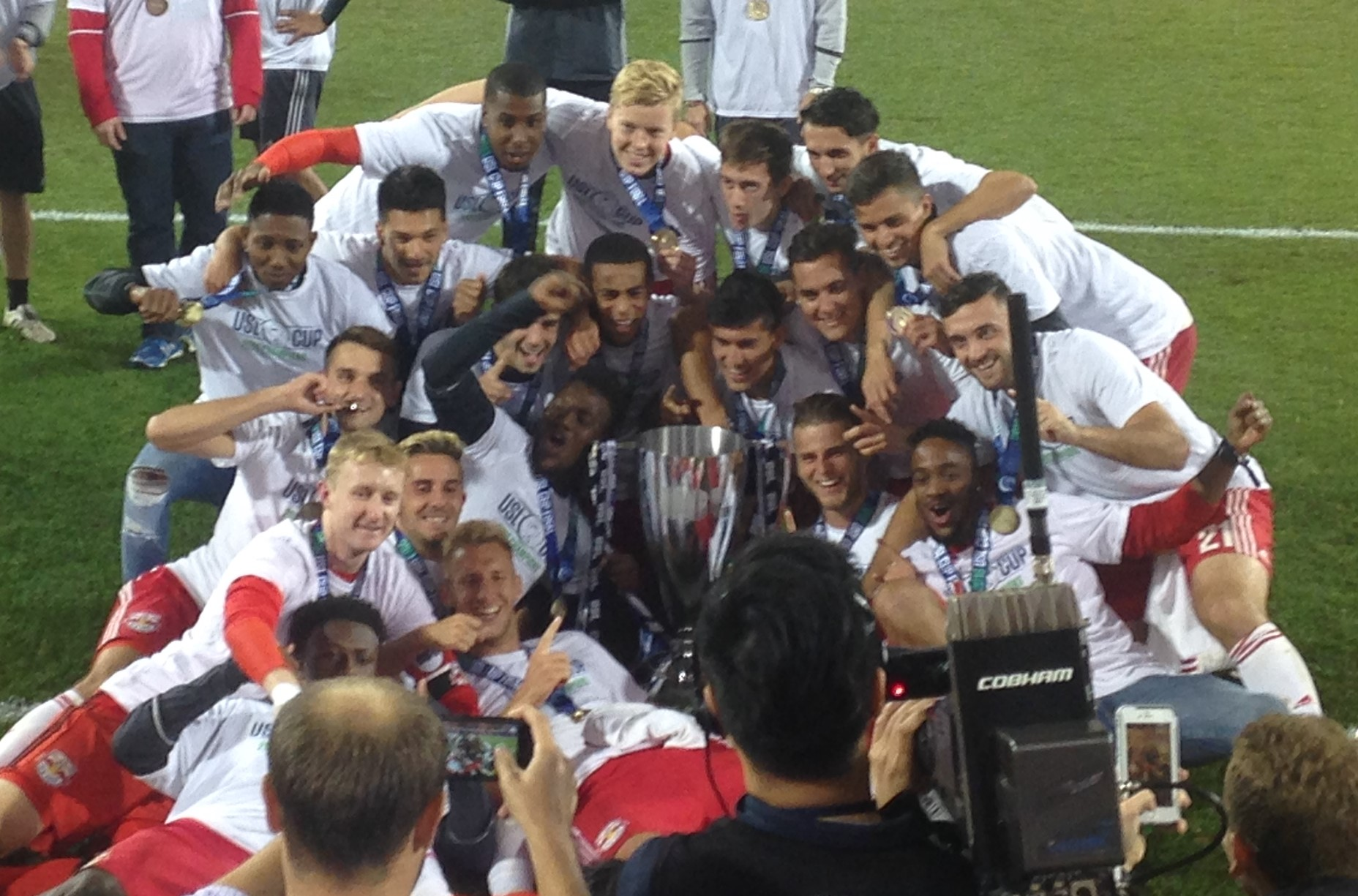
New York Red Bulls II with the 2016 USL trophy.

=== USL Championship titles ===
Club	Winner	Runner-up	Years won	Years runner-up
Louisville City FC	2	2	2017, 2018	2019, 2022
Orlando City SC	2	0	**2011**, 2013	
Charleston Battery	1	1	2012	2023
Phoenix Rising FC	1	1	2023	2018
Sacramento Republic FC	1	0	2014	
Rochester Rhinos	1	0	**2015**	
New York Red Bulls II	1	0	**2016**	
Real Monarchs SLC	1	0	2019	
Orange County SC	1	0	2021	
San Antonio FC	1	0	**2022**	
Colorado Springs Switchbacks FC	1	0	2024	
Pittsburgh Riverhounds SC	1	0	2025	
Harrisburg City Islanders	0	2		2011, 2014
Swope Park Rangers	0	2		2016, 2017
Wilmington Hammerheads FC	0	1		2012
Charlotte Eagles	0	1		2013
LA Galaxy II	0	1		2015
Tampa Bay Rowdies	0	1		**2021**
Rhode Island FC	0	1		2024
FC Tulsa	0	1		2025

Winner	USL Cup champions
**Bold**	Players' Shield champions
Italics	No longer plays in the USL Championship

== See also ==
- MLS Cup
