= Colin Rolfe =

American soccer player

Personal information
- Full name: Colin Rolfe
- Date of birth: February 15, 1990 (age 36)
- Place of birth: Spokane, Washington, United States
- Height: 6 ft 2 in (1.88 m)
- Position: Forward

Youth career
- 2007–2008: Michigan Wolves

College career
| Years | Team | Apps | (Gls) |
| 2008–2011 | Louisville Cardinals | 87 | (33) |

Senior career*
| Years | Team | Apps | (Gls) |
| 2012 | Houston Dynamo | 0 | (0) |
| 2014–2015 | Rochester Rhinos | 51 | (8) |
| 2016 | Real Monarchs | 20 | (1) |
- * Club domestic league appearances and goals as of October 6, 2016

Colin Rolfe (born February 15, 1990, in Spokane, Washington) is an American soccer player.

== Career ==
=== College and amateur ===
Rolfe attended Plymouth High School, where he played on the school soccer team for four seasons, earning All-State honors as a junior and senior.

Rolfe played college soccer at the University of Louisville between 2008 and 2011. During his time at college, he helped the Cardinals win the 2010 Big East Conference Tournament. He was named the 2008 Big East Rookie of the Year, made first team All-Big East in 2009 and 2010, second team All-Big East in 2011, and was an NSCAA first team All American in 2009 and 2010. Rolfe was named a semifinalist for the Hermann Trophy in 2009 and 2010.

=== Professional ===
==== Houston Dynamo ====
On January 12, 2012, Rolfe was drafted in the first round (No. 18 overall) of the 2012 MLS SuperDraft by the Houston Dynamo. On May 29, Rolfe made his professional debut in a 1–0 loss to the San Antonio Scorpions in the U.S. Open Cup.

On December 23, 2012, Rolfe was waived by Houston.

==== Rochester Rhinos ====
Rolfe signed with Rochester Rhinos of USL Pro in March 2014. He made his Rhinos debut on April 5 in a 3–1 loss to Orlando City. On May 28, Rolfe scored in the 119th minute to give Rochester a 2–1 win over Reading United in an Open Cup match. In the Rhinos next Open Cup match, Rolfe scored again to beat D.C. United 1–0. On June 26, Rolfe scored in his third straight Open Cup game, this time a 2–1 loss to the New England Revolution. He scored his first league goal for Rochester on July 11 in a 3–0 win against the FC Dallas Reserves. Rolfe ended his first season in Rochester with 2 goals 2 assists in 25 games as the Rhinos qualified for the playoffs. In their opening match of the playoffs, Rolfe came off the bench in a 2–1 loss to LA Galaxy II. He also ended the season with 3 goals from 3 appearances in Open Cup play.

On April 18, Rolfe scored his first goal of the 2015 season, giving the Rhinos a 1–0 win against Saint Louis FC. He scored 2 goals on September 19 as the Rhinos beat New York Red Bulls II 3–2. Rolfe ended the regular season with 6 goals and 1 assist from 25 appearances, helping the Rhinos finish top of the Eastern Conference. He played in all 3 of Rochester's playoff games as the Rhinos went on to win the 2015 USL Playoffs.

==== Real Monarchs ====
On January 5, 2016, Rolfe signed with USL side Real Monarchs. He made his Monarchs debut on March 26 in a 1–0 win over Saint Louis FC. In their next game, Rolfe scored in a 3–3 draw with LA Galaxy II. He ended the season with just 1 goal from 20 appearances as the Monarchs finished 10th in the Western Conference, missing out on the playoffs.

== Career statistics ==
As of January 27, 2021

| Club | Season | League | | | Open Cup | | Playoffs | | Continental | | Total | |
| Club | Season | Division | Apps | Goals | Apps | Goals | Apps | Goals | Apps | Goals | Apps | Goals |
|---|---|---|---|---|---|---|---|---|---|---|---|---|
| Houston Dynamo | 2012 | MLS | 0 | 0 | 1 | 0 | 0 | 0 | 0 | 0 | 1 | 0 |
| Rochester Rhinos | 2014 | USL Pro | 25 | 2 | 3 | 3 | 1 | 0 | — | | 29 | 5 |
| Rochester Rhinos | 2015 | USL | 25 | 6 | 0 | 0 | 3 | 0 | — | | 28 | 6 |
| Rochester Rhinos | Rhinos Total | | 50 | 8 | 3 | 3 | 4 | 0 | 0 | 0 | 57 | 11 |
| Real Monarchs | 2016 | USL | 20 | 1 | — | | — | | — | | 20 | 1 |
| Career Total | | | 70 | 9 | 4 | 3 | 4 | 0 | 0 | 0 | 78 | 12 |

== Honors ==
Rochester Rhinos

- USL Playoffs: 2015
- USL Regular Season: 2015

== Personal life ==
Born in Spokane, Washington, Rolfe grew up in Canton, Michigan. His parents are Jay and Mary Rolfe. Rolfe went to Plymouth High School where he played on the school soccer and ice hockey teams. At the University of Louisville, Rolfe majored in communications.
