= Jonny Mendoza =

Venezuelan boxer (born 1983)

Jonny Gabriel Mendoza Alvorado (born July 8, 1983) is a male flyweight boxer from Venezuela, who represented his native country at the 2004 Summer Olympics in Athens. There he was eliminated in the second round of the men's flyweight division (– 51 kg) by Namibia's Paulus Ambunda on points: 19-39. He qualified for the Olympic Games by ending up in second place at the 2nd AIBA American 2004 Olympic Qualifying Tournament in Rio de Janeiro.
