= Julian Ringhof =

German footballer

Personal information
- Date of birth: 21 February 1989 (age 37)
- Place of birth: Freiburg, West Germany
- Height: 1.86 m (6 ft 1 in)
- Position: Centre-back

Youth career
- 2000–2009: FC Denzlingen

College career
Years	Team	Apps	(Gls)
2010–2011	Cal State Los Angeles Golden Eagles		
2012–2014	San Diego Toreros		

Senior career*
Years	Team	Apps	(Gls)
2015	Rochester Rhinos	23	(0)
2016	Arizona United	29	(1)
2017–2018	FSV Optik Rathenow	18	(1)
Total		60	(2)
- * Club domestic league appearances and goals

Julian Ringhof (born 21 February 1989) is a German former professional footballer who played as a centre-back.

== Career ==
=== College and amateur ===
Ringhof played five years of college soccer split between time at California State University, Los Angeles and the University of San Diego.

=== Professional ===
Ringhof signed with United Soccer League club Rochester Rhinos on 25 March 2015. The next season, he was signed by Arizona United SC on 18 February 2016.
