= Naggo Head F.C. =

Jamaican football club

- Full name: Naggo's Head Football Club
- Founded: 1979
- Ground: Ferdi Neita Sports Complex; Portmore, Jamaica
- Capacity: 3,000
- League: South Central Confederation Super League
Home colours	Away colours

The Naggo Head Football Club is a Jamaican football club, which currently plays in the South Central Confederation Super League.

The team is based in Portmore, Jamaica, with their home ground at the Ferdi Neita Sports Complex, which can hold a capacity of up to 2000.

== History ==
The team made their debut in the Jamaica National Premier League when they promoted for the 2006/2007 season; relegation followed to the second tier of Jamaican football after finishing the season in last place.

== Achievements ==
- JFF Champions Cup: 1

1997
