= Chuy Sanchez =

Mexican footballer (born 1990)

Personal information
- Full name: Jesus A. Sanchez
- Date of birth: December 25, 1990 (age 35)
- Place of birth: Mazatlan, Sinaloa, Mexico
- Height: 1.68 m (5 ft 6 in)
- Position: Attacking midfielder

Team information
- Current team: Kitsap Soccer Club

Youth career
- 2009–2012: Cal State Bakersfield Roadrunners

Senior career*
Years	Team	Apps	(Gls)
2013–2014	Kitsap Soccer Club	11	(5)
2015	Oklahoma City Energy	23	(2)
2016–	Kitsap Soccer Club	10	(1)
- * Club domestic league appearances and goals as of September 14, 2015

Jesus "Chuy" Sanchez (born December 25, 1990) is a Mexican professional footballer who plays as a midfielder.

== Career ==
=== College and youth ===
Sanchez played four years college soccer at Cal State Bakersfield between 2009 and 2012.

Sanchez signed with USL PDL club Kitsap Pumas in 2013, but never played due to work permit issues. He made 11 appearances and scored 5 goals in 2014.

=== Professional ===
Sanchez signed with United Soccer League club Oklahoma City Energy on January 29, 2015.
