= Devala Gorrick =

American soccer player

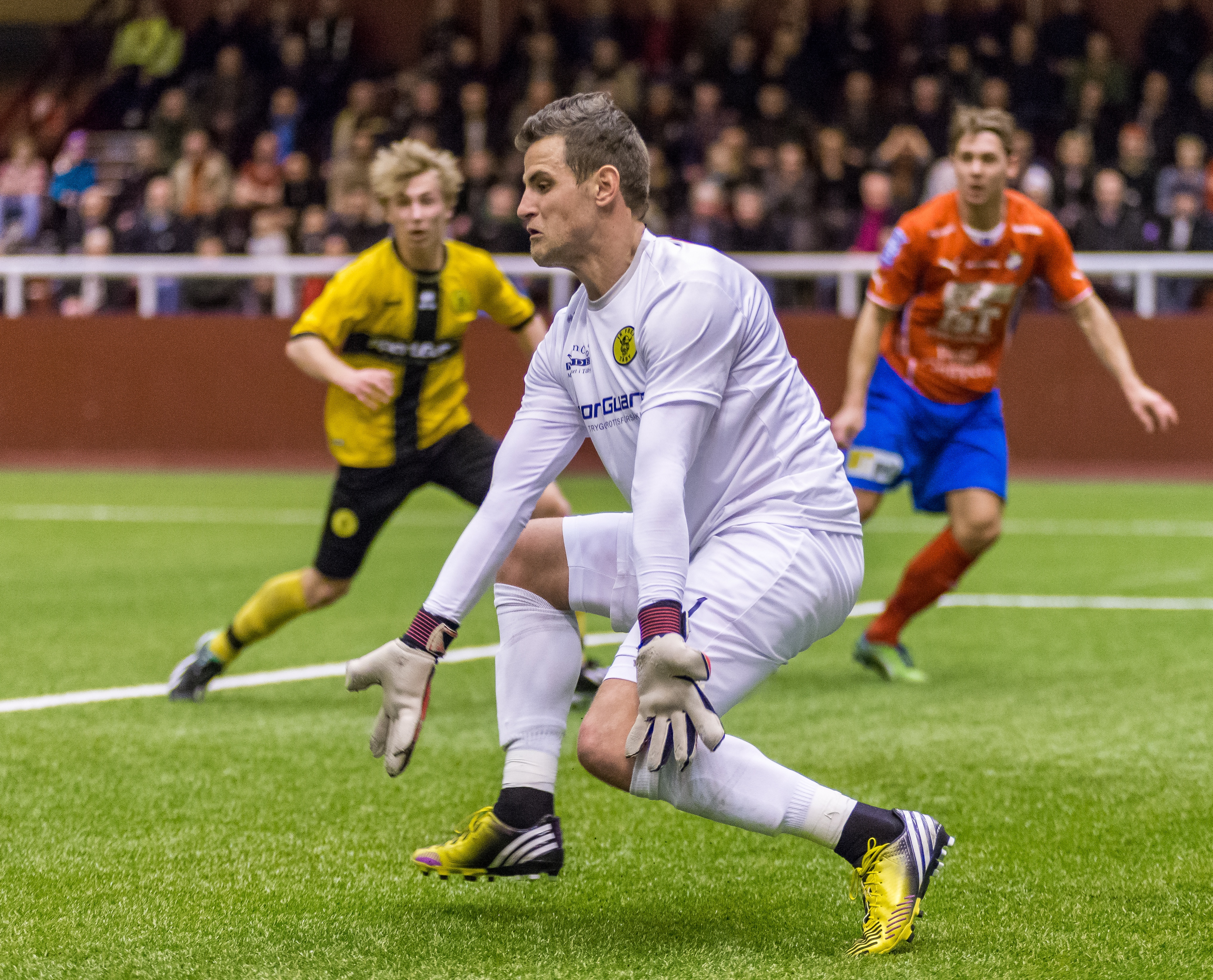

Personal information
- Full name: Devala Gorrick
- Date of birth: July 8, 1987 (age 39)
- Place of birth: Moundsville, West Virginia, United States
- Height: 6 ft 3 in (1.91 m)
- Position: Goalkeeper

Youth career
- 2002: Bayer Leverkusen
- 2003: Austria Wien
- 2006–2007: Tyler Apaches
- 2007–2008: Barry Buccaneers

Senior career*
Years	Team	Apps	(Gls)
2005–2006	Ajax Orlando Prospects	14	(0)
2008	Central Florida Kraze	16	(0)
2009	Bayamon FC	10	(0)
2010	Pattaya United	12	(0)
2011–2012	Air Force United	79	(0)
2013	IK Frej	18	(0)
2014	Ottawa Fury	12	(0)
2015–2016	Colorado Springs Switchbacks	48	(0)
2017	Saint Louis FC	18	(0)
- * Club domestic league appearances and goals as of 11:00, October 20, 2017 (UTC)

Devala Gorrick (born July 8, 1987) is an American professional soccer player who plays as a goalkeeper.

== Early career ==
Gorrick began serious club football at 15 with the former Ajax Orlando Prospects, which was formed as an affiliate to the Dutch pro team Ajax Amsterdam.

When Gorrick was 15 he was sent to the Bundesliga's Bayer Leverkusen Academy for training and trials. He spent three months there gaining professional exposure and experience. He played matches with the youth academy, as well as gained direct training from top flight players such as Hans-Jörg Butt, Lúcio, Klaus Toppmöller and more.

At age 16 Gorrick was sent to Vienna, Austria to house and train with the academy of Austria Wien football club. He spent 2 months with the academy and played matches with the U-16 and U-17 teams. He gained coaching and mentoring from the renowned coach Christoph Daum.

=== College ===
After playing goalkeeper for Santa Fe High School he began his college career with Tyler Junior College in Texas. He was then transferred his junior year to Barry University in Miami where he was the starting goalkeeper his Junior and Senior year posting a 1.73 GAA and was honored as Defensive player of the week on four occasions and also added to the Athletic Deans list. He received his degree in 2009 in Advertising.

== Club career ==
=== Bayamon FC ===
Gorrick started his professional career at FC Barcelona in Puerto Rico. He started 10 games, posted 5 shutouts with a 0.70 GAA. Gorrick played an important role in helping lead Bayamon to be Puerto Rico Soccer League Champions in 2009, winning on aggregate 3–2 over Atletico de San Juan FC.

=== Thailand ===
In 2010, he signed a one-year contract with Thailand football club Pattaya United FC for their 2010 season. During this season, Gorrick, played in the top division of Thai football, the Thai Premier League. Gorrick was the starting goalkeeper for Air Force United F.C. for the 2011 season. Gorrick starred for the club in the Thai Division 1 League for the 2011 season and the Thai Premier League for the 2012 season. In 2012, Gorrick was called up to the Thai Premier League All Star team.

=== IK Frej Sweden ===
Following a trial at IK Frej in the Swedish Division North, Gorrick was offered a two-year contract, on the recommendation of Goalkeeper Coach and former Sweden Goalkeeper Magnus Hedman. Gorrick immediately established himself as the club's first choice keeper. In his second competitive start for the club, Gorrick starred against Swedish Champions League giants Malmö FF pulling off numerous great saves, including a penalty save from Simon Thern. Following the match, Gorrick was described as "excellent" by Malmö FF captain Jiloan Hamad.

During the first half of 2013 Gorrick played 15 regular season games, along with 3 Svenska Cupen matches. For the last 2 months of regular season he was left out of the squad due to minor ankle injury.

=== Ottawa Fury FC ===
Following a successful season in Sweden, Gorrick signed with Ottawa Fury FC in Canada for the 2014 season. He started 12 league matches and played 2 Canadian Championship cup matches.

=== Colorado Springs Switchbacks FC ===
Gorrick signed a contract with the Colorado Springs Switchbacks for the 2015 United Soccer League season.

On January 5, 2016, it was announced that Gorrick had resigned with Colorado Springs Switchbacks for the 2016 United Soccer League season.

=== Saint Louis FC ===
On November 10, 2016 Saint Louis FC has come to terms with midfielder Ivan Mirkovic and goalkeeper Devala Gorrick.

== International career ==
Gorrick has yet to be tapped for the United States international team, however he was invited to train with the team in 2009 to help them prepare for the 2010 World Cup.

== Personal life ==
=== Film career ===
Besides his active soccer career Gorrick is owner of the Alachua based Angry Lion Studios and works as documentary filmmaker and film producer. His first film, Waves of Destruction, was nominated for the Vaisnava Film / Video Festival Awards. The film followed the food relief group Food For Life into the tragedy stricken countries of Sri Lanka & South India after the disastrous tsunami in 2004.

=== Acting ===
Gorrick works as an actor and a commercial model.
