= Gareth Evans (footballer, born 1987) =

Welsh footballer

Personal information
- Full name: Gareth David Evans
- Date of birth: 10 January 1987 (age 39)
- Place of birth: Wrexham, Wales
- Height: 6 ft 1 in (1.85 m)
- Position: Defender

Youth career
- 1997–2001: Brickfield Rangers
- 2000: Chester City FC
- 2001-2002: Hightown YFC
- 2001–2003: Wolverhampton Wanderers

Senior career*
Years	Team	Apps	(Gls)
2003–2004	Cefn Druids	31	(0)
2004–2009	Wrexham	26	(0)
2007	→ Northwich Victoria (loan)	1	(0)
2008	→ Tamworth (loan)	1	(0)
2009	Austin Aztex FC	21	(0)
2009–2010	Vauxhall Motors	1	(0)
2010	Real Maryland Monarchs	17	(0)
2010–2011	→ Chester (loan)	1	(0)
2011	Wilmington Hammerheads FC	20	(0)
2011	Carolina RailHawks	8	(0)
2012–2013	Wilmington Hammerheads FC	48	(1)
2014–2016	OKC Energy	54	(2)

Managerial career
- 2021–: OKC Energy (asst.)
- * Club domestic league appearances and goals as of 10 June 2021

Gareth David Evans (born 10 January 1987) is a Welsh retired footballer. Evans is currently an assistant coach for OKC Energy FC in the USL Championship.

== Career ==
=== England and Wales ===
Evans his career at Brickfield Rangers in the very same youth side as long term school friend Andrew Ruscoe, where they both played at Chester City Youth and Hightown FC together before Gareth went on to represent Crewe Alexandra and then Wolverhampton Wanderers.

Evans is a former Newi Cefn Druids player, who made 31 appearances, 25 as substitute, for the club in the Welsh Premier League during the 2003–04 season. He joined Wrexham in 2004 and signed a professional contract in summer 2006, after initially being told that the club could not afford to give him one.

He broke into the first-team in the 2006–07 season, making 14 league and cup appearances. Manager Denis Smith praised Evans and fellow centre-back, Mike Williams, after a 1–0 win over Darlington in December 2006, saying, "It's possibly the youngest centre-back pairing the club's ever put out and I think they did tremendously well. I'm delighted with the way they played and I think the lads applied themselves well in difficult circumstances." Evans signed a new two-year contract in May 2007.

Evans was loaned to Northwich Victoria and Tamworth during the 2007–08 season but also made another 14 league and cup appearances for Wrexham as the club unsuccessfully battled against relegation from the Football League.

=== United States ===
Evans left Wrexham in January 2009 to continue his footballing career in the United States, and joined USL First Division club Austin Aztex FC in February 2009. He was released by the Aztex at the end of the 2009 season.

After a brief stint back home with Conference North side Vauxhall Motors in late 2009, Evans signed with USL Second Division side Real Maryland Monarchs in 2010.

In October 2010, Evans joined Chester until March 2011, when he returned to the United States to play for Los Angeles Blues in the USL Professional League. He made his debut for Chester on 9 October as a 76th-minute substitute against Harrogate Railway Athletic.

Upon returning to the United States in spring 2011, Evans trained with LA Blues, with whom he had signed a contract, but did not remain with the club. On 5 April 2011 he signed with Wilmington Hammerheads of the USL Pro. At season's end he joined Carolina RailHawks FC for the remainder of the 2011 North American Soccer League season. Evans re-signed with Wilmington for 2012 on 5 December 2011.

After two seasons with Wilmington, Evans joined Oklahoma City Energy FC for its 2014 season.

Evans retired from professional football following the 2016 season and entered a coaching role with Oklahoma City's youth partner, Oklahoma Energy FC. In June 2021, he returned to the pro club as an assistant coach.
