= Luka Petričević =

Montenegrin footballer

Personal information
- Date of birth: 6 July 1992 (age 34)
- Place of birth: Podgorica, FR Yugoslavia
- Height: 1.78 m (5 ft 10 in)
- Position: Midfielder

Youth career
- Budućnost Podgorica
- OFK Beograd

Senior career*
Years	Team	Apps	(Gls)
2010–2012	PAOK	0	(0)
2011–2012	→ Agrotikos Asteras (loan)	18	(0)
2012–2014	Jagodina	14	(0)
2014	→ Mogren (loan)	23	(1)
2015–2016	Orange County Blues	22	(1)
2016–2017	Mladost Podgorica	29	(0)
2017–2018	Kom	26	(1)
2018–2019	Lovćen	25	(0)

International career
2008–2009	Montenegro U17	3	(0)
2010–2011	Montenegro U19	10	(0)
- * Club domestic league appearances and goals as of 14:49, 20 January 2020 (UTC)

Luka Petričević (Cyrillic: Лука Петричевић; born 6 July 1992) is a Montenegrin footballer who most recently played for FK Lovćen.

== Club career ==
Born in Podgorica, Petričević played with FK Budućnost Podgorica and OFK Beograd during his youth career. He joined PAOK FC in 2010 however he failed to make any league appearance, but instead, he played on loan with Agrotikos Asteras F.C. in the 2011–12 Greek Football League.

In 2012, he left PAOK and moved to Serbia by joining top league side FK Jagodina. He made his debut in the 2012–13 Serbian SuperLiga on 2 March 2013, in an away match against OFK Beograd which Jagodina won by 3–1.

After spending time on loan with Mogren, Petričević signed with third-tier US side Orange County Blues.

== International career ==
Luka Petričević has been a member of the Montenegrin U-17 and U-19 national teams.

== Honours ==
Jagodina

- Serbian Cup: 2013

Orange County Blues

- Western Conference (Regular Season) 2015

Mladost Podgorica

- Montenegrin First League: 2016
