= Brandon Miller (soccer) =

American soccer player (born 1989)

Personal information
- Full name: Brandon Kristopher Miller
- Date of birth: December 26, 1989 (age 36)
- Place of birth: Charlotte, North Carolina, United States
- Height: 6 ft 0 in (1.83 m)
- Position: Goalkeeper

College career
Years	Team	Apps	(Gls)
2008–2011	UNC Wilmington Seahawks		

Senior career*
Years	Team	Apps	(Gls)
2010	Indiana Invaders	1	(0)
2012–2015	Rochester Rhinos	26	(0)
2016	Orange County Blues	17	(0)
2017	Harrisburg City Islanders	25	(0)
2018–2021	Charlotte Independence	67	(0)
- * Club domestic league appearances and goals as of November 4, 2021

Brandon Kristopher Miller (born December 26, 1989, in Charlotte, North Carolina) is a retired American soccer player who played as a goalkeeper.

== Playing career ==
=== Club ===
==== Rochester Rhinos ====
In December 2011, Miller started is professional career signing with the Rochester Rhinos in the USL Pro. After several seasons playing backup, Miller had a breakout season in 2015. Earning 24 appearances, Miller set USL records in both shutouts (13) and goals-against average (0.54). His achievements earned him the 2015 USL Goal Keeper of the Year Award.

==== Orange County Blues ====
Ahead of the 2016 season, Miller signed with Orange County Blues FC. Miller helped the Blues return to the playoffs, but they did not reach the Western Conference finals for a second consecutive season.

==== Harrisburg City Islanders ====
In March 2017, Miller moved back to the USL Eastern Conference and joined the Harrisburg City Islanders. Miller established himself as first choice keeper, but the City Islanders struggled to gain form in 2017 finishing 11th in the Eastern Conference.

==== Charlotte Independence ====
In January 2018, Miller returned to Charlotte signing with Charlotte Independence. In December 2021, Miller announced his retirement from playing professional soccer.

==== Achievements ====
- United Soccer League
- Championship
  - Winners : 2015
- USL Regular Season
  - Winners: 2015
- Eastern Conference
  - Winners (Playoffs): 2015
  - Winners (Regular season): 2015
