= Vasilios Apostolopoulos =

Greek footballer (born 1988)

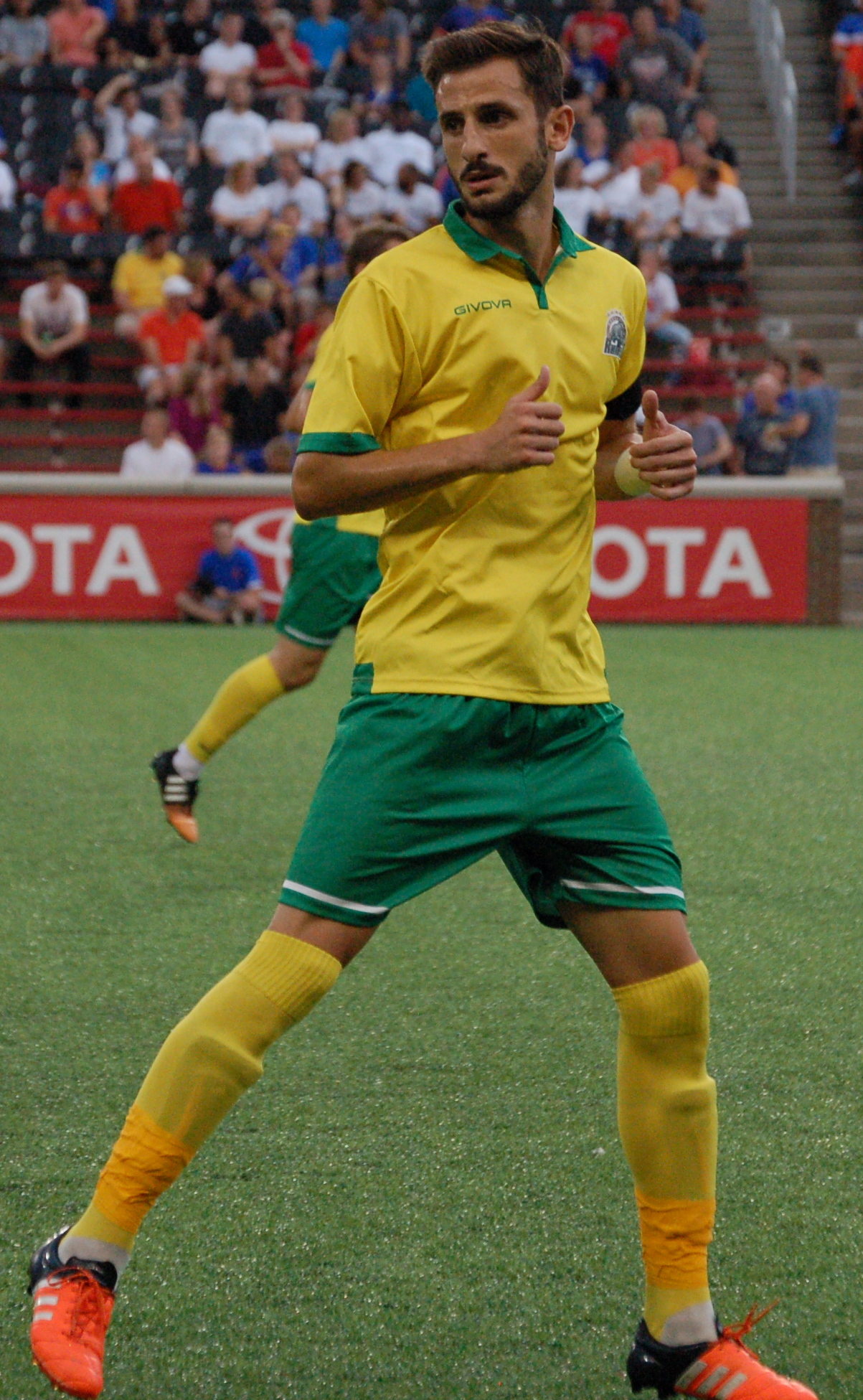
- Apostolopoulos playing with the Rochester Rhinos in 2016

Personal information
- Full name: Vasilios Apostolopoulos
- Date of birth: 13 August 1988 (age 38)
- Place of birth: Athens, Greece
- Height: 1.91 m (6 ft 3 in)
- Position: Centre back

Senior career*
Years	Team	Apps	(Gls)
2006–2011	Atromitos	17	(0)
2011–2014	Videoton	0	(0)
2011–2012	Videoton II	15	(1)
2012–2014	→ Puskás Akadémia (loan)	27	(8)
2015–2016	Rochester Rhinos	59	(1)
2017–2019	Karmiotissa	20	(2)
2019	Aittitos Spata	8	(0)
2019–2020	SK Bischofshofen	12	(0)
2020–2021	Pierikos	10	(0)
2021–2023	Agios Ierotheos		

International career
2006–2007	Greece U19	7	(0)
2008–2010	Greece U21	3	(0)
- * Club domestic league appearances and goals as of 16 June 2021

Vasilios Apostolopoulos (Greek: Βασίλειος Αποστολόπουλος; born 13 August 1988) is a Greek former professional footballer who played as a centre back.

== Career ==
Ahead of the 2019/20 season, Apostolopoulos joined Austrian club SK Bischofshofen.

== Club statistics ==
Club	Season	League		Cup		League Cup		Europe		Total	
Club	Season	Apps	Goals	Apps	Goals	Apps	Goals	Apps	Goals	Apps	Goals
Videoton
Videoton	2011–12	0	0	2	0	6	0	0	0	8	0
Videoton	Total	0	0	2	0	6	0	0	0	8	0
Puskás
Puskás	2012–13	26	8	0	0	0	0	0	0	26	8
Puskás	2013–14	1	0	0	0	1	0	0	0	2	0
Puskás	Total	27	8	0	0	1	0	0	0	28	8
Rochester Rhinos
Rochester Rhinos	2015	10	0	0	0	6	0	0	0	10	0
Rochester Rhinos	Total	0	0	0	0	0	0	0	0	10	0
Career Total		37	8	2	0	7	0	0	0	46	8

Updated to games played as of 8 June 2015.
