= Ignacio Maganto =

Spanish footballer

Personal information
- Full name: Ignacio Maganto Pérez
- Date of birth: 2 January 1992 (age 34)
- Place of birth: Madrid, Spain
- Height: 1.73 m (5 ft 8 in)
- Positions: Winger; forward

Team information
- Current team: México FC

Youth career
- 2006–2011: Getafe

College career
Years	Team	Apps	(Gls)
2011–2014	Iona Gaels	71	(27)

Senior career*
Years	Team	Apps	(Gls)
2014	Reading United	9	(2)
2015	LA Galaxy	13	(1)
2015	→ LA Galaxy II (loan)	9	(0)
2016–2017	Hajduk Split	9	(0)
2017–2018	Sanse	37	(4)
2018–2019	Alcobendas Sport	38	(7)
2019–2023	Unión Adarve	104	(21)
2023–2024	Moscardó	33	(6)
2024–	México FC	6	(0)
- * Club domestic league appearances and goals as of 12 October 2024

Ignacio "Nacho" Maganto Pérez (born 2 January 1992) is a Spanish footballer who plays for México FC.

== Career ==
=== Youth, college and amateur ===
Maganto spent five seasons in the Getafe youth system. Maganto was offered a contract to play for Getafe's B team but instead elected to move to the United States to play football on a scholarship at Iona College. In his four seasons with the Gaels, he made a total of 71 appearances and tallied 27 goals and 14 assists.

He also played in the Premier Development League with Reading United, making a total of 9 appearances and tallied 2 goals.

=== Professional ===
==== LA Galaxy ====
On 15 January 2015, Maganto was selected 21st overall in the 2015 MLS SuperDraft by the LA Galaxy. He signed a professional contract with the club two months later. On 22 March, Maganto made his professional debut with USL affiliate club LA Galaxy II in a 0–0 draw against Real Monarchs SLC. On 19 April, Maganto made another appearance with LA Galaxy II against Austin Aztex FC that ended in a 2–1 victory for the Galaxy.

On 2 May 2015, Maganto made his debut for the first team, starting on the left side of midfield, against Colorado Rapids. Maganto ended his debut early when he was substituted off in the 72nd minute for goal scorer Alan Gordon as the Galaxy completed the game with a 1–1 draw. On 28 May, Magnato played the full 90 minutes for the first time in the home match against Real Salt Lake that ended in a 1–0 win for the Galaxy. Maganto scored a one-touch goal, his first for the Galaxy, in an away game against New England Revolution that ended in a 2–2 draw on 31 May.

He was waived by LA Galaxy on 29 February 2016.

==== Hajduk Split ====
Maganto joined Croatian side Hajduk Split on trial in mid-June 2016, eventually signing with the club on 26 July 2016. After 9 league appearances, of which two were in the starting line-up, Maganto was released by Hajduk on 7 January 2017.

== Career statistics ==
As of 29 February 2016

Club	Season	League			U.S. Open Cup		MLS Cup		CONCACAF		Total	
Club	Season	Division	Apps	Goals	Apps	Goals	Apps	Goals	Apps	Goals	Apps	Goals
LA Galaxy II	2015	USL Pro	9	0	0	0	—	—	—	—	9	0
LA Galaxy	2015	MLS	13	1	3	0	0	0	4	1	20	2
Career total			15	1	3	0	0	0	2	1	29	2
