= Kenardo Forbes =

Jamaican footballer (born 1988)

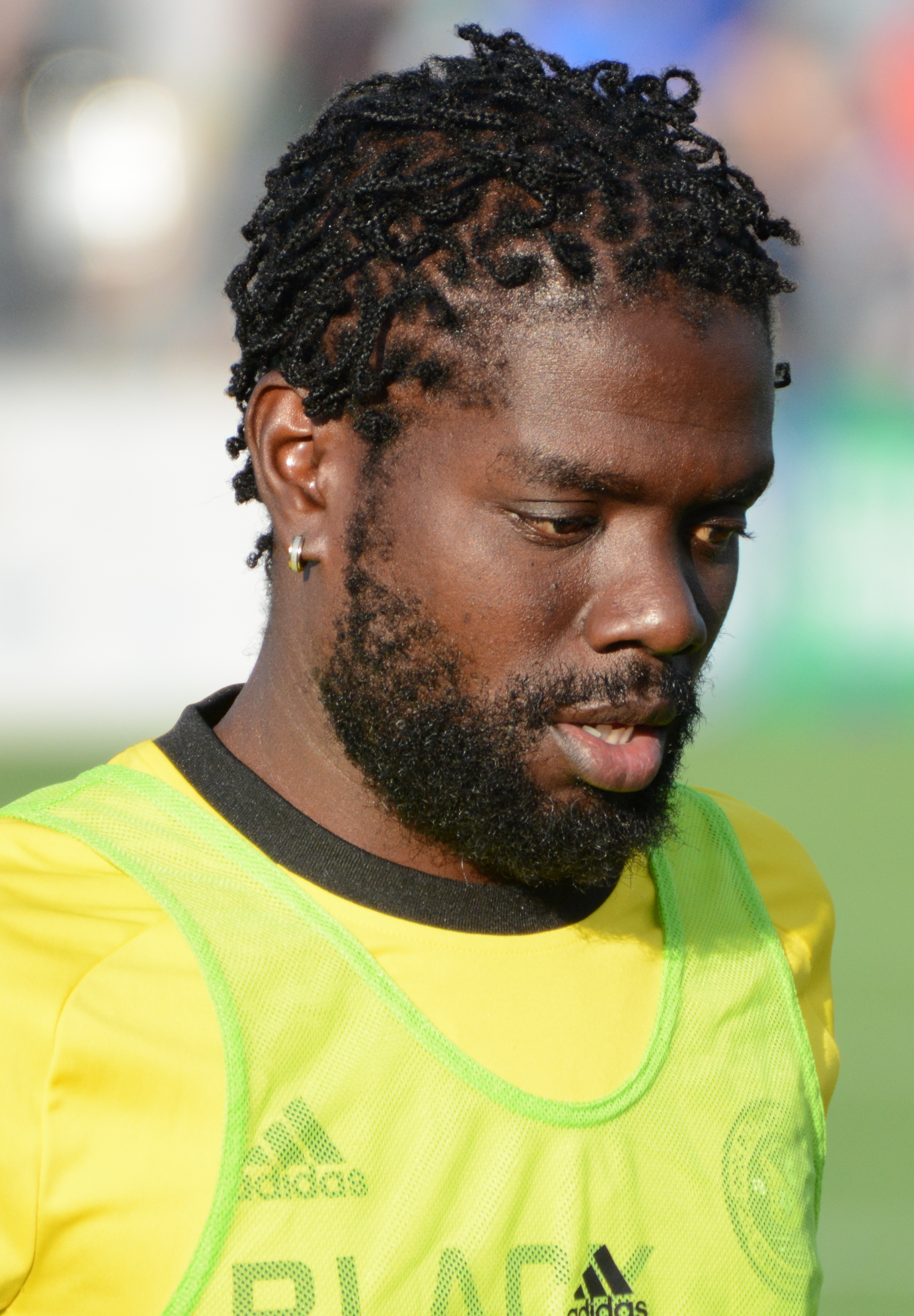
- Forbes with Pittsburgh Riverhounds in 2021

Personal information
- Date of birth: 15 May 1988 (age 38)
- Place of birth: Kingston, Jamaica
- Height: 1.77 m (5 ft 10 in)
- Position: Midfielder

Senior career*
Years	Team	Apps	(Gls)
2006–2007	Naggo Head		
2007–2011	Waterhouse		
2011–2018	Utica City (indoor)	132	(108)
2014	Waterhouse	3	(0)
2015–2017	Rochester Rhinos	85	(9)
2018–2024	Pittsburgh Riverhounds SC	210	(19)

International career^{‡}
2010	Jamaica	3	(0)
- * Club domestic league appearances and goals as of 11 November 2024 ‡ National team caps and goals as of 23 November 2014

Kenardo Forbes (born 15 May 1988) is a Jamaican retired footballer who played as a midfielder.

== Career ==
=== Club ===
Forbes has played club football for Naggo Head, Waterhouse and Syracuse Silver Knights.

Forbes signed for the Rochester Rhinos in USL for 2015.

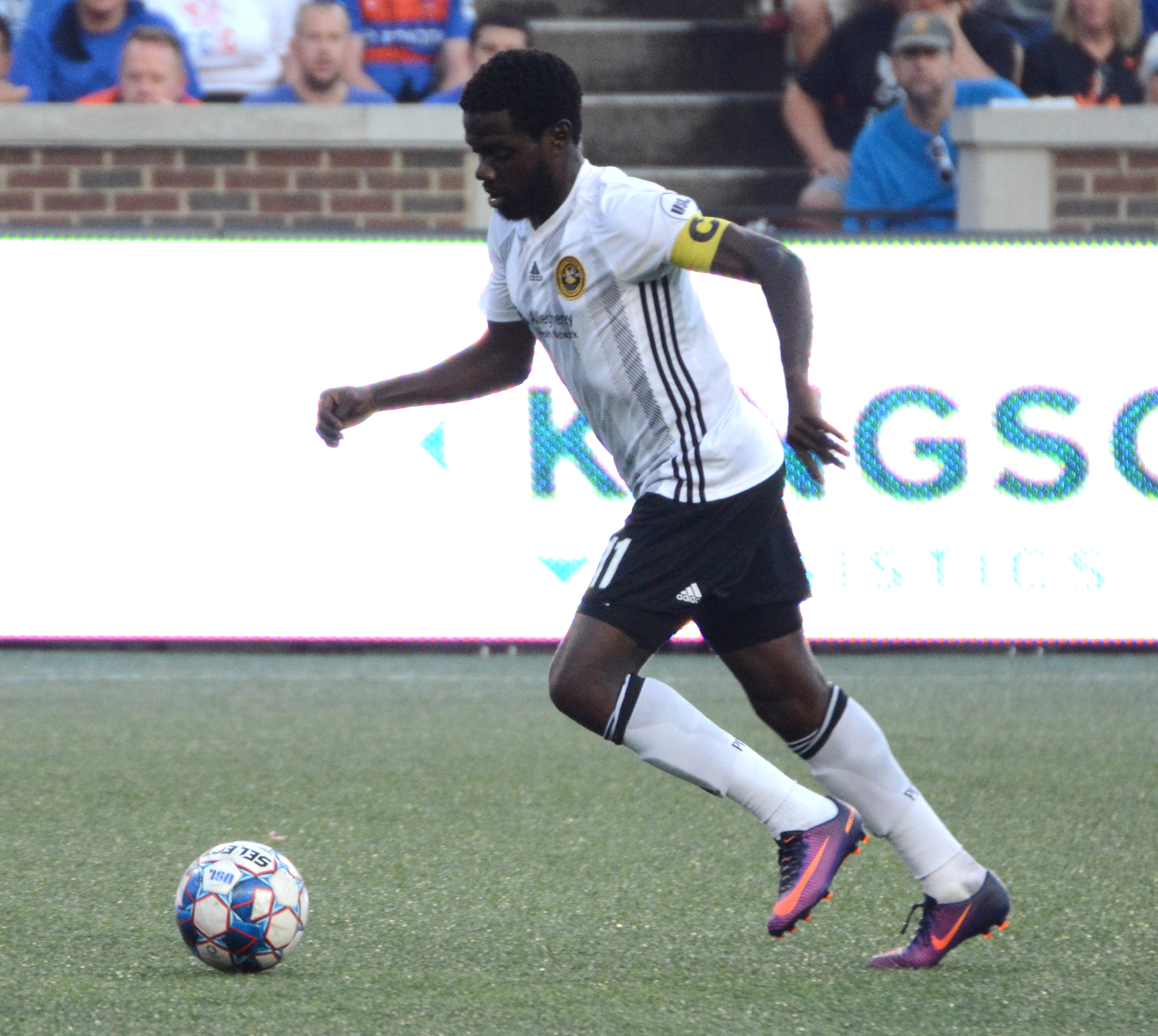
Forbes playing for Pittsburgh Riverhounds in 2018

On 21 December 2017, Forbes signed for Pittsburgh Riverhounds SC on a one-year contract with an option for 2019. Forbes is the all-time appearance leader for the Riverhounds.

On 14 March 2025, Forbes announced his retirement from playing professional football.

=== International ===
He made his international debut for Jamaica in 2010.

== Honours ==
Individual

- USL All-League First Team (2): 2019, 2020
- USL All-League Second Team (5): 2016, 2017, 2018, 2021, 2022
- 2015 Syracuse Silver Knights Offensive MVP
