= Grant Van De Casteele =

American soccer player

Personal information
- Date of birth: May 10, 1991 (age 35)
- Place of birth: Plano, Texas, United States
- Height: 1.88 m (6 ft 2 in)
- Position: Defender

Youth career
- 2001–2009: Andromeda

College career
Years	Team	Apps	(Gls)
2009–2013	Notre Dame Fighting Irish		

Senior career*
Years	Team	Apps	(Gls)
2014	Colorado Rapids	1	(0)
2015	Rochester Rhinos	20	(2)
- * Club domestic league appearances and goals as of August 27, 2015

Grant Van De Casteele (born May 10, 1991) is an American professional soccer player who plays as a defender.

== Career ==
=== College ===
Van De Casteele played four years of college soccer at the University of Notre Dame between 2010 and 2014. He was elected captain his senior year and helped steer the Irish to the program's first ever national championship in his final collegiate season.

=== Professional ===
On January 16, 2014, Van De Casteele was selected in the first round, 19th overall, in the 2014 MLS SuperDraft by Colorado Rapids.

Van De Casteele made his debut in a 3–4 loss to LA Galaxy on August 20, 2014. He was released by the Rapids on March 6, 2015.

In February 2016, Van De Casteele retired from professional soccer to pursue other professional interests.
