= Tony Walls =

American soccer player

Personal information
- Date of birth: January 16, 1990 (age 36)
- Place of birth: Wauwatosa, Wisconsin, United States
- Height: 1.80 m (5 ft 11 in)
- Positions: Defender (outdoor); Forward (indoor)

Team information
- Current team: Milwaukee Wave
- Number: 20

Youth career
- 2001: Tosa Burn
- 2002–2008: FC Milwaukee

College career
Years	Team	Apps	(Gls)
2008–2011	Green Bay Phoenix	74	(18)

Senior career*
Years	Team	Apps	(Gls)
2009, 2011	Michigan Bucks	11	(1)
2012	Chicago Fire	0	(0)
2013–2016	Milwaukee Wave (indoor)	44	(27)
2014–2016	Rochester Rhinos	61	(5)
2016–2018	Cedar Rapids Rampage (indoor)	35	(25)
2017–2018	Saint Louis FC	40	(3)
2018–2019	Ontario Fury (indoor)	9	(3)
2019	Chattanooga Red Wolves	24	(2)
2019–2023	St. Louis Ambush (indoor)	49	(32)
2020	Pittsburgh Riverhounds	1	(0)
2023–	Milwaukee Wave (indoor)	27	(6)
- * Club domestic league appearances and goals as of November 27, 2024

Tony Walls (born January 16, 1990) is an American soccer player currently playing for the Milwaukee Wave in the Major Arena Soccer League.

== Career ==
=== College and amateur ===
Walls played four years of college soccer & one year of college basketball at the University of Wisconsin–Green Bay between 2008 and 2011. Walls earned a few accolades throughout his college career including: 2008 Horizon League Newcomer of the year & Second Team all conference as a freshman. In addition, he earned 1st Team all Horizon league for three consecutive seasons in 2009-2011 & earned Horizon League Player of the year in 2011. Only player to appear on the Herman Trophy watch list (2010) in school history, only player to score a goal in the NCAA tournament in school history, and the first player UWGB history to sign an MLS contract.

While at college, Walls also appeared for USL PDL club Michigan Bucks in 2009 and 2011 & Chicago Fire PDL in 2010.

=== Professional ===
On January 17, 2012, Walls was drafted in the third round (47th overall) of the 2012 MLS Supplemental Draft by Chicago Fire. Walls appeared in 16/16 MLS reserve league matches. Also appearing in matches against Santos Laguna from Liga MX and Aston Villa from the English Premier League. He spent 2012 with the club before being waived on February 21, 2013.

After spending 2013 with Professional Arena Soccer League team Milwaukee Wave, Walls returned to outdoor soccer when he signed for USL Pro club Rochester Rhinos on April 2, 2014. Following his first season with the Rhinos, Walls played in 28/29 matches, led the team in minutes (2,217) and won Team Defensive MVP for the 2014 season.

In 2015 Walls was named captain of the Rochester Rhinos who would go on to win the USL regular season championship, Eastern conference championship, and USL Championship. The team conceded only 16 goals in 28 games, the fewest in league history, and lost only one match in 40 total competitions. Walls recorded 4 goals, 2 assists. Walls appeared in every matched and started all but one, led the team in minutes and was named Team MVP, 1st team all-league, and finished third in the voting for league MVP.

In 2016, Walls went on trial with Houston Dynamo and both Minnesota United but returned to Rochester. Walls endured a slew of injuries and recorded only one goal and one assist.

Walls signed with Saint Louis FC in April 2017. Walls quickly became a mainstay for Preki, the US soccer legend. Walls appeared in 23 matches and started 21. He led the team in passes with 992, and passing percentage, recording 82.2% completion rate on the season. Although signing a few games into the season, Walls finished second on the team in minutes with 1,953.

Walls was one of three players that returned to Saint Louis FC from 2017 under new head coach Anthony Pulis. A partial calf tear only made Walls unavailable for 8 weeks after scoring in the first match of the season. Walls managed to make 18 appearances and start 14 matches. Walls would play a crucial role in Saint Louis FC making their first every playoff appearance, starting in the last 9 regular season matches. Walls recorded 1,254 minutes, 83% passing completion percentage to go along with 2 goals on the season.

Walls would join the Ontario Fury of MASL for the 2018–2019 before signing with Chattanooga Red Wolves of USL league one for their inaugural season.

Walls signed with the USL Championship's Pittsburgh Riverhounds SC in January 2020.

Walls returned to the Milwaukee Wave on February 23, 2023. Since returning, Walls has made 32 appearances, adding 7 goals, 4 assists, and 21 blocks. Milwaukee has been to back to back conference finals since Walls' return.
