= Nathan Bourdeau =

American soccer player

Personal information
- Full name: Nathan Bourdeau
- Date of birth: August 10, 1990 (age 36)
- Place of birth: Baldwinsville, New York
- Height: 5 ft 9 in (1.75 m)
- Position: Midfielder

Team information
- Current team: Utica City
- Number: 19

College career
Years	Team	Apps	(Gls)
2008	Boston College Eagles		
2009–2012	Rutgers Scarlet Knights		

Senior career*
Years	Team	Apps	(Gls)
2012–	Utica City FC (indoor)	200	(99)
2015	Rochester Rhinos	3	(0)
2021	→ Florida Tropics (indoor; loan)	5	(2)

International career
2008	United States U-18		
2023	United States futsal national team		
- * Club domestic league appearances and goals as of 27 November 2024

Nathan Bourdeau (born August 10, 1990) is an American professional soccer player who currently plays for Utica City FC in the Major Arena Soccer League.

== College and amateur ==
Nathan attended Baldwinsville High School where he is the schools all-time leader in goals and assists. Bourdeau was a 6-year member of Region 1 ODP team and a U-18 US National team member.

He played college soccer at Boston College in 2008, where he was part of a top 15 recruiting class, according to ESPN.com before transferring to Rutgers University in his sophomore year. While at Rutgers University, Bourdeau was named team MVP, All-Big East team and captain while leading them to a sweet 16.

== Professional ==
Since graduating college, Bourdeau has played for indoor side Utica City FC, who were known as the Syracuse Silver Knights until 2018–19. In 2015, he was part of a Rochester Rhinos team that went on to win the USL championship vs. LA Galaxy II.

On February 13, 2021, Bordeau joined Florida Tropics SC for the remainder of the 2020-21 Major Arena Soccer League season, after Utica City FC elected to sit out.
