= Konrad Plewa =

Polish footballer (born 1992)

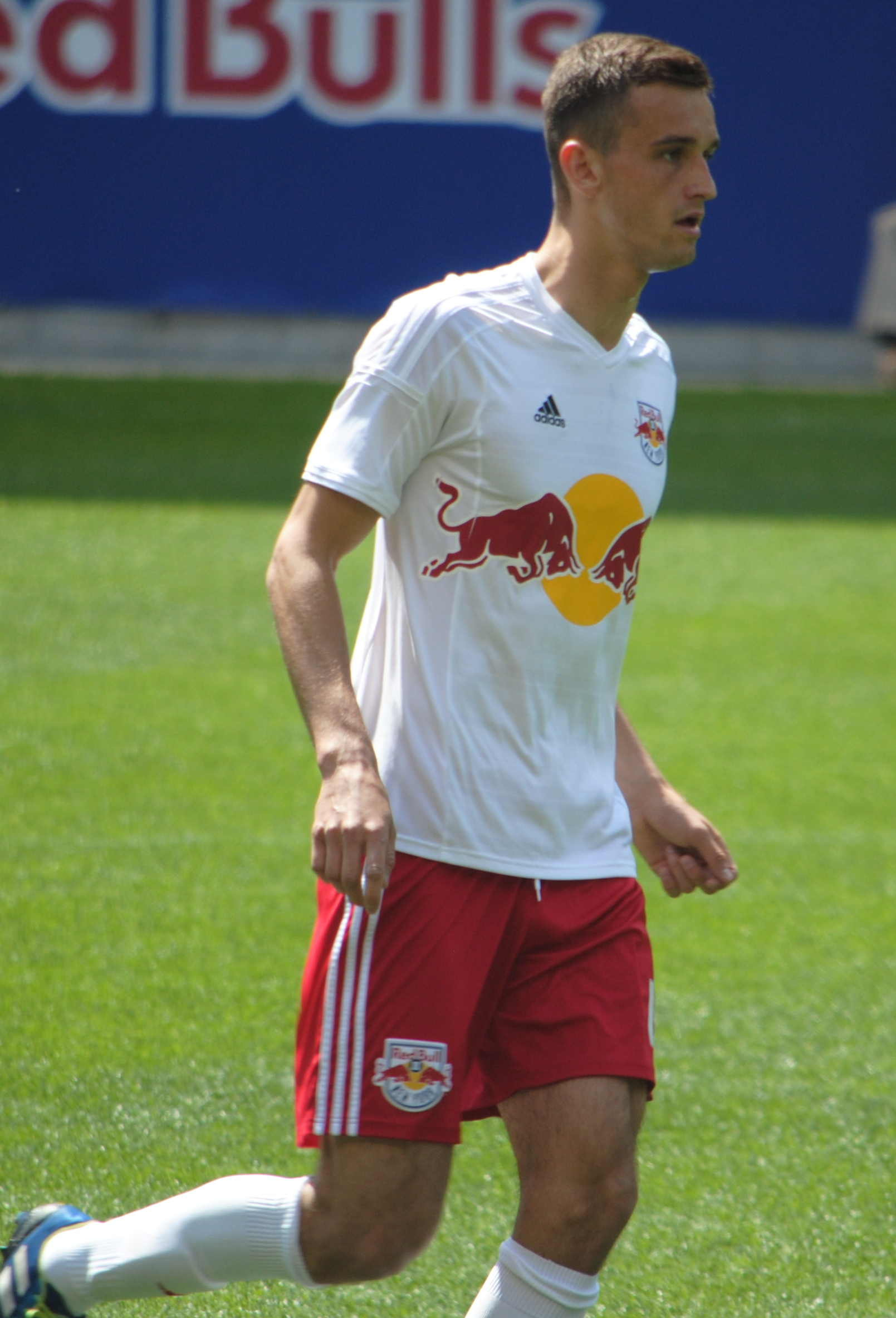

Personal information
- Full name: Konrad Plewa
- Date of birth: 27 February 1992 (age 34)
- Place of birth: Maniowy, Poland
- Height: 1.90 m (6 ft 3 in)
- Position: Defender

Youth career
- 2010–2011: New York Red Bulls

College career
Years	Team	Apps	(Gls)
2011–2014	Seton Hall Pirates		

Senior career*
Years	Team	Apps	(Gls)
2015–2016	New York Red Bulls II	47	(3)
2017	Saint Louis FC	20	(1)
2018–2019	Real Monarchs	30	(4)
2020	New York Cosmos	4	(0)
- * Club domestic league appearances and goals

Konrad Plewa (born 27 February 1992) is a Polish former professional footballer who played as a defender.

== Career ==
=== Youth and college ===
Plewa played for the New York Red Bulls Academy since 2010. During the 2012 and 2013 seasons he played for the New York Red Bulls U-23 in the National Premier Soccer League. Plewa also played college soccer for Seton Hall University from 2010 to 2014. While with the Pirates he played in 54 matches scoring five goals and recording nine assists.

=== Professional ===
In May 2013 Plewa went on trial with top Polish club Wisła Kraków.

Plewa signed with New York Red Bulls II for the 2015 season and made his debut as a starter for the side in its first ever match on 28 March 2015 in a 0–0 draw with Rochester Rhinos. On 20 June 2015 Plewa scored his first goal for the club, opening the scoring in a 2–0 victory over Louisville City FC. On 27 June 2015 Plewa scored two second half goals for New York in a 4–1 victory over Saint Louis FC. His performance against Saint Louis earned Plewa USL Team of the Week honors.

On 23 July 2015, Plewa made his debut with the New York Red Bulls first team in a 4–2 victory over Premier League Champions Chelsea in a 2015 International Champions Cup match. On 22 May 2016, Plewa assisted Junior Flemmings on a late match winner helping New York to a 1–0 victory against FC Montreal and was named to the USL Team of the Week for his performance.

On 30 July 2016, Plewa suffered a stroke following their game against Richmond Kickers caused by Protein S deficiency which is a rare blood disorder which can lead to an increased risk of thrombosis. After returning from his health scare, Plewa appeared for New York in every match during the team's playoff run, and on 23 October 2016, helped the club to a 5–1 victory over Swope Park Rangers in the 2016 USL Cup Final.

On 27 January 2017, Saint Louis FC has announced the signing of defender Konrad Plewa from the New York Red Bulls II, pending United States Soccer Federation approval.

On 10 March 2020, after two seasons with Real Monarchs in the USL Championship, Plewa joined New York Cosmos ahead of their inaugural fall season in the National Independent Soccer Association.

== Career statistics ==
As of 28 September 2020

Appearances and goals by club, season and competition
Club	Season	League		Playoffs		U.S. Open Cup		CONCACAF		Total	
Club	Season	Apps	Goals	Apps	Goals	Apps	Goals	Apps	Goals	Apps	Goals
New York Red Bulls II	2015	24	3	2	0	1	0	0	0	27	3
New York Red Bulls II	2016	23	0	4	0	0	0	0	0	27	0
New York Red Bulls II	Total	47	3	6	0	1	0	0	0	54	3
Saint Louis FC	2017	20	1	0	0	0	0	0	0	20	1
Real Monarchs	2018	11	2	1	0	0	0	0	0	12	2
Real Monarchs	2019	19	2	4	1	0	0	0	0	23	3
Real Monarchs	Total	30	4	5	1	0	0	0	0	35	5
New York Cosmos	2020–21	4	0	3	0	0	0	0	0	7	0
Career total		101	8	14	1	1	0	0	0	116	9

== Honors ==
New York Red Bulls II

- USL Cup: 2016

Real Monarchs

- USL Championship: 2019
