= Steevan Dos Santos =

Cape Verdean footballer (born 1989)

Steevan dos Santos
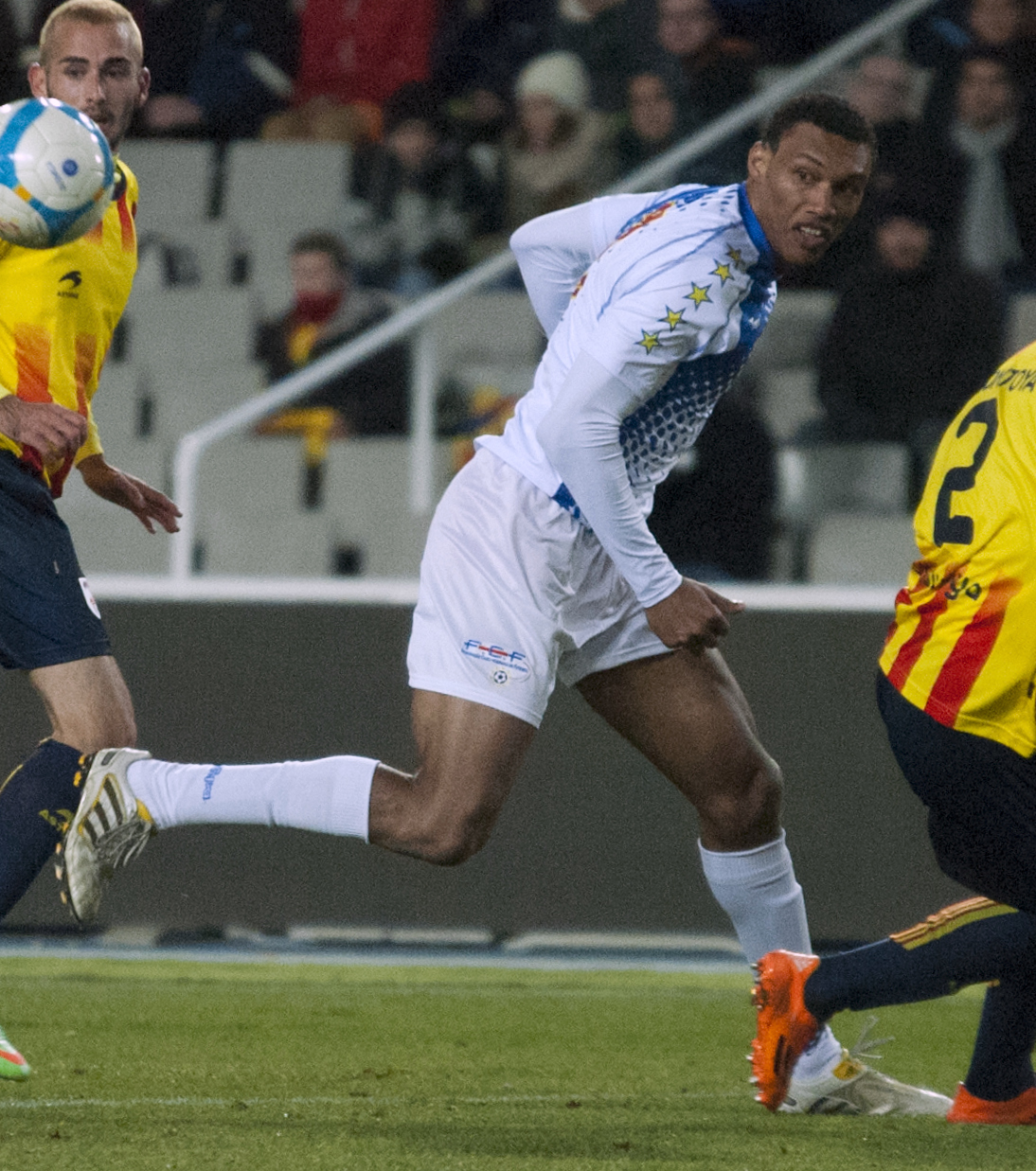

Personal information
- Full name: Steevan Humberto Fortes dos Santos
- Date of birth: 17 September 1989 (age 37)
- Place of birth: Mindelo, Cape Verde
- Height: 1.93 m (6 ft 4 in)
- Position: Forward

Senior career*
Years	Team	Apps	(Gls)
2007–2012	CS Mindelense		
2012–2014	Ullensaker/Kisa IL	49	(21)
2014–2015	Progresso		
2015–2016	Rochester Rhinos	48	(17)
2017–2018	Ottawa Fury FC	56	(15)
2019–2020	Pittsburgh Riverhounds	47	(15)
2021–2022	Tampa Bay Rowdies	47	(19)
2023–2024	Union Omaha	42	(18)
- * Club domestic league appearances and goals as of 25 November 2024

Steevan Humberto Fortes dos Santos (born 17 September 1989), also known as "Duba", is a Cape Verdean former footballer who played as a forward for Union Omaha of USL League One until his retirement after the 2024 season.

== Career ==
Duba began his career in his native Cape Verde with CS Mindelense, before moving to Norway with Ullensaker/Kisa IL in 2012. After a short period with Angola's Progresso, Duba signed with United Soccer League club Rochester Rhinos on 27 March 2015.

After two seasons with Ottawa Fury FC, Duba joined Pittsburgh Riverhounds SC on 8 January 2019 on a one-year deal.

On 24 December 2020, it was announced that Duba would join USL Championship side Tampa Bay Rowdies ahead of their 2021 season. He was released by Tampa following their 2022 season.

Dos Santos signed with Union Omaha on 7 February 2023.
