= Asani Samuels =

Jamaican footballer (born 1992)

Personal information
- Date of birth: 20 March 1992 (age 34)
- Place of birth: Savanna la Mar, Jamaica
- Height: 1.96 m (6 ft 5 in)
- Position: Forward

Youth career
- 2011–2014: Canisius Golden Griffins

Senior career*
Years	Team	Apps	(Gls)
2013	FC Buffalo	10	(1)
2015–2016	Rochester Rhinos	30	(3)
- * Club domestic league appearances and goals as of 15 October 2016

Asani Samuels (born 20 March 1992) is a Jamaican professional footballer.

== Career ==
=== College & Youth ===
Samuels played four years of college soccer at Canisius College between 2011 and 2014.

Samuels also made 10 appearances for NPSL club FC Buffalo in 2013, scoring one goal.

=== Professional ===
Samuels joined United Soccer League club Rochester Rhinos on 27 March 2015.

Samuels won the MVP at the conclusion of the 2015 USL Championship as he scored twice (90+1, 113') to help the Rochester Rhinos secure the USL title.

== Honors ==
- United Soccer League
- USL Championship
  - Winner : 2015
- USL Regular Season
  - Winner: 2015
- USL Eastern Conference (Playoffs)
  - Winner: 2015
- USL Eastern Conference (Regular Season)
  - Winner: 2015
