= 2019 Memphis 901 FC season =

Memphis 901 FC
2019 season
- Head coach: Tim Mulqueen
- Stadium: AutoZone Park; Memphis, Tennessee
- USL: Conference: 15th
- USL Playoffs: Did not qualify
- 2019 U.S. Open Cup: 2nd round
- Highest home attendance: League/All: 8,062 (March 9 vs. Tampa)
- Lowest home attendance: League: 4,142 (Sep 24 vs. Pittsburgh); All: 1,819 (May 29 vs. Hartford, USOC )
- Average home league attendance: 6,623
- Biggest win: 5–0 (Sep 28 vs. Bethlehem Steel)
- Biggest defeat: 0–5 (August 24 at Tampa)

The 2019 Memphis 901 FC season was the inaugural season for Memphis 901 FC in the USL Championship, the second-tier professional soccer league in the United States and Canada.

== Club ==
=== Roster ===
As of August 2, 2019

| No. | Position | Player | Nation |
|---|---|---|---|
| 1 | GK | USA | Jeff Caldwell (on loan from New York City FC) |
| 2 | MF | USA | Morgan Hackworth |
| 3 | DF | KEN | Abdi Mohamed (on loan from New York City FC) |
| 4 | MF | ENG | Damani Holness |
| 5 | DF | TTO | Triston Hodge (on loan from W Connection) |
| 6 | MF | USA | Dan Metzger |
| 7 | MF | USA | Raul Gonzalez |
| 8 | DF | USA | Marc Burch |
| 9 | FW | CAN | Luca Uccello |
| 10 | MF | AFG | Adam Najem |
| 11 | FW | USA | Lagos Kunga (on loan from Atlanta United FC) |
| 13 | FW | USA | Oliver White (on loan to Forward Madison) |
| 15 | DF | USA | Jacob Hauser-Ramsey |
| 17 | MF | JAM | Ewan Grandison |
| 18 | FW | NZL | Elliot Collier (on loan from Chicago Fire) |
| 19 | DF | USA | Louis Bennett II (on loan to Forward Madison) |
| 20 | DF | USA | Todd Pratzner |
| 21 | FW | TTO | Duane Muckette |
| 22 | DF | USA | Wesley Charpie |
| 23 | MF | TTO | Leston Paul |
| 24 | GK | USA | Scott Levene |
| 25 | GK | USA | Jim Barkei |
| 26 | DF | USA | Josh Morton |
| 27 | MF | USA | Cam Lindley (on loan from Orlando City SC) |
| 28 | FW | USA | Jochen Graf |
| 29 | FW | USA | Brandon Allen |
| 30 | MF | USA | Marcus Epps (on loan from New York Red Bulls) |
| 31 | FW | USA | Pierre da Silva |
| 32 | DF | ENG | Liam Doyle |

== Competitions ==
=== Preseason ===
| February 9 | Memphis Tigers | 0–2 | Memphis 901 FC | Memphis, TN |
| | | Report | Gonzalez; Sandoval | Stadium: Billy J. Murphy Track & Soccer Complex |

| February 16 | Christian Brothers Buccaneers | 1–4 | Memphis 901 FC | Memphis, TN |
| 12:00 PM | | Report | Cordovés; Sandoval; Hackworth; Justin Dhillon | Stadium: Signaigo Field |

| February 20 | Louisville City FC | 4–2 | Memphis 901 FC | Nashville, TN |
| 2:00 PM | Spencer 20' (pen.), 33'; Mkosana 67'; Matsoso 88' | Report | Najem 32'; 65' | Stadium: Vanderbilt University |

| February 24 | Saint Louis FC | 3–0 | Memphis 901 FC | Fenton, MO |
| 1:00 PM | Dacres 23', 79'; Greig 27' | Report | | Stadium: Toyota Stadium |

| March 1 | Memphis 901 FC | 5–1 | Memphis Tigers | Memphis, TN |
| 6:00 PM | Cordovés 33'; 39'; Najem 54'; 61'; 66' | Report | 37' | Stadium: AutoZone Park |

=== USL Championship ===
==== Standings ====
| Pos | Team | Pld | W | D | L | GF | GA | GD | Pts |
|---|---|---|---|---|---|---|---|---|---|
| 13 | Charlotte Independence | 34 | 9 | 11 | 14 | 42 | 53 | −11 | 38 |
| 14 | Atlanta United 2 | 34 | 9 | 8 | 17 | 45 | 77 | −32 | 35 |
| 15 | Memphis 901 FC | 34 | 9 | 7 | 18 | 37 | 52 | −15 | 34 |
| 16 | Bethlehem Steel FC | 34 | 8 | 7 | 19 | 49 | 78 | −29 | 31 |
| 17 | Hartford Athletic | 34 | 8 | 5 | 21 | 49 | 80 | −31 | 29 |

Source: USL Championship Standings
Rules for classification: 1) total wins; 2) total goal differential; 3) total goals scored; 4) points earned against top four Conference finishers; 5) disciplinary points; 6) coin toss or drawing of lots

==== Match results ====
The 2019 USL Championship season schedule for the club was announced on December 19, 2018.

Win Draw Loss Upcoming fixture

Unless otherwise noted, all times in Central time

| March 9 1 | Memphis 901 FC | 0–1 | Tampa Bay Rowdies | Memphis, TN |
| 6:00 PM | Metzger (yellow card) 58'; Sandoval (yellow card) 87'; Najem (yellow card) 90+1' | Report | Guenzatti 4' (pen.); Richards (yellow card) 11' | Stadium: AutoZone Park; Attendance: 8,062; Referee: Mike Lavergne |

| March 16 2 | Memphis 901 FC | 1–1 | Loudoun United FC | Memphis, TN |
| 7:00 PM | Collier (yellow card) 76', (goal) 78' | Report | Pilato (yellow card) 25'; Yow 30'; Murphy (yellow card) 87' | Stadium: AutoZone Park; Attendance: 7,250; Referee: Matt Franz |

| March 24 3 | Bethlehem Steel FC | 0–1 | Memphis 901 FC | Bethlehem, PA |
| 5:00 PM | Fontana (yellow card) 28' | Report | Dally 58'; Grandison (yellow card) 78' | Stadium: Goodman Stadium; Attendance: 433; Referee: Luis Arroyo |

| March 29 4 | New York Red Bulls II | 3–2 | Memphis 901 FC | Montclair, NJ |
| 6:00 PM | Stroud 18'; Rito (yellow card) 38'; Barlow 45+1'; Etienne 56'; Scarlett (yellow card) 59' | Report | Najem 11', (yellow card) 45+4'; Burch 61'; Dally (yellow card) 73'; Hodge (yellow card) 90+6' | Stadium: MSU Soccer Park; Attendance: 704; Referee: Matthew Thompson |

| April 6 5 | North Carolina FC | 1–1 | Memphis 901 FC | Cary, NC |
| 6:00 PM | da Luz (red card) 62'; Lomis 78'; Taylor (yellow card) 85' | Report | Burch 64' (pen.) | Stadium: Sahlen's Stadium at WakeMed Soccer Park; Attendance: 3,629; Referee: Guido Gonzales, Jr. |

| April 10 6 | Memphis 901 FC | 0–1 | Atlanta United 2 | Memphis, TN |
| 7:00 PM | Hackworth (yellow card) 44'; Caldwell (yellow card) 70' | Report | Barajas 45'; Vint (yellow card) 64'; Benítez (yellow card) 66'; Castanheira (yellow card) 70' | Stadium: AutoZone Park; Attendance: 7,041; Referee: Alan Kelly |

| April 13 7 | Nashville SC | 2–0 | Memphis 901 FC | Nashville, TN |
| 7:00 PM | LaGrassa 78'; Mensah 81' | Report | Burch (yellow card) 85'; Charpie (yellow card) 89'; Collier (yellow card) 90' | Stadium: Nissan Stadium; Attendance: 6,781; Referee: Carlos Pielago |

| April 27 8 | Memphis 901 FC | 0–1 | Charleston Battery | Memphis, TN |
| 7:00 PM | Lindley (yellow card) 24' | Preview | Candela (yellow card) 26'; Marini 90+3' | Stadium: AutoZone Park; Attendance: 7,871; Referee: Dejan Susak |

| April 30 9 | Louisville City FC | 2–1 | Memphis 901 FC | Louisville, KY |
| 6:30 PM | Craig (yellow card) 5'; Rasmussen 33'; Mkosana 61', (yellow card) 84' | Report | Thiam 71' (o.g.); Burch (yellow card) 84' | Stadium: Louisville Slugger Field; Attendance: 7,816; Referee: Ismir Pekmic |

| May 4 10 | Memphis 901 FC | 2–2 | Birmingham Legion FC | Memphis, TN |
| 3:00 PM | Metzger (yellow card) 27'; Lindley (yellow card) 34', (goal) 40'; Dally (yellow card) 60'; Muckette 86'; Burch (yellow card) 90+3' | Report | Avila (yellow card) 31'; Culbertson (yellow card) 59'; Johnson 84'; Hoffman 90+2' (pen.) | Stadium: AutoZone Park; Attendance: 4,563; Referee: Eric Tattersall |

| May 10 11 | Hartford Athletic | 1–2 | Memphis 901 FC | Hartford, CT |
| 6:00 PM | Lee 31' | Report | Muckette 24'; Metzger (yellow card) 29'; Charpie (yellow card) 36'; Collier 70' | Stadium: Rentschler Field; Attendance: 5,045; Referee: Lukasz Szpala |

| May 18 12 | Memphis 901 FC | Abandoned | Pittsburgh Riverhounds SC | Memphis, TN |
| 7:00 PM | | Report | | Stadium: AutoZone Park |
Note: Match abandoned at halftime due to inclement weather with the score 0-1 (Volesky 26')

| May 22 13 | Swope Park Rangers | 2–2 | Memphis 901 FC | Kansas City, KS |
| 7:00 PM | Riley 34' (pen.); Hernandez (yellow card) 59'; Segbers 68'; Vanacore-Decker (yellow card) 82' | Report | Metzger 3'; Najem (yellow card) 52'; Hodge 73'; Morton (yellow card) 90' | Stadium: Children's Mercy Park; Attendance: 311; Referee: Jon Freemon |

| June 1 14 | Saint Louis FC | Postponed | Memphis 901 FC | Fenton, MO |
| 1:00 PM | | Report | | Stadium: Toyota Stadium; Referee: Matthew Franz |
Note: Match postponed due to severe weather.

| June 8 15 | Memphis 901 FC | 0–3 | Indy Eleven | Memphis, TN |
| 8:30 PM | Charpie (yellow card) 51'; Burch (yellow card) 90+3' | Report | Enevoldsen 31'; Kim 52'; Pasher 58' | Stadium: AutoZone Park; Attendance: 6,829; Referee: Malik Badawi |

| June 15 16 | Ottawa Fury FC | 0–0 | Memphis 901 FC | Ottawa, ON |
| 6:00 PM | Attakora (yellow card) 64' | Report | Charpie (yellow card) 33' | Stadium: TD Place Stadium; Attendance: 4,108; Referee: Serge Topalian |

| June 29 17 | Charlotte Independence | 1–0 | Memphis 901 FC | Matthews, NC |
| 6:00 PM | A.Martinez (yellow card) 67'; Herrera 74' | Report | Charpie (yellow card) 70' | Stadium: Sportsplex at Matthews; Attendance: 1,623; Referee: Elvis Osmanovic |

| July 6 18 | Memphis 901 FC | 4–1 | Hartford Athletic | Memphis, TN |
| 8:30 PM | Collier 6', 11', 75'; Metzger (yellow card) 50'; Burch (yellow card) 57'; Morton (yellow card) 67'; Kunga 80' | Report | Downs (yellow card) 8' de Wit (yellow card) 20'; Jørgenson 30', (yellow card) 90'; Swartz (yellow card) 53'; Dixon (yellow card) 57' | Stadium: AutoZone Park; Attendance: 6,726; Referee: Gabriele Giusti |

| July 13 19 | Charleston Battery | Postponed | Memphis 901 FC | Charleston, SC |
| 7:30 PM | | Report | | Stadium: MUSC Health Stadium; Referee: Danielle Chesky |
Note: Match postponed due to inclement weather

| July 17 20 | Memphis 901 FC | 0–2 | Nashville SC | Memphis, TN |
| 7:30 PM | Morton (yellow card) 62'; Grandison (yellow card) 64'; Lindley (yellow card) 89' | Report | Ockford 42', (yellow card) 60'; Ríos 49'; Doyle (yellow card) 87'; Belmar (yellow card) 89' | Stadium: AutoZone Park; Attendance: 7,828; Referee: Alejandro Mariscal |

| July 20 21 | Memphis 901 FC | 2–2 | New York Red Bulls II | Memphis, TN |
| 7:30 PM | Allen 48', (yellow card) 81', (goal) 87'; Lindley (yellow card) 69'; Kunga (yellow card) 69' | Report | Koffi (yellow card) 7'; Scarlett 10', (yellow card) 89'; Bezecourt 44' | Stadium: AutoZone Park; Attendance: 7,226; Referee: Daniel Gutierrez |

| July 27 22 | Memphis 901 FC | 2–0 | Ottawa Fury FC | Memphis, TN |
| 7:30 PM | Meilleur-Giguère 59' (o.g.); Najem 62'; Paul (yellow card) 90+6' | Report | Oliveira (yellow card) 80'; Haworth (yellow card) 90+4'; Fall (yellow card) 90+6' | Stadium: AutoZone Park; Attendance: 6,614; Referee: Matthew Corrigan |

| August 3 23 | Pittsburgh Riverhounds SC | 4–0 | Memphis 901 FC | Pittsburgh, PA |
| 6:00 PM | Adewole 27'; Mertz 45+2'; Dover 64'; Dos Santos 69'; Volesky (yellow card) 90+1' | Report | Paul (yellow card) 51'; Metzger (yellow card) 76' | Stadium: Highmark Stadium; Referee: Thomas Snyder |

| August 6 14 | Saint Louis FC | 0–0 | Memphis 901 FC | Fenton, MO |
| 7:30 PM | Kamdem (yellow card) 70' | Report | Lindley (red card) 27'; Charpie (yellow card) 75'; Burch (yellow card) 78'; Mohamed (yellow card) 84' | Stadium: Toyota Stadium; Attendance: 5,179; Referee: Jon Freemon |
Note: Replay of June 1 match postponed due to severe weather.

| August 10 24 | Memphis 901 FC | 1–2 | North Carolina FC | Memphis, TN |
| 7:30 PM | Allen 20'; Burch (yellow card) 79' da Silva (yellow card) 81' | Report | Fortune (yellow card) 28'; Ewolo 45+1'; Comsia (yellow card) 56'; Albadawi 88' | Stadium: AutoZone Park; Attendance: 7,006; Referee: Lorant Varga |

| August 17 25 | Birmingham Legion FC | 1–0 | Memphis 901 FC | Birmingham, AL |
| 7:00 PM | Holland (yellow card) 37'; Ward (yellow card) 40'; Avila (yellow card) 68'; Johnson 90', (yellow card) 90+5' | Report | Metzger (yellow card) 5' | Stadium: BBVA Compass Field; Attendance: 5,219; Referee: Matthew Franz |

| August 24 26 | Tampa Bay Rowdies | 5–0 | Memphis 901 FC | St. Petersburg, FL |
| 6:30 PM | Poku 11', 62'; Fernandes (yellow card) 28', (goal) 81'; Tinari 45+5'; Johnson 87' | Report | daSilva (yellow card) 36'; Charpie (yellow card) 47' | Stadium: Al Lang Stadium; Referee: Kevin Broadley |

| August 28 27 | Atlanta United 2 | 1–2 | Memphis 901 FC | Kennesaw, GA |
| 6:30 PM | Metcalf 37' (pen.); Tubbs (yellow card) 71'; Vazquez (yellow card) 81' | Report | Lindley (yellow card) 55'; Najem 79', 83' | Stadium: Fifth Third Bank Stadium; Attendance: 1,231; Referee: Adam Kilpatrick |

| September 2 19 | Charleston Battery | Postponed | Memphis 901 FC | Charleston, SC |
| 5:00 PM | | Report | | Stadium: MUSC Health Stadium; Referee: Danielle Chesky |
Note: Reschedule of match postponed due to inclement weather on July 13 Postponed further due to evacuation order associated with Hurricane Dorian.

| September 7 28 | Memphis 901 FC | 4–2 | Swope Park Rangers | Memphis, TN |
| 7:00 PM | Charpie (yellow card) 34' da Silva 38'; Morton 40'; Metzger (yellow card) 53'; Allen 67', 77'; Burch (yellow card) 70' | Report | Harris 35' (pen.); Segbers (yellow card) 43'; Zé Pedro 50'; Allach (yellow card) 86' | Stadium: Autozone Park; Attendance: 6,036; Referee: Lukasz Szpala |

| September 13 29 | Loudoun United FC | 1–2 | Memphis 901 FC | Leesburg, VA |
| 6:30 PM | Murphy 5'; Martinez (yellow card) 34' (yellow-red card) 58'; Yow (yellow card) 54'; Lubahn (yellow card) 71' | Report | da Silva (yellow card) 52'; Metzger (yellow card) 54'; Hawkins 63' (o.g.); Allen 81' | Stadium: Loudoun United Stadium; Attendance: 1,209; Referee: Jonathan Bilinski |

| September 21 30 | Memphis 901 FC | 1–0 | Saint Louis FC | Memphis, TN |
| 7:00 PM | Epps (yellow card) 43', (goal) 54'; Paul (yellow card) 60'; Allen (yellow card) 75'; Morton (yellow card) 84' | Report | Cicerone (yellow card) 40'; Fernandez (yellow card) 85' | Stadium: Autozone Park; Attendance: 6,701; Referee: Dejan Susak |

| September 24 12 | Memphis 901 FC | 0–1 | Pittsburgh Riverhounds SC | Memphis, TN |
| 7:00 PM | | Report | Greenspan 15'; Mertz (yellow card) 56'; Kerr (yellow card) 90' | Stadium: AutoZone Park; Attendance: 4,142; Referee: Brad Jensen |
Note: Replay of abandoned May 18 match

| September 28 31 | Memphis 901 FC | 5–0 | Bethlehem Steel FC | Memphis, TN |
| 7:00 PM | Collier 7'; Epps 15'; Allen 29', 36'; Doyle 50'; Muckette (yellow card) 83' | Report | Turner (yellow card) 47'; Picazo (yellow card) 76'; Ofeimu (yellow card) 89' | Stadium: Autozone Park; Attendance: 6,078; Referee: Alejandro Mariscal |

| October 5 32 | Indy Eleven | 3–0 | Memphis 901 FC | Indianapolis, IN |
| 7:00 PM | Novoa 13'; Ouimette 22'; Pasher 77' | Report | Doyle (yellow card) 82' | Stadium: Lucas Oil Stadium; Attendance: 13,134; Referee: Elijio Arreguin |

| October 12 33 | Memphis 901 FC | 1–2 | Charlotte Independence | Memphis, TN |
| 7:00 PM | Grandison (yellow card) 59'; Allen 73' (pen.), (red card) 75'; Doyle (yellow card) 79' da Silva (yellow card) 88' (yellow-red card) 90+6'; Burch (yellow card) 90+4' | Report | Herrera 39'; Jackson (yellow card) 62', (goal) 77'; Roberts (yellow card) 75'; Miller (yellow card) 75' | Stadium: AutoZone Park; Attendance: 5,780; Referee: John Griggs |

| October 16 19 | Charleston Battery | 2–0 | Memphis 901 FC | Charleston, SC |
| 7:00 PM | Mueller 30'; Lewis (yellow card) 55', (goal) 63'; Kelly-Rosales (yellow card) 90+1' | Report | Burch (yellow card) 48'; Metzger (yellow card) 68'; Collier (yellow card) 81'; Mohamed (yellow card) 86' | Stadium: MUSC Health Stadium; Attendance: 2,206; Referee: Elvis Osmanovic |

| October 19 34 | Memphis 901 FC | 1–2 | Louisville City FC | Memphis, TN |
| 7:00 PM | Epps 9' | Report | Williams 37', (yellow card) 87'; Rasmussen (yellow card) 42'; Hoppenot 78' | Stadium: AutoZone Park; Attendance: 6,845; Referee: Lorant Varga |

=== U.S. Open Cup ===
As a member of the USL Championship, Memphis 901 FC entered the tournament in the Second Round, played May 14–15, 2019

| May 15 Second Round | Memphis 901 FC (Tennessee) | 3–1 | (New York (state)) New York Red Bulls U-23 | Memphis, TN |
| 7:00 pm CDT | Lindley 8'; Morton 26', 73'; Grandison (yellow card) 31'; Bennett II (yellow card) 90+4' | Report | Marin 5'; Sharifi (yellow card) 49'; Uche (yellow card) 90+4' | Stadium: AutoZone Park; Attendance: 4,057; Referee: Carlos Pielago |

| May 29 Third Round | Memphis 901 FC (Tennessee) | 4–0 | (Connecticut) Hartford Athletic | Memphis, TN |
| 7:00 pm CDT | Burch 6' (pen.); Graf 21', 59'; Lindley (yellow card) 45'; Hackworth 83' | Report | Curinga (yellow card) 19' de Wit (yellow card) 39' (yellow-red card) 61' | Stadium: Mike Rose Soccer Complex; Attendance: 1,819; Referee: Leland Grant |

| June 12 Fourth round | Memphis 901 FC (Tennessee) | 1–3 | (Florida) Orlando City SC | Memphis, TN |
| 7:30 pm CDT | Collier 50'; Burch (yellow card) 60' | Report | Kljestan 38' (pen.), 55'; Jansson 71' | Stadium: Mike Rose Soccer Complex; Attendance: 3,088; Referee: Sergii Demianchuk |
