= 2018 Pittsburgh Riverhounds SC season =

Pittsburgh Riverhounds SC
2018 season
- Owner: Terry "Tuffy" Shallenberger
- Head coach: Bob Lilley
- United Soccer League: Eastern Conference: 3rd
- USL Playoffs: Conference Quarterfinals (knocked out by Bethlehem Steel FC)
- U.S. Open Cup: Third round (knocked out by FC Cincinnati)
- Top goalscorer: League: Neco Brett (15); All: Neco Brett (15)
- Highest home attendance: 3,811 (July 4 vs. North Carolina)
- Lowest home attendance: 840 (April 7 vs. Toronto)
- Average home league attendance: 2,401
Home colors	Away colors	Third colors

The 2018 Pittsburgh Riverhounds SC season was the club's nineteenth season of existence, and their eighth consecutive season in the United Soccer League, the second tier of American soccer. Pittsburgh also competed in the U.S. Open Cup. The season covered the period from October 15, 2017, to the beginning of the 2019 USL season.

Bob Lilley took charge of his first season as Riverhounds manager, jumping over from Rochester Rhinos after that club went on hiatus. In his 20th season as a professional manager, Lilley continued a personal record of his teams never failing to qualify for their respective playoffs.

Pittsburgh finished in third place in the Eastern Conference, the club's best regular season performance since 2010, and qualified for the playoffs for the first time in three years. The Riverhounds were eliminated in the conference quarterfinals by Bethlehem Steel FC, who prevailed after an eight-round penalty shootout. Pittsburgh won a game in the U.S. Open Cup for the first time in three years, prevailing against Erie Commodores in the second round. However, the club was knocked out in the third round by fellow USL side FC Cincinnati.

== Roster ==
As of match played October 20, 2018

No.	Name	Nationality	Position(s)	Date of birth (age)	Signed in	Previous club	Apps	Goals
Goalkeepers
1	Kyle Morton	(United States)	GK	March 31, 1994 (age 32)	2018	(United States) Rochester Rhinos	3	0
22	Mike Kirk	(United States)	GK	February 12, 1994 (age 32)	2018	(United States) Rio Grande Valley FC Toros	8	0
29	Nathan Ingham	(Canada)	GK	June 27, 1993 (age 33)	2018	(Canada) Calgary Foothills	0	0
33	Daniel Lynd	(United States)	GK	March 4, 1994 (age 32)	2018	(United States) Rochester Rhinos	27	0
Defenders
2	Tobi Adewole	(United States)	DF	October 14, 1995 (age 30)	2017	(United States) George Washington Colonials	41	1
3	Raymond Lee	(United States)	DF	April 26, 1993 (age 33)	2018	(United States) Rochester Rhinos	31	0
5	Jordan Dover	(Canada)	DF	December 14, 1994 (age 31)	2018	(United States) Rochester Rhinos	33	2
6	Hugh Roberts	(United States)	DF	September 27, 1992 (age 34)	2018	(United States) Bethlehem Steel FC	29	2
16	Andrew Lubahn	(United States)	DF	September 10, 1991 (age 35)	2018	(United States) San Francisco Deltas	20	1
20	Joseph Greenspan	(United States)	DF	September 12, 1992 (age 34)	2018	(United States) Minnesota United FC	34	3
23	Todd Pratzner	(United States)	DF	August 10, 1994 (age 32)	2018	(United States) Rochester Rhinos	18	0
Midfielders
4	Joe Holland	(England)	MF	April 20, 1993 (age 33)	2018	(United States) Houston Dynamo	17	0
7	Christiano François	(Haiti)	MF	July 17, 1993 (age 33)	2018	(United States) Rochester Rhinos	35	4
8	Bakie Goodman	(United States)	MF	February 28, 1995 (age 31)	2018	(United States) Detroit City	3	0
10	Kevin Kerr	(Scotland)	MF	January 12, 1989 (age 37)	2013	(Germany) SC Wiedenbrück	167	27
11	Kenardo Forbes	(Jamaica)	MF	May 15, 1988 (age 38)	2018	(United States) Rochester Rhinos	35	4
13	Ben Zemanski	(United States)	MF	May 12, 1988 (age 38)	2018	(United States) Portland Timbers	25	3
14	Noah Franke	(United States)	MF	March 25, 1995 (age 31)	2018	(United States) Creighton Bluejays	10	0
21	Mouhamed Dabo	(Senegal)	MF	January 2, 1996 (age 30)	2018	(United States) Harrisburg City Islanders	25	1
25	Thomas Vancaeyezeele	(France)	MF	July 27, 1994 (age 32)	2018	(United States) Charleston Golden Eagles	35	3
44	Ben Fitzpatrick	(United States)	MF	December 15, 1994 (age 31)	2017	(United States) Ohio State Buckeyes	13	1
Forwards
9	Neco Brett	(Jamaica)	FW	March 22, 1992 (age 34)	2018	(United States) Portland Timbers 2	36	15
15	Dennis Chin	(Jamaica)	FW	June 4, 1987 (age 39)	2018	(Israel) Ironi Nesher	6	1
17	Kay Banjo	(United States)	FW	December 3, 1992 (age 33)	2017	(United States) UMBC Retrievers	34	4
27	Romeo Parkes	(Jamaica)	FW	November 11, 1990 (age 35)	2017	(El Salvador) Isidro Metapán	58	13

== Preseason ==
The Riverhounds released their preseason schedule on January 29, 2018. The club played nine games in just over a month, seven coming against collegiate programs and two against fellow USL teams. All nine games were played in the state of Pennsylvania, seven at home and two on the road.

February 10 Friendly	Pittsburgh Riverhounds SC	4–2	Spring Arbor Cougars	Pittsburgh, PA
3:00 PM EST	Holland 5'; Goodman 45'; Brett 58' (pen.); Fitzpatrick 72'	Report	60'; 74'	Stadium: Highmark Stadium

February 11 Friendly	Pittsburgh Riverhounds SC	3–0	Cleveland State Vikings	Pittsburgh, PA
2:00 PM EST	Parkes 35' (pen.); Milne 65'; Brett 90'	Report		Stadium: Highmark Stadium

February 18 Friendly	Pittsburgh Riverhounds SC	1–0	St. Bonaventure Bonnies	Pittsburgh, PA
2:00 PM EST	François 72' (pen.)	Report		Stadium: Highmark Stadium

February 23 Friendly	Pittsburgh Riverhounds SC	2–0	Charleston Golden Eagles	Pittsburgh, PA
7:30 PM EST	Kerr 21'; Dabo 59'	Report		Stadium: Highmark Stadium

February 25 Friendly	Pittsburgh Riverhounds SC	4–2	Akron Zips	Pittsburgh, PA
2:00 PM EST	Kerr 37'; R. Parkes 40'; Chin 62'; Holland 88'	Report	32'; 42'	Stadium: Highmark Stadium

March 2 Friendly	Pittsburgh Panthers	0–1	Pittsburgh Riverhounds SC	Pittsburgh, PA
7:00 PM EST		Report	Brett 44'	Stadium: Ambrose Urbanic Field

March 4 Friendly	Bethlehem Steel FC	0–2	Pittsburgh Riverhounds SC	Chester, PA
3:00 PM EST		Report	Kerr 5'; Pratzner (yellow card) 73'; Dover 90'	Stadium: Power Training Complex

March 10 Friendly	Pittsburgh Riverhounds SC	3–2	Penn FC	Pittsburgh, PA
3:00 PM EST	Kerr 11' (pen.); Dabo (yellow card) 23'; Holland 52' (pen.); Vancaeyezeele (yellow card) 61'; Parkes 68'	Report	Rivera 24'; Metzger 90+' (pen.)	Stadium: Highmark Stadium

March 17 Friendly	Pittsburgh Riverhounds SC	0–1	Villanova Wildcats	Pittsburgh, PA
1:30 PM EDT		Report	82' (pen.)	Stadium: Highmark Stadium

== Competitions ==
=== USL ===
==== Standings ====
Pos	Team	Pld	W	D	L	GF	GA	GD	Pts	Qualification
1	FC Cincinnati (X)	34	23	8	3	72	34	+38	77	Conference Playoffs
2	Louisville City FC (C)	34	19	9	6	71	38	+33	66	Conference Playoffs
3	Pittsburgh Riverhounds SC	34	15	14	5	47	26	+21	59	Conference Playoffs
4	Charleston Battery	34	14	14	6	47	34	+13	56	Conference Playoffs
5	New York Red Bulls II	34	13	13	8	71	59	+12	52	Conference Playoffs

Source: 2018 USL standings
Rules for classification: 1) total wins; 2) total goal differential; 3) total goals scored; 4) points earned against top four Conference finishers; 5) disciplinary points; 6) coin toss or drawing of lots
(C) Champions; (X) Regular Season League Champion

==== Results summary ====
Overall								Home						Away					
Pld	W	D	L	GF	GA	GD	Pts	W	D	L	GF	GA	GD	W	D	L	GF	GA	GD
34	15	14	5	47	26	+21	59	9	7	2	25	8	+17	6	7	3	22	18	+4

Source: USL standings

==== Results by round ====
Round	1	2	3	4	5	6	7	8	9	10	11	12	13	14	15	16	17	18	19	20	21	22	23	24	25	26	27	28	29	30	31	32	33	34
Stadium	A	H	H	H	A	H	A	H	A	H	H	A	H	A	A	H	A	H	A	H	H	A	H	H	A	A	H	H	H	A	A	H	A	A
Result	D	D	W	W	D	W	W	D	D	D	L	W	W	D	W	W	W	L	L	W	W	W	D	D	D	L	W	D	W	W	D	D	D	L

Source: Pittsburgh schedule
A = Away; H = Home; W = Win; D = Draw; L = Loss

==== Match results ====
In August 2017, the USL announced that the 2018 season would span 34 games, the longest regular season the league had ever run. The augmented schedule was spurred by the addition of six new clubs for the 2018 season: Atlanta United 2, Fresno FC, Indy Eleven, Las Vegas Lights, Nashville SC, and North Carolina FC.

On January 12, 2018, the league announced home openers for every club. Pittsburgh began the season on the road against expansion club Nashville SC, taking part in the first match in that club's history. The Riverhounds then played their home opener against Penn FC, the first time since 2015 that Pittsburgh opened its home slate with a Keystone Derby Cup match.

The schedule for the remainder of the 2018 season was released on January 19, 2018. Pittsburgh played three times against four different clubs: Penn FC, FC Cincinnati, Indy Eleven, and Toronto FC II. They played every other Eastern Conference team twice.

March 24 1	Nashville SC	0–0	Pittsburgh Riverhounds SC	Nashville, TN
5:00 PM EDT	Moloto (yellow card) 52'; Mensah (yellow card) 68'	Report	Vancaeyezeele (yellow card) 18'	Stadium: Nissan Stadium; Attendance: 18,922; Referee: Leland Grant

March 31 2	Pittsburgh Riverhounds SC	0–0	Penn FC	Pittsburgh, PA
7:00 PM EDT	François (yellow card) 38'	Report	Barone (yellow card) 45'; Peiser (yellow card) 90+1'	Stadium: Highmark Stadium; Attendance: 2,006; Referee: Charles Murphy

April 7 3	Pittsburgh Riverhounds SC	4–0	Toronto FC II	Pittsburgh, PA
3:00 PM EDT	Brett 52', 59', 83'; Dabo (yellow card) 81'; Vancaeyezeele (yellow card) 86'; François 88'	Report	Andrews (yellow card) 47'	Stadium: Highmark Stadium; Attendance: 840; Referee: Austin Saini
Note: Originally scheduled to be played at BMO Field in Toronto.

April 14 4	Pittsburgh Riverhounds SC	1–0	Ottawa Fury FC	Pittsburgh, PA
7:00 PM EDT	Zemanski (yellow card) 75'; Adewole 85'; Pratzner (yellow card) 90+1'	Report	Bruna (yellow card) 57'; Portilla (yellow card) 75'; Edward (yellow card) 90+3'	Stadium: Highmark Stadium; Attendance: 1,823; Referee: Lorant Varga

April 21 5	FC Cincinnati	2–2	Pittsburgh Riverhounds SC	Cincinnati, OH
7:00 PM EDT	König 59'; Ledesma (yellow card) 68'; Walker 78'; Keinan (yellow card) 88'; Laing (yellow card) 90+1'	Report	Dover 6', (yellow card) 35'; Vancaeyezeele 73'	Stadium: Nippert Stadium; Attendance: 24,505; Referee: Greg Dopka

April 28 6	Pittsburgh Riverhounds SC	1–0	Atlanta United 2	Pittsburgh, PA
7:00 PM EDT	Brett 26'; François (yellow card) 61'	Report	Robinson (yellow card) 75', (yellow card) 82' (red card); Metcalf (yellow card) 84'	Stadium: Highmark Stadium; Attendance: 1,998; Referee: Kevin Broadley

May 5 7	Toronto FC II	1–2	Pittsburgh Riverhounds SC	Rochester, NY
6:00 PM EDT	Hundal 90+1'	Report	Brett 12'; Kerr 36'	Stadium: Marina Auto Stadium; Attendance: 1,074; Referee: Elvis Osmanovic

May 11 8	Pittsburgh Riverhounds SC	0–0	Indy Eleven	Pittsburgh, PA
7:00 PM EDT		Report	Ring (yellow card) 77'	Stadium: Highmark Stadium; Attendance: 3,123; Referee: Eric Tattersall

May 19 9	Tampa Bay Rowdies	2–2	Pittsburgh Riverhounds SC	St. Petersburg, FL
7:30 PM EDT	Rozeboom 3'; Hristov (yellow card) 57'; Cole 59'; Lachowecki (yellow card) 90+1'	Report	Kerr (yellow card) 17'; Lachowecki 20' (o.g.); Parkes 30'; Pratzner (yellow card) 49'	Stadium: Al Lang Stadium; Attendance: 6,202; Referee: David Barrie

May 26 10	Pittsburgh Riverhounds SC	0–0	Penn FC	Pittsburgh, PA
7:00 PM EDT	Parkes (yellow card) 21'; Brett (yellow card) 90+4'	Report	Metzger (yellow card) 48'	Stadium: Highmark Stadium; Attendance: 2,110; Referee: Ismir Pekmic

May 30 11	Pittsburgh Riverhounds SC	0–1	Nashville SC	Pittsburgh, PA
7:00 PM EDT	Lee (yellow card) 61'	Report	Washington (yellow card) 44'; LaGrassa (yellow card) 58'; Allen 69'	Stadium: Highmark Stadium; Attendance: 967; Referee: Marcos de Oliveira

June 2 12	Richmond Kickers	1–2	Pittsburgh Riverhounds SC	Richmond, VA
7:00 PM EDT	Williams (yellow card) 21'; Fernando 53'; Sekyere (yellow card) 85'; Umar (red card) 86'	Report	Lee (yellow card) 9'; Dover (yellow card) 41'; Brett 72'; Kerr (yellow card) 75'; Parkes 79'	Stadium: City Stadium; Attendance: 2,451; Referee: Lukasz Szpala

June 16 13	Pittsburgh Riverhounds SC	3–0	New York Red Bulls II	Pittsburgh, PA
7:00 PM EDT	Brett 27', 54'; Dover (yellow card) 32'; Vancaeyezeele (yellow card) 34'; Parkes 65'	Report	Barlow (yellow card) 77'	Stadium: Highmark Stadium; Attendance: 3,652; Referee: Greg Dopka

June 23 14	Charleston Battery	0–0	Pittsburgh Riverhounds SC	Charleston, SC
7:00 PM EDT		Report	Roberts (yellow card) 74'; Greenspan (yellow card) 82'	Stadium: MUSC Health Stadium; Attendance: 2,862; Referee: Daniel Gutierrez

June 27 15	Louisville City	0–1	Pittsburgh Riverhounds SC	Louisville, KY
3:00 PM EDT	Craig (yellow card) 85'	Report	Dabo (yellow card) 75'; Forbes 79'	Stadium: Louisville Slugger Field; Attendance: 7,126; Referee: Rubiel Vazquez

July 4 16	Pittsburgh Riverhounds SC	2–0	North Carolina FC	Pittsburgh, PA
7:00 PM EDT	François 45'; Kerr 71'; Lubahn (yellow card) 84'	Report	Fortune (yellow card) 76'; Blanco (yellow card) 89'	Stadium: Highmark Stadium; Attendance: 3,811; Referee: Jon Freemon

July 8 17	Ottawa Fury FC	0–1	Pittsburgh Riverhounds SC	Ottawa, ON
1:00 PM EDT		Report	Roberts 22'	Stadium: TD Place Stadium; Attendance: 4,826; Referee: Yusri Rudolf

July 21 18	Pittsburgh Riverhounds SC	0–1	Charleston Battery	Pittsburgh, PA
7:00 PM EDT	Vancaeyezeele (yellow card) 90'	Report	Guerra (yellow card) 83', (goal) 88'	Stadium: Highmark Stadium; Attendance: 3,371; Referee: Eric Tattersall

July 28 19	North Carolina FC	2–1	Pittsburgh Riverhounds SC	Cary, NC
7:00 PM EDT	Ríos 24'; Guillen (yellow card) 42'; Fernandes 90+1'	Report	François 57'	Stadium: WakeMed Soccer Park; Attendance: 3,896; Referee: Lorant Varga

August 1 20	Pittsburgh Riverhounds SC	3–0	Richmond Kickers	Pittsburgh, PA
7:00 PM EDT	Brett 5', 69'; Zemanski (yellow card) 42'; Lubahn (yellow card) 49'; Pratzner (yellow card) 58'; Fitzpatrick 81'	Report	Bolduc (yellow card) 62'; Williams (yellow card) 84'	Stadium: Highmark Stadium; Attendance: 2,138; Referee: Charles Murphy

August 4 21	Pittsburgh Riverhounds SC	1–0	Toronto FC II	Pittsburgh, PA
7:00 PM EDT	Kerr (yellow card) 20'; Vancaeyezeele (yellow card) 80'; Brett 81'; Greenspan (yellow card) 90+4'	Report	Uccello (yellow card) 73'; Srbely (yellow card) 84'	Stadium: Highmark Stadium; Attendance: 3,125; Referee: Darth Newman

August 12 22	Bethlehem Steel FC	1–2	Pittsburgh Riverhounds SC	Bethlehem, PA
5:00 PM EDT	Mahoney (yellow card) 20'; Nanco 52'; Moar (yellow card) 70'; Real (yellow card) 81'	Report	Adewole (yellow card) 26'; Brett 35', 79'; Dover (yellow card) 62'	Stadium: Goodman Stadium; Attendance: 2,752; Referee: Guido Gonzalez, Jr.

August 18 23	Pittsburgh Riverhounds SC	0–0	Charlotte Independence	Pittsburgh, PA
7:00 PM EDT		Report	Jordan (yellow card) 10', (yellow card) 58' (red card)	Stadium: Highmark Stadium; Attendance: 2,765; Referee: Elvis Osmanovic

August 22 24	Pittsburgh Riverhounds SC	1–1	Tampa Bay Rowdies	Pittsburgh, PA
7:00 PM EDT	Dabo 45+1'; Vancaeyezeele (yellow card) 62'	Report	Flemmings 72'; Vega (yellow card) 90+3'	Stadium: Highmark Stadium; Attendance: 1,910; Referee: Marcos de Oliveira

August 29 25	Indy Eleven	2–2	Pittsburgh Riverhounds SC	Indianapolis, IN
7:00 PM EDT	McInerney 4', 90+4', (yellow card) 90+5'	Report	Greenspan 45+2'; François 59'; Lee (red card) 86'	Stadium: Lucas Oil Stadium; Attendance: 8,077; Referee: Malik Badawi

September 1 26	FC Cincinnati	2–1	Pittsburgh Riverhounds SC	Cincinnati, OH
7:30 PM EDT	Lasso (yellow card) 38'; Keinan 80'; Adi (yellow card) 88', (goal) 88'	Report	Parkes 57'	Stadium: Nippert Stadium; Attendance: 25,735; Referee: Joseph Dickerson

September 7 27	Pittsburgh Riverhounds SC	4–1	Bethlehem Steel FC	Pittsburgh, PA
7:00 PM EDT	Greenspan 17'; Forbes 45'; Dabo (yellow card) 56'; Brett 76'; Dover 79'	Report	Chambers 35' (pen.); Aubrey (yellow card) 90'	Stadium: Highmark Stadium; Attendance: 1,356; Referee: Daniel Gutierrez

September 15 28	Pittsburgh Riverhounds SC	2–2	Louisville City	Pittsburgh, PA
7:00 PM EDT	Greenspan (yellow card) 69'; Ranjitsingh 86' (o.g.); Forbes 90+1' (pen.)	Report	Lancaster 31', (yellow card) 55'; Souahy 70'; Smith (yellow card) 90+4'	Stadium: Highmark Stadium; Attendance: 2,558; Referee: Farhad Dadkho

September 22 29	Pittsburgh Riverhounds SC	3–2	Indy Eleven	Pittsburgh, PA
7:00 PM EDT	Zemanski 49'; Brett 51'; Forbes 90' (pen.)	Report	McInerney 81'; Greenspan 90+2' (o.g.); Venegas (yellow card) 90+4'	Stadium: Highmark Stadium; Attendance: 2,454; Referee: Kevin Broadley

September 26 30	Penn FC	0–2	Pittsburgh Riverhounds SC	Harrisburg, PA
6:30 PM EDT	Jaime (yellow card) 66'; Franco (yellow card) 84'	Report	Banjo 38'; Roberts (yellow card) 78'; Lubahn 90+3'	Stadium: FNB Field; Attendance: 1,938; Referee: JJ Bilinski

September 29 31	Charlotte Independence	2–2	Pittsburgh Riverhounds SC	Matthews, NC
7:00 PM EDT	Herrera 19'; Johnson (yellow card) 46'; Watson (yellow card) 77'; Zayed 86'; Duckett (yellow card) 90+2'	Report	Parkes 4', (yellow card) 44'; Zemanski 90+4'	Stadium: Sportsplex at Matthews; Attendance: 1,878; Referee: Mark Allatin

October 6 32	Pittsburgh Riverhounds SC	0–0	FC Cincinnati	Pittsburgh, PA
7:00 PM EDT		Report	Lasso (yellow card) 35'	Stadium: Highmark Stadium; Attendance: 3,205; Referee: Eric Tattersall

October 10 33	Atlanta United 2	1–1	Pittsburgh Riverhounds SC	Lawrenceville, GA
7:00 PM EDT	Kissiedou 52'	Report	Vancaeyezeele 27'; Roberts (yellow card) 43'; Lubahn (yellow card) 73'	Stadium: Coolray Field; Attendance: 1,319; Referee: Guido Gonzalez Jr.

October 14 34	New York Red Bulls II	2–1	Pittsburgh Riverhounds SC	Montclair, NJ
5:00 PM EDT	Barlow 30'; Stroud 90+1'	Report	Greenspan 90+5'	Stadium: MSU Soccer Park; Attendance: 1,592; Referee: Matt Franz

=== Postseason ===
October 20 Quarterfinal	Pittsburgh Riverhounds SC	2–2 (a.e.t.) (7–8 p)	Bethlehem Steel FC	Pittsburgh, PA
7:00 PM EDT	Zemanski 25'; Dover (yellow card) 86'; Roberts 105', (yellow card) 109'; Forbes (yellow card) 113'; Holland (red card) 119'	Report	Faris (yellow card) 45'; Ngalina 70'; Chambers 109'; Nanco (yellow card) 111'	Stadium: Highmark Stadium; Attendance: 5,189; Referee: Michael Radchuk
	Penalties
	Kerr (penalty scored); Forbes (penalty scored); Banjo (penalty scored); Greenspan (penalty scored); François (penalty scored); Vancaeyezeele (penalty scored); Dabo (penalty scored); Lee (penalty missed)		(penalty scored) Chambers; (penalty scored) Nanco; (penalty scored) Holness; (penalty scored) Moar; (penalty scored) Skundrich; (penalty scored) Mahoney; (penalty scored) Real; (penalty scored) Mbaizo

=== U.S. Open Cup ===
May 16 Second round	Erie Commodores	1–2	Pittsburgh Riverhounds SC	Erie, PA
7:00 PM EDT	Philpot 45'; Bennett (yellow card) 70'	Report	Vancaeyezeele 4'; Kerr 30' (pen.); Lubahn (yellow card) 76'	Stadium: McConnell Family Stadium; Attendance: 451; Referee: James Duling

May 23 Third round	Pittsburgh Riverhounds SC	1–3	FC Cincinnati	Pittsburgh, PA
7:00 PM EDT	Lubahn (yellow card) 78'; Chin 88'	Report	McLaughlin 39'; Laing 61', (yellow card) 68'; Haber 62'	Stadium: Highmark Stadium; Attendance: 1,500; Referee: Kevin Fikar

== Statistics ==
=== Appearances and goals ===
Kevin Kerr entered the season among the top 10 in club history for both appearances and goals. He was third in appearances, needing to play 17 times this season to pass Gary DePalma for second all-time. He was also tied with José Angulo for sixth all-time in goals, and needed three to pass Phil Karn for fifth place in the club's history. On July 4, Kerr hit both of those marks, with the Riverhounds' victory over North Carolina FC marking his seventeenth appearance and third goal in all competitions on the year.

No.	Pos.	Name	USL		USL Playoffs		U.S. Open Cup		Total	
No.	Pos.	Name	Apps	Goals	Apps	Goals	Apps	Goals	Apps	Goals
1	GK	(United States) Kyle Morton	3	0	0	0	0	0	3	0
2	DF	(United States) Tobi Adewole	24	1	0	0	2	0	26	1
3	DF	(United States) Raymond Lee	28	0	1	0	2	0	31	0
4	MF	(United States) Joe Holland	14	0	1	0	2	0	17	0
5	DF	(Canada) Jordan Dover	30	2	1	0	2	0	33	2
6	DF	(United States) Hugh Roberts	26	1	1	1	2	0	29	2
7	MF	(Haiti) Christiano François	32	4	1	0	2	0	35	4
8	MF	(United States) Bakie Goodman	2	0	0	0	1	0	3	0
9	FW	(Jamaica) Neco Brett	33	15	1	0	2	0	36	15
10	MF	(Scotland) Kevin Kerr	20	2	1	0	1	1	22	3
11	MF	(Jamaica) Kenardo Forbes	33	4	1	0	1	0	35	4
13	MF	(United States) Ben Zemanski	24	2	1	1	0	0	25	3
14	MF	(United States) Noah Franke	8	0	0	0	2	0	10	0
15	FW	(Jamaica) Dennis Chin	5	0	0	0	1	1	6	1
16	DF	(United States) Andrew Lubahn	18	1	0	0	2	0	20	1
17	FW	(United States) Kay Banjo	13	1	1	0	0	0	14	1
20	DF	(United States) Joseph Greenspan	23	3	1	0	0	0	24	3
21	MF	(Senegal) Mouhamed Dabo	24	1	1	0	0	0	25	1
22	GK	(United States) Mike Kirk	7	0	0	0	1	0	8	0
23	DF	(United States) Todd Pratzner	17	0	0	0	1	0	18	0
25	MF	(France) Thomas Vancaeyezeele	33	2	1	0	1	1	35	3
27	FW	(Jamaica) Romeo Parkes	25	5	1	0	1	0	27	5
29	GK	(Canada) Nathan Ingham	0	0	0	0	0	0	0	0
33	GK	(United States) Daniel Lynd	25	0	1	0	1	0	27	0
44	MF	(United States) Ben Fitzpatrick	3	1	0	0	0	0	3	1
Players who left the club during the season:
12	DF	(United States) Connor Maloney	2	0	0	0	0	0	2	0

Source: Pittsburgh stats

=== Disciplinary record ===
No.	Pos.	Name	USL		USL Playoffs		U.S. Open Cup		Total	
No.	Pos.	Name	Booked	Sent off (straight red)	Booked	Sent off (straight red)	Booked	Sent off (straight red)	Booked	Sent off (straight red)
2	DF	(United States) Tobi Adewole	1	0	0	0	0	0	1	0
3	DF	(United States) Raymond Lee	2	1	0	0	0	0	2	1
4	MF	(England) Joe Holland	0	0	0	1	0	0	0	1
5	DF	(Canada) Jordan Dover	4	0	1	0	0	0	5	0
6	DF	(United States) Hugh Roberts	3	0	1	0	0	0	4	0
7	MF	(Haiti) Christiano François	2	0	0	0	0	0	2	0
9	FW	(Jamaica) Neco Brett	1	0	0	0	0	0	1	0
10	MF	(Scotland) Kevin Kerr	3	0	0	0	0	0	3	0
11	MF	(Jamaica) Kenardo Forbes	0	0	1	0	0	0	1	0
13	MF	(United States) Ben Zemanski	2	0	0	0	0	0	2	0
16	DF	(United States) Andrew Lubahn	3	0	0	0	2	0	5	0
20	DF	(United States) Joseph Greenspan	3	0	0	0	0	0	3	0
21	MF	(Senegal) Mouhamed Dabo	3	0	0	0	0	0	3	0
23	MF	(United States) Todd Pratzner	3	0	0	0	0	0	3	0
25	MF	(France) Thomas Vancaeyezeele	6	0	0	0	0	0	6	0
27	FW	(Jamaica) Romeo Parkes	2	0	0	0	0	0	2	0

Source: Pittsburgh stats

=== Clean sheets ===
No.	Name	USL	USL Playoffs	U.S. Open Cup	Total	Games Played		
No.	Name	1	(United States) Kyle Morton	3	0	0	3	3
22	(United States) Mike Kirk	2	0	0	2	8		
29	(Canada) Nathan Ingham	0	0	0	0	0		
33	(United States) Daniel Lynd	12	0	0	12	27		

Source: Pittsburgh stats

== Transfers ==
=== In ===
Pos.	Player	Transferred from	Fee/notes	Date	Source
MF	(Haiti) Christiano François	(United States) Rochester Rhinos	One-year contract with a club option for 2019.	December 15, 2017	
DF	(United States) Raymond Lee	(United States) Rochester Rhinos	One-year contract with a club option for 2019.	December 15, 2017	
DF	(Canada) Jordan Dover	(United States) Rochester Rhinos	One-year contract with a club option for 2019.	December 19, 2017	
GK	(United States) Daniel Lynd	(United States) Rochester Rhinos	One-year contract with a club option for 2019.	December 19, 2017	
MF	(Jamaica) Kenardo Forbes	(United States) Rochester Rhinos	One-year contract with a club option for 2019.	December 21, 2017	
DF	(United States) Joseph Greenspan	(United States) Minnesota United FC	One-year contract with a club option for 2019.	January 12, 2018	
GK	(United States) Mike Kirk	(United States) Rio Grande Valley FC	One-year contract with a club option for 2019.	January 26, 2018	
GK	(United States) Kyle Morton	(United States) Rochester Rhinos	One-year contract with a club option for 2019.	January 26, 2018	
FW	(Jamaica) Dennis Chin	(Israel) Ironi Nesher	One-year contract with a club option for 2019.	February 23, 2018	
FW	(Jamaica) Neco Brett	(United States) Portland Timbers 2	One-year contract with a club option for 2019.	February 27, 2018	
MF	(Senegal) Mouhamed Dabo	(United States) Harrisburg City Islanders	One-year contract with a club option for 2019.	February 27, 2018	
MF	(United States) Bakie Goodman	(United States) Detroit City	One-year contract with a club option for 2019.	February 27, 2018	
MF	(England) Joe Holland	(United States) Houston Dynamo	One-year contract with a club option for 2019.	February 27, 2018	
MF	(United States) Ben Zemanski	(United States) Portland Timbers	One-year contract with a club option for 2019.	March 5, 2018	
DF	(United States) Todd Pratzner	(United States) Rochester Rhinos	One-year contract with a club option for 2019.	March 7, 2018	
DF	(United States) Hugh Roberts	(United States) Bethlehem Steel FC	One-year contract with a club option for 2019.	March 7, 2018	
MF	(France) Thomas Vancaeyezeele	(United States) Charleston Golden Eagles	One-year contract with a club option for 2019.	March 14, 2018	
DF	(United States) Andrew Lubahn	(United States) San Francisco Deltas	One-year contract with a club option for 2019.	March 22, 2018	
MF	(United States) Noah Franke	(United States) Creighton Bluejays	One-year contract with a club option for 2019.	March 28, 2018	
GK	(Canada) Nathan Ingham	(Canada) Calgary Foothills	Signed for the remainder of the 2018 season with a club option for 2019.	July 25, 2018	

=== Loan in ===
Pos.	Player	Parent club	Length/Notes	Beginning	End	Source
DF	(United States) Connor Maloney	(United States) Columbus Crew SC	On a match-by-match basis.	May 25, 2018	June 30, 2018	

=== Out ===
Pos.	Player	Transferred to	Fee/notes	Date	Source
DF	(United States) Ryan Adeleye	(United States) Atlantic City FC	Contract expired. Signed for Atlantic City on March 5, 2018.	November 30, 2017	
DF	(United States) Gale Agbossoumonde		Contract expired.	November 30, 2017	
GK	(United States) Brenden Alfery		Contract expired. Retired.	November 30, 2017	
DF	(United States) Rich Balchan	(United States) Atlantic City FC	Contract expired. Signed for Atlantic City on March 2, 2018.	November 30, 2017	
GK	(Barbados) Keasel Broome		Contract option declined.	November 30, 2017	
DF	(United States) Shane Campbell	(United States) Lansdowne Bhoys	Contract option declined. Signed for Lansdowne on March 19, 2018.	November 30, 2017	
DF	(United States) Ritchie Duffie	(United States) Lionsbridge FC	Contract option declined. Signed for Lionsbridge in 2018.	November 30, 2017	
MF	(Republic of Ireland) Danny Earls		Contract expired.	November 30, 2017	
MF	(United States) Michael Green		Contract option declined.	November 30, 2017	
FW	(United States) Corey Hertzog	(United States) Saint Louis FC	Contract expired. Signed for Saint Louis on December 11, 2017.	November 30, 2017	
MF	(Jamaica) Kenroy Howell	(United States) Grand Rapids FC	Contract option declined. Signed for Grand Rapids on March 27, 2018.	November 30, 2017	
DF	(Trinidad and Tobago) Jamal Jack	(United States) Colorado Springs Switchbacks	Contract option declined. Signed for Colorado Springs on January 24, 2018.	November 30, 2017	
GK	(United States) Trey Mitchell		Contract option declined. Retired.	November 30, 2017	
MF	(Ghana) Stephen Okai		Contract expired. Retired.	November 30, 2017	
GK	(United States) Matt Perrella	(United States) Atlantic City FC	Contract expired. Signed for Atlantic City on March 18, 2018.	November 30, 2017	
MF	(Brazil) Victor Souto	(United States) Atlantic City FC	Contract option declined. Signed for Atlantic City on March 6, 2018.	November 30, 2017	
MF	(United States) Jack Thompson		Contract expired. Retired.	November 30, 2017	
DF	(United States) Nick Thompson		Contract expired.	November 30, 2017	
DF	(United States) Taylor Washington	(United States) Nashville SC	Contract option declined. Signed for Nashville on December 7, 2017.	November 30, 2017	
FW	(Jamaica) Chevaughn Walsh	(United States) Saint Louis Club Atletico	No longer listed on roster. Signed for Saint Louis in 2018.	January 26, 2018	

== Awards ==
=== USL Team of the Week ===
Week	Starters	Bench	Opponent(s)	Link
4	(Jamaica) Neco Brett		Toronto FC II	
5	(United States) Tobi Adewole		Ottawa Fury FC	
6	(France) Thomas Vancaeyezeele		FC Cincinnati	
7	(United States) Tobi Adewole	(Haiti) Christiano François	Atlanta United 2	
8	(Jamaica) Neco Brett	(Scotland) Kevin Kerr	Toronto FC II	
9	(Canada) Jordan Dover		Indy Eleven	
10	(Jamaica) Romeo Parkes		Tampa Bay Rowdies	
11		(United States) Daniel Lynd	Penn FC	
12		(Jamaica) Neco Brett	Nashville SC; Richmond Kickers	
14		(Jamaica) Neco Brett	New York Red Bulls II	
15	(United States) Hugh Roberts		Charleston Battery	
16	(Jamaica) Kenardo Forbes		Louisville City	
17	(United States) Joseph Greenspan	(Haiti) Christiano François	North Carolina FC; Ottawa Fury FC	
21	(Jamaica) Neco Brett (United States) Hugh Roberts	(United States) Daniel Lynd	Richmond Kickers; Toronto FC II	
22		(Jamaica) Neco Brett	Bethlehem Steel FC	
25		(United States) Joseph Greenspan	Indy Eleven; FC Cincinnati	
26	(Jamaica) Kenardo Forbes		Bethlehem Steel FC	
28		(United States) Ben Zemanski	Indy Eleven	
29	(United States) Hugh Roberts		Penn FC; Charlotte Independence	
30	(United States) Joseph Greenspan		FC Cincinnati	

=== USL Player of the Week ===
Week	Player	Opponent(s)	Link
4	(Jamaica) Neco Brett	Toronto FC II	
21	(Jamaica) Neco Brett	Richmond Kickers; Toronto FC II	

=== Postseason ===
USL All-League Teams

- DF Joseph Greenspan – First Team
- MF Kenardo Forbes – Second Team

== Kits ==
Home	Away	Third

Type	Shirt	Shorts	Socks	First appearance / Record
Home	Gold	Black	Gold	Match 1 vs. Nashville / 9–6–3
Away	Black/Gray	Black	Black	Match 10 vs. Penn / 2–3–1
Third	White	White	White	Match 8 vs. Indy / 5–6–2

== See also ==
- 2018 in American soccer
- 2018 USL season
