= 2018 USL Cup playoffs =

2018 USL Cup
Tournament details
- Country: United States; Canada
- Teams: 16

Final positions
- Champions: Louisville City FC
- Runners-up: Phoenix Rising FC

Tournament statistics
- Matches played: 15
- Goals scored: 43 (2.87 per match)
- Top goal scorer(s): Didier Drogba; Brian Ownby; Michael Seaton (3)

The 2018 USL Cup playoffs was the postseason tournament following the 2018 United Soccer League regular season, the fourth since the league rebranded for the 2015 season, and second as a USSF Division II league. Including USL Pro history, it was the seventh postseason tournament. The tournament began on the weekend of October 20 and ended on November 8.

Sixteen teams (top 8 per conference) competed in the single elimination tournament. Teams were seeded one through eight in each conference. The conference semifinal winners played against each other in the Conference Championship, which served as the overall semifinals for the playoff. The winners of the Eastern and Western Conference Championship played for the USL Cup. The winner of the playoffs was to be crowned league champion.

FC Cincinnati clinched the USL regular-season title on September 26 and was the number one seed in the Eastern Conference.

== Conference standings ==
The top 8 teams from each conference advance to the USL playoffs.

Eastern Conference

| Pos | Team | Pld | Pts |
|---|---|---|---|
| 1 | FC Cincinnati (X) | 34 | 77 |
| 2 | Louisville City FC (C) | 34 | 66 |
| 3 | Pittsburgh Riverhounds SC | 34 | 59 |
| 4 | Charleston Battery | 34 | 56 |
| 5 | New York Red Bulls II | 34 | 52 |
| 6 | Bethlehem Steel FC | 34 | 50 |
| 7 | Indy Eleven | 34 | 49 |
| 8 | Nashville SC | 34 | 49 |
| 9 | North Carolina FC | 34 | 47 |
| 10 | Ottawa Fury | 34 | 45 |
| 11 | Charlotte Independence | 34 | 42 |
| 12 | Tampa Bay Rowdies | 34 | 41 |
| 13 | Penn FC | 34 | 37 |
| 14 | Atlanta United 2 | 34 | 31 |
| 15 | Richmond Kickers | 34 | 22 |
| 16 | Toronto FC II | 34 | 18 |

Source: 2018 USL standings
(C) Champions; (X) Regular Season League Champion

Western Conference

| Pos | Team | Pld | Pts |
|---|---|---|---|
| 1 | Orange County SC | 34 | 66 |
| 2 | Sacramento Republic | 34 | 65 |
| 3 | Phoenix Rising FC | 34 | 63 |
| 4 | Real Monarchs | 34 | 60 |
| 5 | Reno 1868 FC | 34 | 59 |
| 6 | Portland Timbers 2 | 34 | 55 |
| 7 | Swope Park Rangers | 34 | 53 |
| 8 | Saint Louis FC | 34 | 53 |
| 9 | San Antonio FC | 34 | 50 |
| 10 | OKC Energy FC | 34 | 43 |
| 11 | Colorado Springs Switchbacks | 34 | 39 |
| 12 | Fresno FC | 34 | 39 |
| 13 | Rio Grande Valley Toros | 34 | 38 |
| 14 | LA Galaxy II | 34 | 37 |
| 15 | Las Vegas Lights FC | 34 | 31 |
| 16 | Seattle Sounders FC 2 | 34 | 25 |
| 17 | Tulsa Roughnecks | 34 | 21 |

Source: 2018 USL standings

== Bracket ==
First round
October 20 – Nippert Stadium
#1 FC Cincinnati (p) | 1 (6)
#8 Nashville SC | 1 (5)
October 20 – MUSC Health Stadium
#4 Charleston Battery | 0
#5 New York Red Bulls II | 1
October 20 – Highmark Stadium
#3 Pittsburgh Riverhounds SC | 2 (7)
#6 Bethlehem Steel FC (p) | 2 (8)
October 20 – Louisville Slugger Field
#2 Louisville City FC | 4
#7 Indy Eleven | 1
October 20 – Championship Soccer Stadium
#1 Orange County SC | 4
#8 Saint Louis FC | 0
October 20 – Zions Bank Stadium
#4 Real Monarchs | 0
#5 Reno 1868 FC | 1
October 19 – PRFC Soccer Complex
#3 Phoenix Rising FC | 3
#6 Portland Timbers 2 | 0
October 20 – Papa Murphy's Park
#2 Sacramento Republic FC | 1
#7 Swope Park Rangers | 2

Conference Semifinals
October 27 – Nippert Stadium
#1 FC Cincinnati | 0
#5 New York Red Bulls II | 1
October 27 – Louisville Slugger Field
#6 Bethlehem Steel FC | 0
#2 Louisville City FC | 2
October 27 – Championship Soccer Stadium
#1 Orange County SC | 1
#5 Reno 1868 FC | 0
October 26 – PRFC Soccer Complex
#3 Phoenix Rising FC | 4
#7 Swope Park Rangers | 2

Conference finals
November 2 – Louisville Slugger Field
#5 New York Red Bulls II | 1
#2 Louisville City FC | 5
November 3 – Championship Soccer Stadium
#1 Orange County SC | 1
#3 Phoenix Rising FC | 2

USL championship
November 8 – Lynn Stadium (ESPN2)
#2 Louisville City FC | 1
#3 Phoenix Rising FC | 0

== Schedule ==
=== Conference quarterfinals ===
| October 20, 2018 East | FC Cincinnati | 1–1 (a.e.t.) (6–5 p) | Nashville SC | Cincinnati, Ohio |
| 4:00 p.m. EDT | Bone 95'; Smith (yellow card) 104'; Ledesma (yellow card) 111' | Report | Davis (yellow card) 110'; Bourgeois 115'; Tyrpak (yellow card) 116' | Stadium: Nippert Stadium; Attendance: 20,217; Referee: Farhad Dadkho |
| | Penalties |
| | Adi (penalty scored); McLaughlin (penalty scored); Smith (penalty scored); Hoyte (penalty scored); Lasso (penalty scored); Walker (penalty scored) | | (penalty scored) Doyle; (penalty scored) Allen; (penalty scored) Winn; (penalty scored) LaGrassa; (penalty scored) Tyrpak; (penalty missed) Davis |

| October 20, 2018 East | Charleston Battery | 0–1 | New York Red Bulls II | Charleston, South Carolina |
| 7:00 PM EDT | Bolt (yellow card) 16' | Report | Barlow 21'; Stroud (yellow card) 66' | Stadium: MUSC Health Stadium; Attendance: 1,687; Referee: Rosendo Mendoza |

| October 20, 2018 East | Pittsburgh Riverhounds SC | 2–2 (a.e.t.) (7–8 p) | Bethlehem Steel FC | Pittsburgh, Pennsylvania |
| 7:00 PM EDT | Zemanski 25'; Dover (yellow card) 86'; Roberts 105' (yellow card) 109'; Forbes (yellow card) 113'; Holland (red card) 119' | Report | Moumbagna (yellow card) 45'; Ngalina 70'; Chambers 109'; Nanco (yellow card) 111' | Stadium: Highmark Stadium; Attendance: 5,189; Referee: Michael Radchuk |
| | Penalties |
| | Kerr (penalty scored); Forbes (penalty scored); Banjo (penalty scored); Greenspan (penalty scored); François (penalty scored); Vancaeyezeele (penalty scored); Dabo (penalty scored); Lee (penalty missed) | | (penalty scored) Chambers; (penalty scored) Nanco; (penalty scored) Holness; (penalty scored) Moar; (penalty scored) Skundrich; (penalty scored) Mahoney; (penalty scored) Real; (penalty scored) Mbaizo |

| October 20, 2018 East | Louisville City FC | 4–1 | Indy Eleven | Louisville, Kentucky |
| 7:30 p.m. EDT | McCabe 29', 48' (yellow card) 66'; Ilić 42'; Lancaster 73' | Report | Mitchell (yellow card) 46'; Saad 67'; Ouimette (yellow card) 72' | Stadium: Louisville Slugger Field; Attendance: 6,763; Referee: Mark Allatin |

| October 19, 2018 West | Phoenix Rising FC | 3–0 | Portland Timbers 2 | Tempe, Arizona |
| 7:30 p.m. MST | Drogba 28'; Johnson 62'; Asante 90' | Report | Zambrano (yellow card) 40'; Hanson (yellow card) 84'; Diz Pe (red card) 90+5' | Stadium: Phoenix Rising Soccer Complex; Attendance: 7,511; Referee: Rubiel Vazquez |

| October 20, 2018 West | Real Monarchs | 0–1 | Reno 1868 FC | Herriman, Utah |
| 3:00 PM MDT | Velásquez (yellow card) 45+4' | Report | Brown 90+2' | Stadium: Zions Bank Stadium; Attendance: 3,000; Referee: Ismir Pekmic |

| October 20, 2018 West | Orange County SC | 4–0 | Saint Louis FC | Irvine, California |
| 7:00 PM PDT | Seaton 11', 29', 64' (yellow card) 21'; Quinn (yellow card) 47'; Bjurman 66' | Report | Walls (red card) 21'; Hertzog (yellow card) 88' | Stadium: Championship Soccer Stadium; Attendance: 3,360; Referee: Ramy Touchan |

| October 20, 2018 West | Sacramento Republic FC | 1–2 | Swope Park Rangers | Sacramento, California |
| 7:30 PM PDT | Bijev 16'; Matjašič (yellow card) 38'; Hord (yellow card) 68' | Report | Kuzain 27'; Barry 31'; Akhmatov (yellow card) 58' | Stadium: Papa Murphy's Park; Attendance: 11,569; Referee: Joe Dickerson |

=== Conference semifinals ===
| October 27, 2018 East | FC Cincinnati | 0–1 | New York Red Bulls II | Cincinnati, Ohio |
| 4:00 p.m. EDT | Adi (yellow card) 41' | Report | Moreno 12' (yellow card) 72' | Stadium: Nippert Stadium; Attendance: 16,617; Referee: Tim Ford |

| October 27, 2018 East | Louisville City FC | 2–0 | Bethlehem Steel FC | Louisville, Kentucky |
| 7:30 p.m. EDT | Ownby 34', 59' (yellow card) 79'; Smith (yellow card) 64' | Report | Moar (yellow card) 57'; Mbaizo (yellow card) 83'; Ofeimu (yellow card) 86' | Stadium: Louisville Slugger Field; Attendance: 6,881; Referee: Farhad Dadkho |

| October 26, 2018 West | Phoenix Rising FC | 4–2 | Swope Park Rangers | Tempe, Arizona |
| 7:30 p.m. MST | Johnson 22'; Drogba (yellow card) 29' (goal) 90+4'; Cortez 36'; Lambert 48' | Report | Blackwood 26'; Barry 33'; Akhmatov (yellow card) 49' | Stadium: Phoenix Rising Soccer Complex; Attendance: 7,707; Referee: Guido Gonzales Jr. |

| October 27, 2018 West | Orange County SC | 1–0 | Reno 1868 FC | Irvine, California |
| 7:00 PM PDT | Alston (yellow card) 21'; Quinn 29'; Duke (yellow card) 90+2' | Report | Richards (yellow card) 12'; Brown (yellow card) 41'; Hoppenot (yellow card) 45+2' | Stadium: Championship Soccer Stadium; Attendance: 4,021; Referee: Victor Rivas |

=== Conference finals ===
| November 2, 2018 East | Louisville City FC | 5–1 | New York Red Bulls II | Louisville, Kentucky |
| 7:30 p.m. EDT | Ilić 23' (pen.), (yellow card) 40'; Spencer 32'; Davis (yellow card) 61'; Craig (yellow card) 65'; Ownby (yellow card) 69', (goal) 81'; Williams 73', 75'; McCabe (yellow card) 80' | Report | Ndam (yellow card) 22'; Tinari (yellow card) 44'; Barlow 60' | Stadium: Louisville Slugger Field; Attendance: 10,059; Referee: Ramy Touchan |

| November 3, 2018 West | Orange County SC | 1–2 | Phoenix Rising FC | Irvine, California |
| 7:00 p.m. PDT | Chaplow (yellow card) 47'; Hashimoto 82' | Report | Cortez 2'; Drogba 73'; Forbes (yellow card) 90+7' | Stadium: Championship Soccer Stadium; Attendance: 5,189; Referee: Tim Ford |

=== USL championship ===
| November 8, 2018 Final | Louisville City FC | 1–0 | Phoenix Rising FC | Louisville, Kentucky |
| 8:00 PM EST | Smith (yellow card) 45'; Spencer 62', (yellow card) 90+1'; Ranjitsingh (yellow card) 90+3' | Report | Farrell (yellow card) 39'; Drogba (yellow card) 73'; Lambert (yellow card) 85' | Stadium: Lynn Stadium; Attendance: 7,025; Referee: Joe Dickerson |

Championship Game MVP: Luke Spencer (LOU)

== Top goalscorers ==
| Rank | Player | Club | Goals |
|---|---|---|---|
| 1 | (Ivory Coast) Didier Drogba | Phoenix Rising FC | 3 |
| 1 | (United States) Brian Ownby | Louisville City FC | 3 |
| 1 | (Jamaica) Michael Seaton | Orange County SC | 3 |
| 4 | (United States) Tom Barlow | New York Red Bulls II | 2 |
| 4 | (Guinea) Hadji Barry | Swope Park Rangers | 2 |
| 4 | (United States) Chris Cortez | Phoenix Rising FC | 2 |
| 4 | (Serbia) Ilija Ilić | Louisville City FC | 2 |
| 4 | (Jamaica) Jason Johnson | Phoenix Rising FC | 2 |
| 4 | (Republic of Ireland) Niall McCabe | Louisville City FC | 2 |
| 4 | (United States) Luke Spencer | Louisville City FC | 2 |
| 4 | (Jamaica) Devon Williams | Louisville City FC | 2 |
