= Ryan Hulings =

American soccer player (born 1991)

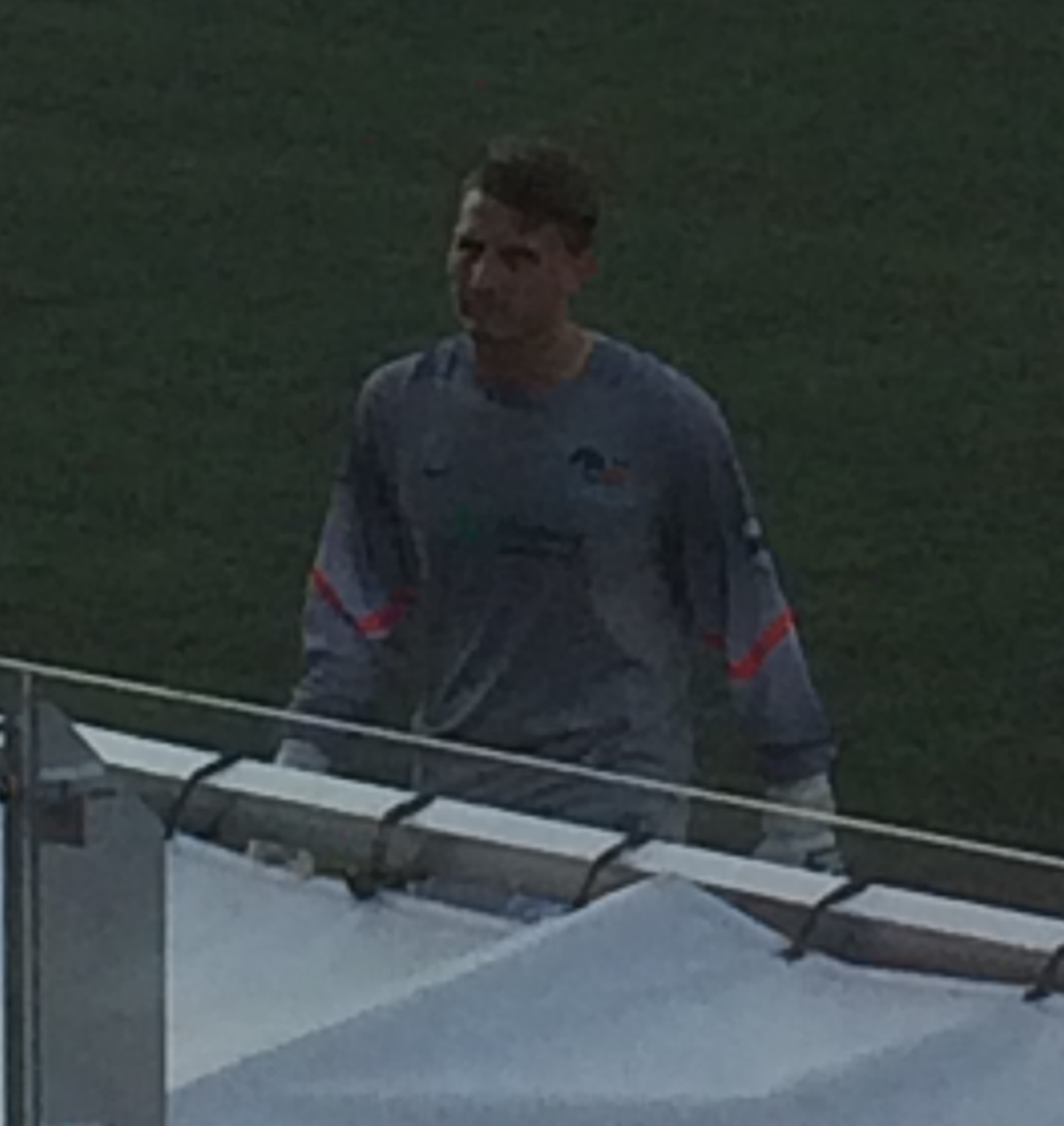
- Hulings in action during U.S. Open Cup, 2015

Personal information
- Date of birth: July 19, 1991 (age 35)
- Place of birth: Kokomo, Indiana, United States
- Height: 6 ft 0 in (1.83 m)
- Position: Goalkeeper

Team information
- Current team: Army West Point

College career
Years	Team	Apps	(Gls)
2008–2012	Baldwin Wallace Yellow Jackets	59	(0)

Senior career*
Years	Team	Apps	(Gls)
2013–2015	Pittsburgh Riverhounds	2	(0)
2014	→ Pittsburgh Riverhounds U23 (loan)	10	(0)
2016	Tampa Bay Rowdies 2	2	(0)
2017	Dayton Dynamo	10	(0)

Managerial career
- 2013–2015: Pittsburgh Riverhounds (academy)
- 2013: Baldwin Wallace Yellow Jackets (assistant)
- 2014–2015: Pitt Panthers (assistant)
- 2016–2018: Virginia Tech Hokies (assistant)
- 2018–2021: UMass Minutemen (assistant)
- 2021–2023: UAB Blazers (assistant)
- 2023–2024: Kentucky Wildcats (assistant)
- 2025–: Army West Point (assistant)
- * Club domestic league appearances and goals as of 3 June 2016

Ryan Hulings (born July 19, 1991) is a former professional American soccer player who currently coaches NCAA Division I for the Army West Point in the Patriot League.

== Career ==
=== Youth ===
Hulings played four years of high school soccer at Centerville High School, earning varsity letters three times. Hulings was a member of the Ohio South Olympic Development Program State team for four years, making the Region II team in 2008. Hulings also played for Metro FC youth team in his hometown of Dayton, Ohio and the U20 team of the Dayton Dutch Lions.

=== College ===
Hulings began playing college soccer for the Yellow Jackets of Baldwin Wallace University as a freshman during the 2008–2009 season. He served as the team's backup goalkeeper for his freshman campaign before being named the team's starter as a sophomore. He started all 20 of the team's matches during his junior year. In total, Hulings made 59 appearances for the team and was named its MVP during his senior season.

=== Semi-professional and professional ===
In 2013, Hulings went on trial with AFC Cleveland, Dayton Dutch Lions, and the Pittsburgh Riverhounds. He was signed by the Riverhounds after one tryout. Hulings professional debut with the club came against Wigan Athletic on July 19, 2013. During his first season with the club, he was loaned to the club's developmental team, Pittsburgh Riverhounds U23 of the Premier Development League, while providing cover for the first team. During the team's inaugural season, Hulings made 10 appearances for the U23 side.

On February 13, 2015, it was announced that Hulings had been resigned by the Riverhounds for the 2015 season. Hulings made his professional domestic debut for the senior side on May 20, 2015, in a 2015 Lamar Hunt U.S. Open Cup second round match the West Virginia Chaos as Ryan Thompson and Calle Brown had sustained minor injuries. The team went on to earn a 3–0 victory. A week later, Hulings kept a clean sheet again as Pittsburgh defeated the Tampa Bay Rowdies 1–0 to advance to the fourth round of the tournament. Three days later on May 30, 2015, Hulings made his league debut for the Riverhounds in what a columnist called the "club’s greatest ever game" as the team scored three goals in stoppage time for a 6–5 victory over the Harrisburg City Islanders.

On April 14, 2016, Hulings was announced as a member of the initial roster for the Tampa Bay Rowdies' NPSL reserve side Rowdies 2.

In May, 2017, it was announced that Hulings had signed with the Dayton Dynamo.

== Managerial career ==
After signing with the Riverhounds in 2013, Hulings began coaching roles within the organization, including Goalkeeper Director for the Riverhounds Development Academy. For the 2013 season, Hulings was an assistant coach for both the men's and women's teams at his alma mater, Baldwin Wallace University. At that time, he was also head goalkeeper coach for the men's team and assistant goalkeeper coach for the women's team. In 2014, Hulings was hired as an assistant coach with an emphasis on goalkeeping for the Pitt Panthers of the University of Pittsburgh. In August 2016, it was announced that Hulings would join the Virginia Tech Hokies staff as the team's goalkeeper coach. Following a successful two-year stint with the Hokies, which included two NCAA tournament appearances and reaching the Elite Eight in 2016, it was announced that Hulings would join the UMass Minutemen for the 2018 season. Following four years with UMass Minutemen, which included an NCAA tournament appearance in 2020, Hulings join the UAB Blazers staff in December 2021.
