= Pittsburgh Riverhounds 2 =

Soccer team based in Pittsburgh, Pennsylvania

- Founded: 2013 (13 years ago)
- Stadium: F.N.B. Stadium; Pittsburgh, Pennsylvania
- Owner: Tuffy Shallenberger
- Manager: Josh Kremers
- League: USL League Two
- Website: riverhounds.com/hounds-2
Home colors	Away colors

The Pittsburgh Riverhounds 2 are the men's reserve team of Pittsburgh Riverhounds SC, a soccer club based in Pittsburgh, Pennsylvania. The team competes in USL League Two (USL2), in the amateur fourth tier of the United States league system, and plays their home games at F.N.B. Stadium. Originally founded as Pittsburgh Riverhounds U23, the team played three seasons in the Great Lakes Division of the Premier Development League (now USL2) between 2014 and 2016, before folding. The team would be revived for the 2026 season and currently compete in the Great Forest Division of USL League Two.

== History ==
=== Pittsburgh Riverhounds U23 (2014–2016) ===
On November 26, 2013, it was announced that the Pittsburgh Riverhounds had secured a Premier Development League franchise that would begin play during the 2014 PDL season. At the time, no official name was unveiled but it was indicated that team would play under the Riverhounds umbrella. Riverhounds CEO Jason Kutney stated that the purpose of the team would be to provide standout local college players a place to play in the summer, something that they had not previously had. Kutney also believed that providing the opportunity to stay fit and play soccer in the region year-round would attract more players to the area in addition to providing players with the opportunity to be observed by USL and Major League Soccer scouts. At this time, it was also announced that the team would play their home matches at Highmark Stadium, likely as double-headers with their parent-club's matches.

The club's first head coach was Oz Bakirdan who was also head coach of the Illinois Central College Cougars at the time. The club's first match was scheduled for May 23, 2014 on the road against Chicago Fire Premier at Toyota Park. The Riverhounds went on to lose the match 1–2. The club played its inaugural home match at Highmark Stadium on June 4, 2013. The match ended in defeat also, with the Riverhounds losing 0–4 to the Michigan Bucks. The Riverhounds U23 finished the season in last place in the Great Lakes Division with 7 points from 14 matches. For their inaugural season, Geordhy Pantophlet was the team's top scorer with 7 points (3 goals, 1 assist) in 10 matches played. During the club's first season, at least 12 players from local colleges appeared on the 26-man roster.

Prior to the 2015 PDL season, Josh Rife replaced Oz Bakirdan as head coach. Riverhounds U23 finished the season slightly improved over the previous with one more win and draw. However, the team again finished 6th in the Great Lakes Division and missed the playoffs. Lucas Silva and Jason Twum led the team in scoring with two goals each. In April 2016 it was announced that Rife was replaced as head coach by Englishman and former Arsenal F.C. youth coach James McCaig. Riverhounds U23 again competed in the Great Lakes Conference of the Central Division. The club opened its season on May 25, 2016, against the Michigan Bucks. The club was disbanded following the 2016 season with limited resources being cited as the cause.

=== Pittsburgh Riverhounds 2 (2026–present) ===
Following the club's title win in the 2025 USL Championship, the Riverhounds announced the re-establishment of a USL League Two team, to be called Pittsburgh Riverhounds 2, for the 2026 season. Josh Kremers, the Boys Regional League Director for the Riverhounds Academy, was announced as the team's head coach.

== Stadium ==
- F.N.B. Stadium (2013–2016, 2026 - present)

== Team ==
=== Notable former players ===
Players who have signed for the Riverhound's first team:

- (United States) Ryan Hulings

Players who have signed for other professional clubs:

- (United States) Daniel Lynd — Rochester Rhinos
- (United States) Tyler Rudy — New England Revolution
- (Jamaica) Devon Williams — New York Red Bulls II

== Seasons ==
List of Pittsburgh Riverhounds men's reserve team seasons
Season	League	Pl	W	D	L	GF	GA	GD	Pos	Playoffs	Top goalscorer	Ref.
2014	PDL	14	2	1	11	13	37	–24	6th of 6	DNQ	(Netherlands) Geordhy Pantophlet (3)	
2015	PDL	14	3	2	9	10	31	–21	6th of 7	DNQ	(Brazil) Lucas Silva and (England) Jason Twum (2)	
2016	PDL	14	2	4	8	14	30	–16	6th of 7	DNQ	(United States) Anthony Virgara (3)	
2026	USL2	10	6	4	2	23	18	+5	3rd of 7	DNQ	Nicholas Legendre (6)	

== Managerial history ==
#	Head coach	Seasons	W	L	T	App	W	L	T	W	L	Honors
#	Head coach	Seasons	PDL Regular Season			PDL Playoffs				U.S. Open Cup		Honors
1	Oz Bakirdan	2014	2	11	1	0	0	0	0	0	0	
2	Josh Rife	2015	3	9	2	0	0	0	0	0	0	
3	James McCaig	2016	2	8	4	0	0	0	0	0	0	
4	Josh Kremers	2026	6	2	4	0	0	0	0	0	0	
