= Daniel Lynd =

American soccer player

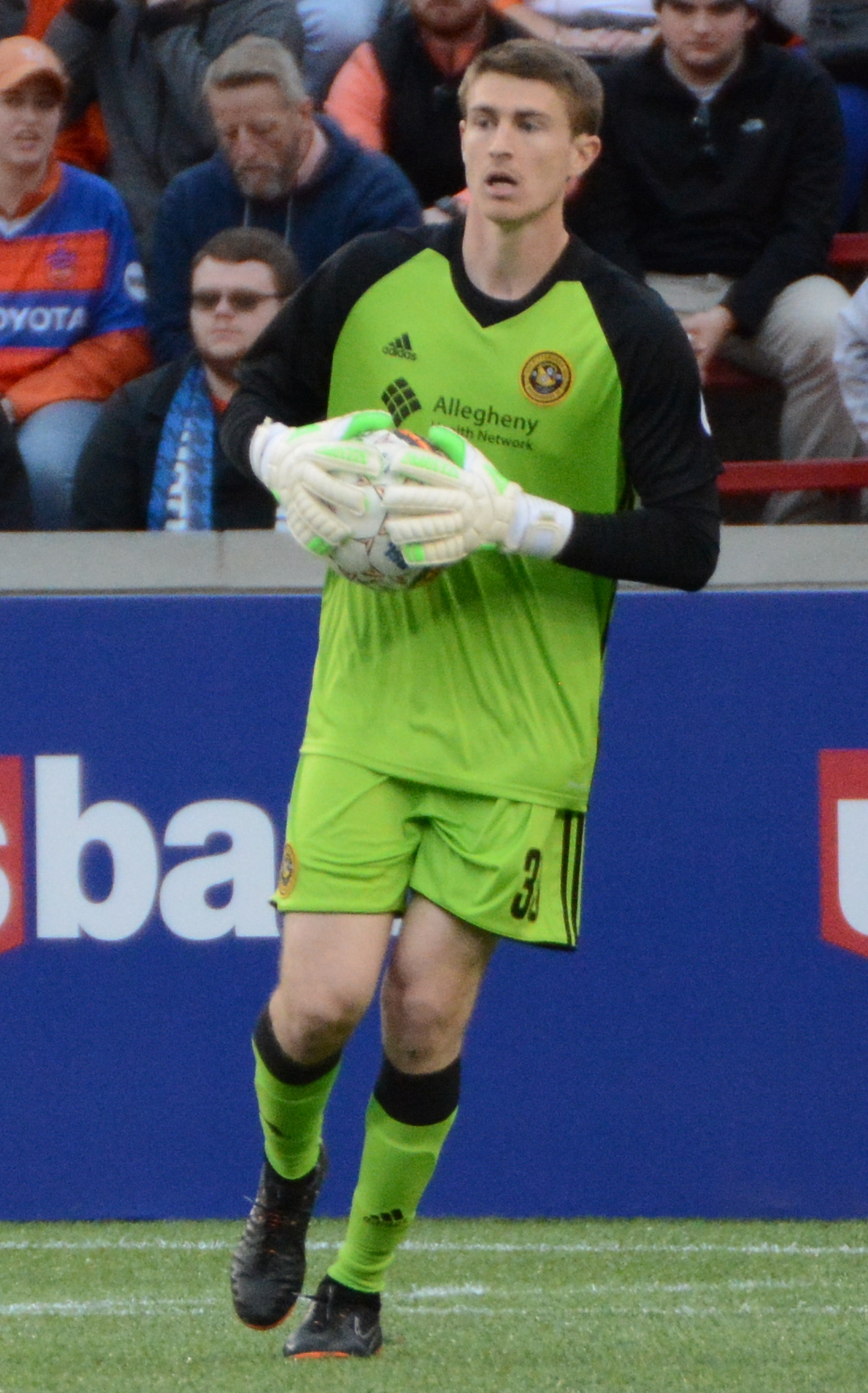
- Lynd playing for Pittsburgh Riverhounds in 2018

Personal information
- Full name: Daniel Thomas Lynd
- Date of birth: March 4, 1994 (age 32)
- Place of birth: Penfield, New York, United States
- Height: 6 ft 4 in (1.93 m)
- Position: Goalkeeper

College career
Years	Team	Apps	(Gls)
2012–2015	Pittsburgh Panthers	51	(0)

Senior career*
Years	Team	Apps	(Gls)
2014–2015	Pittsburgh Riverhounds U23	8	(0)
2016–2017	Rochester Rhinos	11	(0)
2018	Pittsburgh Riverhounds SC	25	(0)

Managerial career
- 2018–: Brockport Golden Eagles (asst.)
- * Club domestic league appearances and goals as of 19 April 2021

Daniel Thomas Lynd (born March 4, 1994) is an American soccer player who is currently an assistant coach for the Brockport Golden Eagles.

== Career ==
=== College and amateur ===
Lynd played four years of college soccer at the University of Pittsburgh between 2012 and 2015.

Lynd also played with Premier Development League sides Pittsburgh Riverhounds U23.

=== Professional ===
Lynd signed his first professional deal with United Soccer League club Rochester Rhinos on April 22, 2016.
