= Ewan Grandison =

Jamaican footballer (born 1991)

Personal information
- Date of birth: 28 January 1991 (age 35)
- Place of birth: May Pen, Jamaica
- Height: 1.82 m (5 ft 11 1/2 in)
- Position: Midfielder

Senior career*
Years	Team	Apps	(Gls)
2011–2018	Portmore United	205	(20)
2018	Central	?	(3)
2019	Memphis 901	29	(0)

International career^{‡}
2012–2017	Jamaica	12	(0)
Medal record
Men's football
Representing Jamaica
CONCACAF Gold Cup
Runner-up	2017 United States	Team
- * Club domestic league appearances and goals as of 23 October 2019 ‡ National team caps and goals as of 15 February 2018

Ewan Grandison (born 28 January 1991) is a Jamaican former footballer who played as a midfielder.

== Career ==
Grandison has played club football for Portmore United. Grandison scored crucial goals for Portmore United during their RSPL title winning campaign. In the 2016–17 Red Stripe Premier League competition he has scored 8 goals in the league.

On 10 December 2018, Grandison signed with USL Championship side Memphis 901 FC ahead of their inaugural 2019 season.

== International career ==
After playing for Jamaica youth national teams, he made his senior international debut for Jamaica in 2012. He was recently recalled by new coach Theodore Withmore and played in the Caribbean Cup qualifiers against Guyana and Suriname. He played in the friendly games versus the USA on 3 February and Honduras on 16 February 2017.

== Honours ==
Portmore United

- Winner of Jamaica National Premier League in 2012 and 2018
