= Thomas Vancaeyezeele =

French Guianan footballer (born 1994)

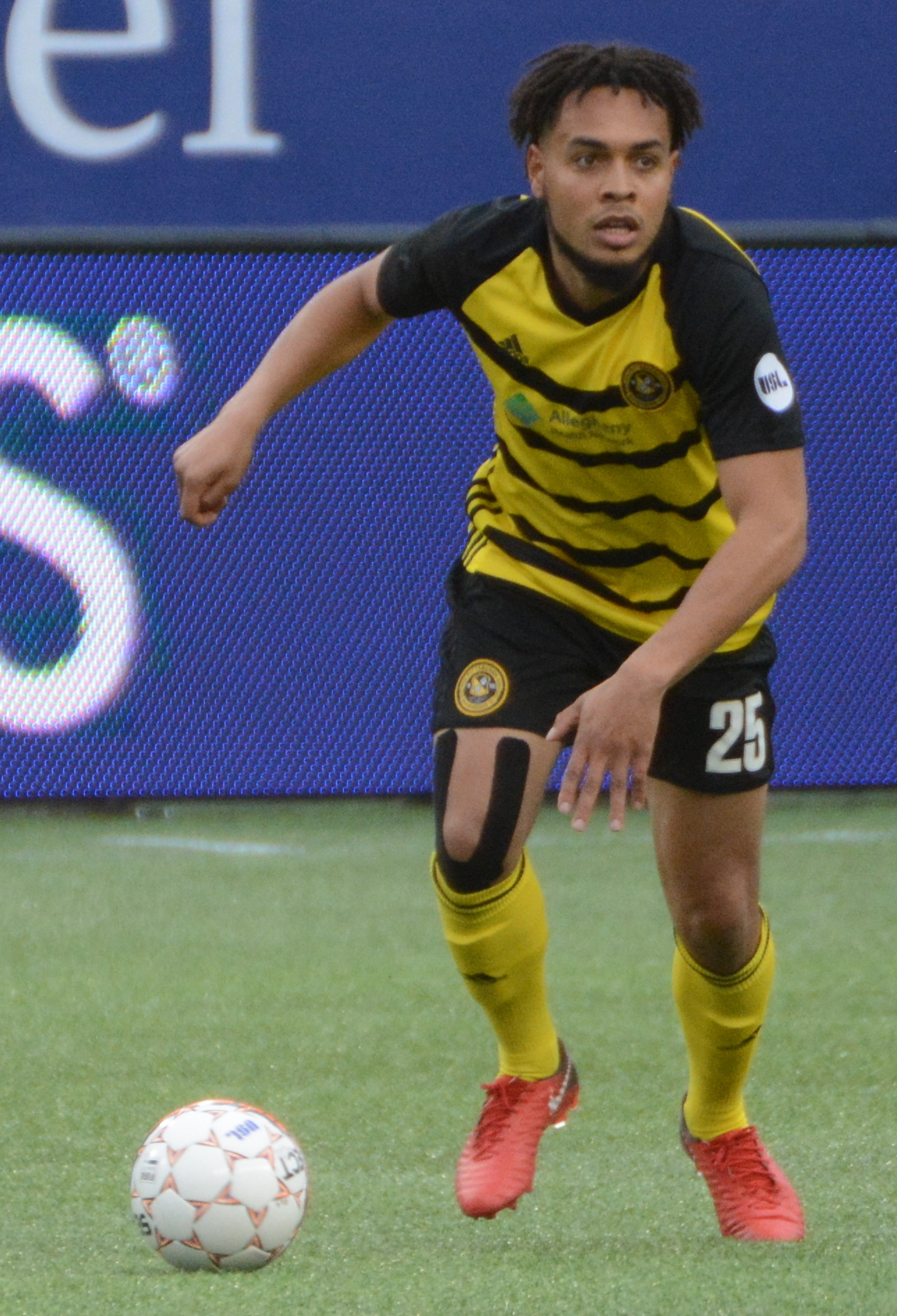
- Vancaeyezeele playing for Pittsburgh Riverhounds in 2018

Personal information
- Date of birth: 27 July 1994 (age 32)
- Place of birth: Arras, France
- Height: 1.80 m (5 ft 11 in)
- Positions: Defender; midfielder

Team information
- Current team: Brooklyn FC
- Number: 92

Youth career
- 2005–2011: Caen

College career
Years	Team	Apps	(Gls)
2016–2017	Charleston Golden Eagles	41	(5)

Senior career*
Years	Team	Apps	(Gls)
2011–2012	Caen II	1	(0)
2013–2014	Hérouvillais	21	(1)
2015	CD Vitoria		
2016	SW Florida Adrenaline	10	(1)
2017	Mississippi Brilla	14	(2)
2018–2020	Pittsburgh Riverhounds SC	78	(5)
2021	San Diego Loyal	7	(0)
2021–2022	Birmingham Legion	29	(1)
2022	Tampa Bay Rowdies	8	(0)
2023	Bassin d'Arcachon		
2024	Hartford Athletic	28	(0)
2025	Tampa Bay Rowdies	25	(0)
2026–	Brooklyn FC	25	(0)

International career^{‡}
2019–	French Guiana	16	(0)
- * Club domestic league appearances and goals as of 4 November 2026 ‡ National team caps and goals as of 30 September 2026

Thomas Vancaeyezeele (born 27 July 1994) is a footballer who plays as a defender for the Brooklyn FC in the USL Championship. Born in metropolitan France, he represents the French Guiana national team.

== Career ==
=== Youth and college ===
Vancaeyezeele played for the youth sides of Stade Malherbe Caen of Ligue 1. For the 2011–12 season he was promoted to the reserve side, making one appearance in the Championnat National 2. For the 2013–14 season, he transferred to Hérouvillais of the Championnat National 3. During the season he made 21 appearances, scoring a single goal. In February 2015, he signed on for a stint with CD Vitoria of Spain's Fifth Division. He made his debut for the club on 23 February against CD El Pilar Marianistas.

In 2015, Vancaeyezeele traveled to the United States to play college soccer for the Charleston Golden Eagles of the University of Charleston. Over his two season with the club, he made 41 appearances, scoring five goals. The team won the school's first NCAA Division II Championship during the 2017 season, defeating the Lynn Fighting Knights 3–1 in the final. Following the match, Vancaeyezeele was named the NCAA Division II Player of the Year, in addition to several other accolades.

=== Semi-professional ===
In 2016, Vancaeyezeele played club football for the SW Florida Adrenaline of the semi-professional Premier Development League. Over the course of the season, he made ten regular season appearances, scoring one goal. For the 2017 season, Vancaeyezeele moved to the Mississippi Brilla, also of the PDL. During the season, he made 14 regular season appearances, scoring two goals, and a further three appearances in the playoffs.

=== Professional ===
After graduation from the University of Charleston, Vancaeyezeele was invited to participate in the 2018 Major League Soccer Combine. However, he was not selected in the 2018 MLS SuperDraft, despite being projected as a potential early pick.

In March 2018, Vancaeyezeele went on trial with Pittsburgh Riverhounds SC of the United Soccer League, the second tier of the United States soccer league system. He made two preseason appearances for the team, including one against league rivals Penn FC in which he set up Romeo Parkes's game-winning goal. On 14 March 2018, he was signed to a one-year contract with a club option for an additional year. He made his professional debut in the opening match of the 2018 season, a 0–0 draw at Nashville SC in which he started and played the full 90 minutes. Over the first two matches of the season, Vancaeyezeele maintained the team's highest passing percentage in the offensive half and the team lead in interceptions.

Vancaeyezeele scored his first professional goal on 20 April 2018, Pittsburgh's second goal of a 2–2 draw away at FC Cincinnati. He was then named to the USL Team of the Week for the first time for his performance in the match. Vancaeyezeele scored his first U.S. Open Cup goal in a 2–1 victory over Erie Commodores FC on 16 May 2018.

During his first season with the club, he made a team-high 32 starts, scoring two league goals. On 7 December 2018 it was announced that Vancaeyezeele had signed a one-year extension with the team with a club option for an additional year.

On 12 December 2020, Vancaeyezeele moved to USL Championship side San Diego Loyal ahead of the 2021 season. On 8 July 2021 he switched to fellow USL Championship club Birmingham Legion.

On 26 May 2022 the Tampa Bay Rowdies announced that they had acquired Vancaeyezeele from Birmingham Legion for an international slot and an undisclosed fee. He was released by Tampa following their 2022 season.

Vancaeyezeele signed with Hartford Athletic in November 2023.

Vancaeyezeele returned to the Tampa Bay Rowdies on 31 January 2025.

== International career ==
Vancaeyezeele was called up to by French Guiana for the first time in September 2019 for 2019–20 CONCACAF Nations League B matches against Belize and St. Kitts and Nevis. He qualifies to represent the nation through family ties. After French Guiana was awarded a 3–0 victory over Belize when the visitors did not arrive in time for the match, Vancaeyezeele made his debut, starting and playing the full match, in the eventual 2–2 draw with St. Kitts and Nevis.

== Career statistics ==
=== Club ===
As of 1 October 2019

Club	Season	League			Cup (Note: All appearances in the U.S. Open Cup)		Continental		Other		Total	
Club	Season	Division	Apps	Goals	Apps	Goals	Apps	Goals	Apps	Goals	Apps	Goals
Caen II	2011–12	CFA	1	0	—		—		—		1	0
Hérouvillais	2013–14	CFA 2	21	1	—		—		—		21+	1+
CD Vitoria	2014–15	División de Honor de Guipúzcoa	1+	0+	—		—		—		1+	0+
SW Florida Adrenaline	2016	PDL	10	1	—		—		—		10	1
Mississippi Brilla	2017	PDL	14	2	—		—		3 (Note: Appearances in the PDL playoffs)	0	17	2
Pittsburgh Riverhounds SC	2018	USL Championship	33	2	1	1	—		1 (Note: Appearance in the USL Cup Playoffs)	0	35	3
Pittsburgh Riverhounds SC	2019	USL Championship	29	2	3	0	—		0	0	32	2
Pittsburgh Riverhounds SC	Total		62	4	4	1	0	0	1	0	67	5
Career total			109+	8+	4+	1+	0	0	4	0	117+	9+

=== International ===
As of match played 30 September 2026

Appearances and goals by national team and year
National team	Year	Apps	Goals
French Guiana	2019	5	0
French Guiana	2020	—	
French Guiana	2021	1	0
French Guiana	2022	—	
French Guiana	2023	2	0
French Guiana	2024	6	0
French Guiana	2025	—	
French Guiana	2026	2	0
Total		16	0
