= Joe Holland (footballer) =

English footballer (born 1993)

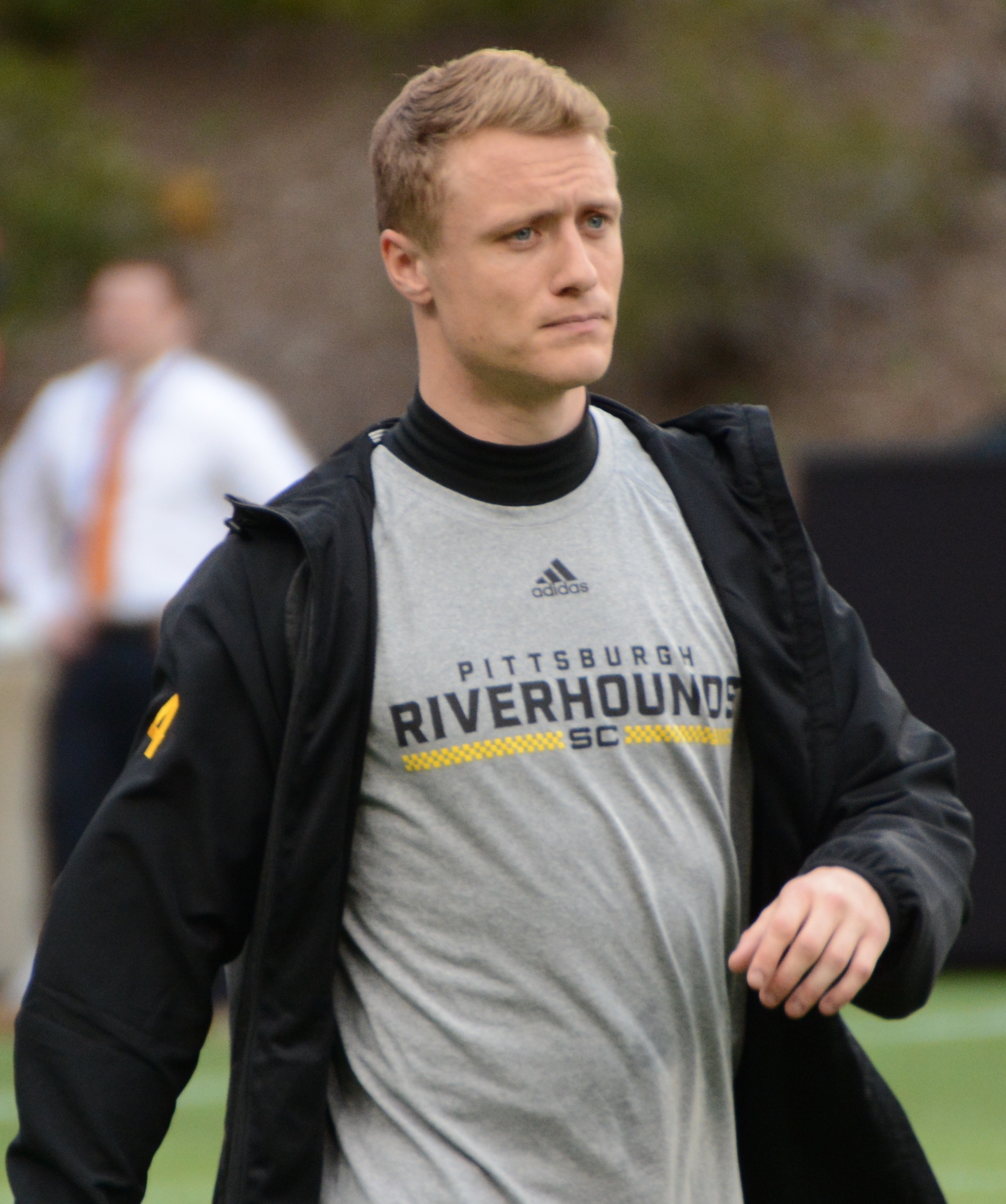
- Holland with Pittsburgh Riverhounds in 2018

Personal information
- Full name: Joseph Holland
- Date of birth: 21 April 1993 (age 33)
- Place of birth: Birmingham, England
- Position: Midfielder

College career
Years	Team	Apps	(Gls)
2012–2016	Hofstra Pride	78	(19)

Senior career*
Years	Team	Apps	(Gls)
2014–2015	Long Island Rough Riders	18	(7)
2016	Ventura County Fusion	11	(7)
2017	Houston Dynamo	5	(0)
2017	→ Rio Grande Valley FC (loan)	13	(4)
2018	Pittsburgh Riverhounds SC	14	(0)
2019	Birmingham Legion	15	(0)
- * Club domestic league appearances and goals

Joseph Holland (born 21 April 1993) is an English former professional footballer who played as a midfielder.

== Career ==
=== College and youth ===
Holland moved to the United States in 2012 to play college soccer at Hofstra University, where he played until 2016, including a redshirt year in 2013. While playing for Hofstra, Holland was named 2012 CAA Rookie of the Year, second team All-CAA in 2012, first team All-CAA in 2014, 2015, and 2016, NSCAA second team All-American in 2015, and CAA Player of the Year in 2015.

While at college, Holland played with USL PDL clubs Long Island Rough Riders and Ventura County Fusion.

=== Professional ===
==== Houston Dynamo ====
On 13 January 2017, Holland was selected 10th overall in the 2017 MLS SuperDraft by the Houston Dynamo. He signed with Houston on 1 March 2017. He made his Dynamo debut on 17 May, coming off the bench in a 2–0 loss to the Philadelphia Union. He made 5 MLS appearances and played twice in the Open Cup for the Dynamo during the 2017 season. Although Houston qualified for the 2017 MLS playoffs, Holland did not appear in any of Houston's 5 games.

He spent most of the 2017 season on loan at Rio Grande Valley FC Toros, Houston's USL affiliate. Holland made his professional and Toros debut on 22 April during a 1–0 loss to the Tulsa Roughnecks. He scored his first goal for RGVFC on April 29 in a 3–0 win over OKC Energy. He ended the year having scored 4 goals and picking up 1 assist in 13 appearances for the Toros.

On 5 December 2017, Houston declined Holland's contract option for 2018.

==== Pittsburgh Riverhounds ====
On 27 February 2018, Holland signed with USL side Pittsburgh Riverhounds. He made his Riverhounds debut on 24 March in a 0–0 draw with Nashville SC. He ended the regular season with 1 assist and 14 appearances, helping Pittsburgh finish 3rd in the Eastern Conference. In the Riverhounds opening playoff game, Holland came on as a late substitute. In the 119th minute, he got a red card with the game tied at 2–2. Pittsburgh would lose to Bethlehem Steel 8–7 in a penalty shoot-out.

==== Birmingham Legion ====
On 20 November 2018, Holland signed with USL Championship side Birmingham Legion. He made his debut for Birmingham on 16 March, coming on as a substitute in a 1–0 loss to Ottawa Fury. Holland made 15 appearances for the Legion in the USLC regular season and 2 in the Open Cup, but he did not appear in either of their playoff games.

== Career statistics ==
As of 31 January 2021

Club	Season	League			Open Cup		Playoffs		Continental		Total	
Club	Season	Division	Apps	Goals	Apps	Goals	Apps	Goals	Apps	Goals	Apps	Goals
Long Island Rough Riders	2014	PDL	6	2	—		—		—		6	2
Long Island Rough Riders	2015	PDL	12	5	2	2	0	0	—		14	7
Long Island Rough Riders	Rough Riders Total		18	7	2	2	0	0	0	0	20	9
Ventura County Fusion	2016	PDL	11	7	0	0	—		—		11	7
Houston Dynamo	2017	MLS	5	0	2	0	0	0	—		7	0
Rio Grande Valley FC	2017	USL	13	4	—		—		—		13	4
Pittsburgh Riverhounds	2018	USL	14	0	2	0	1	0	—		17	0
Birmingham Legion	2019	USLC	15	0	2	0	0	0	—		17	0
Career Total			76	18	8	2	1	0	0	0	85	20

== Personal life ==
Holland's parents are Claire Holland and Matthew Taylor, and he has a younger brother, Cornell Holland.
