= Devon Williams (footballer) =

Jamaican footballer (born 1992)

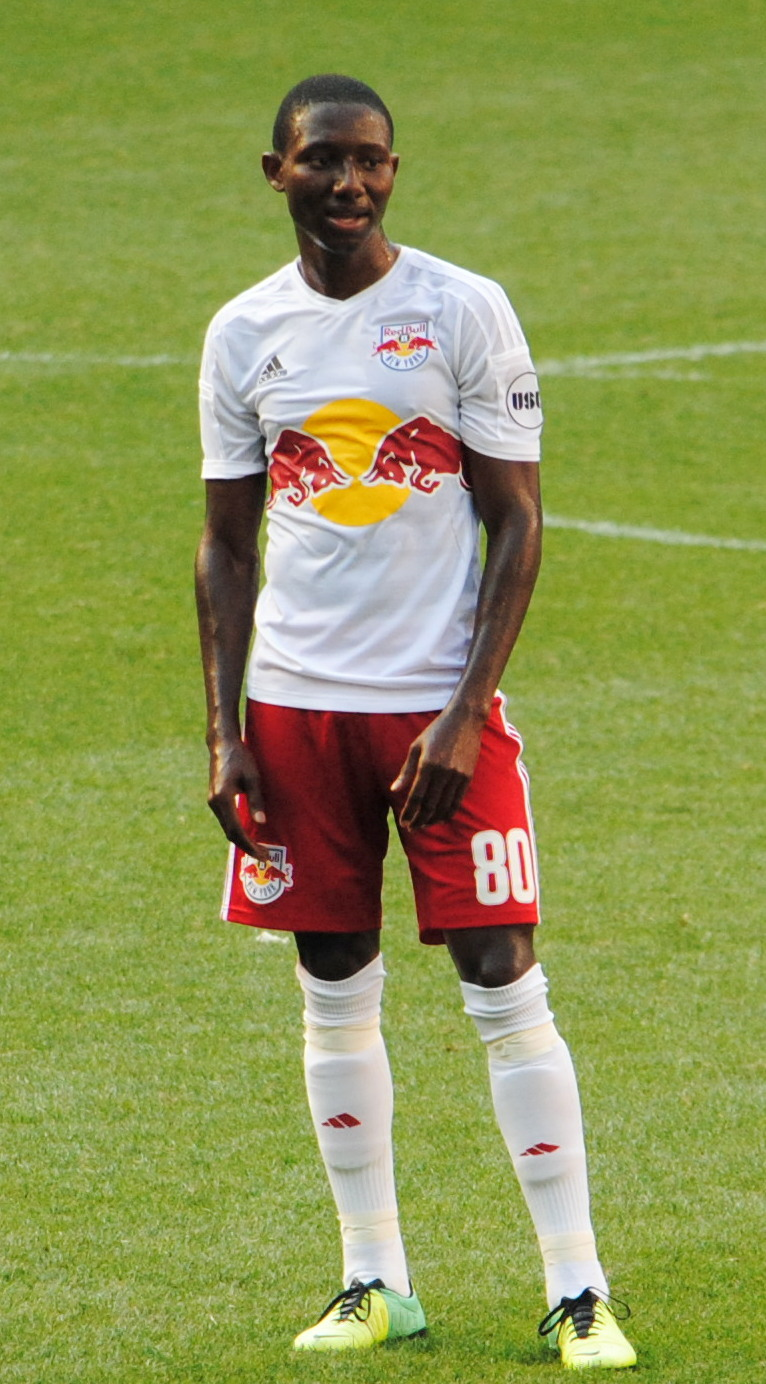
- Williams with New York Red Bulls II in 2015

Personal information
- Full name: Devon Chesterton Williams
- Date of birth: 8 April 1992 (age 34)
- Place of birth: Kingston, Jamaica
- Height: 1.70 m (5 ft 7 in)
- Position: Midfielder

Team information
- Current team: Colorado Springs Switchbacks
- Number: 80

Youth career
- 2008–2010: St. George's
- 2010–2011: Real Mona

College career
Years	Team	Apps	(Gls)
2011–2014	Robert Morris Colonials	71	(8)

Senior career*
Years	Team	Apps	(Gls)
2014	Pittsburgh Riverhounds U23	9	(0)
2015–2016	New York Red Bulls II	39	(2)
2017–2020	Louisville City	106	(9)
2021–2022	Miami FC	51	(3)
2023–2024	Colorado Springs Switchbacks	66	(0)
2025	Lexington SC	24	(0)
2026–	Colorado Springs Switchbacks	14	(0)

International career^{‡}
2011	Jamaica U20	5	(0)
2010–	Jamaica	37	(1)
- * Club domestic league appearances and goals as of 30 October 2025 ‡ National team caps and goals as of 2 November 2026

Devon Chesterton "Speedy" Williams (born 8 April 1992) is a Jamaican professional footballer who plays as a midfielder for USL Championship club Colorado Springs Switchbacks FC and the Jamaica national team.

== Earlier career ==
=== Youth and college ===
Born in Kingston, Jamaica, Williams began his career in the youth ranks of St. George's College. While with St.George's Williams led the school to two youth championships in 2008 and 2009. In 2010, he joined Real Mona F.C. and remained at the club through 2014. In 2011 Williams accepted an offer to play college soccer for Robert Morris Colonials. Williams was handed the number 10 shirt and in his four years with the Colonials he appeared in 71 matches scoring 6 goals and recording 15 assists. During the 2014 season Williams also played with Pittsburgh Riverhounds U23.

== Club career ==
=== New York Red Bulls ===
After a lengthy trial with the club, Williams signed with New York Red Bulls II on 8 July 2015. He made his debut for the club on 18 July 2015, appearing as a starter in a 2–0 victory over Harrisburg City Islanders. The following week Williams recorded his first assist for New York, helping Red Bull II to a 4–3 victory over Richmond Kickers. On 12 August 2015, Williams recorded his second assist of the season when he spotted Stefano Bonomo with a perfect cross into the box which was headed in helping NYRB II to a 1–1 draw against Charlotte Independence. On 22 August 2015, Williams scored his first goal as a professional, helping New York to a 2–0 victory over Toronto FC II.

On 6 July 2016, he made his New York Red Bulls debut in a mid-season friendly against Mexican powerhouse Club America. The Red Bulls went on to win the match by a 2–0 score. On 12 August 2016 Williams scored his first goal of the season for New York in a 5–1 victory over Orlando City B.

=== Louisville City FC ===
On 26 December 2021, Louisville City FC announced that they had signed Williams for the 2017 season. Williams made his debut for Louisville on 25 March 2017, in a 0–0 draw versus Saint Louis FC. Williams scored his first goal for Louisville on 10 September 2017, during a 3–0 victory over Pittsburgh Riverhounds FC.

=== Miami FC ===
On 8 January 2021, Williams was signed by USL Championship side Miami FC ahead of the 2021 season. Williams made his debut for his new team on 2 May 2021, during a 2–1 victory over Loudoun United FC. He scored his first goal for Miami on 15 May, the only goal in a victory over his former club, New York Red Bulls II. On 17 August 2021, Williams was named USL Championship Player of the Week for week 17 of the 2021 season in recognition of his brace scored against Pittsburgh in a 3–2 victory for Miami.

=== Colorado Springs Switchbacks ===
On 22 December 2022, it was announced that Williams would join USL Championship side Colorado Springs Switchbacks for the 2023 season. Williams was a member of the Switchbacks team that won the league championship in the 2024 season.

=== Lexington SC ===
On 12 December 2024, Williams signed with Lexington SC ahead of the team's first season competing in the USL Championship.

== International career ==
Williams has represented Jamaica at the U-20 national team level, making five appearances for his country. On 11 August 2010, he made his first international appearance with the senior national team, appearing in a 3–1 victory over Trinidad and Tobago.

== Career statistics ==
As of 21 July 2022

Club	Season	League		Playoffs		US Open Cup		CONCACAF		Total	
Club	Season	Apps	Goals	Apps	Goals	Apps	Goals	Apps	Goals	Apps	Goals
New York Red Bulls II	2015	11	1	2	0	0	0	0	0	13	1
New York Red Bulls II	2016	25	1	1	0	0	0	0	0	26	1
New York Red Bulls II	Total	36	2	3	0	0	0	0	0	39	2
Louisville City	2017	19	1	4	0	4	0	0	0	27	1
Louisville City	2018	30	1	4	2	1	0	0	0	35	3
Louisville City	2019	26	1	4	0	0	0	0	0	30	1
Louisville City	2020	16	4	3	0	0	0	0	0	19	4
Louisville City	Total	91	7	15	2	5	0	0	0	111	9
Miami FC	2021	23	3	1	0	0	0	0	0	24	3
Miami FC	2022	16	0	0	0	2	0	0	0	18	0
Miami FC	Total	39	3	1	0	2	0	0	0	42	3
Career total		166	12	19	2	7	0	0	0	192	14

=== International ===
As of match played 7 October 2021

Appearances and goals by national team and year
National team	Year	Apps	Goals
Jamaica	2010	1	0
Jamaica	2017	1	0
Jamaica	2018	3	0
Jamaica	2019	7	1
Jamaica	2021	11	0
Total		23	1

=== International goals ===
Scores and results list Jamaica's goal tally first.

No.	Date	Venue	Opponent	Score	Result	Competition
1.	12 October 2019	Independence Park, Kingston, Jamaica	Aruba	1–0	2–0	2019–20 CONCACAF Nations League B

== Honors ==
=== Club ===
New York Red Bulls II

- USL Cup (1): 2016

Louisville City FC

- USL Cup (2): 2017, 2018

Colorado Springs Switchbacks FC

- USL Cup (1): 2024

=== Individual ===
- USL Championship All League First Team: 2020
