= Todd Pratzner =

American soccer player

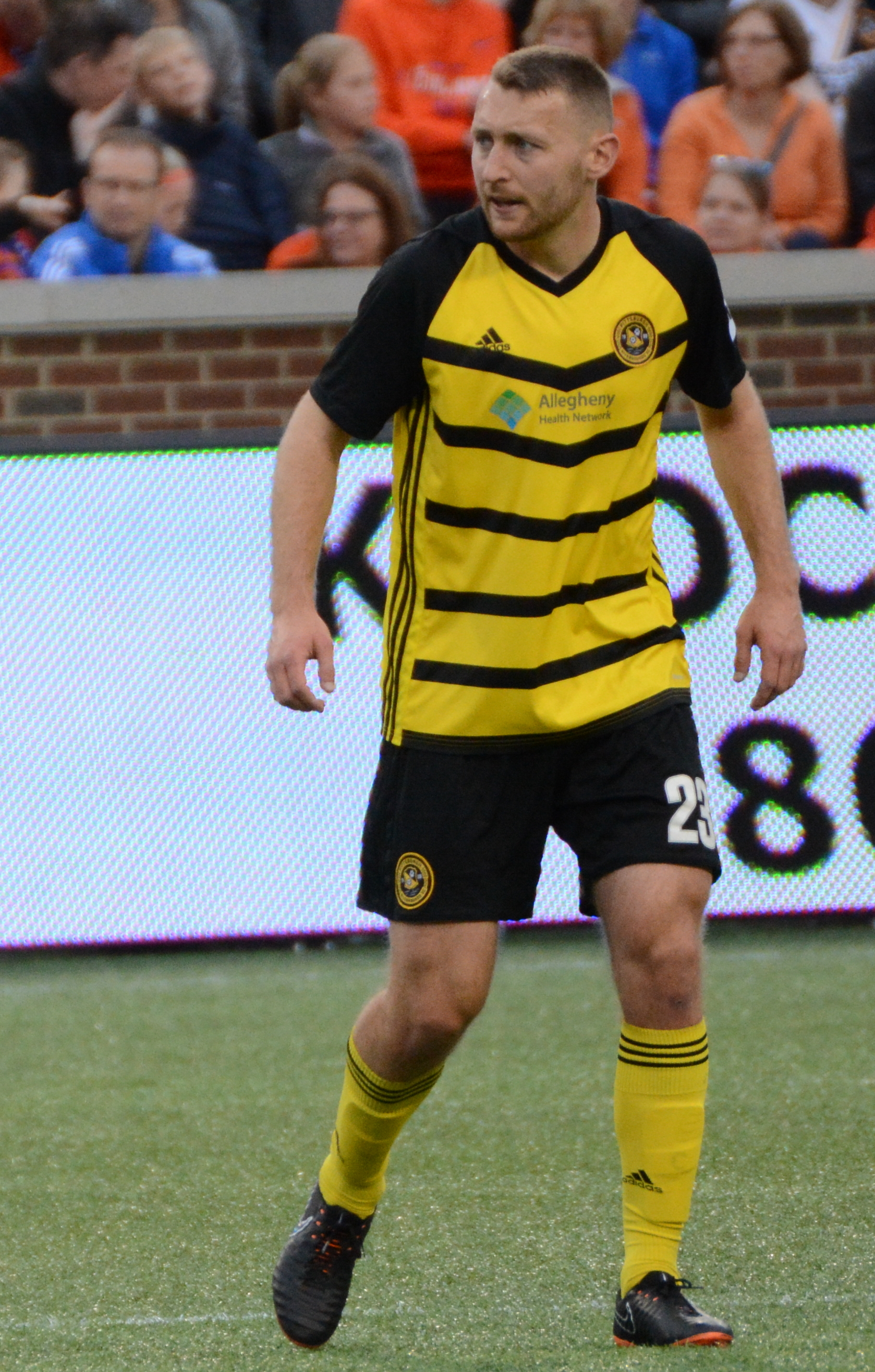
- Pratzner playing for Pittsburgh Riverhounds in 2018

Personal information
- Date of birth: August 10, 1994 (age 32)
- Place of birth: Lancaster, Pennsylvania, United States
- Height: 6 ft 1 in (1.85 m)
- Position: Defender

Youth career
- –2011: PA Classics
- 2011–2013: Philadelphia Union

College career
Years	Team	Apps	(Gls)
2013–2016	Xavier Musketeers	71	(4)

Senior career*
Years	Team	Apps	(Gls)
2014–2015	Baltimore Bohemians	6	(0)
2017	Rochester Rhinos	13	(0)
2018	Pittsburgh Riverhounds	17	(0)
2019	Memphis 901	10	(0)
2019	Pittsburgh Riverhounds	5	(0)
- * Club domestic league appearances and goals as of July 13, 2021

Todd Pratzner (born August 10, 1994) is an American soccer player who plays as a defender.

== Career ==
Pratzner played four years of college soccer at Xavier University between 2013 and 2016, where he made a total of 71 appearances and scored 4 goals.

Pratzner signed with United Soccer League club Rochester Rhinos on March 29, 2017.

On March 7, 2018, following the announcement that Rochester would be on hiatus for the 2018 season, Pratzner (along with many of his teammates) signed with Pittsburgh Riverhounds SC.

Pratzner joined USL Championship side Memphis 901 on December 14, 2018, ahead of their inaugural season.

On September 18, 2019, Pratzner returned to Pittsburgh Riverhounds for the remainder of the season. Pratzner left Pittsburgh at the end of the season.
