= Dan Metzger =

American professional soccer player (born 1993)

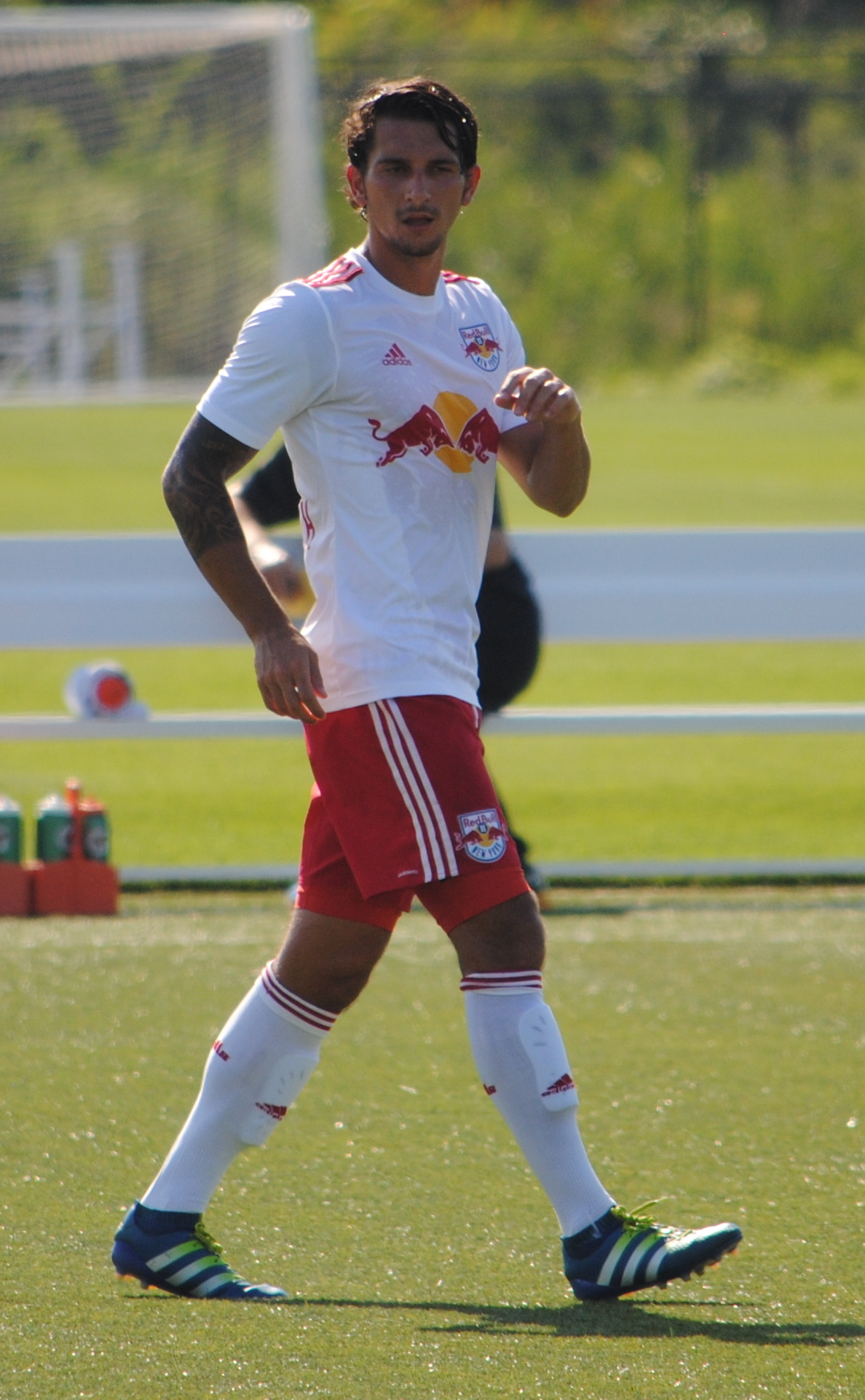
- Metzger with New York Red Bulls II

Personal information
- Full name: Daniel James Metzger
- Date of birth: August 6, 1993 (age 33)
- Place of birth: Holmdel Township, New Jersey, United States
- Height: 1.78 m (5 ft 10 in)
- Position: Midfielder

Youth career
- 2008–2010: Players Development Academy
- 2010–2011: New York Red Bulls

College career
Years	Team	Apps	(Gls)
2011–2014	Maryland Terrapins	88	(8)

Senior career*
Years	Team	Apps	(Gls)
2013	Austin Aztex	5	(0)
2015–2017	New York Red Bulls II	59	(3)
2017	New York Red Bulls	1	(0)
2018	Penn FC	23	(1)
2019–2021	Memphis 901	30	(1)

International career^{‡}
2010–2011	United States U18	8	(0)
2012	United States U20	7	(1)
2015	United States U23	8	(0)
- * Club domestic league appearances and goals as of October 5, 2020 ‡ National team caps and goals as of April 23, 2015

Daniel James Metzger (born March 9, 1993) is an American professional soccer player who plays as a midfielder.

== Career ==
=== Early career ===
Metzger was a member of the Players Development Academy for two years before joining the New York Red Bulls Academy in 2010. He also spent four years at the University of Maryland between 2011 and 2014. In his four years with the Terrapins he made 88 appearances and scored 8 goals and provided 4 assists. While at college, Metzger appeared for USL PDL club Austin Aztex during the 2013 season.

=== Professional ===
Metzger was selected with the 42nd overall pick in the 2015 MLS SuperDraft by D.C. United. He was released by the club during the preseason.

Metzger was signed by New York Red Bulls II for the 2015 season and made his debut for the club on April 4, 2015, in a 4–1 victory over Toronto FC II, the first victory in club history. On June 23, 2015, Metzger was named USL Player of the Week for his performance for NYRBII in a 2–0 victory over Louisville City FC. On April 22, 2016, Metzger scored his first goal as a professional, helping New York to a 1–0 victory over Wilmington Hammerheads FC. On August 2, 2016, Metzger recorded a goal and an assist for New York in a 5–0 rout over Harrisburg City Islanders. On October 23, 2016, Metzger helped the club to a 5–1 victory over Swope Park Rangers in the 2016 USL Cup Final.

On July 5, 2017, Metzger made his MLS debut as a late game substitute in a 3–2 victory over New England Revolution.

On February 13, 2018, Metzger joined the Penn FC of the United Soccer League.

Metzger played two seasons with USL Championship side Memphis 901 FC before leaving the club in April 2021.

=== International ===
Metzger has represented the United States at the U18, U20 and U23 level. He helped the United States to a third-place finish at the 2015 Toulon Tournament.

== Career statistics ==
As of 22 July 2017

Club	Season	League		Playoffs		US Open Cup		CONCACAF		Total	
Club	Season	Apps	Goals	Apps	Goals	Apps	Goals	Apps	Goals	Apps	Goals
New York Red Bulls II	2015	12	0	0	0	1	0	0	0	13	0
New York Red Bulls II	2016	28	3	4	0	0	0	0	0	32	3
New York Red Bulls II	2017	19	0	2	0	0	0	0	0	21	0
Career total		59	3	6	0	1	0	0	0	66	3

== Honors ==
=== Club ===
New York Red Bulls II

- USL Cup (1): 2016
