= Jordan Dover =

Canadian-Guyanese footballer (born 1994)

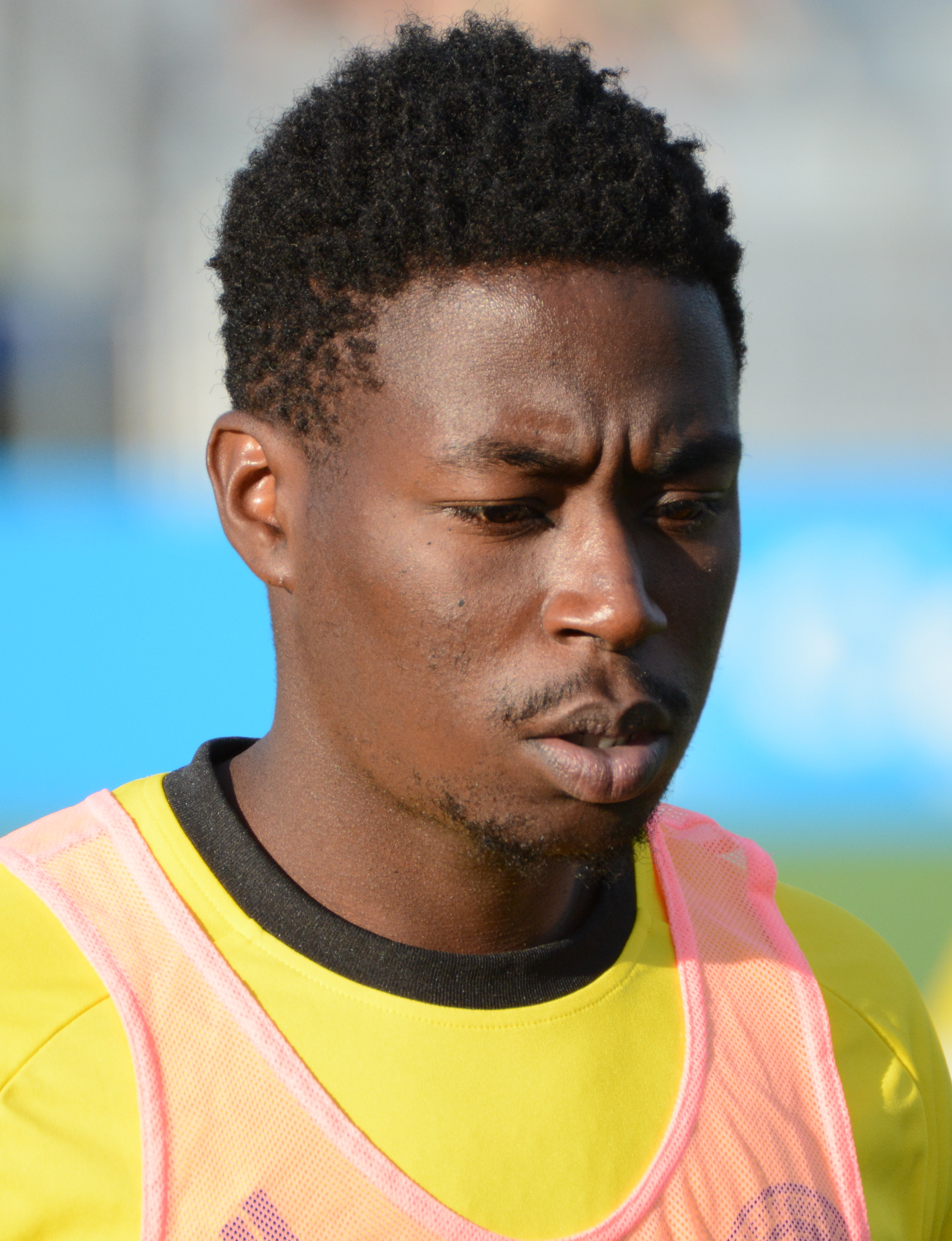
- Dover with Pittsburgh Riverhounds in 2021

Personal information
- Full name: William Emmanuel Jordan Dover
- Date of birth: December 14, 1994 (age 31)
- Place of birth: Ajax, Ontario, Canada
- Height: 1.74 m (5 ft 9 in)
- Position: Defender

Youth career
- Ajax SC

College career
| Years | Team | Apps | (Gls) |
| 2012–2015 | Green Bay Phoenix | 63 | (5) |

Senior career*
| Years | Team | Apps | (Gls) |
| 2014–2016 | Durham United | 16+ | (1+) |
| 2017 | Rochester Rhinos | 23 | (0) |
| 2018–2021 | Pittsburgh Riverhounds | 85 | (4) |
| 2022 | Simcoe County Rovers | 14 | (0) |

International career^{‡}
| 2019– | Guyana | 4 | (0) |
- * Club domestic league appearances and goals as of August 20, 2022 ‡ National team caps and goals as of February 1, 2022

William Emmanuel Jordan Dover (born December 14, 1994) is a footballer who plays as a defender. Born in Canada, he represents Guyana internationally.

== Early life ==
He played youth soccer with Ajax SC.

== College career ==
Dover played four years of college soccer at the University of Wisconsin–Green Bay between 2012 and 2015. He scored his first goal on October 6, 2012, against the Valparaiso Crusaders. He was named to the Horizon League All-Newcomer Team in 2012.

== Club career ==
From 2014 to 2016, he played with Durham United FA in League1 Ontario.

On February 15, 2017, Dover signed a professional contract with the Rochester Rhinos of the USL Championship. Dover would play one season with Rochester, before the club announced they would not play in the 2018 USL season.

On December 19, 2017, Dover signed with USL side Pittsburgh Riverhounds. He scored his first professional goal on April 21, 2018, against FC Cincinnati. He re-signed with the club for the 2020 season, with an option for 2021. He made his 100th USL appearance on June 12, 2021, against Miami FC.

After 4 years with Pittsburgh, Dover would sign with League1 Ontario club Simcoe County Rovers.

== International career ==
In May 2019, Dover was named on the Guyana national team's provisional list for the 2019 CONCACAF Gold Cup. He made the final squad on May 30. He made his debut on June 18, 2019, in the game against the United States, as a starter.
