= Joseph Greenspan =

American soccer player (born 1992)

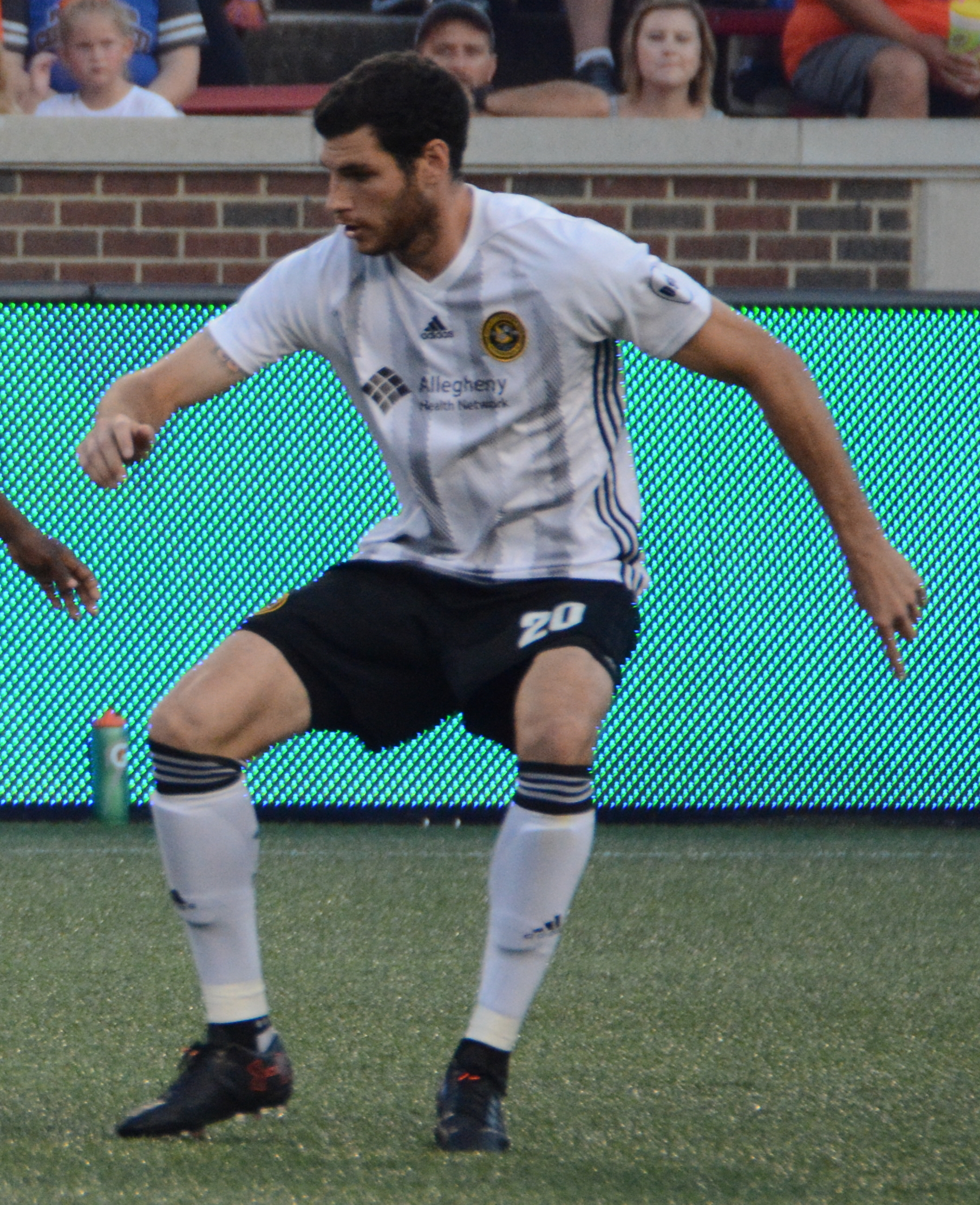
- Greenspan playing for Pittsburgh Riverhounds in 2018

Personal information
- Date of birth: September 12, 1992 (age 34)
- Place of birth: Westfield, New Jersey, United States
- Height: 6 ft 6 in (1.98 m)
- Position: Defender

Team information
- Current team: San Diego Loyal
- Number: 20

College career
Years	Team	Apps	(Gls)
2011–2014	Navy Midshipmen	78	(18)

Senior career*
Years	Team	Apps	(Gls)
2015–2016	Colorado Rapids	4	(0)
2016	→ Colorado Springs Switchbacks (loan)	4	(0)
2016	→ Charlotte Independence (loan)	7	(0)
2017	Minnesota United	3	(0)
2017	→ Pittsburgh Riverhounds (loan)	10	(0)
2018–2019	Pittsburgh Riverhounds SC	58	(7)
2020	San Diego Loyal	4	(0)
- * Club domestic league appearances and goals as of October 4, 2020

Joseph Greenspan (born September 12, 1992) is an American soccer player who plays as a defender.

== Early life and education ==
Greenspan was born in Summit, New Jersey to Brian and Andrea Greenspan, and was raised in nearby Westfield, where he graduated from Westfield High School in 2011.

== Career ==
=== College ===
Greenspan spent his entire college career at the United States Naval Academy.

=== Professional ===
Greenspan was selected in the second round (26th overall) of the 2015 MLS SuperDraft by Colorado Rapids. He initially put his soccer career on hold due to military service obligations but came to an agreement with the Navy and Rapids in June 2015, allowing him to fulfill his military requirements and play for the Rapids. Greenspan made his professional debut in a 4–1 win in a Lamar Hunt U.S. Open Cup over the Colorado Springs Switchbacks. He served a year of active duty before the Navy transferred him to the Navy Reserve, allowing him to pursue a soccer career.

Greenspan was traded to MLS expansion club Minnesota United FC following the 2016 season. He was released by Minnesota at the end of their 2017 season.

Greenspan signed for Pittsburgh Riverhounds SC on January 12, 2018.

After two-seasons with Pittsburgh, where he was named USL Championship Defender of the Year in 2019, Greenspan moved to fellow USL side San Diego Loyal SC ahead of their inaugural season in 2020. He was not included on the team's 2021 roster.
