= Raymond Lee (soccer) =

American soccer player

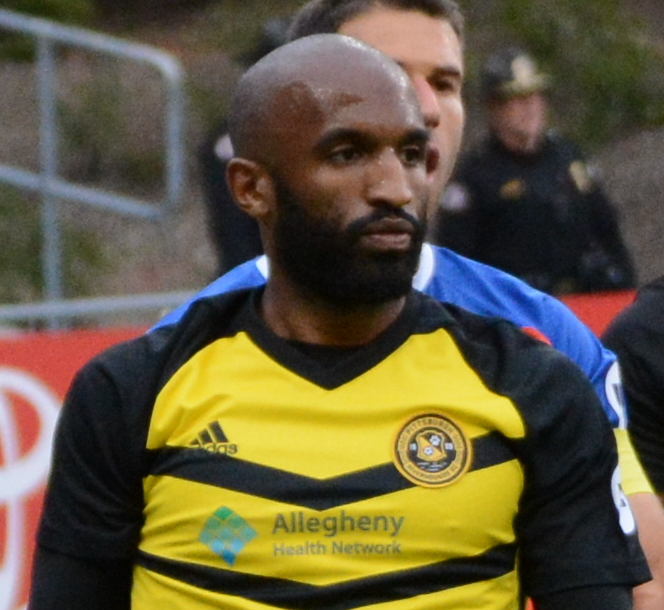
- Lee with Pittsburgh Riverhounds in 2018

Personal information
- Date of birth: April 26, 1993 (age 33)
- Place of birth: Kansas City, Missouri, United States
- Height: 5 ft 11 in (1.80 m)
- Position: Defender

Team information
- Current team: Kansas City Comets
- Number: 3

Youth career
- –2011: Sporting Kansas City

College career
Years	Team	Apps	(Gls)
2011–2014	Saint Louis Billikens	75	(12)

Senior career*
Years	Team	Apps	(Gls)
2015	Philadelphia Union	1	(0)
2015	→ Harrisburg City Islanders (loan)	2	(0)
2016	Tulsa Roughnecks	19	(0)
2017	Rochester Rhinos	14	(0)
2018	Pittsburgh Riverhounds SC	28	(0)
2018–	Kansas City Comets (indoor)	46	(27)
2019	Hartford Athletic	30	(1)
2020	Chattanooga FC	1	(0)
2020	Pittsburgh Riverhounds SC	9	(1)
- * Club domestic league appearances and goals as of December 16, 2022

Raymond Lee (born April 26, 1993) is an American professional soccer who plays as a defender for the Kansas City Comets in the Major Arena Soccer League.

Raymond Lee graduated Park Hill High School in 2011, as an All American. He went on to play left midfielder at St. Louis University, before being drafted to the MLS his junior year of college.

Raymond Lee went back to complete his bachelor's degree at Fort Hays University and graduated with a Bachelors of Science in Computer Science in May 2024.

== Career ==
=== Amateur ===
Lee played four years of college soccer at the Saint Louis University between 2011 and 2014. Prior to college, Lee played for the academy of Sporting Kansas City.

=== Professional ===
On January 20, 2015, Lee was picked 71st overall in the 2015 MLS SuperDraft by Philadelphia Union. Lee signed with Philadelphia on March 3, 2015.

Lee signed with United Soccer League side Bethlehem Steel on January 29, 2016, but was released by the club before the start of the season after falling down the depth chart at left back. He instead joined Tulsa Roughnecks on March 25.

Lee joined USL side Rochester Rhinos in March 2017.

Lee signed with USL side Pittsburgh Riverhounds SC on December 15, 2017.

On January 17, 2019, Lee joined USL Championship club Hartford Athletic.

=== Honors ===
Individual

- MASL All-Rookie First Team: 2019–20
- All-MASL Second Team: 2021
