= 2015 Toronto FC II season =

Toronto FC II
2015 season
- General Manager: Tim Bezbatchenko
- Head Coach: Jason Bent
- United Soccer League: Conference: 11th Overall: 23rd
- Top goalscorer: League: Molham Babouli (4); All: Molham Babouli (4)
- Highest home attendance: 986 (May 23 vs. Rochester Rhinos)
- Lowest home attendance: 50 (June 27 vs. Wilmington Hammerheads)
- Average home league attendance: 479
Home colours	Away colours

The 2015 Toronto FC II season was the first season in the club's history.

== Roster ==
=== Players ===
As of end of season.
The squad of Toronto FC II will be composed of an unrestricted number of first-team players on loan to the reserve team, players signed to TFC II, and TFC Academy players. Academy players who appear in matches with TFC II will retain their college eligibility.

USL contracted players
No.	Position	Nation	Player
31	FW	MEX	Sal Bernal
32	DF	USA	Wesley Charpie
33	DF	CAN	Skylar Thomas
35	FW	USA	Edwin Rivas
37	MF	CAN	Adam Bouchard
41	FW	CAN	Molham Babouli
42	MF	CAN	Massimo Mirabelli
44	MF	CAN	Mark-Anthony Kaye
45	MF	CAN	Luca Uccello
46	DF	CAN	Daniel Fabrizi
57	FW	USA	Ben Spencer (on loan from Molde)
59	DF	CAN	Emeka Ononye
61	MF	GAM	Bubacarr Jobe

First team players who have been loaned to TFC II
No.	Position	Player	Nation
1	GK	USA	Chris Konopka
5	DF	CAN	Ashtone Morgan
6	DF	USA	Nick Hagglund
14	MF	CAN	Jay Chapman
20	MF	CAN	Chris Mannella
22	FW	CAN	Jordan Hamilton
25	GK	USA	Alex Bono
34	MF	CAN	Manny Aparicio
38	DF	FRA	Clément Simonin
40	GK	CAN	Quillan Roberts

TFC Academy call-ups
No.	Position	Nation	Player
30	GK	CAN	Phil Di Bennardo
36	DF	CAN	Marcus Godinho
43	DF	CAN	Andrew Dias
47	DF	CAN	Nikola Stakic
48	MF	CAN	Raheem Edwards
49	MF	JAM	Martin Davis
50	DF	CAN	Tarik Robertson
51	DF	CAN	Robert Boskovic
52	MF	CAN	Nicholas Osorio
53	MF	CAN	Jordan Montoya
54	DF	CAN	Gabriel Boakye
56	FW	CAN	Malik Johnson
58	MF	CAN	Anthony Osorio
60	GK	CAN	Brogan Engbers
62	FW	CAN	Reshon Phillip
63	MF	CAN	Liam Fraser
64	FW	CAN	Kevin Timachy
—	FW	CAN	Rahim Thorpe
—	FW	CAN	Richie Ennin
—	DF	CAN	Steven Furlano
—	DF	CAN	Klaidi Cela

== Transfers ==
=== In ===
No.	Pos.	Player	Transferred from	Fee/notes	Date	Source
38	DF	(France) Clément Simonin	(United States) NC State Wolfpack	MLS SuperDraft 1st Round Pick (#9); Signed with the first team on March 27, 2015	March 12, 2015	
33	DF	(Canada) Skylar Thomas	(United States) Syracuse Orange	MLS SuperDraft 1st Round Pick (#11)	March 12, 2015	
32	DF	(United States) Wesley Charpie	(United States) South Florida Bulls	MLS SuperDraft 2nd Round Pick (#29)	March 12, 2015	
35	FW	(United States) Edwin Rivas	(United States) Cal State Northridge Matadors	MLS SuperDraft 2nd Round Pick (#37)	March 12, 2015	
31	FW	(Mexico) Sal Bernal	(United States) UNLV Rebels	MLS SuperDraft 4th Round Pick (#70)	March 12, 2015	
41	FW	(Canada) Molham Babouli	(Canada) TFC Academy	Academy Signing	March 12, 2015	
45	MF	(Canada) Luca Uccello	(Canada) TFC Academy	Academy Signing	March 12, 2015	
44	MF	(Canada) Mark-Anthony Kaye	(Canada) TFC Academy	Academy Signing	March 12, 2015	
46	DF	(Canada) Daniel Fabrizi	(Canada) York Lions	Free Transfer	March 20, 2015	
42	MF	(Canada) Massimo Mirabelli	(Canada) FC Edmonton	Free Transfer	March 20, 2015	
37	MF	(Canada) Adam Bouchard	(Canada) TFC Academy	Academy Signing	March 20, 2015	
43	MF	(Canada) Mark Serjeant	(United States) Grand Canyon Antelopes	Free Transfer	March 20, 2015	
39	MF	(Canada) Marcos Nunes	(Canada) TFC Academy	Academy Signing	March 27, 2015	
59	DF	(Canada) Emeka Ononye	(United States) Wright State Raiders	Free Transfer	April 29, 2015	
61	MF	(The Gambia) Bubacarr Jobe	(United States) Austin Aztex	Free Transfer	August 7, 2015	

=== Loan In ===
No.	Pos.	Player	Loaned from	Fee/notes	Date	Source
57	FW	(United States) Ben Spencer	(Norway) Molde	Loan	April 23, 2015	

=== Out ===
No.	Pos.	Player	Transferred to	Fee/notes	Date	Source
43	DF	(Canada) Mark Serjeant	(Canada) Western Ontario Mustangs	Mutually parted ways	August 18, 2015	
62	FW	(Canada) Stefan Vukovic	(Canada) Brantford Galaxy	Mutually parted ways	August 18, 2015	
39	MF	(Canada) Marcos Nunes	(Canada) Oakville Blue Devils	Mutually parted ways	September 8, 2015	

== Competitions ==
=== Preseason ===
February 19 Scrimmage	South Florida Bulls	0–2	Toronto FC II	Bradenton, Florida
12:00PM		Report	Aparicio; Bernal

February 22 Scrimmage	Florida Gulf Coast Eagles	1–2	Toronto FC II	Bradenton, Florida
			Babouli 3'; Bernal

March 6 Scrimmage	Toronto FC II	2–3	Ottawa Fury FC	Toronto
	Hamilton	Report	Paulo Jr. Misik; Foschini	Stadium: Kia Training Ground

=== USL Pro ===
==== League table ====
===== Eastern Conference =====
Pos	Team	Pld	W	D	L	GF	GA	GD	Pts
8	Harrisburg City Islanders	28	11	6	11	49	53	−4	39
9	Saint Louis FC	28	8	9	11	30	40	−10	33
10	FC Montreal	28	8	4	16	32	46	−14	28
11	Toronto FC II	28	6	5	17	26	52	−26	23
12	Wilmington Hammerheads	28	3	10	15	22	42	−20	19

Source: 2015 USL schedule
Rules for classification: 1) head-to-head; 2) total wins; 3) total goal differential; 4) total goals scored; 5) disciplinary points; 6) away goals scored; 7) away goal differential; 8) home goals scored; 9) home goal differential; 10) coin toss or drawing of lots

==== Results summary ====
Overall								Home						Away					
Pld	W	D	L	GF	GA	GD	Pts	W	D	L	GF	GA	GD	W	D	L	GF	GA	GD
28	6	5	17	26	52	−26	23	4	2	8	12	21	−9	2	3	9	14	31	−17

Last updated: September 24, 2015.
Source: USL

==== Results by round ====
Round	1	2	3	4	5	6	7	8	9	10	11	12	13	14	15	16	17	18	19	20	21	22	23	24	25	26	27	28
Ground	A	A	A	A	A	A	A	A	H	A	H	H	H	H	H	H	H	H	A	H	H	H	H	H	A	A	A	A
Result	L	W	L	D	L	L	W	L	D	D	W	L	L	L	L	W	L	L	L	W	L	L	D	W	L	L	D	L

Updated to match(es) played on September 24, 2015. Source: Regular season matches
A = Away; H = Home; W = Win; D = Draw; L = Loss

==== Matches ====
March 21	Charleston Battery	3–2	Toronto FC II	Charleston, South Carolina
7:30PM	Kelly 38'; Ferguson 56'; Prince (yellow card) 78'; Chang (yellow card) 89'; Mueller 90+1'	Report	Hamilton 8'; Babouli 16', (yellow card) 17'; Simonin (yellow card) 20'; Morgan (yellow card) 80'	Stadium: Blackbaud Stadium; Attendance: 4,536; Referee: David Erbacher

March 28	FC Montreal	0–2	Toronto FC II	Montreal, Quebec
12:30PM	Hocine (yellow card) 21'; Dinkota (yellow card) 32'; Belguendouz (yellow card) 45'; Bringolf (yellow card) 73'	Report	Nunes 38'; Serjeant (yellow card) 63'; Dinkota 71' (o.g.); Bono (yellow card) 90'	Stadium: Olympic Stadium; Attendance: 1,301; Referee: Chris Grabas

April 4	New York Red Bulls II	4–1	Toronto FC II	Harrison, New Jersey
3:30PM	Abang 8'; McLaws 40', (yellow card) 51'; Lade (yellow card) 49'; Obekop 75' (pen.); Stolz 86'	Report	Hamilton (yellow card) 14'; Nunes (yellow card) 18'; Ouimette 52' (o.g.)	Stadium: Red Bull Arena; Attendance: 1,028; Referee: Neil Barbulescu

April 19	Whitecaps FC 2	1–1	Toronto FC II	Vancouver, British Columbia
6:00PM	Clarke 33'; McKendry (yellow card) 55'; Blasco (yellow card) 64' (yellow-red card) 68'	Report	Kaye (red card) 77'; Chapman 57'; Babouli (yellow card) 63'	Stadium: Thunderbird Stadium; Attendance: 3,208; Referee: Alain Ruch

April 25	Pittsburgh Riverhounds	5–1	Toronto FC II	Pittsburgh, Pennsylvania
7:00PM	Kerr 41' (pen.); Vincent 56', 68'; Earles 72'; Pasher 90'	Report	Babouli 17'; Robertson (red card) 41'	Stadium: Highmark Stadium; Attendance: 1,661; Referee: Matthew Kreitzer

May 9	Rochester Rhinos	1–0	Toronto FC II	Rochester, New York
7:05PM	Van De Casteele (yellow card) 58'; Duba 90+2'	Report	Edwards (yellow card) 49'; Babouli (yellow card) 88' (yellow-red card) 90'	Stadium: Sahlen's Stadium; Attendance: 5,179; Referee: David Mon

May 14	Saint Louis FC	1–2	Toronto FC II	Fenton, Missouri
8:00PM	Gaul 1'; Musa (yellow card) 90'	Report	Rivas 9'; Mirabelli 38'; Uccello (yellow card) 77'; Nunes (yellow card) 89'	Stadium: St. Louis Soccer Park; Attendance: 4,004; Referee: Elvis Mahmutovic

May 16	Louisville City FC	4–0	Toronto FC II	Louisville, Kentucky
7:30PM	Dacres 7'; Fondy 15'; Shanosky 36'; Fondy 56'	Report		Stadium: Louisville Slugger Field; Attendance: 6,090; Referee: James Dumstorf

May 23	Toronto FC II	0–0	Rochester Rhinos	Toronto
8:00PM		Report	Garzi (yellow card) 70'	Stadium: BMO Field; Attendance: 986

June 6	Harrisburg City Islanders	0–0	Toronto FC II	Harrisburg, Pennsylvania
7:00PM	Ekra (yellow card) 66'; Tribbett (yellow card) 72'	Report	Aparicio (yellow card) 41'; Edwards (yellow card) 80'; Fraser (yellow card) 87'	Stadium: Skyline Sports Complex; Attendance: 2,640; Referee: Ryan Dusreis

June 27	Toronto FC II	1–0	Wilmington Hammerheads	Toronto
8:00PM	Hamilton 45+2', (yellow card) 71'	Report	Cole (yellow card) 14'	Stadium: BMO Field; Attendance: 50; Referee: Marie-Soleil Beaudoi

July 8	Toronto FC II	0–2	Pittsburgh Riverhounds	Vaughan, Ontario
8:00PM		Report	Kerr 9'; Earls (yellow card) 30'; Russell (yellow card) 82'; Arena 90+'	Stadium: Ontario Soccer Centre; Attendance: 867; Referee: Justin Tasev

July 11	Toronto FC II	0–2	Rochester Rhinos	Vaughan, Ontario
3:00PM		Report	Duba 55', (yellow card) 63'; Mendoza 57'; Volesky 90'	Stadium: Ontario Soccer Centre; Attendance: 565; Referee: Alexis Vaughan

July 18	Toronto FC II	0–1	Saint Louis FC	Vaughan, Ontario
8:00PM	Godinho (yellow card) 56'; Mirabelli (yellow card) 75'	Report	Barklage (yellow card) 29'; Godinho 39' (o.g.); Ambersley (yellow card) 51'; Gaul (yellow card) 57'	Stadium: Ontario Soccer Centre; Attendance: 552; Referee: Geoff Gamble

July 21	Toronto FC II	0–1	FC Montreal	Vaughan, Ontario
8:00PM	Osorio (yellow card) 88'	Report	Messoudi 55'; Belguendouz (yellow card) 83'	Stadium: Ontario Soccer Centre; Attendance: 347

July 24	Toronto FC II	1–0	Charleston Battery	Vaughan, Ontario
8:00PM	Bouchard (yellow card) 21'; Fabrizi (yellow card) 76'; Thomas 89'	Report	Prince (yellow card) 58' vanSchaik (yellow card) 88'	Stadium: Ontario Soccer Centre; Attendance: 468; Referee: Pierre Acouri

August 1	Toronto FC II	2–3	Louisville City FC	Vaughan, Ontario
3:00PM	Babouli 21'; Roberts (yellow card) 68'; Hamilton 81'	Report	Quinn (yellow card) 33'; Dacres 58'; McCabe 67'; Burke 73'; Guzman (yellow card) 90'	Stadium: Ontario Soccer Centre; Attendance: 303; Referee: Alexis Vaughan

August 8	Toronto FC II	1–3	Pittsburgh Riverhounds	Vaughan, Ontario
8:00PM	Kaye (yellow card) 82'; Edwards 90+2'	Report	Vincent 11'; Moloto 30'; Dallman (yellow card) 66'; Čabrilo (yellow card) 74', (goal) 79'	Stadium: Ontario Soccer Centre; Referee: Geoff Gamble

August 12	FC Montreal	2–1	Toronto FC II	Montreal, Quebec
12:30PM	Gagnon-Laparé 8' (pen.); Béland-Goyette (yellow card) 13'; Haman 53'; Bringolf (yellow card) 56'; Dominguez (yellow card) 81'	Report	Ononye (yellow card) 7'; Babouli (yellow card) 77'; Mannella 90+1'	Stadium: Stade Saputo Turf Field; Attendance: 207

August 15	Toronto FC II	2–1	Richmond Kickers	Vaughan, Ontario
3:00PM	Mannella (yellow card) 67'; Babouli 75', (yellow card) 90+3'; Mirabelli 90+2'	Report	Imura 55'	Stadium: Ontario Soccer Centre; Attendance: 426; Referee: Yusri Rudolf

August 19	Toronto FC II	0–2	Harrisburg City Islanders	Vaughan, Ontario
8:00PM	Jobe (yellow card) 45'; Mirabelli (yellow card) 65'	Report	Foster 26'; Shaffer (yellow card) 35'; Jankouskas 50'; Noble (yellow card) 73'; Pettis (yellow card) 79'; Leverock (yellow card) 84'	Stadium: Ontario Soccer Centre; Attendance: 362; Referee: David Barrie

August 22	Toronto FC II	0–2	New York Red Bulls II	Vaughan, Ontario
8:00PM	Bouchard (yellow card) 68' (yellow-red card) 80'; Thomas (yellow card) 90'	Report	Bonomo 47' da Fonte (yellow card) 72'; Castaño (yellow card) 73'; Williams 78'	Stadium: Ontario Soccer Centre; Attendance: 602; Referee: Alexis Vaughan

August 30	Toronto FC II	2–2	Charlotte Independence	Vaughan, Ontario
3:00PM	Slogic 14' (o.g.); Chapman 58'	Report	Slogic 16'; Finley 88' (pen.)	Stadium: Ontario Soccer Centre; Attendance: 327; Referee: Justin Tasev

September 5	Toronto FC II	3–2	FC Montreal	Vaughan, Ontario
3:00PM	Phillip 4', 50'; Thomas 28'; Babouli (yellow card) 90'	Report	Charpie 1' (o.g.); Béland-Goyette (yellow card) 12'; Haman (yellow card) 54'; Lajoie-Gravelle 88'; Yoseke (yellow card) 90'	Stadium: Ontario Soccer Centre; Attendance: 378; Referee: David Barrie

September 9	Charlotte Independence	4–1	Toronto FC II	Charlotte, North Carolina
7:30PM	Zahorski 23'; Cox (yellow card) 32'; Slogic (yellow card) 42'; Alvarez (yellow card) 49'; Finley 62', 89'; Thompson 64'	Report	Osorio (yellow card) 38'; Edwards 51'; Thomas (yellow card) 56'	Stadium: Ramblewood Soccer Stadium; Attendance: 1874; Referee: Aleksandar Zhelyazkov

September 16	Richmond Kickers	2–1	Toronto FC II	Richmond, Virginia
7:00PM	Yeisley 29'; Davis IV 51'; Callahan (yellow card) 72'	Report	Uccello 35'	Stadium: City Stadium; Attendance: 3,923; Referee: Danielle Chesky

September 19	Wilmington Hammerheads	2–2	Toronto FC II	Wilmington, North Carolina
7:00PM	Wheeler 13', 37'; Bone (yellow card) 73'; Campbell (yellow card) 88'	Report	Bernal 45', 55'; Mirabelli (yellow card) 90'	Stadium: Legion Stadium; Attendance: 3,243; Referee: Rubiel Vazquez

September 24	Rochester Rhinos	2–0	Toronto FC II	Rochester, New York
7:05PM	Rolfe 69'; Samuels 85'	Report		Stadium: Sahlen's Stadium; Attendance: 5,612; Referee: Jaroslaw Werel

=== Mid-season friendlies ===
July 28	Toronto FC (Canada)	2–2 (3–5 p)	(Italy) A.S. Roma Primavera	Vaughan, Ontario
8:00PM	Edwards 45+1'; Nunes 80'	Report	Soleri 45', (yellow card) 90+4'; Borg 85'	Stadium: Ontario Soccer Centre; Attendance: 1,017
	Penalties
	Babouli (penalty missed); Nunes (penalty scored); Hamilton (penalty scored); Fraser (penalty scored)		Marchizza (penalty scored); Di Mariano (penalty scored); Bordin (penalty scored); D'Alena (penalty scored); Paolelli (penalty scored)

== Statistics ==
=== Squad and statistics ===
As of September 24, 2015

No.	Pos	Nat	Player	Total		United Soccer League	
No.	Pos	Nat	Player	Apps	Goals	Apps	Goals
1	GK	(United States) USA	Chris Konopka	1	0	1+0	0
5	DF	(Canada) CAN	Ashtone Morgan	1	0	1+0	0
6	DF	(United States) USA	Nick Hagglund	1	0	0+1	0
14	MF	(Canada) CAN	Jay Chapman	9	2	9+0	2
20	MF	(Canada) CAN	Chris Mannella	16	1	15+1	1
22	FW	(Canada) CAN	Jordan Hamilton	20	3	15+5	3
25	GK	(United States) USA	Alex Bono	12	0	10+2	0
30	GK	(Canada) CAN	Phil Di Bennardo	2	0	2+0	0
31	FW	(Mexico) MEX	Sal Bernal	12	2	8+4	2
32	DF	(United States) USA	Wesley Charpie	21	0	17+4	0
33	DF	(Canada) CAN	Skylar Thomas	22	2	20+2	2
34	MF	(Canada) CAN	Manny Aparicio	20	0	13+7	0
35	FW	(United States) USA	Edwin Rivas	18	1	9+9	1
36	DF	(Canada) CAN	Marcus Godinho	7	0	4+3	0
37	MF	(Canada) CAN	Adam Bouchard	15	0	11+4	0
38	DF	(France) FRA	Clément Simonin	4	0	3+1	0
39	MF	(Canada) CAN	Marcos Nunes	14	1	9+5	1
40	GK	(Canada) CAN	Quillan Roberts	15	0	15+0	0
41	FW	(Canada) CAN	Molham Babouli	20	4	18+2	4
42	MF	(Canada) CAN	Massimo Mirabelli	24	2	14+10	2
43	DF	(Canada) CAN	Andrew Dias	2	0	1+1	0
44	MF	(Canada) CAN	Mark-Anthony Kaye	22	0	19+3	0
45	MF	(Canada) CAN	Luca Uccello	22	1	16+6	1
46	DF	(Canada) CAN	Daniel Fabrizi	17	0	11+6	0
48	MF	(Canada) CAN	Raheem Edwards	21	1	13+8	1
49	MF	(Jamaica) JAM	Martin Davis	2	0	1+1	0
50	DF	(Canada) CAN	Tarik Robertson	1	0	1+0	0
51	DF	(Canada) CAN	Robert Boskovic	3	0	1+2	0
52	MF	(Canada) CAN	Nicholas Osorio	2	0	0+2	0
54	DF	(Canada) CAN	Gabriel Boakye	9	0	7+2	0
56	FW	(Canada) CAN	Malik Johnson	7	0	5+2	0
57	FW	(United States) USA	Ben Spencer	0	0	0+0	0
58	MF	(Canada) CAN	Anthony Osorio	19	0	10+9	0
59	DF	(Canada) CAN	Emeka Ononye	13	0	11+2	0
61	MF	(The Gambia) GAM	Bubacarr Jobe	5	0	4+1	0
62	FW	(Canada) CAN	Reshon Phillip	4	2	2+2	2
63	MF	(Canada) CAN	Liam Fraser	10	0	7+3	0
64	FW	(Canada) CAN	Kevin Timachy	5	0	0+5	0
	DF	(Canada) CAN	Mateo Restrepo	1	0	0+1	0
	FW	(Canada) CAN	Rahim Thorpe	1	0	0+1	0
	DF	(Canada) CAN	Klaidi Cela	1	0	0+1	0
	FW	(Canada) CAN	Richie Ennin	1	0	0+1	0
Players who appeared for Toronto but left during the season:
43	MF	(Canada) CAN	Mark Serjeant	4	0	4+0	0
62	FW	(Canada) CAN	Stefan Vukovic	6	0	1+5	0

=== Goals and assists ===
Correct as of September 24, 2015

Goals
Pos.	Playing Pos.	Nation	Name	United Soccer League	Total
1	FW	(Canada)	Molham Babouli	4	4
2	FW	(Canada)	Jordan Hamilton	3	3
3	FW	(Mexico)	Sal Bernal	2	2
3	MF	(Canada)	Jay Chapman	2	2
3	MF	(Canada)	Raheem Edwards	2	2
3	MF	(Canada)	Massimo Mirabelli	2	2
3	FW	(Canada)	Reshon Phillip	2	2
3	DF	(Canada)	Skylar Thomas	2	2
9	MF	(Canada)	Chris Mannella	1	1
9	MF	(Canada)	Marcos Nunes	1	1
9	FW	(United States)	Edwin Rivas	1	1
9	MF	(Canada)	Luca Uccello	1	1
Total				23	23

Assists
Pos.	Playing Pos.	Nation	Name	United Soccer League	Total
1	FW	(Canada)	Molham Babouli	4	4
2	MF	(Canada)	Raheem Edwards	2	2
2	MF	(Canada)	Anthony Osorio	2	2
4	MF	(Canada)	Jay Chapman	1	1
4	DF	(United States)	Wesley Charpie	1	1
4	FW	(United States)	Edwin Rivas	1	1
4	DF	(France)	Clément Simonin	1	1
4	DF	(Canada)	Skylar Thomas	1	1
4	MF	(Canada)	Luca Uccello	1	1
Total				14	14

=== Clean sheets ===
Includes all competitive matches. Correct as of September 24, 2015

R	Pos	Nat	Name	United Soccer League	Total
1	GK	(Canada)	Quillan Roberts	4	4
2	GK	(United States)	Alex Bono	1	1
			TOTALS	5	5

=== Disciplinary record ===
Correct as of September 24, 2015

No.	Pos.	Name	United Soccer League		Total	
No.	Pos.	Name	Booked	Sent off (straight red)	Booked	Sent off (straight red)
5	DF	(Canada) Ashtone Morgan	1	0	1	0
20	MF	(Canada) Chris Mannella	1	0	1	0
22	FW	(Canada) Jordan Hamilton	2	0	2	0
25	GK	(United States) Alex Bono	1	0	1	0
38	DF	(Canada) Skylar Thomas	2	0	2	0
34	MF	(Canada) Manny Aparicio	1	0	1	0
36	DF	(Canada) Marcus Godinho	1	0	1	0
37	DF	(Canada) Adam Bouchard	3	1	3	1
38	DF	(France) Clément Simonin	1	0	1	0
39	MF	(Canada) Marcos Nunes	2	0	2	0
40	GK	(Canada) Quillan Roberts	1	0	1	0
41	FW	(Canada) Molham Babouli	7	1	7	1
42	MF	(Canada) Massimo Mirabelli	3	0	3	0
43	MF	(Canada) Mark Serjeant	1	0	1	0
44	MF	(Canada) Mark-Anthony Kaye	3	1	3	1
45	MF	(Canada) Luca Uccello	1	0	1	0
46	DF	(Canada) Daniel Fabrizi	1	0	1	0
48	MF	(Canada) Raheem Edwards	2	0	2	0
50	DF	(Canada) Tarik Robertson	0	1	0	1
58	MF	(Canada) Anthony Osorio	2	0	2	0
59	DF	(Canada) Emeka Ononye	1	0	1	0
61	MF	(The Gambia) Bubacarr Jobe	1	0	1	0
63	MF	(Canada) Liam Fraser	1	0	1	0
Total			38	4	38	4

== Recognition ==
=== USL Team of the Week ===
Week	Players	Bench	Opponent	Link
1	(Canada) Molham Babouli	(Canada) Jordan Hamilton	Charleston Battery	
2		(Canada) Molham Babouli	FC Montreal	
5		(Canada) Jay Chapman	Whitecaps FC 2	
10	(Canada) Skylar Thomas		Rochester Rhinos	
12	(Canada) Quillan Roberts		Harrisburg City Islanders	
15		(Canada) Quillan Roberts	Wilmington Hammerheads	
19	(Canada) Quillan Roberts		Charleston Battery	
22	(Canada) Massimo Mirabelli		Richmond Kickers	
25	(Canada) Reshon Phillip		FC Montreal	
