= 2016 Toronto FC II season =

Toronto FC II
2016 season
- General Manager: Tim Bezbatchenko
- Head Coach: Jason Bent
- United Soccer League: Conference:12th; Overall:26th
- Top goalscorer: League: Raheem Edwards (6); All: Raheem Edwards (6)
Home colours	Away colours

The 2016 Toronto FC II season was the second season in the club's history. In 2015 the team finished 11th in the Eastern Conference, therefore, missing the playoffs.

== Roster ==
=== Players ===
As of the end of season.
The squad of Toronto FC II will be composed of an unrestricted number of first-team players on loan to the reserve team, players signed to TFC II, and TFC Academy players. Academy players who appear in matches with TFC II will retain their college eligibility.

USL contracted players
No.	Position	Nation	Player
31	FW	MEX	Sal Bernal
32	DF	USA	Wesley Charpie
34	DF	CAN	Skylar Thomas
36	MF	USA	Brian James
37	DF	CAN	Adam Bouchard
42	DF	USA	Mitchell Taintor
44	DF	TRI	Triston Hodge (on loan from W Connection)
45	MF	CAN	Luca Uccello
46	FW	USA	Ben Spencer
48	MF	CAN	Raheem Edwards
49	MF	JAM	Martin Davis
51	FW	TRI	Ricardo John
55	MF	CAN	Aidan Daniels
56	FW	CAN	Malik Johnson
58	DF	CAN	Anthony Osorio
61	MF	GAM	Bubacarr Jobe
63	MF	CAN	Liam Fraser
64	FW	CAN	Shaan Hundal
92	GK	CAN	Nathan Ingham (on loan from FC Edmonton)

First team players who have been loaned to TFC II
No.	Position	Nation	Player
1	GK	USA	Clint Irwin
5	DF	CAN	Ashtone Morgan
6	DF	USA	Nick Hagglund
11	FW	CAN	Molham Babouli
13	DF	FRA	Clément Simonin
14	MF	CAN	Jay Chapman
15	DF	USA	Eriq Zavaleta
19	MF	USA	Daniel Lovitz
20	MF	CAN	Chris Mannella
22	FW	CAN	Jordan Hamilton
25	GK	USA	Alex Bono
28	DF	USA	Mark Bloom
40	GK	CAN	Quillan Roberts

TFC Academy call-ups
No.	Position	Nation	Player
30	GK	CAN	Phil Di Bennardo
35	DF	CAN	Leonard Sohn
38	MF	JPN	Kota Sakurai
43	DF	CAN	Andrew Dias
47	DF	CAN	Rocco Romeo
50	FW	CAN	Richie Ennin
53	DF	CAN	Steven Furlano
54	MF	CAN	Ethan Beckford
59	DF	CAN	Jacob Maurutto
62	FW	CAN	Reshon Phillip
65	MF	CAN	Marko Maletic
67	MF	CAN	Dante Campbell
70	GK	CAN	Gianluca Catalano
80	GK	CAN	Angelo Cavalluzzo
—	FW	USA	Ayo Akinola
—	DF	CAN	Robert Boskovic
—	DF	CAN	Nikola Stakic

== Transfers ==
=== In ===
No.	Pos.	Player	Transferred from	Fee/notes	Date	Source
58	DF	(Canada) Anthony Osorio	(Canada) TFC Academy	Academy Signing	December 9, 2015	
56	FW	(Canada) Malik Johnson	(Canada) TFC Academy	Academy Signing	January 5, 2016	
49	MF	(Jamaica) Martin Davis	(Canada) TFC Academy	Academy Signing	February 3, 2016	
63	MF	(Canada) Liam Fraser	(Canada) TFC Academy	Academy Signing	February 10, 2016	
42	DF	(United States) Mitchell Taintor	(United States) Rutgers Scarlet Knights	Selected by Toronto FC in the 3rd Round of the 2016 MLS SuperDraft	March 15, 2016	
36	MF	(United States) Brian James	(United States) Penn State Nittany Lions	Selected by Toronto FC in the 4th Round of the 2016 MLS SuperDraft	March 24, 2016	
55	MF	(Canada) Aidan Daniels	(Canada) TFC Academy	Academy Signing	July 8, 2016	
51	FW	(Trinidad and Tobago) Ricardo John	(Trinidad and Tobago) Central F.C.	Free transfer	August 4, 2016	
64	FW	(Canada) Shaan Hundal	(Canada) TFC Academy	Academy Signing	September 1, 2016	
46	FW	(United States) Ben Spencer	(Norway) Molde	Free Transfer	September 8, 2016	

=== Loan In ===
No.	Pos.	Player	Loaned from	Fee/notes	Date	Source
92	GK	(Canada) Nathan Ingham	(Canada) FC Edmonton	Loan	August 5, 2016	
44	DF	(Trinidad and Tobago) Triston Hodge	(Trinidad and Tobago) W Connection	Loan	August 5, 2016	

=== Out ===
No.	Pos.	Player	Transferred to	Fee/notes	Date	Source
46	DF	(Canada) Daniel Fabrizi		Contract Expired	December 9, 2015	
59	DF	(Canada) Emeka Ononye		Contract Expired	December 9, 2015	
44	MF	(Canada) Mark-Anthony Kaye	(United States) Louisville City FC	Contract Expired	December 9, 2015	
42	MF	(Canada) Massimo Mirabelli	(Canada) Vaughan Azzurri	Contract Expired	December 9, 2015	
35	FW	(United States) Edwin Rivas		Contract Expired	December 9, 2015	
41	FW	(Canada) Molham Babouli	(Canada) Toronto FC	Promoted to first team	March 5, 2016	

== Competitions ==
=== Preseason ===
February 20	Toronto FC II	2–0	Vaughan Azzurri	Toronto, Ontario
1:00PM	Uccello; Dias	Report		Stadium: Kia Training Grounds

February 26	Toronto FC II	1–2	Ottawa Fury	Toronto, Ontario
3:00PM	Bernal 85'	Report	Bruna 30' (pen.); Chin 90'	Stadium: Kia Training Grounds

March 4	Simon Fraser Clan	0–0	Toronto FC II	Burnaby, British Columbia
10:00PM		Report		Stadium: Terry Fox Field

March 6	Whitecaps FC 2	1–1	Toronto FC II	Burnaby, British Columbia
1:30PM	Haber	Report	Madison	Stadium: Terry Fox Field

March 9	Seattle Sounders FC 2	0–1	Toronto FC II	Tukwila, Washington
9:00PM		Report	Madison	Stadium: Starfire Sportsplex

March 19	Toronto FC II	1–0	Rochester Rhinos	Toronto, Ontario
3:00PM	Thomas 28'			Stadium: Kia Training Grounds

=== USL Pro ===
==== League table ====
===== Eastern Conference =====
Pos	Team	Pld	W	D	L	GF	GA	GD	Pts
10	Harrisburg City Islanders	30	8	7	15	37	54	−17	31
11	Bethlehem Steel FC	30	6	10	14	32	43	−11	28
12	Toronto FC II	30	7	5	18	36	58	−22	26
13	Pittsburgh Riverhounds	30	6	7	17	31	50	−19	25
14	FC Montreal	30	7	2	21	35	57	−22	23

Source: 2016 USL Standings
Rules for classification: 1) total wins; 2) total goal differential; 3) total goals scored; 4) points earned against top four Conference finishers; 5) disciplinary points; 6) coin toss or drawing of lots

==== Results summary ====
Overall								Home						Away					
Pld	W	D	L	GF	GA	GD	Pts	W	D	L	GF	GA	GD	W	D	L	GF	GA	GD
30	7	5	18	36	58	−22	26	4	3	8	18	27	−9	3	2	10	18	31	−13

Last updated: September 24, 2016.
Source: USL

==== Results by round ====
Round	1	2	3	4	5	6	7	8	9	10	11	12	13	14	15	16	17	18	19	20	21	22	23	24	25	26	27	28	29	30
Ground	A	A	H	H	A	H	H	A	A	A	H	A	H	H	A	A	H	A	H	A	H	A	A	A	H	H	H	H	H	A
Result	D	W	D	L	L	L	W	L	L	L	L	D	W	D	L	L	L	L	W	W	D	L	W	L	L	L	L	L	W	L

Updated to match(es) played on September 24, 2016. Source: Regular season matches
A = Away; H = Home; W = Win; D = Draw; L = Loss

==== Matches ====
March 26	New York Red Bulls II	2–2	Toronto FC II	Harrison, New Jersey
3:00PM	Powder (yellow card) 38'; Allen 66', 69'; Bonomo (yellow card) 88'	Report	Edwards 35'; Thomas 45+1'; Osorio (yellow card) 66'	Stadium: Red Bull Arena; Attendance: 374; Referee: Mark Allatin

April 9	FC Montreal	1–2	Toronto FC II	Montreal, Quebec
7:30PM	Béland-Goyette (yellow card) 38'; Fisher (yellow card) 73'; Tabla 80'; Choinière (yellow card) 90+3'	Report	Daniels (yellow card) 61'; Johnson 63'; Osorio (yellow card) 77'; Edwards 84'	Stadium: Olympic Stadium

April 17	Toronto FC II	2–2	Pittsburgh Riverhounds	Vaughan, Ontario
4:00PM	Hagglund 12'; Edwards 56' (pen.), (yellow card) 84'; Boskovic (yellow card) 90+1'	Report	Hunt (yellow card) 11'; Parkes 41'; Swanson (yellow card) 75'; Branson 90+2'	Stadium: Ontario Soccer Centre; Attendance: 1,200; Referee: Yusri Rudolf

April 24	Toronto FC II	1–2	FC Cincinnati	Vaughan, Ontario
4:00PM	Edwards 45+1'	Report	Wiedeman 60'; Cummings 84'	Stadium: Ontario Soccer Centre; Referee: David Barrie

April 30	Richmond Kickers	1–0	Toronto FC II	Richmond, Virginia
5:00PM	Ownby 9'; Callahan (yellow card) 47'	Report	Taintor (yellow card) 60'	Stadium: City Stadium; Attendance: 3,655; Referee: Mark Gorak

May 4	Toronto FC II	0–2	Louisville City FC	Vaughan, Ontario
7:30PM	Edwards (yellow card) 69'; Bloom (yellow card) 86'	Report	Shanosky 5'; McCabe 65'; Kaye (yellow card) 66'	Stadium: Ontario Soccer Centre; Attendance: 672; Referee: Alexis Vaughan

May 11	Toronto FC II	1–0	Richmond Kickers	Vaughan, Ontario
11:30AM	Hamilton (yellow card) 39'; Bernal 75'; Bouchard (yellow card) 83'	Report		Stadium: Ontario Soccer Centre; Attendance: 1,222; Referee: Yusri Rudolf

May 14	Charleston Battery	2–0	Toronto FC II	Charleston, South Carolina
7:30PM	Williams 10'; Chang 48'	Report	Taintor (yellow card) 22'; Boskovic (yellow card) 40'; Hundal (yellow card) 59'	Stadium: MUSC Health Stadium; Attendance: 5,481; Referee: Greg Dopka

May 21	Pittsburgh Riverhounds	2–1	Toronto FC II	Pittsburgh, Pennsylvania
7:00PM	Murrell (yellow card) 56'; Moloto 68'; Hertzog 72'	Report	Johnson 83'	Stadium: Highmark Stadium; Attendance: 1,209; Referee: Patrick Rosas

May 24	Harrisburg City Islanders	2–1	Toronto FC II	Lancaster, Pennsylvania
7:00PM	Wilson 26'; Wheeler 29'; Bolduc (yellow card) 86'	Report	Osorio (yellow card) 7'; James (yellow card) 42', (goal) 90+3'	Stadium: Clipper Magazine Stadium; Attendance: 1,531; Referee: Matthew Franz

May 29	Toronto FC II	1–3	Wilmington Hammerheads	Vaughan, Ontario
7:30PM	Hundal 23'; Thomas (yellow card) 30' (yellow-red card) 60'; Taintor (yellow card) 90'	Report	Perone 30' (pen.); Taublieb (yellow card) 65'; Corboz 83'; Barnes-Homer 90'	Stadium: Ontario Soccer Centre; Referee: Pierre Acouri

June 4	Charlotte Independence	2–2	Toronto FC II	Charlotte, North Carolina
7:00PM	Castillo (yellow card) 31'; Herrera 47', 56'; Brown (yellow card) 61'	Report	Hundal 19'; Johnson 36' (pen.); James (yellow card) 67'	Stadium: Ramblewood Soccer Stadium; Attendance: 1,801; Referee: Brandon Artis
Note: Match ended in 73rd minute due to weather.

June 11	Toronto FC II	2–1	Rochester Rhinos	Vaughan, Ontario
7:30PM	Hundal (yellow card) 34'; Osorio (yellow card) 54'; Uccello 77'; Simonin (yellow card) 89'; Johnson 90+1'	Report	Apostolopoulos (yellow card) 68'; Farrell 90+2'	Stadium: Ontario Soccer Centre; Attendance: 1,262; Referee: Carol Anne Chenard

June 15	Toronto FC II	1–1	FC Montreal	Vaughan, Ontario
11:30AM	Jobe (yellow card) 50' (yellow-red card) 82'; Thomas (yellow card) 68'; Osorio (yellow card) 71'; Fraser 90'	Report	Jackson-Hamel 55'; Choinière (yellow card) 83'	Stadium: Ontario Soccer Centre; Attendance: 1,228; Referee: Marie-Soleil Beaudoin

June 18	FC Cincinnati	2–1	Toronto FC II	Cincinnati, Ohio
7:00PM	Okoli (yellow card) 57'; Delbridge 61'; Stevenson 63'	Report	Edwards 4'	Stadium: Nippert Stadium; Attendance: 19,112; Referee: Guido Gonzales Jr.

June 21	Louisville City FC	4–1	Toronto FC II	Louisville, Kentucky
7:30PM	Abend 11', 24'; McCabe 26'; Morad 65'	Report	Daniels (yellow card) 29'; Furlano (yellow card) 64'; Hundal 79'	Stadium: Louisville Slugger Field; Attendance: 7,066; Referee: Rosendo Mendoza

June 26	Toronto FC II	0–1	Charleston Battery	Vaughan, Ontario
7:30PM	Thomas (yellow card) 70' (yellow-red card) 90+3'; Daniels (yellow card) 74'	Report	Ferguson (yellow card) 70'; Williams 79'; Garbanzo (yellow card) 89'	Stadium: Ontario Soccer Centre; Attendance: 1,069; Referee: Yusri Rudolph

July 2	Wilmington Hammerheads	3–0	Toronto FC II	Wilmington, North Carolina
7:00PM	Townsend 14'; Martz 39'; Miller 46'; Fairclough (yellow card) 83'	Report		Stadium: Legion Stadium; Attendance: 3,837; Referee: Rubiel Vazquez

July 6	Toronto FC II	3–2	Bethlehem Steel FC	Vaughan, Ontario
7:30PM	Uccello 2'; Jobe 13', (yellow card) 90+1'; Fraser 63'	Report	Richter 39'; Heard 66'; Taylor-Parkes (yellow card) 82'	Stadium: Ontario Soccer Centre; Attendance: 1,064; Referee: Justin Tasev

July 10	Harrisburg City Islanders	2–4	Toronto FC II	Lancaster, Pennsylvania
6:00PM	Pettis 58', (yellow card) 63'; Barril 68'	Report	Edwards 35'; Akinola 48', 49'; Mannella (yellow card) 63'; Daniels 86'	Stadium: Skyline Sports Complex; Attendance: 1,503; Referee: Jorge Ramirez

July 20	Toronto FC II	1–1	Rochester Rhinos	Vaughan, Ontario
7:30PM	Osorio (yellow card) 31'; Thomas 77'	Report	Volesky 27'	Stadium: Ontario Soccer Centre; Attendance: 1,072; Referee: Yusri Rudolph

July 23	Richmond Kickers	3–0	Toronto FC II	Richmond, Virginia
7:00PM	Aguilar 11'; Imura 49' (pen.) 70'; Sekyere (yellow card) 59'	Report		Stadium: City Stadium; Attendance: 4,179; Referee: Guido Gonzales Jr.

July 31	Bethlehem Steel FC	2–3	Toronto FC II	Bethlehem, Pennsylvania
4:00PM	Bibbs 49'; Heard (yellow card) 53'; Richter 81'; Brown (yellow card) 85'	Report	Hundal 17', 60'; Edwards (yellow card) 31'; Bernal (yellow card) 46'; Uccello 78'; Charpie (red card) 80'	Stadium: Goodman Stadium; Attendance: 2,176; Referee: Jaime Herrera

August 6	Orlando City B	2–1	Toronto FC II	Melbourne, Florida
7:30PM	Redding (yellow card) 24'; Neal 57'; Callan-McFadden (yellow card) 68'; Cox 90+1'	Report	Osorio (yellow card) 48'; Edwards (yellow card) 54'; Taintor 90'	Stadium: Titan Soccer Complex; Attendance: 745; Referee: Jonathan Weiner

August 14	Toronto FC II	0–1	Harrisburg City Islanders	Vaughan, Ontario
7:30PM	James (yellow card) 87'	Report	Hughes (yellow card) 66'; Barril 68'	Stadium: Ontario Soccer Centre; Referee: Michelle Pye

August 24	Toronto FC II	0–1	New York Red Bulls II	Vaughan, Ontario
5:00PM	Maletic (yellow card) 44'; Uccello (yellow card) 59'	Report	Flemmings 64'	Stadium: Ontario Soccer Centre; Attendance: 1,081; Referee: Justin Tasev

August 28	Toronto FC II	3–4	FC Montreal	Vaughan, Ontario
4:00PM	Davis 5'; John 10', 63'; Simonin (yellow card) 37'; James (yellow card) 39'; Taintor (red card) 90+4'; Ingham (yellow card) 90+5'; Mannella (yellow card) 90+5'	Report	Béland-Goyette 6'; Jackson-Hamel 43'; Riggi 45'; Jarras 86'; Dominguez (red card) 90+4'	Stadium: Ontario Soccer Centre; Referee: Pierre Acouri

September 4	Toronto FC II	1–5	Charlotte Independence	Vaughan, Ontario
4:00PM	James 58'	Report	Slogic 4', (yellow card) 90+1'; Herrera (yellow card) 14'; Martinez 39'; Estrada 53'; Brown (yellow card) 65'; Clowes (yellow card) 73'; Hassan 88'; Ochoa 90+3'	Stadium: Ontario Soccer Centre; Referee: David Barrie

September 11	Toronto FC II	2–1	Orlando City B	Vaughan, Ontario
7:30PM	Hundal 28'; Osorio (yellow card) 67'; John 71'; Edwards (yellow card) 84'	Report	Cox 5', (yellow card) 74'; Ribeiro (yellow card) 84'; Ellis-Hayden (yellow card) 90'	Stadium: Ontario Soccer Centre; Attendance: 1,300; Referee: Yusri Rudolf

September 24	Rochester Rhinos	1–0	Toronto FC II	Rochester, New York
5:05PM	Duba	Report		Stadium: Rochester Rhinos Stadium; Referee: Charles Murphy

== Statistics ==
=== Squad and statistics ===
As of September 24, 2016

No.	Pos	Nat	Player	Total		United Soccer League	
No.	Pos	Nat	Player	Apps	Goals	Apps	Goals
1	GK	(United States) USA	Clint Irwin	2	0	2+0	0
5	DF	(Canada) CAN	Ashtone Morgan	1	0	1+0	0
6	DF	(United States) USA	Nick Hagglund	4	1	4+0	1
11	FW	(Canada) CAN	Molham Babouli	6	0	6+0	0
13	DF	(France) FRA	Clément Simonin	8	0	3+5	0
14	MF	(Canada) CAN	Jay Chapman	2	0	2+0	0
15	DF	(United States) USA	Eriq Zavaleta	2	0	1+1	0
19	MF	(United States) USA	Daniel Lovitz	2	0	1+1	0
20	MF	(Canada) CAN	Chris Mannella	22	0	17+5	0
22	FW	(Canada) CAN	Jordan Hamilton	4	0	3+1	0
25	GK	(United States) USA	Alex Bono	8	0	8+0	0
28	DF	(United States) USA	Mark Bloom	2	0	1+1	0
30	GK	(Canada) CAN	Phil Di Bennardo	7	0	7+0	0
31	FW	(Mexico) MEX	Sal Bernal	23	1	17+6	1
32	DF	(United States) USA	Wesley Charpie	22	0	21+1	0
34	DF	(Canada) CAN	Skylar Thomas	25	2	24+1	2
35	MF	(Canada) CAN	Leonard Sohn	2	0	0+2	0
36	MF	(United States) USA	Brian James	29	2	21+8	2
37	DF	(Canada) CAN	Adam Bouchard	9	0	5+4	0
38	MF	(Japan) JPN	Kota Sakurai	2	0	0+2	0
40	GK	(Canada) CAN	Quillan Roberts	9	0	9+0	0
42	DF	(United States) USA	Mitchell Taintor	23	1	23+0	1
43	DF	(Canada) CAN	Andrew Dias	1	0	1+0	0
44	DF	(Trinidad and Tobago) TRI	Triston Hodge	3	0	2+1	0
45	MF	(Canada) CAN	Luca Uccello	20	3	13+7	3
46	FW	(United States) USA	Ben Spencer	2	0	0+2	0
47	DF	(Canada) CAN	Rocco Romeo	1	0	0+1	0
48	MF	(Canada) CAN	Raheem Edwards	20	6	16+4	6
49	MF	(Jamaica) JAM	Martin Davis	9	1	3+6	1
50	FW	(Canada) CAN	Richie Ennin	4	0	1+3	0
51	FW	(Trinidad and Tobago) TRI	Ricardo John	4	3	4+0	3
53	DF	(Canada) CAN	Steven Furlano	4	0	3+1	0
54	MF	(Canada) CAN	Ethan Beckford	3	0	0+3	0
55	MF	(Canada) CAN	Aidan Daniels	23	1	15+8	1
56	FW	(Canada) CAN	Malik Johnson	21	4	12+9	4
58	DF	(Canada) CAN	Anthony Osorio	24	0	21+3	0
61	MF	(The Gambia) GAM	Bubacarr Jobe	13	1	10+3	1
62	FW	(Canada) CAN	Reshon Phillip	3	0	0+3	0
63	MF	(Canada) CAN	Liam Fraser	22	2	16+6	2
64	FW	(Canada) CAN	Shaan Hundal	27	6	21+6	6
65	MF	(Canada) CAN	Marko Maletic	7	0	4+3	0
67	MF	(Canada) CAN	Dante Campbell	1	0	0+1	0
80	GK	(Canada) CAN	Angelo Cavalluzzo	5	0	3+2	0
92	GK	(Canada) CAN	Nathan Ingham	2	0	1+1	0
	FW	(United States) USA	Ayo Akinola	10	2	4+6	2
	DF	(Canada) CAN	Robert Boskovic	12	0	4+8	0
	DF	(Canada) CAN	Nikola Stakic	1	0	0+1	0

=== Goals and assists ===
Correct as of September 24, 2016

Goals
Pos.	Playing Pos.	Nation	Name	United Soccer League	Total
1	MF	(Canada)	Raheem Edwards	6	6
1	FW	(Canada)	Shaan Hundal	6	6
3	FW	(Canada)	Malik Johnson	4	4
4	FW	(Trinidad and Tobago)	Ricardo John	3	3
4	MF	(Canada)	Luca Uccello	3	3
6	FW	(United States)	Ayo Akinola	2	2
6	MF	(Canada)	Liam Fraser	2	2
6	MF	(United States)	Brian James	2	2
6	DF	(Canada)	Skylar Thomas	2	2
10	FW	(Mexico)	Sal Bernal	1	1
10	MF	(Canada)	Aidan Daniels	1	1
10	MF	(Jamaica)	Martin Davis	1	1
10	DF	(United States)	Nick Hagglund	1	1
10	FW	(The Gambia)	Bubacarr Jobe	1	1
10	DF	(United States)	Mitchell Taintor	1	1
Total				36	36

Assists
Pos.	Playing Pos.	Nation	Name	United Soccer League	Total
1	MF	(Canada)	Raheem Edwards	4	4
2	MF	(United States)	Brian James	3	3
3	FW	(Canada)	Molham Babouli	2	2
3	FW	(Mexico)	Sal Bernal	2	2
3	DF	(Canada)	Skylar Thomas	2	2
3	MF	(Canada)	Luca Uccello	2	2
7	DF	(United States)	Mark Bloom	1	1
7	DF	(Canada)	Adam Bouchard	1	1
7	MF	(Canada)	Aidan Daniels	1	1
7	FW	(Canada)	Shaan Hundal	1	1
7	MF	(The Gambia)	Bubacarr Jobe	1	1
7	MF	(Canada)	Chris Mannella	1	1
7	DF	(Canada)	Anthony Osorio	1	1
7	DF	(United States)	Mitchell Taintor	1	1
Total				23	23

=== Clean sheets ===
Includes all competitive matches. Correct as of September 24, 2016

R	Pos	Nat	Name	United Soccer League	Total
1	GK	(Canada)	Quillan Roberts	1	1
			TOTALS	1	1

=== Disciplinary record ===
Correct as of September 24, 2016

No.	Pos.	Name	United Soccer League		Total	
No.	Pos.	Name	Booked	Sent off (straight red)	Booked	Sent off (straight red)
13	DF	(France) Clément Simonin	2	0	2	0
20	MF	(Canada) Chris Mannella	2	0	2	0
22	FW	(Canada) Jordan Hamilton	1	0	1	0
28	DF	(United States) Mark Bloom	1	0	1	0
31	FW	(Mexico) Sal Bernal	1	0	1	0
32	DF	(United States) Wesley Charpie	0	1	0	1
34	DF	(Canada) Skylar Thomas	5	2	5	2
36	MF	(United States) Brian James	4	0	4	0
37	DF	(Canada) Adam Bouchard	1	0	1	0
42	DF	(United States) Mitchell Taintor	3	1	3	1
45	MF	(Canada) Luca Uccello	1	0	1	0
48	MF	(Canada) Raheem Edwards	5	0	5	0
51	DF	(Canada) Robert Boskovic	2	0	2	0
53	DF	(Canada) Steven Furlano	1	0	1	0
55	MF	(Canada) Aidan Daniels	3	0	3	0
58	MF	(Canada) Anthony Osorio	8	0	8	0
61	MF	(The Gambia) Bubacarr Jobe	3	1	3	1
64	FW	(Canada) Shaan Hundal	2	0	2	0
65	MF	(Canada) Marko Maletic	1	0	1	0
92	GK	(Canada) Nathan Ingham	1	0	1	0
Total			46	5	46	5

== Recognition ==
=== USL Team of the Week ===
Week	Players	Bench	Opponent	Link
3	(Canada) Raheem Edwards		FC Montreal	
5		(Canada) Raheem Edwards	FC Cincinnati	
8	(United States) Nick Hagglund		Richmond Kickers	
12		(Canada) Luca Uccello	Rochester Rhinos	
16	(United States) Ayo Akinola	(Canada) Aidan Daniels	Harrisburg City Islanders	
19	(Canada) Shaan Hundal	(Canada) Raheem Edwards	Bethlehem Steel FC	
23		(Trinidad and Tobago) Ricardo John	FC Montreal	

=== USL Goal of the Week ===
Week	Player	Opponent	Ref
20	(United States) Mitchell Taintor	Orlando City B	
