= Andrew Dias =

Canadian soccer player

Personal information
- Full name: Andrew Dias
- Date of birth: May 19, 1998 (age 28)
- Place of birth: Toronto, Ontario, Canada
- Height: 1.78 m (5 ft 10 in)
- Position: Defender

Youth career
- North Toronto Nitros
- Toronto FC

Senior career*
Years	Team	Apps	(Gls)
2015–2017	Toronto FC III	28	(0)
2015–2017	Toronto FC II	3	(0)

International career^{‡}
2015	Canada U17	1	(0)
- * Club domestic league appearances and goals as of August 14, 2017 ‡ National team caps and goals as of March 25, 2016

Andrew Dias (born May 19, 1998) is a Canadian soccer player.

== Career ==
=== Club ===
Dias made two appearances for Toronto FC II during the 2015 USL season, after being called up from the TFC Academy. He came off the bench to make his debut during a 3–2 win over FC Montreal on September 5, 2015, before making his first start for the club in a 2–0 defeat to Rochester Rhinos on September 24, 2015. Dias remains with Toronto FC II on loan from the academy ahead of the 2016 USL season.

=== International ===
Dias was one of nine Toronto FC players named in Canada's squad for the CONCACAF Under-17 Championship. After being listed three times as an unused substitute, he made his U17 debut in a 3–1 victory over Saint Lucia on March 9, 2015. He remained as an unused substitute for Canada's final two games of the tournament before losing in the play-off round.

== Career statistics ==
As of October 30, 2017

Club statistics
Club	Season	League			Cup		Other		Total	
Club	Season	Division	Apps	Goals	Apps	Goals	Apps	Goals	Apps	Goals
Toronto FC III	2015	PDL	2	0	—		—		2	0
Toronto FC III	2016	PDL	13	0	—		—		13	0
Toronto FC III	2017	League1 Ontario	13	0	?	?	—		13	0
Toronto FC III	Total		28	0	0	0	0	0	28	0
Toronto FC II	2015	USL	2	0	—		—		2	0
Toronto FC II	2016	USL	1	0	—		—		1	0
Toronto FC II	Total		3	0	0	0	0	0	3	0
Career total			31	0	0	0	0	0	31	0
