= Marcus Godinho =

Canadian soccer player (born 1997)

Personal information
- Full name: Marcus Valdez Pereira Godinho
- Date of birth: June 28, 1997 (age 29)
- Place of birth: Toronto, Ontario, Canada
- Height: 5 ft 10 in (1.78 m)
- Position: Right-back

Team information
- Current team: Sporting JAX

Youth career
- Sporting Toronto
- North York Hearts-Azzurri
- 2011–2015: Toronto FC

Senior career*
Years	Team	Apps	(Gls)
2015	Toronto FC III	2	(0)
2015	Toronto FC II	7	(0)
2016	Vaughan Azzurri	2	(0)
2016–2019	Heart of Midlothian	17	(1)
2017–2018	→ Berwick Rangers (loan)	13	(0)
2019–2021	FSV Zwickau	30	(0)
2021–2022	Vancouver Whitecaps FC	26	(0)
2023–2025	Korona Kielce	45	(1)
2025	Degerfors IF	2	(0)
2026	HFX Wanderers FC	11	(0)
2026–	Sporting JAX	7	(0)

International career
2015–2016	Canada U18	8	(0)
2016	Canada U20	3	(0)
2021	Canada U23	4	(0)
2018–2020	Canada	5	(0)
- * Club domestic league appearances and goals as of 31 October 2026

Marcus Valdez Pereira Godinho (born June 28, 1997) is a Canadian professional soccer player who plays as a right-back for USL Championship club Sporting JAX.

== Club career ==
=== Toronto FC II ===
After spending time with the Toronto FC Academy in the Second Division of the Canadian Soccer League, Godinho signed an Academy Player Agreement with USL club Toronto FC II. He made his professional debut for the club on March 28, 2015 in a 2–0 victory over FC Montreal.

=== Heart of Midlothian ===
After playing with Vaughan Azzurri of League1 Ontario to stay match fit, on June 15, 2016, Godinho signed for Hearts and joined up with the club's development squad ahead of the 2016–17 season. In August 2017, Godinho was loaned to Scottish League Two side Berwick Rangers until January 2018. Godinho signed a contract extension with Hearts until 2020 on February 22, 2018. He made his debut for Hearts in the Scottish Cup against Motherwell on March 4, and his league debut the following weekend on March 9 in the Edinburgh derby against Hibernian. He scored his first goal for Hearts against St Johnstone on January 26, 2019.

=== FSV Zwickau ===
In July 2019, Godinho joined German 3. Liga side FSV Zwickau on a two-year contract. He made his competitive debut for Zwickau in their season opener against SV Meppen on July 25. In May 2021 upon expiration of his contract, Godinho departed the club.

=== Vancouver Whitecaps FC ===
On August 20, 2021, Godinho returned to Canada and joined Major League Soccer club Vancouver Whitecaps FC. He made his first appearance for Vancouver on August 30, coming off the bench in a 4-1 victory over Real Salt Lake. In December 2021 Vancouver announced they had picked up Godinho's contract option, keep him at the club through the 2022 season. At the end of the 2022 season, Vancouver announced they would not exercise the option on Godinho's contract for 2023, ending his time with the club.

=== Korona Kielce ===
In January 2023, Godinho returned to Europe and joined Polish club Korona Kielce on a contract until the end of the season. He made his debut for his new club on February 6 against Cracovia. Godinho scored his first goal for Korona Kielce on May 12 against Piast Gliwice, netting a consolation goal in a 2–1 defeat. In June 2023, Korona Kielce announced they had signed Godinho to a new contract through the 2023–24 Ekstraklasa season. His 2023–24 campaign ended prematurely on April 12, 2024, when he tore his left ACL in a 1–0 away loss to Warta Poznań. Godinho was released from the club at the end of the 2024–25 season.

=== Degerfors IF ===
On August 15, 2025, Godinho signed for Allsvenskan club Degerfors IF on a deal until the end of the year.

=== HFX Wanderers ===
In 2026, he joined the [[HFX Wanderers]] in the Canadian Premier League.

=== Sporting JAX ===
In July 2026, he joined Sporting JAX in the USL Championship, in a player swap with Adonijah Reid moving to HFX Wanderers.

== International career ==
=== Youth ===
Godinho was born in Canada to Portuguese parents. He has represented Canada at the under-18 and under-20 levels. In August 2016, Godinho was called up to the U-20 team for a pair of friendlies against Costa Rica. Godinho was named to the Canadian U-23 provisional roster for the 2020 CONCACAF Men's Olympic Qualifying Championship on February 26, 2020. He was named to the final squad ahead of the rescheduled tournament on March 10, 2021.

=== Senior ===
Godinho received his first call up to the Canadian senior team on March 12, 2018 for a friendly against New Zealand He made his debut in that match, a 1–0 victory for Canada. In May 2019, Godinho was named to the final 23-man squad for the 2019 CONCACAF Gold Cup.

== Career statistics ==
=== Club ===
As of match played May 24, 2025

Appearances and goals by club, season and competition
Club	Season	League			National cup (Note: Includes Scottish Cup, Canadian Championship, Polish Cup)		League cup		Other		Total	
Club	Season	Division	Apps	Goals	Apps	Goals	Apps	Goals	Apps	Goals	Apps	Goals
Toronto FC III	2015	PDL	2	0	—		—		—		2	0
Toronto FC II	2015	USL	7	0	—		—		—		7	0
Vaughan Azzurri	2016	League1 Ontario	2	0	—		—		—		2	0
Heart of Midlothian	2017–18	Scottish Premiership	5	0	1	0	—		—		6	0
Heart of Midlothian	2018–19	Scottish Premiership	12	1	2	0	—		—		14	1
Heart of Midlothian	Total		17	1	3	0	0	0	0	0	20	1
Berwick Rangers (loan)	2017–18	Scottish League Two	13	1	—		—		1 (Note: Appearance in Scottish Challenge Cup)	0	14	1
FSV Zwickau	2019–20	3. Liga	25	0	0	0	—		0	0	25	0
FSV Zwickau	2020–21	3. Liga	5	0	0	0	—		0	0	5	0
FSV Zwickau	Total		30	0	0	0	0	0	0	0	30	0
Vancouver Whitecaps FC	2021	MLS	4	0	0	0	—		1 (Note: Appearance in MLS Cup playoffs)	0	5	0
Vancouver Whitecaps FC	2022	MLS	22	0	3	0	0	0	0	0	25	0
Vancouver Whitecaps FC	Total		26	0	3	0	0	0	1	0	30	0
Korona Kielce	2022–23	Ekstraklasa	15	1	0	0	—		—		15	1
Korona Kielce	2023–24	Ekstraklasa	21	0	3	0	—		—		24	0
Korona Kielce	2024–25	Ekstraklasa	9	0	1	0	—		—		10	0
Korona Kielce	Total		45	1	4	0	0	0	0	0	49	1
Career total			142	3	10	0	0	0	2	0	154	3

=== International ===
As of January 16, 2020

Appearances and goals by national team and year
National team	Year	Apps	Goals
Canada	2018	1	0
Canada	2019	3	0
Canada	2020	1	0
Total		5	0

== Honours ==
Vancouver Whitecaps FC

- Canadian Championship: 2022
