= Anthony Osorio =

Canadian soccer player (born 1994)

Personal information
- Full name: Anthony Osorio
- Date of birth: April 13, 1994 (age 32)
- Place of birth: Toronto, Ontario, Canada
- Height: 1.72 m (5 ft 8 in)
- Positions: Left back; midfielder

Youth career
- 2003-: Brampton Youth SC
- Clarkson Sheridan SC
- 2012–2014: Nacional
- 2014–2015: Toronto FC

Senior career*
Years	Team	Apps	(Gls)
2014–2017	Toronto FC III	14	(9)
2015–2017	Toronto FC II	50	(0)
2018	Vaughan Azzurri	9	(1)
2018–2019	Mississauga MetroStars (indoor)	0	(0)

International career
2013	Canada U20	2	(1)
- * Club domestic league appearances and goals as of November 23, 2019

Anthony Osorio (born April 13, 1994) is a Canadian professional soccer player who last played as a defender and midfielder for the Mississauga MetroStars in the Major Arena Soccer League.

== Club career ==
Osorio attended St. Edmund Campion where he represented the school team, having grown up in Brampton, Ontario. He was part of the team that won the school's second and third Ontario Federation of Schools Athletic Association Championship in four years.

In 2013 after a successful trial in Uruguay Osorio joined the u19 side of Nacional. Then moved up to the reserve team the following year in 2014.

=== Toronto FC II ===
He joined the Toronto FC Academy in July 2014, and helped the club to become League1 Ontario champions and Inter-Provincial Cup Championship winners. Osorio was rewarded with a USL pro contract on December 9, 2015, joining Toronto FC II and going on to make 19 appearances in his inaugural season. The midfielder made his professional debut on April 25, 2015, playing in a match against the Pittsburgh Riverhounds in the USL. Osorio would spend three seasons with the club prior to be released at the conclusion of the 2017 season.

=== Post-TFC ===
In 2018, he played for Vaughan Azzurri in League1 Ontario. After that he joined the Mississauga MetroStars of the Major Arena Soccer League.

== International career ==
Osorio represented Canada at the 2013 Francophone games in Nice, France. He made his international debut in a friendly as a halftime substitute vs Cameroon that ended in a 0–0 draw. Osorio made his first international start and recorded his first international goal in a 1–0 win over Rwanda on September 8, 2013.

== Personal life ==
Osorio's parents are Colombian – his father is a native of Cali, while his mother was born in Medellín. Osorio's older brother, Jonathan Osorio, plays for Toronto FC and represents the Canadian seniors. Osorio's younger brother, Nicholas, previously played in the Toronto FC system and represented the Canadian under-15s.

In 2018, Osorio suffered a nasty ACL tear which forced him to undergo surgery and not participate at all in the Metrostars' inaugural season as well as take all of 2019 off on the sidelines to recover from the tragic injury. Osorio was linked to a move to CPL side York 9 FC had the injury not occurred.

== Career statistics ==
As of October 30, 2018

Club statistics
Club	Season	League			League Cup		Other		Total	
Club	Season	Division	Apps	Goals	Apps	Goals	Apps	Goals	Apps	Goals
Toronto FC III	2014	League1 Ontario	5	2	2	2	2 (Note: Appearances in Inter-Provincial Cup.)	0	9	4
Toronto FC III	2015	PDL	8	0	—		—		8	0
Toronto FC III	2017	League1 Ontario	1	0	?	?	—		1	0
Toronto FC III	Total		14	2	2	2	2	0	9	0
Toronto FC II	2015	USL	19	0	—		—		19	0
Toronto FC II	2016	USL	24	0	—		—		24	0
Toronto FC II	2017	USL	7	0	—		—		7	0
Toronto FC II	Total		50	0	0	0	0	0	50	0
Vaughan Azzurri	2018	League1 Ontario	9	1	?	?	?	?	9	1
Career total			73	3	2	2	2	0	77	5
