= John Dinkota =

Swiss footballer (born 1994)

Personal information
- Date of birth: 11 December 1994 (age 31)
- Place of birth: Geneva, Switzerland
- Height: 1.78 m (5 ft 10 in)
- Position: Defender

Team information
- Current team: Louhans-Cuiseaux

Youth career
- 2012–2014: Montreal Impact

Senior career*
Years	Team	Apps	(Gls)
2014	Montreal Impact U23	10	(0)
2015	FC Montreal	11	(0)
2016	Mont-Royal Outremont	2	(0)
2016–2017	Oissel	16	(0)
2017–2022	Jura Sud	49	(0)
2022–2023	Jura Dolois	15	(0)
2023–	Louhans-Cuiseaux	29	(0)
- * Club domestic league appearances and goals as of 2 November 2024

John Dinkota (born 11 December 1994) is a Swiss professional footballer who plays as a defender for French Championnat National 3 club Louhans-Cuiseaux.

== Career ==
Born in Geneva, Switzerland, Dinkota and his family moved to Quebec when he was seven years old. He started playing for local clubs before joining the academy of the Montreal Impact. He also played for PDL side Montreal Impact U23. He then joined USL affiliate side FC Montreal. Dinkota made his professional debut for FC Montreal on March 28, 2015 against Toronto FC II. He started and played 78 minutes as FC Montreal lost 2–0.

In May 2016, Dinkota signed with Mont-Royal Outremont in the PLSQ.

Dinkota has played amateur football in France since 2016.

== Personal life ==
Born in Switzerland, Dinkota is of Congolese descent. He moved to Canada at the age of 7.

== Career statistics ==
As of 9 February 2018

Appearances and goals by club, season and competition
Club	Season	League			National Cup		League Cup		Other		Total	
Club	Season	Division	Apps	Goals	Apps	Goals	Apps	Goals	Apps	Goals	Apps	Goals
FC Montreal	2015	USL	11	0	0	0	—		—		11	0
Mont-Royal Outremont	2016	Première ligue du Québec	2	0	—		2	0	—		2	0
Oissel	2016–17	CFA 2	16	0	0	0	—		—		16	0
Jura Sud	2017–18	National 2	7	0	0	0	—		—		7	0
Jura Sud	2018–19	National 2	18	0	0	0	—		—		18	0
Jura Sud	2019–20	National 2	16	0	1	0	—		—		17	0
Jura Sud	2020–21	National 2	4	0	0	0	—		—		4	0
Jura Sud	2021–22	National 2	4	0	2	0	—		—		6	0
Jura Sud	Total		49	0	3	0	—		—		52	0
Career total			78	0	3	0	0	0	0	0	81	0
