= Yoana Peralta =

Dominican footballer

Personal information
- Full name: Yoana Peralta Fernández
- Date of birth: 1999 (age 26–27)
- Place of birth: Toronto, Ontario, Canada
- Height: 1.65 m (5 ft 5 in)
- Position: Midfielder

Team information
- Current team: Vaughan Azzurri B

Youth career
- Club Uruguay Toronto
- El Salvador Toronto
- Glen Shields FC
- 2014–2015: King City SC

College career
| Years | Team | Apps | (Gls) |
| 2017–2018 | York Lions | 20 | (0) |
| 2021 | Seneca Sting | 5 | (3) |

Senior career*
| Years | Team | Apps | (Gls) |
| 2017 | Aurora FC | 2 | (1) |
| 2019–2021 | Vaughan Azzurri | 12 | (2) |
| 2022 | Einherji | 13 | (5) |
| 2023–2025 | Vaughan Azzurri | 38 | (4) |
| 2026– | Vaughan Azzurri B | 4 | (0) |

International career^{‡}
| 2021–2023 | Dominican Republic | 3 | (0) |
- * Club domestic league appearances and goals as of July 16, 2026 ‡ National team caps and goals as of April 9, 2023

Yoana Peralta Fernández (born 1999) is a footballer who plays Vaughan Azzurri in the Ontario Premier League. Born in Canada, she plays for the Dominican Republic national team.

== Early life ==
Peralta began playing youth soccer in Canada with Club Uruguay Toronto, before later playing with El Salvador Toronto, Glen Shields FC, and King City SC.

== College career ==
In 2017, she began attending York University, where she played for the women's soccer team. She started three games in her rookie season, before an injury ended her season. She appeared in all of her team's matches in her second season.

In 2021, she began attending Seneca College, where she played for the women's team.

== Club career ==
In 2017, Peralta played with Aurora FC in League1 Ontario.

In 2019 and 2021 (the 2020 season was cancelled due to the COVID-19 pandemic), she played with Vaughan Azzurri in League1 Ontario.

In January 2022, she signed a professional contract with Icelandic club Einherji in the second tier 1. deild kvenna.

In 2023, she played with Vaughan Azzurri in League1 Ontario.

== International career ==
Peralta has Canadian, Dominican, and Uruguayan nationality.

In 2021, Peralta was called up to the Dominican Republic national team. Peralta made her senior debut for the Dominican Republic on 25 October 2021 in a friendly against Bolivia.

She was again called up to the squad in April 2023 ahead of friendlies against Panama.

== Career statistics ==
As of match played August 4, 2024

| Club | Season | League | | | Playoffs | | National Cup | | League Cup | | Total | |
| Club | Season | Division | Apps | Goals | Apps | Goals | Apps | Goals | Apps | Goals | Apps | Goals |
|---|---|---|---|---|---|---|---|---|---|---|---|---|
| Aurora FC | 2017 | League1 Ontario | 2 | 1 | — | | — | | 0 | 0 | 2 | 1 |
| Vaughan Azzurri | 2019 | League1 Ontario | 9 | 2 | 4 | 3 | — | | — | | 13 | 5 |
| Vaughan Azzurri | 2021 | League1 Ontario | 3 | 0 | 0 | 0 | — | | — | | 3 | 0 |
| Vaughan Azzurri | Total | | 12 | 2 | 4 | 3 | 0 | 0 | 0 | 0 | 16 | 5 |
| Einherji | 2022 | 1. deild kvenna | 13 | 5 | — | | 1 | 0 | 1 | 0 | 15 | 5 |
| Vaughan Azzurri | 2023 | League1 Ontario | 12 | 4 | 1 | 0 | — | | — | | 13 | 4 |
| Vaughan Azzurri | 2024 | League1 Ontario Premier | 15 | 0 | — | | — | | 1 | 0 | 16 | 0 |
| Vaughan Azzurri | Total | | 27 | 4 | 1 | 0 | 0 | 0 | 1 | 0 | 29 | 4 |
| Career total | | | 54 | 12 | 5 | 3 | 1 | 0 | !2 | 0 | 62 | 18 |
