= St. Edmund Campion Secondary School =

Location
- 275 Brisdale Drive; Brampton, Ontario, L7A 3C7; Canada; 43.69465°N 79.83003°W

Information
- School type: Highschool
- Motto: Named Called Chosen
- Established: September 2, 2003
- Principal: Kwadwo Adusei (acting principal)
- Grades: 9–12
- Colours: Gold, Navy and White
- Team name: The Bears

St. Edmund Campion Catholic Secondary School, commonly referred to simply as Campion, is a high school in Brampton, Ontario, Canada. The school is operated by the Dufferin-Peel Catholic District School Board. As of now there are over 1,800 students enrolled in, and the uniform consists of a navy blue golf shirt, a navy blue golf t-shirt and navy blue pants. Additional uniform pieces include a rugby sweater, a Campion branded sweatshirt and a school sweater. Previously, the uniform consisted of khaki pants but this was altered in 2023.

== Feeder Elementary Schools ==
- St. Aidan Catholic
- St. Angela Merici Catholic
- St. Bonaventure Catholic
- St. Daniel Comboni Catholic
- St. Lucy Catholic
- St. Josephine Bakhita Catholic
- St. Maria Goretti
- St. Rita Elementary School
- St. Ruth Catholic

== History ==
The school opened on September 2, 2003, with 250 grade 9 students in Mississauga whilst the Brampton building was under construction. The Mississauga building was shared by grade 9 students from St. Marcellinus, and John Cabot Secondary Schools. In its second year, there were grade 9 and 10 classes, and the building was shared with students from Metropolitan Andrei elementary school. The school moved to its present building in Brampton in 2005, with 1,300 students in grades 9, 10, and 11, and a grade 12 class from 2006.

== Academics ==
In August 2009, the school principal Kevin McGuire removed the book To Kill a Mockingbird from the grade 10 curriculum due to a complaint received from a parent who expressed concern about the language in the book. It was returned to the grade 10 curriculum in 2011.

St. Edmund Campion offers an Advanced Placement (AP) Program. The AP program provides an enriched classroom setting for highly motivated students in the areas of English, Math, and French. History and Science will be added in grade 10. The program begins in Grade 9 with pre-AP classes in which students study both the Ontario and the AP curriculum. This allows students to continue AP classes in Grades 11 and 12 that prepare students to write AP exams for advanced placement or credit in university.

As of the 2016–17 school year, St. Edmund Campion is ranked the 1st best school in Brampton out of 25 schools in the city. St. Edmund Campion is the best school in West Brampton, after St. Roch Catholic Secondary School.

In May 2018, St. Edmund Campion Secondary School was chosen as a recipient of the 2017–18 Premier’s Award for Accepting Schools. The school was awarded for demonstrating initiative, creativity and leadership in promoting a safe, inclusive and accepting school climate.

== Notable alumni ==
- Jahvon Blair, basketball player
- Tajon Buchanan, footballer
- Shay Colley, basketball player
- Mike Edem, CFL player
- Raz Fresco, rapper/producer
- Ndzemdzela Langwa, footballer
- Cyle Larin, footballer
- Cameron Lawson, CFL player
- Sade McCreath
- Jonathan Osorio, footballer
- Nicholas Osorio, footballer
- Royce Metchie, CFL player
- Godfrey Onyeka, CFL player
- NorthSideBenji, rapper
- Houdini (rapper), rapper

== See also ==
- Education in Ontario
- List of secondary schools in Ontario
