= Marcos Nunes =

Canadian soccer player (born 1992)

Personal information
- Full name: Marcos André Gaio Nunes
- Date of birth: 3 July 1992 (age 34)
- Place of birth: Brampton, Ontario, Canada
- Height: 1.78 m (5 ft 10 in)
- Positions: Midfielder; forward

Youth career
- 2003-?: Brampton Youth SC

College career
Years	Team	Apps	(Gls)
2012–2013	Humber Hawks		

Senior career*
Years	Team	Apps	(Gls)
2013	Brampton United	17	(13)
2014	Travnik	9	(0)
2014	Toronto FC III	8	(11)
2015	Toronto FC II	15	(1)
2016	Oakville Blue Devils FC	2	(0)
2017–2018	Woodbridge Strikers	4	(3)
2020	SC Ideal	0	(0)
- * Club domestic league appearances and goals as of May 27, 2019

Marcos Nunes (born 3 July 1992) is a Canadian soccer player.

== Club career ==
Nunes spent time in college with the Humber Hawks.

During 2013, he played with Brampton United. During the winter break of the 2013–14 season he signed with Bosnian Premier League side NK Travnik where he played until summer 2014.

Nunes joined TFC Academy in June 2014, and played with the senior academy team in League1 Ontario.

He signed with Toronto FC II on March 27, 2015. He made his debut the next day against FC Montreal and scored a goal in the match off a free kick delivered by Molham Babouli. Toronto FC II won the match 2–0.
