= Rahim Thorpe =

Canadian soccer player (born 1997)

Personal information
- Date of birth: August 22, 1997 (age 29)
- Place of birth: Canada
- Height: 1.82 m (6 ft 0 in)
- Position: Forward

Youth career
- Brampton YSC
- Toronto Lynx
- Toronto FC

College career
Years	Team	Apps	(Gls)
- Sheridan Bruins

Senior career*
Years	Team	Apps	(Gls)
2015	Toronto FC III	10	(3)
2015	Toronto FC II	1	(0)
2016–2017	Oakville Blue Devils FC	8	(0)
2018–2019	North Mississauga SC	13	(6)
2023	Simcoe County Rovers	8	(1)

International career
2015	Canada U18		
- * Club domestic league appearances and goals as of July 15, 2023

Rahim Thorpe (born August 22, 1997) is a Canadian soccer player who plays as a forward.

== Early life ==
He played youth soccer with Brampton YSC and the Toronto Lynx.

== College career ==
He played college soccer with the Sheridan Bruins. In 2018, he scored back-to-back playoff hat-tricks. Sheridan ultimately lost to Humber College in the finals, but Thorpe was named a tournament all-star.

== Club career ==
In 2015, he played with Toronto FC III in the Premier Development League. In March 2015, he signed an academy player agreement with Toronto FC II. He made his debut for Toronto FC II on March 15 against FC Montréal.

In 2016, he played with Oakville Blue Devils FC in League1 Ontario, making seven appearances. He made a single appearance the following season.

In 2018, he joined North Mississauga SC, making six appearances. He scored his first goal on May 5 against ProStars FC. In 2019, he scored 4 goals in seven league appearances, also appearing in one playoff match. He scored a hat trick on July 14, 2019, in a 9–0 victory over Toronto Skillz FC.

In 2023, he played with Simcoe County Rovers in League1 Ontario.

== International career ==
In 2015, he was called up to the Canada U18 for the Slovakia Cup. He scored in the first match of the tournament against Slovakia U18.
