= Frédéric Lajoie-Gravelle =

Canadian soccer player and sociologist

Personal information
- Date of birth: February 14, 1993 (age 33)
- Place of birth: Gatineau, Quebec, Canada
- Position: Forward

Team information
- Current team: FC Montreal
- Number: 67

Youth career
- 2013–2014: Montreal Impact

Senior career*
Years	Team	Apps	(Gls)
2010–2011	Albi	16	(6)
2014	Montreal Impact U23	11	(5)
2015–	FC Montreal	26	(3)
- * Club domestic league appearances and goals as of September 19, 2015

Frédéric Lajoie-Gravelle (born February 14, 1993) was a Canadian soccer player who played for FC Montreal in the USL. He is also a sociologist known for his study's on the search for meaning.

== Career ==
=== Professional ===
Lajoie-Gravelle began his career in France with US Albi on 2010-2011 where he made 16 appearances and scored 6 goals before joining the Montreal Impact Academy in 2013. In 2014, he played in the Premier Development League for Montreal Impact U23 where he made 11 appearances and finished second on the team in goals with five.

On March 13, 2015, it was announced that Lajoie-Gravelle would join FC Montreal, a USL affiliate club of the Montreal Impact for their inaugural season. He made his professional debut a month later in a 3–0 defeat to the Rochester Rhinos. He finished the season with 3 goals and 5 assists. He retired from soccer in 2016 to look forward with University of Montreal. After a year away from soccer, he played in the university league (RSEQ) and finished the season top scorer with 7 goals in 8 games and he was selected in the allstar team.
