= Nicholas Osorio =

Canadian professional soccer player (born 1998)

Personal information
- Full name: Nicholas Osorio
- Date of birth: January 20, 1998 (age 28)
- Place of birth: Toronto, Ontario, Canada
- Height: 1.78 m (5 ft 10 in)
- Position: Midfielder

Youth career
- Brampton Youth SC
- Brampton East SC
- –2016: Toronto FC

College career
Years	Team	Apps	(Gls)
2017–2019	Toronto Varsity Blues	39	(8)

Senior career*
Years	Team	Apps	(Gls)
2015–2017	Toronto FC III	45	(8)
2015	Toronto FC II	2	(0)
2018–2023	Alliance United	52	(0)
- * Club domestic league appearances and goals as of August 11, 2023

Nicholas Osorio (born January 20, 1998) is a Canadian soccer player who currently plays as a midfielder. His brother Jonathan plays for Toronto FC.

== Playing career ==
Having grown up in Brampton, Ontario, Osorio began playing football Brampton Youth SC at the age of four. He joined the Toronto FC Academy U15 team in 2012, and after progressing through the system, he was called up to the Toronto FC II squad, the feeder team to the MLS outfit, in 2015.

Osorio made his professional debut on July 19, 2015, playing in a 1–0 defeat to Saint Louis in the USL. His second appearance came three days later in a 1–0 defeat to FC Montreal.

He began attending the University of Toronto in 2017, joining the Varsity Blues soccer team. In 2017, he appeared in eight regular season matches, scoring one goal against Nipissing, and appeared in one playoff match. In 2018, he appeared in 13 regular season matches, scoring twice, as well as two playoff matches. In 2019, he appeared in 11 regular season matches and four playoff games, scoring four regular season goals and one playoff goal. The 2020 season was cancelled due to the COVID-19 pandemic.

In 2018 and 2019, he played for Alliance United in the semi-professional League1 Ontario.

== International career ==
Osorio selected for two Canada Under-15 camps back in 2013 under the guidance of Tony Fonseca and Ante Jazic. He went with the U15 national team to Mexico for the 2013 Copa de México de Naciones.

== Personal life ==
Osorio's parents are Colombian – his father is a native of Cali, while his mother was born in Medellín. His older brothers, Jonathan and Anthony, have played for Toronto FC and Toronto FC II respectively.

== Career statistics ==
As of April 16, 2023

Club statistics
Club	Season	League			Playoffs		League Cup		Total	
Club	Season	Division	Apps	Goals	Apps	Goals	Apps	Goals	Apps	Goals
Toronto FC III	2015	PDL	12	1	—		—		12	1
Toronto FC III	2015	League1 Ontario	?	?	—		?	?	?	?
Toronto FC III	2016	PDL	13	1	—		—		13	1
Toronto FC III	2016	League1 Ontario	11	2	—		?	?	11	2
Toronto FC III	2017	League1 Ontario	9	4	—		?	?	9	4
Toronto FC III	Total		45	8	0	0	0	0	45	8
Toronto FC II	2015	USL	2	0	—		—		2	0
Toronto FC II	Total		2	0	0	0	0	0	2	0
Alliance United FC	2018	League1 Ontario	9	0	0	0	?	?	9	0
Alliance United FC	2019	League1 Ontario	15	0	2	1	—		17	1
Alliance United FC	2021	League1 Ontario Summer Championship	3	0	—		—		3	0
Alliance United FC	2022	League1 Ontario	10	0	2	0	—		12	0
Alliance United FC	2023	League1 Ontario	1	0	0	0	—		1	0
Total		38	0	4	1	0	0	42	1	
Career total			85	8	4	1	0	0	89	9
