= Mark Serjeant =

Canadian soccer player (born 1996)

Personal information
- Full name: Mark Serjeant
- Date of birth: February 19, 1996 (age 30)
- Place of birth: Toronto, Ontario, Canada
- Height: 1.75 m (5 ft 9 in)
- Position: Midfielder

Youth career
- 2010–2013: Toronto FC

College career
Years	Team	Apps	(Gls)
2014	Grand Canyon Antelopes	18	(0)
2015–2018	Western Mustangs	49	(5)

Senior career*
Years	Team	Apps	(Gls)
2015	Toronto FC II	4	(0)
2017	FC London	12	(0)
2026	North Toronto Nitros	1	(0)
- * Club domestic league appearances and goals as of March 5, 2019

Mark Serjeant (born February 19, 1996) is a Canadian soccer player with plays for North Toronto Nitros in the Ontario Premier League.

== Career ==
=== College ===
Serjeant attended Grand Canyon University in 2014, and played for the Antelopes. During the season, he appeared in 19 games, starting in 10, and registered 1 assist. In 2010, he played with TFC Academy in the Second Division of the Canadian Soccer League.

=== Club career ===
Sarjeant signed with Toronto FC II on March 20, 2015. He made his debut for the team on March 28 against FC Montreal. Serjeant and TFCII mutually parted ways on August 18, 2015.

In 2026, after spending years playing at the amateur level, Sarjeant returned to the Ontario Premier League with North Toronto Nitros.
