= Jonathan Osorio =

Canadian soccer player (born 1992)

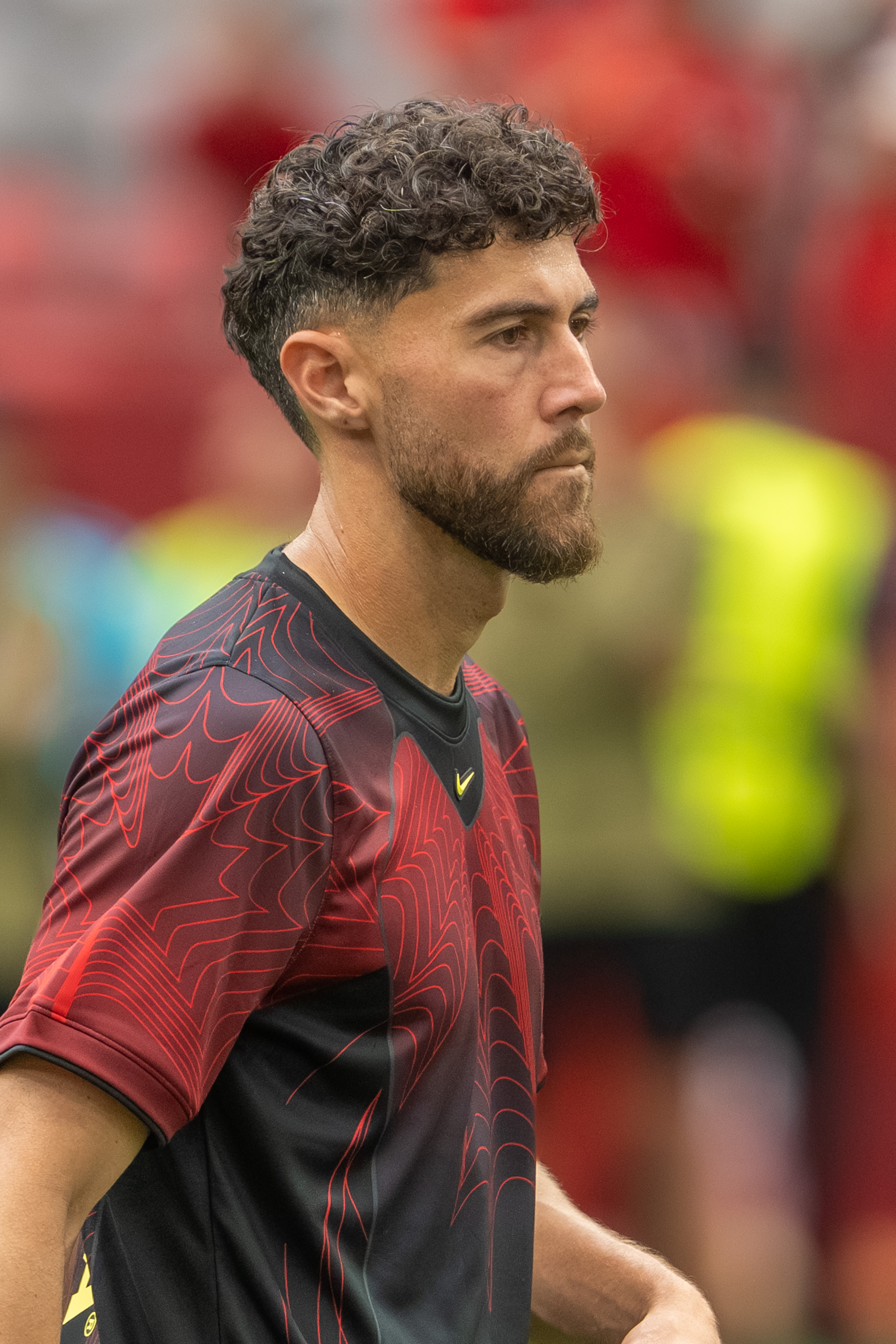
- Osorio with Canada in 2026

Personal information
- Full name: Jonathan Osorio
- Date of birth: June 12, 1992 (age 34)
- Place of birth: Brampton, Ontario, Canada
- Height: 1.75 m (5 ft 9 in)
- Position: Midfielder

Team information
- Current team: Toronto FC
- Number: 21

Youth career
- 2002–2007: Brampton Youth SC
- 2008–2010: Clarkson Sheridan SC
- 2010–2011: Nacional

Senior career*
Years	Team	Apps	(Gls)
2012	SC Toronto	17	(11)
2013–	Toronto FC	351	(53)

International career^{‡}
2011	Canada U20	3	(0)
2013–	Canada	92	(10)
Medal record
Men's soccer
Representing Canada
CONCACAF Nations League
Runner-up	2023
- * Club domestic league appearances and goals as of November 7, 2026 ‡ National team caps and goals as of July 4, 2026

Jonathan Osorio (born June 12, 1992) is a Canadian professional soccer player who plays as a midfielder for Major League Soccer club Toronto FC, which he captains, and the Canada national team.

A product of youth soccer in Brampton who spent two years in the academy of Uruguayan club Nacional, Osorio joined Toronto FC from the Canadian Soccer League in 2013 and has spent his entire professional career with the club. He holds the Toronto FC record for most appearances, won the 2017 MLS Cup as part of the club's treble-winning season, and was named club captain in January 2024.

At international level Osorio has earned more than 90 caps for Canada, playing at two FIFA World Cups, seven CONCACAF Gold Cups and the 2024 Copa América.

== Early life ==
Osorio was born in Brampton, Ontario, to Colombian parents; his father is from Cali and his mother from Medellín. He began playing with Brampton Youth Soccer at the age of 10 and moved at 15 to Clarkson Sheridan SC in neighbouring Mississauga, where he played alongside Lucas Cavallini, another son of South American parents who would become a Canada teammate. He graduated from St. Edmund Campion Secondary School.

After the Clarkson youth team toured Uruguay, both Osorio and Cavallini were offered trials at Nacional and moved to Montevideo in 2010. Osorio spent two years at the academy, progressing from the under-19 side to the reserves, but both Canadians encountered resistance from local players who regarded them as outsiders competing for their places.

He returned to Canada at the end of 2011 into what he later called "dark days". An expected trial with Toronto FC under Paul Mariner did not materialise, a return to Uruguay was no longer possible, and he was struggling with patellar tendinitis. "I was really injured. I didn't have a team," he said. "It was dark days for, I would say, four to five months."

== Club career ==
=== SC Toronto ===
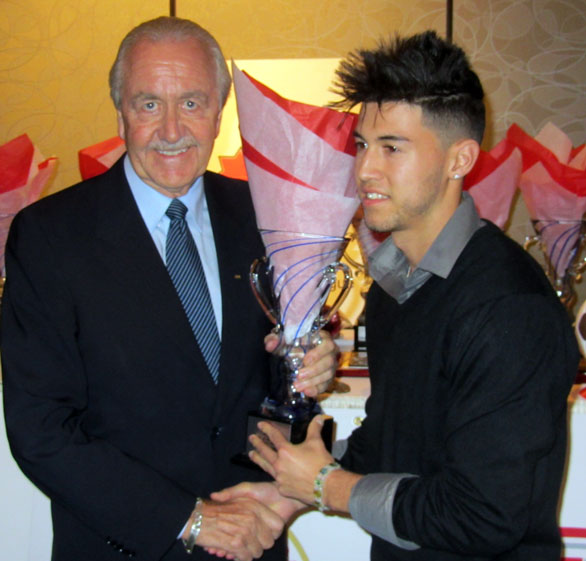
Osorio receives the 2012 Canadian Soccer League Rookie of the Year award

Back in Toronto and without a club after his spell in Uruguay, Osorio was introduced to SC Toronto of the Canadian Soccer League by an acquaintance from his gym who had arranged physiotherapy for him; the league mattered to his prospects because the Toronto FC Academy also competed in it, which gave him a stage on which to be seen. He signed for the 2012 season and finished as the club's second-highest scorer, helping Toronto to third place in the overall standings and a postseason berth. He featured in the playoff quarter-final against the Serbian White Eagles, a 1–0 defeat that ended the club's season, and was named the league's Rookie of the Year.

=== Toronto FC ===
==== Early years and a first MLS Cup final (2013–2016) ====
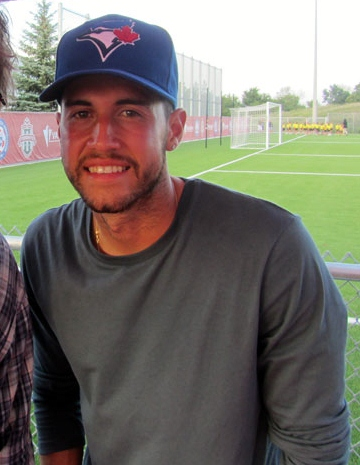
Osorio in 2015

Osorio joined the Toronto FC Academy in September 2012 and was invited to train with the first team during the following preseason, impressing head coach Ryan Nelsen enough to earn a professional contract. Academy coach Danny Dichio had put him forward for the senior preseason after roughly three weeks of training. He made his Major League Soccer debut on March 9, 2013, against Sporting Kansas City, replacing Terry Dunfield, and scored his first goal three weeks later, coming off the bench to convert in the 78th minute against the Los Angeles Galaxy on March 30. A second followed on April 27, an equaliser in the closing minutes against the New York Red Bulls in a match Toronto lost 2–1 to a late Tim Cahill goal, and the strike won the MLS Goal of the Week award ahead of Andrés Romero. He finished with five league goals in a season in which Toronto won six matches and missed the playoffs for a seventh consecutive year, then spent the off-season training with Championship club Huddersfield Town and Bundesliga side Werder Bremen.

The club's ambitions rose sharply around him, with England international Jermain Defoe and United States captain Michael Bradley arriving before the 2014 season in a recruitment drive marketed as a "bloody big deal", and Osorio has described the change in expectation that followed as the point at which Toronto began behaving like a club that intended to win. The rebuild was completed a year later by the signings of Sebastian Giovinco and Jozy Altidore, and in 2015 Toronto reached the MLS Cup playoffs for the first time since entering the league in 2006. The postseason lasted a single match, a 3–0 defeat to the Montreal Impact at Stade Saputo in the knockout round on October 29.

Osorio's position changed repeatedly during Toronto's first run to a final. He began 2016 as a left-sided midfielder with defensive responsibilities, moved into a central attacking role after Giovinco was injured in August, and returned to the left when Giovinco recovered in October and the team switched to a back three, continuing to link play with the forwards; he scored three times in four matches during the run-in, and Toronto scored 15 goals in the five games in which both players were available. He scored in the knockout-round win over the Philadelphia Union and again in a 5–0 second-leg victory at New York City FC that completed a 7–0 aggregate win, then an MLS postseason record. Toronto then eliminated Montreal in the Eastern Conference Championship after extra time in the second leg, completing a five-match run in which the club scored 17 goals and broke the league's playoff scoring record. They also won the 2016 Canadian Championship, beating Vancouver Whitecaps FC on away goals after a 2–2 aggregate draw settled by a stoppage-time goal in Vancouver on June 29. MLS Cup 2016 ended in a goalless draw at BMO Field and a 5–4 shootout defeat to Seattle Sounders FC.

==== Treble, breakout and a second final (2017–2019) ====
Toronto won the Supporters' Shield, the Canadian Championship and MLS Cup in 2017, but Osorio's own season was awkward, the signing of Víctor Vázquez costing him his place and confining him largely to the bench. He forced his way back for the matches that decided the season, starting both legs of the Eastern Conference final against the Columbus Crew and the final itself, a 2–0 win over Seattle at BMO Field on December 9. Looking back on those years, he said he had grown "every year as a player, as a person" through "many ups, many downs" at the club.

The following season was the most productive of his career. He won the Golden Boot at the 2018 CONCACAF Champions League with four goals, scoring in each round as Toronto reached the final and lost to Guadalajara on penalties. Before that final he framed the 2016 MLS Cup defeat as the education that made the run possible, saying that the squad had at times fallen short but had "learned what we needed to do". His form drew reported interest from clubs in Europe and Mexico that summer. In the 2018 Canadian Championship final he scored in a 2–2 first-leg draw at Vancouver on August 8, and on August 15, in his 200th appearance for the club, set up Giovinco in a 5–2 home win that secured the trophy 7–4 on aggregate and earned him the George Gross Memorial Trophy as the tournament's most valuable player, with three goals in four matches. A contract extension signed on August 30 made him one of the highest-paid Canadian players in the world.

Toronto returned to MLS Cup a year later and lost 3–1 to Seattle on November 10, 2019, in a final whose opening goal was disputed: Kelvin Leerdam scored after Osorio lost possession in a collision with Cristian Roldan that the referee did not penalise, and Osorio afterwards accused Roldan of obstructing him.

==== Pandemic seasons and concussion (2020–2022) ====
Osorio in a Canadian Championship match in 2022

The COVID-19 pandemic took Toronto away from BMO Field for the better part of two years. Unable to host matches in Canada because of cross-border restrictions, the club played its home fixtures from late September 2020 at Pratt & Whitney Stadium in East Hartford, Connecticut. The arrangement extended into the first half of 2021, when Toronto was based in Florida and Connecticut, and general manager Ali Curtis later cited the toll of that displacement, alongside injuries, in a season that left the club second from bottom of the Eastern Conference with the second-worst defensive record in the league; Chris Armas was dismissed in July after a 7–1 defeat to D.C. United and Javier Pérez finished the year as interim head coach. Toronto exercised its contract option on Osorio for 2022 that December.

The club rebuilt around the Italy internationals Lorenzo Insigne and Federico Bernardeschi, a change Osorio said had lifted expectations well beyond Toronto, observing that the standard for signings "keeps growing and the bar keeps getting higher" across the league. His own contribution was his second-best return in front of goal, and on April 24, 2022, against New York City FC, he became the first player to make 300 appearances for Toronto FC. The season turned in July, when a concussion sustained against the Chicago Fire developed into post-concussion syndrome after he had cleared the written protocol, leaving him with light sensitivity, headaches, pressure in his head, anxiety and stretches of unexplained sadness; he said he had felt "really, really off" and that the mental-health dimension proved the hardest part of the recovery, with his chances of reaching the World Cup looking bleak until roughly a fortnight before Canada's pre-tournament camp. His contract expired at the end of that season and, with interest from abroad and what he regarded as a last realistic chance to leave, he weighed his options over the winter before concluding that Toronto "presented itself as still the place where I need to be". The club announced a three-year deal with an option for 2026 that December.

==== Captaincy and club records (2023–2026) ====
In March 2023 the new contract was reclassified, making Osorio a Designated Player under the league's roster rules. The season collapsed around him: Bob Bradley left in late June with Toronto last in the Eastern Conference, Terry Dunfield took interim charge, and in August the club appointed John Herdman — who had managed Osorio with Canada — as head coach, effective from October 1. Osorio was named club captain on January 23, 2024, succeeding Michael Bradley. Toronto missed the playoffs for a fourth consecutive season in 2024 and finished 11th in the East; it was a difficult individual year for the captain, though he was identified as one of the few players the club should build around. Herdman resigned that November after a single season, and Robin Fraser, a Toronto assistant from 2015 to 2019, returned as head coach.

By February 2025 Osorio had made 371 appearances in all competitions, a club record, and stood one goal short of Major League Soccer's 50-goal, 50-assist club, having scored in 13 consecutive seasons; Fraser said he had "earned every single thing he's gotten", while teammate Alonso Coello called him "a historic player for the club and a historic player for the league, already". On March 22, 2026, in Toronto's 20th season and his 14th with the first team, he made his 400th appearance for the club in a 2–1 comeback win over the Columbus Crew at BMO Field, becoming the first Toronto FC player to reach the figure and only the third in league history to do so with a single club, after Graham Zusi and Diego Chará. Asked about the build-up to the milestone, he said he was "glad it's over with, honestly", adding that playing for his hometown club remained "a blessing every day"; Fraser said Osorio had "the same skill, but now it's paired with 10, 11, 12 years of experience, and he's just so much better".

== International career ==
=== Youth and early caps ===
Osorio made his debut for the Canada under-20 team in 2011, aged 18, at the 2011 CONCACAF U-20 Championship in Guatemala.

He received his first senior call-up on May 23, 2013, and debuted five days later as a second-half substitute for Samuel Piette in a 1–0 defeat to Costa Rica at Commonwealth Stadium. He was 20, joining a team still absorbing an 8–1 defeat to Honduras that had ended its previous World Cup campaign. He played eight times in 2013, including at the 2013 CONCACAF Gold Cup, and featured at the 2015 CONCACAF Gold Cup, where Canada went out in the group stage.

Between 2014 and 2017 he won only 11 caps, rarely selected by coach Benito Floro despite his form for Toronto. Osorio has said he was "kind of put to the side from the program for a couple of years." He scored his first international goal against Bermuda in January 2017 and played at that year's Gold Cup.

=== Herdman era and World Cup qualification ===
Osorio against Panama during 2022 World Cup qualifying in October 2021

That changed with the appointment of John Herdman in 2018. Osorio has described the coach's first phone call as a turning point: "He told me he believed in me and this meant a lot for me after being kind of away from the program ... To have that phone call from him, and to have him say I want you on the team and I see you as an important part, it meant a lot." He returned to regular selection, played at the 2019 and 2021 Gold Cups, reaching the semi-finals in 2021 before a 2–1 defeat to Mexico.

On October 7, 2021, he scored an equaliser against Mexico at the Estadio Azteca in a 1–1 draw — Canada's first goal at the stadium since 1980.

Canada sealed qualification on March 27, 2022, beating Jamaica 4–0 at BMO Field before a sell-out crowd to reach a World Cup for the first time in 36 years. Osorio carried a Canadian flag into the stands at the final whistle and returned with a drum, leading the call-and-response celebration that had become a fixture of Canada's home qualifiers. "As a Canadian kid, to dream of something like this was impossible," he said afterwards. "And to see it come to fruition is incredible." He later reflected that BMO Field was where he had realised both of his ambitions in the game: "winning MLS Cup for Toronto FC and then qualifying for the World Cup with Canada."

=== 2022 World Cup ===
Osorio playing against Belgium at the 2022 FIFA World Cup

Osorio was named in Canada's 26-man squad for the 2022 FIFA World Cup in November 2022 and appeared in all three group matches as the team went out at that stage. He was a substitute when Alphonso Davies scored Canada's first World Cup goal against Croatia, and has said that sprinting down the touchline at the Khalifa International Stadium to join the celebration was his favourite moment of the tournament, alongside hearing the national anthem before Canada's opening match.

Of the squad's wider significance he said: "I think the legacy is that we are pioneers really. We are really changing the landscape of the sport in this country, forever hopefully."

=== Nations League, Gold Cup and Copa América ===
Osorio against Argentina at the 2024 Copa América

On March 28, 2023, Osorio scored in a 4–1 win over Honduras at BMO Field that sent Canada to the Nations League final four, collecting a flick from Ayo Akinola, splitting the defence with one touch and finishing across the goalkeeper into the far corner. He was named in the squad for the finals in June, where Canada lost the final 2–0 to the United States, and went on to the 2023 CONCACAF Gold Cup.

He played at the 2024 Copa América, where Canada finished fourth, losing the third-place play-off to Uruguay 4–3 on penalties after a 2–2 draw.

=== 2026 World Cup ===
Osorio was selected for Canada's squad for the 2026 FIFA World Cup, co-hosted by Canada, Mexico and the United States. He came off the bench in the opening match on June 12, a 1–1 draw with Bosnia and Herzegovina in Toronto that earned Canada their first World Cup point. He was an unused substitute in a 6–0 win over Qatar, Canada's first World Cup victory, and in a 2–1 defeat to Switzerland that nonetheless took Canada into the knockout rounds for the first time, as Group B runners-up. He did not feature in a 1–0 win over South Africa in the round of 32, but appeared as a substitute in the 3–0 round-of-16 defeat to Morocco.

== Style of play ==
A central midfielder who arrived in the professional game as an attacking player, Osorio has described his own development as a shift from instinct toward game management: "I think when I came in as a young guy I was a young kid who was very determined, very driven and a little bit naive ... To now, I have gotten a lot smarter on the pitch and I am able to impact the game a lot more than I was before." His scoring has been unusually consistent for a midfielder, reaching double figures in all competitions in 2018 and 2022 and extending a run of scoring in 13 consecutive MLS seasons.

He has objected to being framed primarily through his nationality rather than his performance. "I think a lot, and I understand why when people speak about me and my success they talk about me as a Canadian, but I think sometimes it isn't fair," he said in 2023. "Why don't you speak to me as a player in the league, as a whole, against all other countries?"

== Personal life ==
Osorio is known around Toronto FC by the nickname "Oso" — Spanish for "bear", reflecting his family's Colombian roots — and carries a tattoo of a roaring grizzly running from his right shoulder to his bicep in reference to it. His younger brothers, Anthony and Nicholas, both progressed through the Toronto FC academy and played for Toronto FC II.

Osorio became engaged to his longtime partner, Michelle, in November 2024 after dating since late 2020, announcing the news the following month.

By October 2024, Osorio had spent three years partnering with the Canadian Colombian Children's Organization, helping fund a football field in Armenia, Colombia and a sports complex under construction in Barranquilla, and he donates four tickets to every Toronto FC home game to The Hospital for Sick Children.

== Career statistics ==
=== Club ===
As of match played November 7, 2026

Appearances and goals by club, season and competition
Club	Season	League			Playoffs		Canadian Championship		Continental		Other		Total	
Club	Season	Division	Apps	Goals	Apps	Goals	Apps	Goals	Apps	Goals	Apps	Goals	Apps	Goals
Toronto FC	2013	Major League Soccer	28	5	—		2	0	—		—		30	5
Toronto FC	2014	Major League Soccer	27	3	—		2	0	—		—		29	3
Toronto FC	2015	Major League Soccer	29	1	1	0	2	0	—		—		32	1
Toronto FC	2016	Major League Soccer	30	2	6	2	4	2	—		—		40	6
Toronto FC	2017	Major League Soccer	27	2	5	0	4	0	—		—		36	2
Toronto FC	2018	Major League Soccer	30	10	—		4	3	8 (Note: Appearances in CONCACAF Champions League)	4	1 (Note: Appearance in Campeones Cup)	0	43	17
Toronto FC	2019	Major League Soccer	24	5	4	2	4	0	2	0	—		34	7
Toronto FC	2020	Major League Soccer	17	1	1	0	—		—		1 (Note: Appearance in MLS is Back Tournament knockout stage)	0	19	1
Toronto FC	2021	Major League Soccer	24	4	—		3	1	2	1	—		29	6
Toronto FC	2022	Major League Soccer	23	9	—		3	1	—		—		26	10
Toronto FC	2023	Major League Soccer	21	4	—		0	0	—		2 (Note: Appearances in Leagues Cup)	0	23	4
Toronto FC	2024	Major League Soccer	22	2	—		4	1	—		3	0	29	3
Toronto FC	2025	Major League Soccer	24	4	—		1	0	—		—		25	4
Toronto FC	2026	Major League Soccer	25	1	—		1	0	—		—		26	1
Toronto FC	Career total		351	53	17	4	34	8	12	5	7	0	421	70

=== International ===
As of match played July 4, 2026

Appearances and goals by national team and year
National team	Year	Apps	Goals
Canada	2013	8	0
Canada	2014	1	0
Canada	2015	4	0
Canada	2016	3	0
Canada	2017	3	2
Canada	2018	3	1
Canada	2019	9	1
Canada	2020	3	1
Canada	2021	15	2
Canada	2022	11	0
Canada	2023	11	2
Canada	2024	11	0
Canada	2025	5	0
Canada	2026	5	1
Total		92	10

Scores and results list Canada's goal tally first.

List of international goals scored by Jonathan Osorio
No.	Date	Venue	Cap	Opponent	Score	Result	Competition
1.	January 22, 2017	Bermuda National Stadium, Hamilton, Bermuda	16	Bermuda	1–1	4–2	Friendly
2.	September 2, 2017	BMO Field, Toronto, Canada	18	Jamaica	2–0	2–0	Friendly
3.	September 9, 2018	IMG Academy, Bradenton, United States	21	U.S. Virgin Islands	1–0	8–0	2019–20 CONCACAF Nations League qualification
4.	September 7, 2019	BMO Field, Toronto, Canada	28	Cuba	4–0	6–0	2019–20 CONCACAF Nations League A
5.	January 7, 2020	Championship Soccer Stadium, Irvine, United States	32	Barbados	3–1	4–1	Friendly
6.	July 11, 2021	Children's Mercy Park, Kansas City, United States	38	Martinique	2–1	4–1	2021 CONCACAF Gold Cup
7.	October 7, 2021	Estadio Azteca, Mexico City, Mexico	45	Mexico	1–1	1–1	2022 FIFA World Cup qualification
8.	March 28, 2023	BMO Field, Toronto, Canada	62	Honduras	4–1	4–1	2022–23 CONCACAF Nations League A
9.	July 4, 2023	Shell Energy Stadium, Houston, United States	67	Cuba	2–0	4–2	2023 CONCACAF Gold Cup
10.	June 1, 2026	Commonwealth Stadium, Edmonton, Alberta, Canada	90	Uzbekistan	1–0	2–0	Friendly
Correct as of June 1, 2026

== Honours ==
Toronto FC

- MLS Cup: 2017
- Eastern Conference Championship (Playoffs): 2016, 2017, 2019
- Supporters' Shield: 2017
- Canadian Championship: 2016, 2017, 2018
- CONCACAF Champions League runner-up: 2018
- Trillium Cup: 2014, 2016, 2017, 2019, 2020, 2021

Canada

- CONCACAF Nations League runner-up: 2023

Individual

- CONCACAF Champions League Golden Boot: 2018
- CONCACAF Champions League Best XI: 2018
- George Gross Memorial Trophy: 2018
- Canadian Soccer League Rookie of the Year: 2012
- Red Patch Boys Player of the Year: 2018, 2023
