= Gabriel Boakye =

Canadian soccer player (born 1998)

Personal information
- Full name: Gabriel Boakye
- Date of birth: February 26, 1998 (age 28)
- Place of birth: Richmond Hill, Ontario, Canada
- Height: 1.75 m (5 ft 9 in)
- Position: Forward

Team information
- Current team: Vaughan Azzurri

Youth career
- 2006: Oak Ridges SC
- 2009: Richmond Hill SC
- 2011–2012: West Toronto SC
- 2012–2015: Toronto FC
- 2016–2017: Energie Cottbus

Senior career*
Years	Team	Apps	(Gls)
2015	Toronto FC III	13	(0)
2015	Toronto FC II	9	(0)
2017–2018	Energie Cottbus	17	(4)
2018–2020	1. FC Köln II	37	(1)
2020–2021	Lokomotive Leipzig	11	(2)
2021	FC Edmonton	6	(0)
2023	Simcoe County Rovers	3	(0)
2024–	Vaughan Azzurri	19	(3)

International career^{‡}
2015	Canada U17	5	(0)
2016–2017	Canada U20	6	(0)
- * Club domestic league appearances and goals as of August 29, 2025 ‡ National team caps and goals as of February 23, 2017

Gabriel Boakye (born February 26, 1998) is a Canadian soccer player who plays for Vaughan Azzurri in League1 Ontario. He plays as a forward.

== Club career ==
Boakye began playing soccer at the age of eight for Oakridges SC. In 2015, he joined TFC Academy in the Premier Development League and Toronto FC II in the United Soccer League and made thirteen and eight appearances respectively. On July 9, 2015, Boakye made his professional debut in a 2–0 defeat to Pittsburgh Riverhounds. He suffered a further six defeats, claiming only one victory in his time with the club. His final appearance came on September 17 in a 2–1 loss to Richmond Kickers. In November 2015, Boakye was one of two Toronto FC players for Under-17 Men's Player of the Year at the 2015 Canada Soccer Player Awards. The award was won by Vancouver Whitecap's Kadin Chung.

Boakye moved to Energie Cottbus in 2016, largely playing with the U-19 team. He made his first substitute appearance for the first team in December 2016. While at Energie Cottbus, Boakye would switch from a fullback, to a forward, earning positive review in the process as he scored 4 goals in 17 games while the club earned promotion to the 3. Liga.

After two seasons with Energie Cottbus, Boakye signed with 1. FC Köln II.

On July 25, 2020, Boakye signed a one-year contract with FC Lokomotive Leipzig.

On September 23, 2021, he joined FC Edmonton in the Canadian Premier League for the remainder of the 2021 season. On February 9, 2022, the club announced that Boakye and all but two other players would not be returning for the 2022 season.

In 2023, he played with the Simcoe County Rovers in League1 Ontario.

In 2024, he began playing with Vaughan Azzurri.

== International career ==
Boakye featured in the Canadian youth program for the first time in 2013 under coach Tony Fonseca. He was named to the U15 national team for the 2013 Copa de México de Naciones. He made his international debut during the CONCACAF Under-17 Championship. On February 28, 2015, he played 90 minutes a 3–1 victory over Haiti. He then followed up with a further four international appearances over the next few weeks. His final outing came on March 15, when suffering a 3–0 defeat to Costa Rica. In February 2017, Boakye was named to Canada's roster for the 2017 CONCACAF U-20 Championship Boakye was named to the Canadian U-23 provisional roster for the 2020 CONCACAF Men's Olympic Qualifying Championship on February 26, 2020.

== Personal life ==
Boakye's father was born in Kumasi, Ghana, while his mother was born in Accra, Ghana. As a result, he is eligible to represent Canada or Ghana.
