= Phil Di Bennardo =

Canadian professional soccer player

Personal information
- Full name: Filippo Di Bennardo
- Date of birth: April 20, 1997 (age 29)
- Place of birth: Toronto, Ontario, Canada
- Height: 1.77 m (5 ft 10 in)
- Position: Goalkeeper

Youth career
- Woodbridge Strikers
- Toronto FC

Senior career*
Years	Team	Apps	(Gls)
2015–2017	Toronto FC III	7	(0)
2015–2016	Toronto FC II	9	(0)
- * Club domestic league appearances and goals as of May 6, 2017

Filippo "Phil" Di Bennardo (born April 20, 1997) is a Canadian professional soccer player who plays as a goalkeeper.

== Career ==
=== Club ===
Di Bennardo started his career with Woodbridge SC at the age of four. He later joined the Toronto FC Academy. He joined affiliate club Toronto FC II on loan during the 2015 USL season, where he made two appearances. He made his professional debut on September 5, 2015, in a 3–2 victory over FC Montreal, before also featuring in a 3–2 defeat to Rochester Rhinos on September 25.

=== International ===
Di Bennardo's first international involvement came at the age of 15, when he was selected by Michael Findlay for the Mexico Cup of Nations Under-15 squad in 2012. His next opportunity came in 2015, when Rob Gale included him in an Under-20 development camp in Mexico. However, the goalkeeper is yet to make an international appearance.
