= Skylar Thomas =

Canadian soccer player (born 1993)

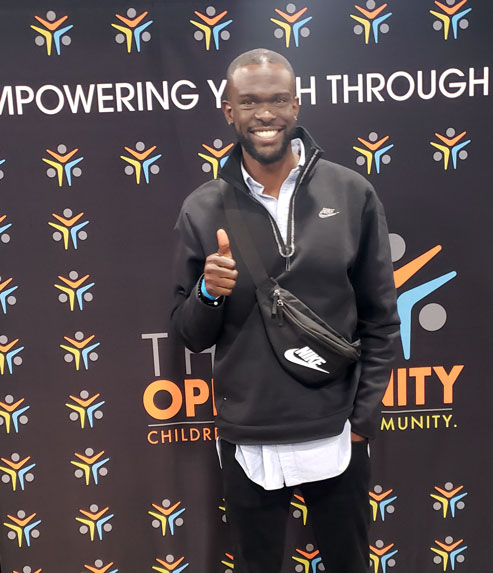
- Thomas in 2022

Personal information
- Full name: Skylar Rutherford Thomas
- Date of birth: July 27, 1993 (age 33)
- Place of birth: Scarborough, Ontario, Canada
- Height: 1.93 m (6 ft 4 in)
- Position: Centre-back

Youth career
- Pickering SC
- 2012: Toronto FC

College career
| Years | Team | Apps | (Gls) |
| 2011–2014 | Syracuse Orange | 56 | (8) |

Senior career*
| Years | Team | Apps | (Gls) |
| 2014 | Reading United | 6 | (0) |
| 2015–2016 | Toronto FC II | 47 | (4) |
| 2017–2018 | Charleston Battery | 49 | (1) |
| 2019 | Valour FC | 22 | (0) |
| 2020 | Pittsburgh Riverhounds | 16 | (1) |
| 2021 | Memphis 901 | 29 | (2) |

International career
| 2015–2016 | Canada U23 | 7 | (1) |
- * Club domestic league appearances and goals

Skylar Rutherford Thomas (born July 27, 1993) is a former Canadian professional soccer player.

== Club career ==
=== Early career ===
Thomas began playing soccer at age six with Pickering SC.

Thomas attended Syracuse University for four years, playing for the Orange. During his senior year at Syracuse in 2014, he was named All-ACC Second Team and NSCAA All-South Region Second Team. In 2012, he played with TFC Academy in the Canadian Soccer League.

=== Toronto FC II ===
Thomas was drafted in the first round, 11th overall, in the 2015 MLS SuperDraft by Toronto FC on January 15, 2015. On March 12 it was announced that he had signed with Toronto's affiliate team, Toronto FC II in the USL ahead of their inaugural season. He made his debut on April 19 against Whitecaps FC 2 as a substitute for Daniel Fabrizi.

=== Charleston Battery ===
Thomas would sign with Charleston Battery for the 2017 season, and would appear in 8 of the team's 13 clean sheets. Upon completion of the 2017 season, Thomas would have his option with the club exercised for the 2018 season.

=== Valour FC ===
Thomas signed for Canadian Premier League club Valour FC in November 2018, having played previously for head coach Rob Gale with the Canadian U-23 national team. Upon signing with Valour, Thomas indicated he wanted to be a part of building the league.

=== Pittsburgh Riverhounds ===
On February 25, 2020, Thomas joined Pittsburgh Riverhounds SC ahead of the 2020 season.

=== Memphis 901 ===
On March 22, 2021, Thomas moved to USL Championship side Memphis 901.

== International career ==
Thomas has represented Canada at the U18 and U20 level, appearing in camps for both in 2011 and 2012, respectively.

In May 2016, Thomas was called to Canada's U23 national team for a pair of friendlies against Guyana and Grenada. He saw action in both matches.

== Personal life ==
Thomas was born in Scarborough, Ontario, to a Canadian mother and a Trinidadian father. When he was five, his family moved to Pickering. In 2019, Thomas joined the athletics ambassador team for a children's charity organization known as Their Opportunity.
