= Emeka Ononye =

Canadian soccer player

Personal information
- Full name: Emeka Ononye
- Date of birth: 1992 or 1993 (age 33–34)
- Place of birth: Richmond Hill, Ontario, Canada
- Height: 1.91 m (6 ft 3 in)
- Position: Defender

Team information
- Current team: Toronto FC II
- Number: 59

Youth career
- 2007–2008: Markham Lightning
- 2008–2011: ANB Futbol

College career
| Years | Team | Apps | (Gls) |
| 2011–2014 | Wright State Raiders | 76 | (7) |

Senior career*
| Years | Team | Apps | (Gls) |
| 2014 | K-W United FC | 14 | (0) |
| 2015 | Toronto FC II | 13 | (0) |
- * Club domestic league appearances and goals as of September 25, 2015

Emeka Ononye is a Canadian soccer player who last played for Toronto FC II in the USL.

== Club career ==
=== College and amateur ===
Ononye played at Wright State University for four years. He made 76 appearances, scoring 7 goals. In his junior year Ononye received Second Team All-Horizon League honors and in his senior year he earned First Team All-Horizon League and was selected to NSCAA Third Team All-Great Lakes Region.

In 2014, he played with PDL side K-W United FC and made 14 appearances.

=== Professional ===
After trialling with USL side Toronto FC II, he was signed to a contract on April 29, 2015. He made his debut on May 14 against St. Louis FC. Ononye was let go at the end of the 2015 season as his contract was not renewed .
