= Salvador Bernal (footballer) =

Mexican footballer (born 1992)

Sal Bernal
Personal information
- Full name: Salvador Bernal Flores
- Date of birth: August 13, 1992 (age 34)
- Place of birth: Morelia, Mexico
- Height: 1.70 m (5 ft 7 in)
- Position: Forward

Youth career
- Neusport FC

College career
Years	Team	Apps	(Gls)
2011–2014	UNLV Rebels	72	(26)

Senior career*
Years	Team	Apps	(Gls)
2014	Las Vegas Mobsters	12	(5)
2015–2016	Toronto FC II	35	(3)
2017	Las Vegas Mobsters		
- * Club domestic league appearances and goals as of August 7, 2016

Salvador Bernal Flores (born August 13, 1992) is a Mexican former footballer.

== Early life ==
Bernal was born in Mexico and moved to the United States at age seven, earning a work permit through the DACA program. Bernal played youth soccer with Neusport FC in Las Vegas, winning multiple state cup titles. He attended Ed W. Clark High School, where he holds the school record for most goals in a season, was named a two-time region player of the year in 2009 and 2010, and earned first team all-state honors, while leading Clark High to a conference championship and the state semifinals.

== College career ==
In 2011, Bernal began attending the University of Nevada, Las Vegas, where he played for the men's soccer team. He scored his first collegiate goal on September 3, 2011, against the Cal State Fullerton Titans. On October 16, 2011, he scored a brace against the Denver Pioneers. In his freshman season, he led the team in scoring with 14 points and was named the MPSF Newcomer of the Year, was named an All-MPSF First Team All-Star and College Soccer News All-Freshman Third Team honors. In his sophomore season, he earned NSCAA All-Far West Third Team honors and was named to the All-MPSF First Team for the second consecutive year.

In his junior season, he once again was named to the NSCAA All-Far West Region Third Team, as well as being named to the All-WAC First Team. On August 31, 2014, scored a hat trick against in a 4–3 victory over the Bradley Braves, a performance which earned him national Team of the Week honors. In his senior season, he helped UNLV win the WAC title and was named a College Soccer News 2014 Men's Second Team All-American and a NSCAA Third Team All-American. He was also named to the NSCAA All-Far West Region First Team, the WAC Offensive Player of the Year, and an All-WAC First Team, becoming the first player in team history to be named first-team all-conference all four years. He was also named the UNLV Sportsman of the Year for the 2014–15 season. After the season, he was invited to the MLS Combine, ahead of the MLS SuperDraft. Over his four years, he made a total of 72 appearances for the Rebels, scoring 26 goals and adding 16 assists.

== Club career ==
In 2014, Bernal played with the Las Vegas Mobsters in the Premier Development League.

In January 2015, Bernal was selected in the fourth round (70th overall) of the 2015 MLS SuperDraft by Toronto FC. In March 2015, he signed a professional contract with the second team, Toronto FC II in the USL. After missing the beginning of the season due to visa issues, Bernal made his professional debut on July 24, 2015, in a 1–0 win against the Charleston Battery. He scored his first professional goals on September 19, 2015, scoring both goals in a 2–2 draw against the Wilmington Hammerheads.

In 2017, he returned to the Las Vegas Mobsters, now in the United Premier Soccer League.
