= Adam Bouchard =

Canadian soccer player (born 1996)

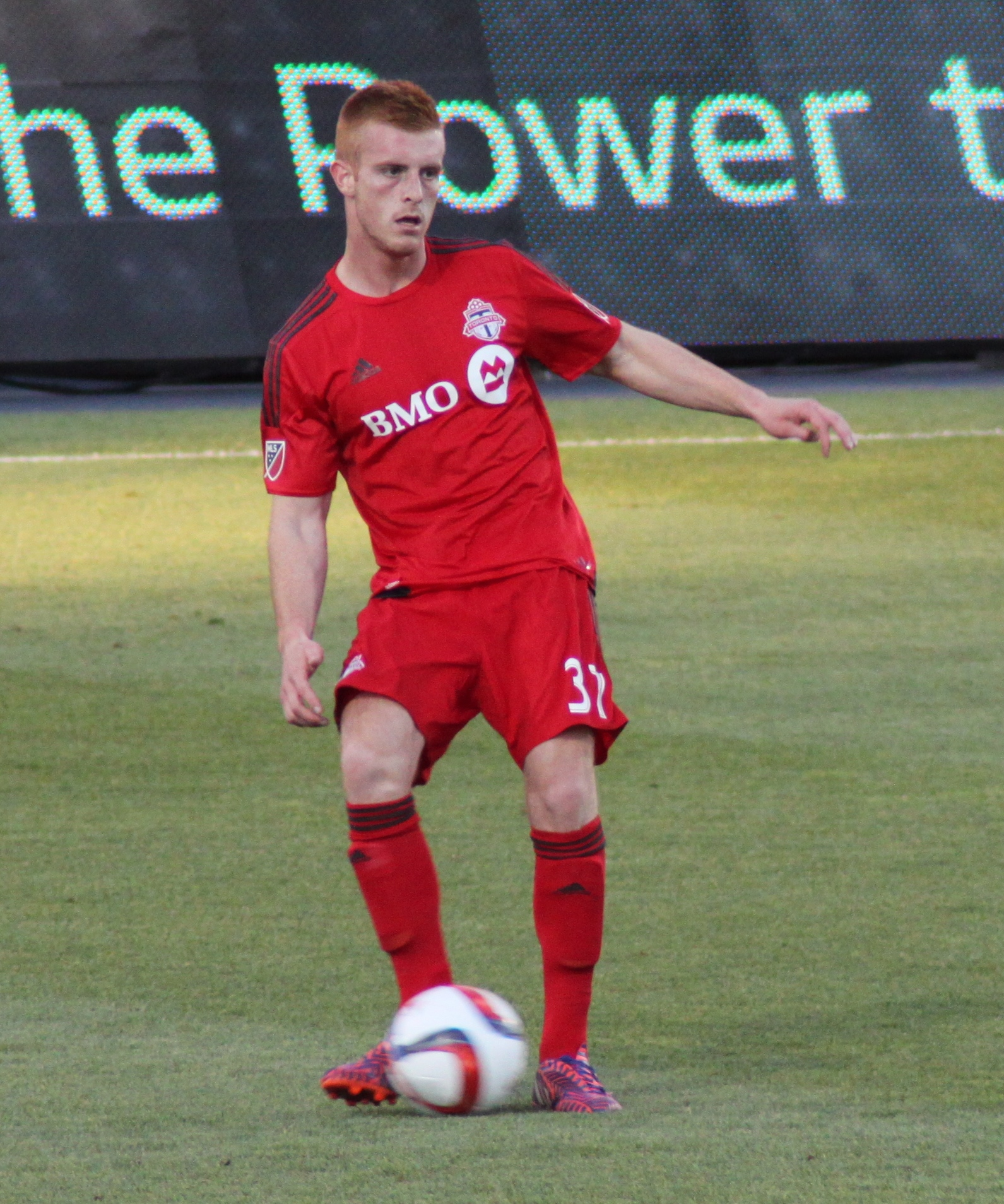
- Bouchard with Toronto FC in 2015

Personal information
- Full name: Adam Samuel Bouchard
- Date of birth: March 12, 1996 (age 30)
- Place of birth: Oakville, Ontario, Canada
- Height: 1.83 m (6 ft 0 in)
- Positions: Midfielder; defender

Team information
- Current team: Toronto FC
- Number: 37

Youth career
- Oakville SC
- 2013–2014: Defensor Sporting
- 2014: Toronto FC

Senior career*
Years	Team	Apps	(Gls)
2015–2016	Toronto FC II	24	(0)

International career^{‡}
2015	Canada U23	2	(0)
- * Club domestic league appearances and goals as of January 7, 2017 ‡ National team caps and goals as of January 14, 2020

Adam Samuel Bouchard (born March 12, 1996) is a Canadian soccer player who last played for Toronto FC II in the USL.

== Club career ==
=== Early career ===
In April 2013 he and two teammates (including Nicolás Galvis) left Oakville SC to sign for Uruguayan club Defensor Sporting. After a year in Uruguay, he returned to Canada and joined TFC Academy in October 2014.

=== Toronto FC II ===
Bouchard signed his first professional contract with Toronto FC II, Toronto FC's reserve team, on March 20, 2015. He made his debut on March 21 against the Charleston Battery.

== International career ==
Bouchard was named to the Canadian roster for the 2013 FIFA U-17 World Cup. He also participated in a U-20 camp in May 2014.
