= Patrick Slogic =

American soccer player

Personal information
- Full name: Patrick David Slogic
- Date of birth: September 13, 1991 (age 35)
- Place of birth: Okinawa, Japan
- Height: 6 ft 6 in (1.98 m)
- Position: Defender

Youth career
- 2007–2010: Colorado Rapids

College career
Years	Team	Apps	(Gls)
2010–2013	Cornell Big Red	65	(8)

Senior career*
Years	Team	Apps	(Gls)
2013	Reading United	4	(1)
2014	Rochester Rhinos	16	(0)
2015–2016	Charlotte Independence	52	(6)
- * Club domestic league appearances and goals as of September 29, 2016

Patrick David Slogic (born September 13, 1991, in Okinawa, Japan) is an American soccer player.

== Career ==
=== College and amateur ===
Slogic played fours years of college soccer at Cornell University between 2010 and 2013, while earning his degree in Environmental Engineering from Cornell's College of Engineering in 7 semesters.

While at college, Slogic also appeared for USL PDL club Reading United AC in 2013.

=== Professional ===
Slogic was drafted by the Columbus Crew of the MLS in 2014 after playing in the 2014 MLS Player Combine.

Slogic signed his first professional deal with USL Pro club Rochester Rhinos on April 4, 2014, after playing with the Columbus Crew.

Slogic joined the expansion Charlotte Independence for the 2015 season.

Slogic was inducted into the Cornell University Hall of Fame in September 2024.
