= Massimo Mirabelli =

Canadian soccer player (born 1991)

Personal information
- Full name: Massimo Mirabelli
- Date of birth: 21 October 1991 (age 35)
- Place of birth: Brampton, Ontario, Canada
- Height: 1.80 m (5 ft 11 in)
- Positions: Midfielder; forward

Youth career
- Vaughan Azzurri

Senior career*
Years	Team	Apps	(Gls)
2010–2011	SC Toronto	36	(15)
2012	Ekenäs	25	(7)
2013–2014	FC Edmonton	24	(2)
2015	Toronto FC II	24	(2)
2016–2018	Vaughan Azzurri	10	(4)
2018–2019	Caribbean Stars AC (indoor)		
2018–2019	Mississauga MetroStars (indoor)	11	(1)

International career
2011	Canada U20	2	(0)
- * Club domestic league appearances and goals as of 23 November 2019

Massimo Mirabelli (born 21 October 1991) is a Canadian soccer player who last played professionally for arena soccer team Mississauga MetroStars of the Major Arena Soccer League.

== Club career ==
Mirabelli began his career with Portugal FC of the Canadian Soccer League in 2010. He recorded his first goal for the organization on June 25, 2010, in a 3–2 victory over Milltown F.C. He scored his first professional hat-trick in a match against Brantford Galaxy. He assisted in Portugal's qualification for the postseason by finishing fifth on the overall standings. He contributed with a goal in the semi-final match against Brantford Galaxy, but Portugal was eliminated from the playoffs after losing that match to a score of 5–3. Mirabelli returned to Toronto for the 2011 season and clinched his first regular season title with the club. In the quarterfinals of the playoffs he scored two goals in a 4–3 victory over York Region Shooters, but their match went into penalties as their two-game series was tied by a score of 4–4 on goals on aggregate, and subsequently Toronto would lose in the penalty shootout.

In 2012, he signed with Ekenäs IF of the Kakkonen in Finland. Mirabelli signed with FC Edmonton of the North American Soccer League on 4 March 2013 after impressing the club while on trials. On 6 April 2013 he made his debut for the club against the Fort Lauderdale Strikers in which he came on in the 87th minute for Shaun Saiko as Edmonton drew the match 1–1.

Mirabelli joined Toronto FC II on March 20, 2015. He made his debut against the Charleston Battery on March 21. Mirabelli was let go at the end of the 2015 season as his contract was not renewed .

In 2016, Mirabelli signed with League1 Ontario side Vaughan Azzurri, making five league appearances and scoring two goals that season. In 2018, he made added another five appearances and two goals in league play, and made another two appearances in the playoffs, scoring one goal. In the winter of 2018–19, he played indoor soccer in the Mississauga-based Arena Premier League with the Caribbean Stars AC.

== International career ==
In 2011 Mirabelli played with the Canada U20s during the 2011 CONCACAF U-20 Championship in Guatemala.

== Career statistics ==
=== Club ===
Statistics accurate as of November 2, 2014

Club	Season	League		Domestic Cup		Other		Continental		Total	
Club	Season	Apps	Goals	Apps	Goals	Apps	Goals	Apps	Goals	Apps	Goals
FC Edmonton	2013	19	2	1	0	0	0	—	—	20	2
FC Edmonton	2014	5	0	2	0	0	0	—	—	7	0
Toronto FC II	2015	24	2	—	—	—	—	—	—	24	2
Career total		48	4	3	0	0	0	0	0	51	4
