= Clément Simonin =

French footballer (born 1991)

Personal information
- Date of birth: 1 July 1991 (age 35)
- Place of birth: Ploemeur, France
- Height: 1.85 m (6 ft 1 in)
- Position: Defender

Youth career
- 1998–2003: Amicale Laïque Ploemeur
- 2003–2010: Lorient

College career
| Years | Team | Apps | (Gls) |
| 2011–2012 | Lander Bearcats | 32 | (2) |
| 2013–2014 | NC State Wolfpack | 24 | (4) |

Senior career*
| Years | Team | Apps | (Gls) |
| 2009–2010 | Lorient B | | |
| 2010–2011 | Concarneau | | |
| 2012–2013 | Carolina Dynamo | 24 | (0) |
| 2014 | Seattle Sounders FC U-23 | 8 | (0) |
| 2015 | Toronto FC II | 1 | (0) |
| 2015–2016 | Toronto FC | 2 | (0) |
| 2015–2016 | → Toronto FC II (loan) | 11 | (0) |
| 2017–2018 | Concarneau | 1 | (0) |
| 2017–2018 | Concarneau II | 10 | (0) |
| 2019 | US Bretons de Paris | 11 | (0) |
- * Club domestic league appearances and goals

Clément Simonin (born 1 July 1991) is a French retired footballer who played as a defender.

== Career ==
=== Youth ===
Simonin was a member of FC Lorient from ages 12–19, making it to the club's reserve squad before being cut. Before his 12 he played for AL Ploemeur.

=== College and amateur ===
Simonin spent the first two seasons of his college career at Lander University where he made a total of 32 and tallied two goals and three assists. He also helped lead the Bearcats to a Peach Belt Conference regular season title in 2012. After two seasons with the Bearcats, he transferred to North Carolina State University. In his first season with the Wolfpack, he made 17 appearances and finished the year with four goals and one assist. In his senior season, he made only seven appearances due to injury.

During his time in college, Simonin also played in the PDL for Carolina Dynamo and Seattle Sounders FC U-23.

=== Professional ===
On 15 January 2015, Simonin was taken ninth overall in the 2015 MLS SuperDraft by Toronto FC. He was one of three players selected by the Reds in the first round. He ended up signing with USL affiliate club Toronto FC II on 12 March. He made his professional debut for the club on 21 March against the Charleston Battery. After his debut, with a rash of injuries to Toronto FC's defense, Simonin was signed to an MLS deal on 27 March. He went on to make his professional Major League Soccer debut on 29 March against Real Salt Lake. He was injured in that game, and as a result has only played in one other game for Toronto FC, who declined in contract option at the end of the 2016 season.

Simonin joined Concarneau in the summer 2017.

As of July 1, 2018, Simonin is retired, but he joined a non-professional side US Bretons de Paris in 2019.
