= Daniel Fabrizi =

Canadian soccer player (born 1992)

Personal information
- Full name: Daniel Fabrizi
- Date of birth: February 22, 1992 (age 34)
- Place of birth: Brampton, Ontario, Canada
- Height: 1.91 m (6 ft 3 in)
- Position: Defender

Youth career
- 2009–2010: Toronto FC

College career
Years	Team	Apps	(Gls)
2010–2014	York Lions		

Senior career*
Years	Team	Apps	(Gls)
2011–2012	SC Toronto		
2014	Vaughan Azzurri		
2015	Toronto FC II	18	(0)
- * Club domestic league appearances and goals

Daniel Fabrizi (born February 22, 1992) is a Canadian soccer player who played as a defender.

== Club career ==
=== College soccer ===
Fabrizi played for York University for four years. In his final year in 2014, York won both the OUA and CIS championships, with Fabrizi earning OUA West first-team all-star honours.

=== CSL ===
In 2009, he played in the Canadian Soccer League with TFC Academy. He would sign on for the 2010 season. The following season, he departed from Toronto FC's youth system to play with league rivals SC Toronto. In his debut season with Toronto, he helped the club secure the league's first division title. Toronto would ultimately be eliminated in the first round of the playoffs by the York Region Shooters.

He returned to play with Toronto for the 2012 season. For the second consecutive season, he assisted Toronto in clinching a postseason berth by finishing third in the first division. Toronto's playoff journey was short-lived as they were eliminated from the competition in the first round by the Serbian White Eagles.

After the conclusion of the 2012 season, he had a trial run with FC Edmonton of the North American Soccer League. In the winter of 2013, he was invited to train with Toronto FC during preseason camp. Fabrizi's time in the preseason camp resulted in the defender playing in the 2013 Walt Disney World Pro Soccer Classic against the Columbus Crew.

=== Vaughan Azzurri ===
In 2014, he played with Vaughan Azzurri in League1 Ontario, being named to the League1 Next XI at the end of the season.

=== USL ===
Fabrizi signed his first professional contract with Toronto FC II on March 20, 2015. He made his debut for the club against the Charleston Battery on March 21. Fabrizi was let go at the end of the 2015 season as his contract was not renewed. In total, he appeared in 18 matches.

== Honors ==
SC Toronto

- Canadian Soccer League First Division: 2011

York Lions

- CIS championship: 2014
- OUA championship: 2013, 2014
