= FC Montreal =

FC Montréal
- Founded: November 18, 2014; 11 years ago
- Dissolved: December 9, 2016; 9 years ago
- Stadium: Complexe sportif Claude-Robillard; Montreal, Quebec
- Capacity: 3,500
- Owner: Joey Saputo
- Head coach: Philippe Eullaffroy
- League: USL Championship
Home colours

FC Montreal was a Canadian professional soccer team based in Montreal, Quebec, Canada that played in the USL Championship, the third tier of the United States soccer league system. The team served as a reserve team of Major League Soccer (MLS) club, Montreal Impact. The original Montreal Impact had previously operated a reserve team called the Trois-Rivières Attak in the Canadian Soccer League from 2007 until 2009, followed by the Academy U21 from 2010 to 2012. The Montreal Impact U23 played in the PDL in 2014.

== Overview ==
FC Montreal played their home games at Saputo Stadium and surrounding training fields in their first season, and at Complexe sportif Claude-Robillard in their second, after undergoing renovations. The games were open to the public, free of charge.

On December 9, 2016, the Montreal Impact signed an affiliation agreement with Ottawa Fury FC, which had recently joined the USL. As a result, FC Montréal was disbanded.

== Record ==
Year by year

Year	Division	League	Record (W–D–L)	Playoffs	Avg. attendance
2015	3	USL	10th, Eastern: 8–4–16	did not qualify	411
2016	3	USL	14th, Eastern: 7–2–21	did not qualify	243
