= 2017 Rochester Rhinos season =

Rochester Rhinos
2017 season
- Owners: David and Wendy Dworkin
- Head coach: Bob Lilley
- Stadium: Capelli Sport Stadium
- USL: 4th, Eastern Conference
- USL Playoffs: Conference semifinals
- U.S. Open Cup: Fourth Round
- Highest home attendance: 3,459 (4/22 vs. NYRB2)
- Lowest home attendance: 963 (10/10 vs. BST)
- Average home league attendance: 2,031
- Biggest win: ROC 4–0 CLT (4/29)
- Biggest defeat: CHS 5–0 ROC (4/15)
Home colors	Away colors	Third colors

The 2017 Rochester Rhinos season was the club's 22nd overall and seventh with the United Soccer League, now known as the USL Championship. The Rhinos returned to playing in Division II of men's professional soccer, as the USL and all its teams were promoted from Division III after the 2016 season. They looked to return to the USL playoffs after losing to the New York Red Bulls II in the conference semifinals the previous year.

This was the Rhinos' final season in the second tier of American professional soccer. The team initially announced that it would go on hiatus for the 2018 season. It later announced that it would not resume professional operations until 2020, at which time it will join USL League One, a third-level league operated by USL's parent company, United Soccer League (not to be confused with the Rhinos' former league), that will play its first season in 2019.

== Roster ==
as of June 25, 2017

No.	Position	Nation	Player
1	GK	USA	Kyle Morton
2	DF	USA	Raymond Lee
3	DF	USA	Ryan Felix
4	DF	FRA	Bradley Kamdem
5	MF	CAN	Jordan Dover
6	FW	HAI	Christiano François
7	MF	CAN	Ryan James
8	MF	GUY	Brandon Beresford
9	MF	USA	Stefan Defregger
10	MF	FRA	Sofiane Tergou
11	MF	JAM	Kenardo Forbes
12	FW	USA	Jochen Graf
13	MF	USA	Mike Garzi
15	DF	USA	Joe Farrell
17	DF	GER	Wal Fall
18	FW	CPV	Antonio Correia
20	DF	USA	Todd Pratzner
21	FW	USA	Darius Madison
22	MF	USA	Jalen Brown
23	GK	USA	Tomas Gomez
24	FW	FRA	Rayane Boukemia
25	DF	JAM	Sergio Campbell
29	MF	CMR	Samuel Edoung-Biyo
33	GK	USA	Daniel Lynd

== Competitions ==
=== Regular season ===
==== Standings ====
Eastern Conference

Pos	Team	Pld	W	D	L	GF	GA	GD	Pts	Qualification
1	Louisville City FC (C)	32	18	8	6	58	31	+27	62	Conference Playoffs
2	Charleston Battery	32	15	9	8	53	33	+20	54	Conference Playoffs
3	Tampa Bay Rowdies	32	14	11	7	50	35	+15	53	Conference Playoffs
4	Rochester Rhinos	32	14	11	7	36	28	+8	53	Conference Playoffs
5	Charlotte Independence	32	13	9	10	52	40	+12	48	Conference Playoffs
6	FC Cincinnati	32	12	10	10	46	48	−2	46	Conference Playoffs
7	New York Red Bulls II	32	13	5	14	57	60	−3	44	Conference Playoffs
8	Bethlehem Steel FC	32	12	8	12	46	45	+1	44	Conference Playoffs
9	Orlando City B	32	10	12	10	37	36	+1	42	
10	Ottawa Fury	32	8	14	10	42	41	+1	38	
11	Harrisburg City Islanders	32	10	7	15	28	47	−19	37	
12	Saint Louis FC	32	9	9	14	35	48	−13	36	
13	Pittsburgh Riverhounds	32	8	12	12	33	42	−9	36	
14	Richmond Kickers	32	8	8	16	24	36	−12	32	
15	Toronto FC II	32	6	7	19	27	54	−27	25	

Source: 2017 USL standings
Rules for classification: 1) total wins; 2) total goal differential; 3) total goals scored; 4) points earned against top four Conference finishers; 5) disciplinary points; 6) coin toss or drawing of lots
(C) Champions

==== Match results ====
Win Draw Loss

All times in Eastern Time.

April 1 1	Bethlehem Steel FC	2–3	Rochester Rhinos	Bethlehem, Pennsylvania
4:00 PM EDT (UTC−4)	Davies 45+3' (pen.); Conneh 72' (pen.)	Report	Madison 9'; Fall 34'; Graf 88'	Stadium: Goodman Stadium; Attendance: 3,102; Referee: Jorge Ramírez

April 7 2	Toronto FC II	0–0	Rochester Rhinos	Vaughan, Ontario
7:30 PM EDT (UTC−4)	Spencer (yellow card) 80'	Report	Beresford (yellow card) 55'; Fall (yellow card) 90+3'	Stadium: Ontario Soccer Centre; Attendance: 525; Referee: David Barrie

April 15 3	Charleston Battery	5–0	Rochester Rhinos	Charleston, South Carolina
7:00 PM EDT (UTC−4)	Williams 15', 25', 26'; Guerra 31'; Chang 81'; Thomas (yellow card) 82'; Anunga (yellow card) 88'; Mueller (yellow card) 89'	Report	Fall (yellow card) 56'; James (yellow card) 59'	Stadium: MUSC Health Stadium; Attendance: 2,421; Referee: Howard Ashe

April 22 4	Rochester Rhinos	2–2	New York Red Bulls II	Rochester, New York
6:05 PM EDT (UTC−4)	Garzi 45+1'; Farrell 90+4'	Report	Allen 50'; Bezecourt 65'	Stadium: Capelli Sport Stadium; Attendance: 3,459; Referee: Geoff Gamble

April 29 5	Rochester Rhinos	4–0	Charlotte Independence	Rochester, New York
5:05 PM EDT (UTC−4)	Fall 27', (yellow card) 48'; Garzi (yellow card) 44', (goal) 46'; Madison 52'; Felix (yellow card) 56'; Forbes 85' (pen.)	Report	Davidson (yellow card) 25'; Johnson (yellow card) 37'; Herrera (yellow card) 90+2'	Stadium: Capelli Sport Stadium; Attendance: 1,941; Referee: Greg Dopka

21 May 6	Rochester Rhinos	1–1	Richmond Kickers	Rochester, New York
4:05 PM EDT (UTC−4)	Beresford (yellow card) 16'; Forbes 32'; Farrell (yellow card) 73'; Felix (yellow card) 85'	Report	Gonzalez 45'; Asante (yellow card) 81'	Stadium: Capelli Sport Stadium; Attendance: 2,003; Referee: Henrik Karlsson

24 May 7	Rochester Rhinos	1–0	Tampa Bay Rowdies	Rochester, New York
7:05 PM EDT (UTC−4)	Fall 24'; Garzi (yellow card) 39'	Report	Hristov (yellow card) 33'; Lowe (yellow card) 55'; Nanchoff (yellow card) 81'	Stadium: Capelli Sport Stadium; Attendance: 1,140; Referee: Matthew Franz

June 3 8	Rochester Rhinos	1–0	FC Cincinnati	Rochester, New York
6:00 PM EDT (UTC−4)	Kamdem 65'	CIN Report; ROC Report; Box Score	Walker (yellow card) 63'; Halfhill (yellow card) 90'	Stadium: Capelli Sport Stadium; Attendance: 2,158; Referee: Jorge Ramirez; Assistant referees: Gabriel Angelone; Ankur Singh; Fourth official: Anthony Perdue

June 7 9	Orlando City B	1–1	Rochester Rhinos	Orlando, Florida
6:30 PM EDT (UTC−4)	Hines (yellow card) 3'; Barry 23'; Laryea (yellow card) 64'	Report	Correia 25'; Fall (yellow card) 63'	Stadium: Orlando City Stadium; Attendance: 967; Referee: Jonathan Weiner

June 10 10	Tampa Bay Rowdies	1–1	Rochester Rhinos	St. Petersburg, Florida
7:30 EDT (UTC−4)	Cole 19'; Collins (yellow card) 28'; Savage (yellow card) 58'; Nanchoff (yellow card) 89'	Report	Graf 5'; Fall (yellow card) 68'; Kamdem (yellow card) 78'	Stadium: Al Lang Stadium; Attendance: 6,026; Referee: Kevin Broadley

June 17 11	Rochester Rhinos	1–0	Ottawa Fury	Rochester, New York
6:05 PM EDT (UTC-04:00)	Felix 19', (yellow card) 28'; Farrell (yellow card) 78'; Tergou (yellow card) 90+4'	Report		Stadium: Capelli Sport Stadium; Attendance: 2,548; Referee: Lorant Varga

June 23 12	Rochester Rhinos	0–1	Orlando City B	Rochester, New York
6:00 PM EDT (UTC-04:00)	Defregger (yellow card) 29'; Dover (yellow card) 88'	Report	Timbó 18', (yellow card) 45+1'	Stadium: Capelli Sport Stadium; Attendance: 1,243; Referee: Charles Murphy

July 1 13	Charlotte Independence	2–1	Rochester Rhinos	Charlotte, North Carolina
6:00 P.M. EDT (UTC−4)	Estrada 12', 25'; Ross (yellow card) 32'	Report	Farrell (yellow card) 14'; Fall 67' (pen.)	Stadium: Matthews Sportsplex; Attendance: 1,623; Referee: Gustavo Solorio

July 5 14	Saint Louis FC	0–0	Rochester Rhinos	Fenton, Missouri
8:00 PM EDT (UTC−4)	Sheldon (yellow card) 66'	Report	Lee (yellow card) 60'	Stadium: World Wide Technology Soccer Park; Attendance: 4,634; Referee: Dule Djurasevic
Note: Re-scheduled from May 6 due to flooding of World Wide Technology Soccer Park

July 8 15	Rochester Rhinos	1–0	Harrisburg City Islanders	Rochester, New York
6:05 PMEDT (UTC−4)	Madison (yellow card) 35'; Graf 85'	Report		Stadium: Capelli Sport Stadium; Attendance: 2,178; Referee: Ismir Pekmic

July 15 16	Ottawa Fury	1–1	Rochester Rhinos	Ottawa, Ontario
2:00 PM EDT (UTC-04:00)	Barden (yellow card) 33'; Bruna (yellow card) 72'; Hume 89'	Report	Graf 15'; Garzi (yellow card) 39'	Stadium: TD Place Stadium; Attendance: 5,525; Referee: Chris Grabas

July 22 17	Rochester Rhinos	0–0	Pittsburgh Riverhounds	Rochester, New York
6:05 PM EDT (UTC-04:00)		Report	Adewole (yellow card) 33'; Souto (yellow card) 73'	Stadium: Capelli Sport Stadium; Attendance: 3,269; Referee: Jaroslaw Werel

July 26 18	Rochester Rhinos	2–0	Toronto FC II	Rochester, New York
7:05 PM EDT (UTC-04:00)	Defregger 58', (yellow card) 59'; Dunn 76' (o.g.); Correia (yellow card) 90+3'	Report	Onkony (red card) 26'	Stadium: Capelli Sport Stadium; Attendance: 2,148; Referee: Jared Simons

July 29 19	FC Cincinnati	2–3	Rochester Rhinos	Cincinnati, Ohio
7:00 PM EDT (UTC-04:00)	McLaughlin 29'; Djiby (yellow card) 27', (yellow card) 42' (red card); Josu (yellow card) 44'; Berry (yellow card) 81'; Jaye (red card) 84'; König 86' (pen.); Greig (yellow card) 87'; Walker (yellow card) 90+2'	Report	Graf 12'; Kamdem (yellow card) 54'; Fall 78' (pen.) (yellow card) 78', (goal) 82' (pen.)	Stadium: Nippert Stadium; Attendance: 23,548; Referee: Guido Gonzalez Jr.

August 5 20	New York Red Bulls II	2–1	Rochester Rhinos	Montclair, New Jersey
4:00 PM EDT (UTC-04:00)	Basuljevic 5'; Bonomo 55'	Report	Fall 70' (pen.)	Stadium: MSU Soccer Park; Attendance: 582; Referee: Charles Murphy

August 8 21	Harrisburg City Islanders	0–1	Rochester Rhinos	Harrisburg, Pennsylvania
7:30 PM EDT (UTC-04:00)	Grosh (yellow card) 20'; Brent (yellow card) 59'; Mensah (yellow card) 83'	Report	Madison 25'; Garzi (yellow card) 44'	Stadium: FNB Field; Attendance: 2,078; Referee: Amber O'Connor

August 19 22	Rochester Rhinos	0–1	Charleston Battery	Rochester, New York
18:05 PM EDT (UTC-04:00)	Madison (yellow card) 45+1'	Report	Hackshaw (yellow card) 21'; Williams (yellow card) 25'; Portillo 83'; Cooper (yellow card) 90+2'	Stadium: Capelli Sport Stadium; Attendance: 2,319; Referee: Bardhyl Pashaj

August 26 23	Rochester Rhinos	1–2	Saint Louis FC	Rochester, New York
6:05 PM EDT (UTC-04:00)	Fall 7' (pen.); Graf 55'	Report	Howe 3', (yellow card) 74'; Rudolph (red card) 6'; Alihodžić (yellow card) 26'; Ledbetter (yellow card) 90+1'	Stadium: Capelli Sport Stadium; Attendance: 1,607; Referee: Lucasz Szpala

September 2 24	Toronto FC II	0–1	Rochester Rhinos	Vaughan, Ontario
7:30 PM EDT (UTC-04:00)		Report	Brown 10'; Fall (yellow card) 90+2'	Stadium: Ontario Soccer Centre; Attendance: 143; Referee: Alexis Vaughan

September 9 25	Rochester Rhinos	1–1	Ottawa Fury	Rochester, New York
6:00 PM EDT (UTC-04:00)	François 19'	Report	McEleney (yellow card) 37'; Bruna (yellow card) 63' (yellow-red card) 88'; Dos Santos 71' (pen.)	Stadium: Capelli Sport Stadium; Attendance: 2,345; Referee: Calin Radosav

September 16 26	Pittsburgh Riverhounds	1–1	Rochester Rhinos	Pittsburgh, Pennsylvania
7:00 PM EDT (UTC-04:00)	Kerr 71'	Report	Tergou (yellow card) 73'; Farrell 90'	Stadium: Highmark Stadium; Attendance: 2,341; Referee: Greg Dopka

September 20 27	Louisville City FC	2–1	Rochester Rhinos	Louisville, Kentucky
7:30 PM EDT (UTC-04:00)	Davis IV 23'; Spencer 90+5' (pen.)	Report	Graf 43', (yellow card) 73'; Lee (yellow card) 45'; James (yellow card) 61'; Gomez (yellow card) 88'; Felix (yellow card) 90+4'	Stadium: Louisville Slugger Field; Attendance: 6,698; Referee: Jon Freemon

September 23 28	Richmond Kickers	1–0	Rochester Rhinos	Richmond, Virginia
7:00 PM EDT (UTC-04:00)	Minutillo 80'	Report	Kamdem (yellow card) 79'	Stadium: City Stadium; Attendance: 5,969; Referee: Jorge Ramirez

September 30 29	Rochester Rhinos	0–0	Louisville City FC	Rochester, New York
6:05 PM EDT (UTC-04:00)	Forbes (yellow card) 71'; Felix (yellow card) 85'	Report	Ownby (yellow card) 67'; Morad (yellow card) 90+3'	Stadium: Capelli Sport Stadium; Attendance: 1,775; Referee: Eric Tattersall

October 7 30	Pittsburgh Riverhounds	0–2	Rochester Rhinos	Pittsburgh, Pennsylvania
7:00 PM EDT (UTC-04:00)	Chevy (yellow card) 57'	Report	Graf 1'; Fall 14', (yellow card) 70'	Stadium: Highmark Stadium; Attendance: 2,400; Referee: Elvis Osmanovic

October 10 31	Rochester Rhinos	1–0	Bethlehem Steel FC	Rochester, New York
7:05 PM EDT (UTC-04:00)	Graf 38'	Report	Conneh (yellow card) 86'	Stadium: Capelli Sport Stadium; Attendance: 963; Referee: Thomas Snyder

October 14 32	Rochester Rhinos	2–1	New York Red Bulls II	Rochester, New York
6:05 PM EDT (UTC-04:00)	Graf 35'; Forbes 68'	Report	Valot 37'	Stadium: Capelli Sport Stadium; Attendance: 1,402; Referee: Ismir Pekmic

==== Playoffs ====
October 21 Conference Quarterfinals	Rochester Rhinos	2–1 (a.e.t.)	Charlotte Independence	Rochester, New York
6:05 PM EDT (UTC-04:00)	Dover (yellow card) 11'; Graf 53'; François (yellow card) 61'; Farrell (yellow card) 83'; Defregger 113'	Report	A. Martínez (yellow card) 53', (yellow card) (red card) 120'; E. Martínez 69'; Davidson (yellow card) 85'	Stadium: Capelli Sport Stadium; Attendance: 1,647; Referee: Bardhyl Pashaj

October 28 Conference Semi-finals	Louisville City FC	1–0	Rochester Rhinos	Louisville, Kentucky
7:30 PM EDT (UTC-04:00)	Jimenez (yellow card) 52'; Ownby 77'; Ranjitsingh (yellow card) 90+1'	Report	Felix (yellow card) 55'	Stadium: Louisville Slugger Field; Attendance: 7,117; Referee: Victor Rivas
