= 2019 Pittsburgh Riverhounds SC season =

Pittsburgh Riverhounds SC
2019 season
- Owner: Tuffy Shallenberger
- Head coach: Bob Lilley
- USL Championship: Conference: 1st (current)
- USLC Playoffs: Conference Semifinals
- U.S. Open Cup: Fourth round (knocked out by Columbus Crew SC)
- Top goalscorer: League: Neco Brett (12); All: Neco Brett (14)
- Highest home attendance: 5,182 (April 13 vs. Hartford)
- Lowest home attendance: 444 (May 29 vs. Indy, USOC)
- Average home league attendance: 3,397
- Biggest win: 7–0 (October 26 vs. Birmingham)
- Biggest defeat: 0–5 (August 17 at North Carolina)
Home colors	Away colors	Third colors

The 2019 Pittsburgh Riverhounds SC season was the club's twentieth season of existence, their second consecutive season in the second tier of American soccer, and their ninth season in the league now named the USL Championship. The season covers the period from October 21, 2018 to the beginning of the 2020 USL Championship season. Bob Lilley returns for his second season as Riverhounds manager.

== Roster ==
As of match played October 1, 2019

No.	Name	Nationality	Position(s)	Date of birth (age)	Signed in	Previous club	Apps	Goals
Goalkeepers
1	Kyle Morton	(United States)	GK	March 31, 1994 (age 32)	2018	(United States) Rochester Rhinos	26	0
22	Ben Lundgaard	(United States)	GK	September 2, 1995 (age 31)	2019	(United States) Columbus Crew SC (loan)	4	0
23	Austin Pack	(United States)	GK	February 15, 1994 (age 32)	2019	(United States) Portland Timbers 2	7	0
Defenders
2	Tobi Adewole	(United States)	DF	October 14, 1995 (age 30)	2017	(United States) George Washington Colonials	74	3
3	Uchenna Uzo	(Nigeria)	DF	December 27, 1992 (age 33)	2019	(United States) Phoenix Rising	9	0
4	Dani Rovira	(Colombia)	DF	December 15, 1996 (age 29)	2019	(United States) Vermont Catamounts	9	0
5	Jordan Dover	(Guyana)	DF	December 14, 1994 (age 31)	2018	(United States) Rochester Rhinos	55	3
7	Ryan James	(Canada)	DF	April 21, 1994 (age 32)	2019	(United States) Nashville SC	33	0
13	Caleb Smith	(United States)	DF	October 15, 1996 (age 29)	2019	(United States) SMU Mustangs	1	0
19	Prosper Figbe	(Nigeria)	DF	October 30, 1996 (age 29)	2019	(United States) Virginia Cavaliers	0	0
20	Joseph Greenspan	(United States)	DF	September 12, 1992 (age 34)	2018	(United States) Minnesota United FC	65	7
26	Todd Pratzner	(United States)	DF	August 10, 1994 (age 32)	2019	(United States) Memphis 901	21	0
Midfielders
6	Sammy Kahsai	(Ethiopia)	MF	March 5, 1995 (age 31)	2019	(United States) UMBC Retrievers	16	1
10	Kevin Kerr	(Scotland)	MF	January 12, 1989 (age 37)	2013	(Germany) SC Wiedenbrück	191	32
11	Kenardo Forbes	(Jamaica)	MF	May 15, 1988 (age 38)	2018	(United States) Rochester Rhinos	68	9
14	Noah Franke	(United States)	MF	March 25, 1995 (age 31)	2018	(United States) Creighton Bluejays	29	0
15	Anthony Velarde	(United States)	MF	March 8, 1996 (age 30)	2019	(United States) Fresno Pacific Sunbirds	27	4
17	Thomas Vancaeyezeele	(French Guiana)	MF	July 27, 1994 (age 32)	2018	(United States) Charleston Golden Eagles	67	5
21	Mouhamed Dabo	(Senegal)	MF	January 2, 1996 (age 30)	2018	(United States) Harrisburg City Islanders	45	1
24	Robbie Mertz	(United States)	MF	December 4, 1996 (age 29)	2019	(United States) Michigan Wolverines	27	6
Forwards
8	Steevan Dos Santos	(Cape Verde)	FW	September 17, 1989 (age 36)	2019	(Canada) Ottawa Fury FC	33	9
9	Neco Brett	(Jamaica)	FW	March 22, 1992 (age 34)	2018	(United States) Portland Timbers 2	66	29
12	Christian Volesky	(United States)	FW	September 15, 1992 (age 33)	2019	(United States) OKC Energy	25	3
16	Mark Forrest	(England)	FW	December 3, 1996 (age 29)	2019	(United States) Lehigh Mountain Hawks	5	0

== Non-competitive ==
=== Preseason ===
The Riverhounds released their preseason schedule on January 18, 2019. The club played nine games in just over a month, with six coming against collegiate programs, one against a fellow USL Championship club, and two against clubs from USL League One. All nine games were played in Pittsburgh, with eight taking place at Highmark Stadium.

February 8 Friendly	Pittsburgh Riverhounds SC	1–0	Cleveland State Vikings	Pittsburgh, PA
7:00 PM EST	Forrest 84'	Report		Stadium: Highmark Stadium

February 10 Friendly	Pittsburgh Riverhounds SC	6–0	Gannon Golden Knights	Pittsburgh, PA
1:00 PM EST	Dos Santos 43'; Kerr 45+'; Volesky 49'; Brett 51', 53'; Enowbi 68'	Report		Stadium: Highmark Stadium

February 15 Friendly	Pittsburgh Riverhounds SC	0–0	Duquesne Dukes	Pittsburgh, PA
7:00 PM EST	Adewole (yellow card) 88'	Report		Stadium: Highmark Stadium

February 17 Friendly	Pittsburgh Riverhounds SC	0–0	Charleston Golden Eagles	Pittsburgh, PA
2:00 PM EST		Report		Stadium: Highmark Stadium

February 22 Friendly	Pittsburgh Panthers	1–1	Pittsburgh Riverhounds SC	Pittsburgh, PA
7:00 PM EST	19'	Report	Dos Santos 45+'	Stadium: Ambrose Urbanic Field

February 24 Friendly	Pittsburgh Riverhounds SC	1–0	Bethlehem Steel FC	Pittsburgh, PA
2:00 PM EST	Volesky 44'	Report	(yellow card) 60'; (yellow card) 76'	Stadium: Highmark Stadium

March 1 Friendly	Pittsburgh Riverhounds SC	1–0	Akron Zips	Pittsburgh, PA
3:00 PM EST	Bartman 45'	Report		Stadium: Highmark Stadium

March 3 Friendly	Pittsburgh Riverhounds SC	2–0	Lansing Ignite	Pittsburgh, PA
12:00 PM EST	Dos Santos 22'; Bartman 66'	Report		Stadium: Highmark Stadium

March 9 Friendly	Pittsburgh Riverhounds SC	1–3	Toronto FC II	Pittsburgh, PA
2:00 PM EST	Greenspan (yellow card) 29'; Dos Santos 49'	Report	Shaffelburg 35'; Perruzza 42', 60'; (yellow card) 74'	Stadium: Highmark Stadium

== Competitive ==
=== USL Championship ===
==== Standings ====
Pos	Team	Pld	W	D	L	GF	GA	GD	Pts	Qualification
1	Pittsburgh Riverhounds SC	34	19	11	4	58	30	+28	68	Conference Quarterfinals
2	Nashville SC	34	20	7	7	59	26	+33	67	Conference Quarterfinals
3	Indy Eleven	34	19	6	9	48	29	+19	63	Conference Quarterfinals
4	Louisville City FC	34	17	9	8	58	41	+17	60	Conference Quarterfinals
5	Tampa Bay Rowdies	34	16	10	8	61	33	+28	58	Conference Quarterfinals

Source: USL Championship Standings
Rules for classification: 1) total wins; 2) total goal differential; 3) total goals scored; 4) points earned against top four Conference finishers; 5) disciplinary points; 6) coin toss or drawing of lots

==== Results by round ====
Round	1	2	3	4	5	6	7	8	10	11	12	13	14	15	16	17	18	19	20	21	22	23	24	25	26	27	28	29	9	30	31	32	33	34
Stadium	A	A	A	A	H	H	H	A	H	A	H	A	H	H	H	A	H	H	A	H	H	A	A	H	A	H	H	A	A	H	A	H	A	A
Result	L	D	D	W	W	D	D	D	D	L	D	W	W	W	W	L	D	W	W	W	W	W	L	W	W	D	W	D	W	W	W	D		

Source: Pittsburgh schedule
A = Away; H = Home; W = Win; D = Draw; L = Loss

==== Match results ====
On December 14, 2018, the league announced the home openers for every club. Pittsburgh's home opener at Highmark Stadium will be played on April 13, as the six-year anniversary of the stadium's opening will be marked with a game against expansion club Hartford Athletic. The Riverhounds will also take part in the home opening matches for two other clubs, facing Tampa Bay Rowdies on March 16 and Swope Park Rangers on March 23.

The full Riverhounds schedule was released on December 19, 2018. The season will once again consist of 34 matches, with home and away matches against each Eastern Conference opponent. The Riverhounds will face league newcomers Birmingham Legion FC, Hartford Athletic, Loudoun United FC, and Memphis 901 FC for the first time ever, and will renew their series with Saint Louis FC and Swope Park Rangers as those two clubs move back over from the Western Conference.

March 16 1	Tampa Bay Rowdies	2–0	Pittsburgh Riverhounds SC	St. Petersburg, FL
7:30 PM EDT	Barry 26'; Steinberger 86'	Report		Stadium: Al Lang Stadium; Attendance: 7,234; Referee: Elvis Osmanovic

March 23 2	Swope Park Rangers	2–2	Pittsburgh Riverhounds SC	Kansas City, KS
5:00 PM EDT	Colombie (yellow card) 70'; Wallace 83'; Rowe 88', (yellow card) 90+3'; Abualnadi (red card) 90'	Report	Dabo (yellow card) 33'; Adewole 71'; Velarde 90+1' (pen.)	Stadium: Children's Mercy Park; Attendance: 432; Referee: Guido Gonzales, Jr.

March 30 3	Bethlehem Steel FC	2–2	Pittsburgh Riverhounds SC	Chester, PA
7:00 PM EDT	Faris 21', (yellow card) 44'; Willis (yellow card) 29'; Ngalina 36'; Chambers (yellow card) 70'	Report	Kerr 4'; Greenspan 60'; Dover (yellow card) 72'	Stadium: Talen Energy Stadium; Attendance: 480; Referee: Jose Lara

April 6 4	Louisville City	0–1	Pittsburgh Riverhounds SC	Louisville, KY
7:00 PM EDT	Mkosana (yellow card) 78'; Rasmussen (yellow card) 89'	Report	Greenspan (yellow card) 29'; Brett 74' (pen.); James (yellow card) 75'	Stadium: Louisville Slugger Field; Attendance: 8,544; Referee: Greg Dopka

April 13 5	Pittsburgh Riverhounds SC	3–1	Hartford Athletic	Pittsburgh, PA
7:00 PM EDT	Dos Santos 14'; Kerr 74'; Brett 81' (pen.)	Report	Curinga (yellow card) 45'; David (yellow card) 50'; Angulo 54'; Lyngø (yellow card) 64'	Stadium: Highmark Stadium; Attendance: 5,182; Referee: Austin Saini

April 20 6	Pittsburgh Riverhounds SC	0–0	Saint Louis FC	Pittsburgh, PA
7:00 PM EDT	Greenspan (yellow card) 29'; Dos Santos (yellow card) 40'; Dover (yellow card) 58'; Vancaeyezeele (yellow card) 90+2'	Report		Stadium: Highmark Stadium; Attendance: 2,150; Referee: Eric Tattersall

April 27 7	Pittsburgh Riverhounds SC	2–2	Nashville SC	Pittsburgh, PA
7:00 PM EDT	Volesky 88'; Kimura 90+1' (o.g.); Velarde (yellow card) 90+4'	Report	Bourgeois (yellow card) 22', (goal) 66'; Tribbett 41'; Ríos (yellow card) 74'	Stadium: Highmark Stadium; Attendance: 2,826; Referee: Charles Murphy

May 4 8	Charleston Battery	2–2	Pittsburgh Riverhounds SC	Charleston, SC
7:30 PM EDT	Anunga (yellow card) 14'; Woodbine (yellow card) 44'; van Schaik (yellow card) 45'; Piggott (yellow card) 45+1'; Lewis 76' (pen.); Bosua (yellow card) 79'; Daley 81'	Report	Kerr 5'; Forbes 12'; Greenspan (yellow card) 37'	Stadium: MUSC Health Stadium; Attendance: 1,661; Referee: Gustavo Solorio

May 18 9	Memphis 901	Postponed	Pittsburgh Riverhounds SC	Memphis, TN
8:00 PM EDT		Report		Stadium: AutoZone Park; Referee: Kevin Broadley
Note: The game was abandoned at halftime due to inclement weather. Pittsburgh was leading, 1–0, on a goal in the 26th minute from Christian Volesky. The match was replayed in full on the rescheduled date.

May 25 10	Pittsburgh Riverhounds SC	0–0	Charlotte Independence	Pittsburgh, PA
7:00 PM EDT	Greenspan (yellow card) 28' (yellow-red card) 36'	Report	Johnson (yellow card) 47'; Jackson (yellow card) 90+1'	Stadium: Highmark Stadium; Attendance: 2,522; Referee: Alejandro Mariscal

June 1 11	Indy Eleven	2–1	Pittsburgh Riverhounds SC	Indianapolis, IN
7:00 PM EDT	Kim (yellow card) 60'; Walker 71'; Pasher 81'	Report	Mertz 15'; Forrest (red card) 90+1'	Stadium: Lucas Oil Stadium; Attendance: 10,071; Referee: Lorant Varga

June 8 12	Pittsburgh Riverhounds SC	2–2	Ottawa Fury FC	Pittsburgh, PA
7:00 PM EDT	Kerr 34'; Vancaeyezeele (yellow card) 41'; Dos Santos (yellow card) 58'; Brett 62', (yellow card) 73'	Report	Obasi (yellow card) 45'; Ward (yellow card) 61'; Fall 66' (pen.); Daniels 69'	Stadium: Highmark Stadium; Attendance: 3,019; Referee: Kevin Broadley

June 15 13	Atlanta United 2	0–5	Pittsburgh Riverhounds SC	Kennesaw, GA
7:30 PM EDT	Barajas (yellow card) 15'; Ambrose (yellow card) 78'	Report	Mertz 4'; Dos Santos 7'; Brett 13'; Vancaeyezeele 70'; Wyke 76' (o.g.)	Stadium: Fifth Third Bank Stadium; Attendance: 2,305; Referee: Daniel Gutierrez

June 22 14	Pittsburgh Riverhounds SC	3–0	New York Red Bulls II	Pittsburgh, PA
7:00 PM EDT	Brett 40'; Dos Santos 51'; Vancaeyezeele 58'	Report	Koffi (yellow card) 63' (yellow-red card) 65'; Zajec (yellow card) 90'	Stadium: Highmark Stadium; Attendance: 2,900; Referee: Lukasz Szpala

June 29 15	Pittsburgh Riverhounds SC	4–1	Birmingham Legion	Pittsburgh, PA
7:00 PM EDT	Dos Santos 13'; Mertz 25', 39'; Volesky 75'	Report	Avila (yellow card) 79'; Hoffman 83'	Stadium: Highmark Stadium; Attendance: 3,866; Referee: Thomas Snyder

July 4 16	Pittsburgh Riverhounds SC	1–0	Bethlehem Steel FC	Pittsburgh, PA
7:00 PM EDT	Rovira (yellow card) 53'; Forbes 57'; Adewole (yellow card) 74'; Greenspan (yellow card) 90'	Report	Real (yellow card) 36'; Willis (yellow card) 49'; Chambers (yellow card) 72'	Stadium: Highmark Stadium; Attendance: 4,074; Referee: Malik Badawi

July 7 17	Charlotte Independence	1–0	Pittsburgh Riverhounds SC	Matthews, NC
7:00 PM EDT	A. Martínez 23'	Report	Adewole (yellow card) 68'; Kerr (yellow card) 90+3'	Stadium: Sportsplex at Matthews; Attendance: 1,217; Referee: Sergii Demianchuk

July 13 18	Pittsburgh Riverhounds SC	1–1	Tampa Bay Rowdies	Pittsburgh, PA
7:00 PM EDT	Kerr 52' (pen.)	Report	Morad (yellow card) 13'; Diakité (yellow card) 51'; Mkosana 84'	Stadium: Highmark Stadium; Attendance: 3,045; Referee: Victor Rivas

July 20 19	Pittsburgh Riverhounds SC	1–0	North Carolina FC	Pittsburgh, PA
7:00 PM EDT	Mertz 27'; Dos Santos (yellow card) 75'	Report		Stadium: Highmark Stadium; Attendance: 3,891; Referee: Ismir Pekmic

July 27 20	Hartford Athletic	2–4	Pittsburgh Riverhounds SC	Hartford, CT
7:00 PM EDT	Jørgenson 47', (yellow card) 90+3'; Dalgaard 84'	Report	Dos Santos 13'; Velarde 37'; Curinga 38' (o.g.); Brett 76'	Stadium: Dillon Stadium; Attendance: 4,606; Referee: Calin Radosav

August 3 21	Pittsburgh Riverhounds SC	4–0	Memphis 901	Pittsburgh, PA
7:00 PM EDT	Adewole 27'; Mertz 45+1'; Dover 64'; Dos Santos 69'; Volesky (yellow card) 90+1'	Report	Paul (yellow card) 51'; Metzger (yellow card) 76'	Stadium: Highmark Stadium; Attendance: 3,273; Referee: Thomas Snyder

August 10 22	Pittsburgh Riverhounds SC	3–2	Swope Park Rangers	Pittsburgh, PA
7:00 PM EDT	Volesky 7'; Velarde (yellow card) 37', (goal) 51'; Mertz (yellow card) 45'; Brett 47'; James (yellow card) 56'; Dover (yellow card) 78'	Report	Riley (yellow card) 19'; Zelalem 33' (pen.); Zé Pedro 67'	Stadium: Highmark Stadium; Attendance: 3,817; Referee: Alejandro Mariscal

August 14 23	New York Red Bulls II	1–2	Pittsburgh Riverhounds SC	Montclair, NJ
7:00 PM EDT	Barlow 20'; Koffi (yellow card) 63'; Elney (yellow card) 90+2'	Report	Greenspan 36'; Mertz (yellow card) 58'; Brett 84'	Stadium: MSU Soccer Park at Pittser Field; Attendance: 783; Referee: Matthew Franz

August 17 24	North Carolina FC	5–0	Pittsburgh Riverhounds SC	Cary, NC
7:00 PM EDT	Comsia (yellow card) 27'; Fortune 45+1' (pen.), 59'; Ewolo 50', 57'; Smith (yellow card) 53'; Kristo 74'	Report	Vancaeyezeele (red card) 44'; Forbes (yellow card) 56'; James (yellow card) 69'	Stadium: WakeMed Soccer Park; Attendance: 3,108; Referee: Jon Freemon

August 23 25	Pittsburgh Riverhounds SC	1–0	Loudoun United	Pittsburgh, PA
7:00 PM EDT	Dos Santos 5'; Dover (yellow card) 77'	Report	Martinez (yellow card) 53'; Amoh (yellow card) 68'	Stadium: Highmark Stadium; Attendance: 4,078; Referee: Chris Ruska

August 30 26	Ottawa Fury FC	0–4	Pittsburgh Riverhounds SC	Ottawa, ON
7:00 PM EDT		Report	Dos Santos 2'; Brett 11', 34'; Dabo (yellow card) 20'; Kahsai (yellow card) 82', (goal) 86'; Greenspan (yellow card) 84'	Stadium: TD Place Stadium; Attendance: 5,502; Referee: David Barrie

September 7 27	Pittsburgh Riverhounds SC	0–0	Louisville City	Pittsburgh, PA
7:00 PM EDT	Dover (yellow card) 33'	Report	Souahy (yellow card) 31'	Stadium: Highmark Stadium; Attendance: 3,526; Referee: Elton García

September 14 28	Pittsburgh Riverhounds SC	1–0	Charleston Battery	Pittsburgh, PA
7:00 PM EDT	Dos Santos (yellow card) 34', (goal) 69'; Mertz (yellow card) 83'	Report	Guerra (yellow card) 33'	Stadium: Highmark Stadium; Attendance: 2,658; Referee: Lorant Varga

September 21 29	Nashville SC	0–0	Pittsburgh Riverhounds SC	Nashville, TN
8:00 PM EDT		Report	Adewole (red card) 40'	Stadium: First Tennessee Park; Attendance: 6,689; Referee: Farhad Dadkho

September 24 9	Memphis 901	0–1	Pittsburgh Riverhounds SC	Memphis, TN
8:00 PM EDT		Report	Greenspan 15'; Mertz (yellow card) 56'; Kerr (yellow card) 90'	Stadium: AutoZone Park; Attendance: 4,142; Referee: Brad Jensen
Note: The game was abandoned at halftime due to inclement weather. Pittsburgh was leading, 1–0, on a goal in the 26th minute from Christian Volesky. The match was replayed in full on the rescheduled date.

September 28 30	Pittsburgh Riverhounds SC	3–0	Indy Eleven	Pittsburgh, PA
7:00 PM EDT	Brett 15'; Forbes 40', 71'	Report	Ayoze (yellow card) 60'; Watson (yellow card) 73'	Stadium: Highmark Stadium; Attendance: 3,520; Referee: Malik Badawi

October 1 31	Loudoun United	1–2	Pittsburgh Riverhounds SC	Leesburg, VA
7:30 PM EDT	Murphy (yellow card) 35', (goal) 52'; Garduño (yellow card) 44'	Report	Mertz (yellow card) 22'; Brett 57'; Greenspan 62'	Stadium: Segra Field; Attendance: 617; Referee: Guido Gonzales Jr.

October 5 32	Pittsburgh Riverhounds SC	1–1	Atlanta United 2	Pittsburgh, PA
7:00 PM EDT	Brett 45' (pen.); Dover (yellow card) 62'; Adewole (yellow card) 74'	Report	Campbell (yellow card) 35'; Wyke (yellow card) 59'; Fernando (yellow card) 72'; Metcalf (yellow card) 76'; Kissiedou (yellow card) 81'; Decas 87'	Stadium: Highmark Stadium; Attendance: 4,553; Referee: Elvis Osmanovic

October 12 33	Saint Louis FC	0–1	Pittsburgh Riverhounds SC	Fenton, MO
8:30 PM EDT	Abend (yellow card) 44'; Kavita (yellow card) 51'; Kamdem (yellow card) 59'	Report	Dos Santos 88', (yellow card) 90+6'	Stadium: Toyota Stadium; Attendance: 5,273; Referee: Jon Freemon

October 20 34	Birmingham Legion	0–1	Pittsburgh Riverhounds SC	Birmingham, AL
4:30 PM EDT	Ugarte (yellow card) 56'	Report	Greenspan (yellow card) 71'; Forrest 90'	Stadium: BBVA Field; Referee: Kevin Broadley

==== USL Cup Playoffs ====
October 26 Conference Quarterfinals	Pittsburgh Riverhounds SC	7–0	Birmingham Legion	Pittsburgh, PA
7:00 PM EDT	Brett 13', 27', 34' (pen.), 71'; Fisher 17' (o.g.); Dover 45+1'; Mertz 62' (pen.); Adewole (yellow card) 77'	Report	Culbertson (yellow card) 31'; Lopez (yellow card) 41'; Herivaux (red card) 61'	Stadium: Highmark Stadium; Referee: Mark Allatin

November 2 Conference Semifinal	Pittsburgh Riverhounds SC	1–2 (a.e.t.)	Louisville City FC	Pittsburgh, PA
7:00 p.m. EDT	Vancaeyezeele 11'; Greenspan (yellow card) 48'	Report	Spencer 51', (yellow card) 85'; McMahon (yellow card) 54'; Craig (yellow card) 70'; DelPiccolo 118'	Stadium: Highmark Stadium; Attendance: 6,073; Referee: Michael Radchuk

=== U.S. Open Cup ===
As a member of the USL Championship, the Riverhounds entered the tournament in the second round, to be played May 14, 2019.

May 14 Second round	Pittsburgh Riverhounds SC (Pennsylvania)	3–0	(Ohio) Dayton Dutch Lions	Pittsburgh, PA
7:00 PM EDT	Brett 57' (pen.), 69'; Velarde 90+1'	Report		Stadium: Highmark Stadium; Attendance: 523; Referee: Austin Saini

May 29 Third round	Pittsburgh Riverhounds SC (Pennsylvania)	1–0	(Indiana) Indy Eleven	Pittsburgh, PA
7:00 PM EDT	James (yellow card) 43'; Greenspan (yellow card) 74'; Forbes 85'	Report		Stadium: Highmark Stadium; Attendance: 444; Referee: Chris Ruska

June 11 Fourth round	Columbus Crew SC (Ohio)	1–0	(Pennsylvania) Pittsburgh Riverhounds SC	Columbus, OH
7:00 PM EDT	Accam 55'	Report		Stadium: Mapfre Stadium; Attendance: 5,202; Referee: Matthew Franz

== Statistics ==
=== Appearances and goals ===
No.	Pos	Nat	Player	Total		USLC		U.S. Open Cup	
No.	Pos	Nat	Player	Apps	Goals	Apps	Goals	Apps	Goals
1	GK	(United States) USA	Kyle Morton	23	0	21	0	2	0
2	DF	(United States) USA	Tobi Adewole	33	2	29+1	2	3	0
3	DF	(Nigeria) NGA	Uchenna Uzo	9	0	2+4	0	3	0
4	DF	(Colombia) COL	Dani Rovira	9	0	4+2	0	3	0
5	DF	(Guyana) GUY	Jordan Dover	23	1	22	1	0+1	0
6	MF	(Ethiopia) ETH	Sammy Kahsai	16	1	7+6	1	3	0
7	DF	(Canada) CAN	Ryan James	33	0	28+3	0	2	0
8	FW	(Cape Verde) CPV	Steevan Dos Santos	33	9	25+5	9	1+2	0
9	FW	(Jamaica) JAM	Neco Brett	30	14	24+4	12	2	2
10	MF	(Scotland) SCO	Kevin Kerr	27	5	24+3	5	0	0
11	MF	(Jamaica) JAM	Kenardo Forbes	34	5	28+3	4	1+2	1
12	FW	(United States) USA	Christian Volesky	25	3	9+15	3	1	0
13	DF	(United States) USA	Caleb Smith	1	0	0+1	0	0	0
14	MF	(United States) USA	Noah Franke	19	0	8+8	0	3	0
15	MF	(United States) USA	Anthony Velarde	27	4	11+13	3	3	1
16	FW	(England) ENG	Mark Forrest	5	0	1+3	0	1	0
17	MF	(French Guiana) GUF	Thomas Vancaeyezeele	32	2	28+1	2	2+1	0
19	DF	(Nigeria) NGA	Prosper Figbe	0	0	0	0	0	0
20	DF	(United States) USA	Joseph Greenspan	31	4	28+1	4	2	0
21	MF	(Senegal) SEN	Mouhamed Dabo	20	0	12+8	0	0	0
22	GK	(United States) USA	Ben Lundgaard	4	0	4	0	0	0
23	GK	(United States) USA	Austin Pack	7	0	6	0	1	0
24	MF	(United States) USA	Robbie Mertz	27	6	18+6	6	1+2	0
26	DF	(United States) USA	Todd Pratzner	3	0	2+1	0	0	0
Players who left Pittsburgh during the season:
33	MF	(United States) USA	Ethan Kutler	0	0	0	0	0	0

Source: Pittsburgh stats

=== Disciplinary record ===
No.	Pos.	Name	USLC		U.S. Open Cup		Total	
No.	Pos.	Name	Booked	Sent off (straight red)	Booked	Sent off (straight red)	Booked	Sent off (straight red)
2	DF	(United States) Tobi Adewole	2	1	0	0	2	1
4	DF	(Colombia) Dani Rovira	1	0	0	0	1	0
5	DF	(Guyana) Jordan Dover	5	0	0	0	5	0
6	MF	(Ethiopia) Sammy Kahsai	1	0	0	0	1	0
7	DF	(Canada) Ryan James	3	0	1	0	4	0
8	FW	(Cape Verde) Steevan Dos Santos	4	0	0	0	4	0
9	FW	(Jamaica) Neco Brett	1	0	0	0	1	0
10	MF	(Scotland) Kevin Kerr	2	0	0	0	2	0
11	MF	(Jamaica) Kenardo Forbes	1	0	0	0	1	0
12	FW	(United States) Christian Volesky	1	0	0	0	1	0
15	MF	(United States) Anthony Velarde	2	0	0	0	2	0
16	FW	(England) Mark Forrest	0	1	0	0	0	1
17	MF	(French Guiana) Thomas Vancaeyezeele	2	1	0	0	2	1
20	DF	(United States) Joseph Greenspan	5	1	1	0	6	1
21	MF	(Senegal) Mouhamed Dabo	2	0	0	0	2	0
24	MF	(United States) Robbie Mertz	5	0	0	0	5	0

Source: Pittsburgh stats

=== Clean sheets ===
No.	Name	USLC	U.S. Open Cup	Total	Games Played		
No.	Name	1	(United States) Kyle Morton	11	1	12	23
22	(United States) Ben Lundgaard	2	0	2	4		
23	(United States) Austin Pack	2	1	3	7		

Source: Pittsburgh stats

== Transfers ==
=== In ===
Pos.	Player	Transferred from	Fee/notes	Date	Source
DF	(Canada) Ryan James	(United States) Nashville SC	One-year contract with a club option for 2020.	Nov 28, 2018	
FW	(Cape Verde) Steevan Dos Santos	(Canada) Ottawa Fury FC	One-year contract with a club option for 2020.	Jan 8, 2019	
MF	(United States) Anthony Velarde	(United States) Fresno Pacific Sunbirds	One-year contract with a club option for 2020.	Jan 14, 2019	
FW	(United States) Christian Volesky	(United States) OKC Energy	One-year contract with a club option for 2020.	Feb 7, 2019	
DF	(United States) Caleb Smith	(United States) SMU Mustangs	One-year contract with a club option for 2020.	Feb 22, 2019	
MF	(Ethiopia) Sammy Kahsai	(United States) UMBC Retrievers	One-year contract with a club option for 2020.	Mar 4, 2019	
MF	(United States) Ethan Kutler	(United States) New York Red Bulls	One-year contract with a club option for 2020.	Mar 8, 2019	
DF	(United States) Dani Rovira	(United States) Vermont Catamounts	One-year contract with a club option for 2020.	Mar 8, 2019	
DF	(Nigeria) Uchenna Uzo	(United States) Phoenix Rising	One-year contract with a club option for 2020.	Mar 8, 2019	
DF	(Nigeria) Prosper Figbe	(United States) Virginia Cavaliers	One-year contract with a club option for 2020.	Mar 29, 2019	
FW	(England) Mark Forrest	(United States) Lehigh Mountain Hawks	One-year contract with a club option for 2020.	Mar 29, 2019	
MF	(United States) Robbie Mertz	(United States) Michigan Wolverines	One-year contract with a club option for 2020.	Mar 29, 2019	
GK	(United States) Austin Pack	(United States) Portland Timbers 2	One-year contract with a club option for 2020.	May 2, 2019	
DF	(United States) Todd Pratzner	(United States) Memphis 901	Remainder of the 2019 USL Championship season.	Sep 18, 2019	

=== Loan in ===
Pos.	Player	Parent club	Length/Notes	Beginning	End	Source
GK	(United States) Ben Lundgaard	(United States) Columbus Crew SC	Duration of the 2019 USL Championship season.	Mar 6, 2019	Jun 21, 2019	
GK	(United States) Ben Lundgaard	(United States) Columbus Crew SC	Duration of the 2019 USL Championship season.	Oct 7, 2019	Nov 3, 2019	

=== Out ===
Pos.	Player	Transferred to	Fee/notes	Date	Source
FW	(United States) Kay Banjo		Contract expired.	Nov 13, 2018	
FW	(Jamaica) Dennis Chin	(United States) Richmond Kickers	Contract option declined. Signed for Richmond on Jan 7, 2019.	Nov 13, 2018	
MF	(United States) Ben Fitzpatrick	(United States) Cleveland SC	Contract expired. Signed for Cleveland on May 14, 2019.	Nov 13, 2018	
MF	(United States) Bakie Goodman	(United States) Detroit City	Contract option declined. Signed for Detroit on Feb 4, 2019.	Nov 13, 2018	
MF	(England) Joe Holland	(United States) Birmingham Legion	Contract option declined. Signed for Birmingham on Nov 20, 2018.	Nov 13, 2018	
GK	(United States) Nathan Ingham	(Canada) York 9	Contract option declined. Signed for York on Apr 8, 2019.	Nov 13, 2018	
GK	(United States) Mike Kirk	(United States) Lansing Ignite	Contract option declined. Signed for Lansing for the 2019 USL League One season.	Nov 13, 2018	
DF	(United States) Raymond Lee	(United States) Hartford Athletic	Contract option declined. Signed for Hartford on Jan 17, 2019.	Nov 13, 2018	
DF	(United States) Andrew Lubahn	(United States) Loudoun United	Contract option declined. Signed for Loudoun on Feb 16, 2019.	Nov 13, 2018	
GK	(United States) Daniel Lynd		Contract option declined.	Nov 13, 2018	
FW	(Jamaica) Romeo Parkes	(Republic of Ireland) Sligo Rovers	Contract expired. Signed for Sligo on Jan 15, 2019.	Nov 13, 2018	
DF	(United States) Todd Pratzner	(United States) Memphis 901	Contract option declined. Signed for Memphis on Dec 13, 2018.	Nov 13, 2018	
DF	(United States) Hugh Roberts	(United States) Charlotte Independence	Contract option declined. Signed for Charlotte on Jan 10, 2019.	Nov 13, 2018	
MF	(United States) Ben Zemanski		Contract option declined. Retired.	Nov 13, 2018	
MF	(Haiti) Christiano François	(Canada) Ottawa Fury FC	Pittsburgh receives an undisclosed transfer fee.	Dec 3, 2018	
MF	(United States) Ethan Kutler		No longer listed on roster.	May 1, 2019	

== Awards ==
USLC Team of the Week
Week	Starters	Bench	Opponent(s)	Link
3		(Jamaica) Kenardo Forbes	Swope Park Rangers	
5		(United States) Joseph Greenspan	Louisville City	
6	(Scotland) Kevin Kerr		Hartford Athletic	
8	(Canada) Ryan James		Nashville SC	
9	(Jamaica) Kenardo Forbes		Charleston Battery	
15	(Cape Verde) Steevan Dos Santos	(Jamaica) Kenardo Forbes	Atlanta United 2	
16	(Jamaica) Kenardo Forbes	(Cape Verde) Steevan Dos Santos	New York Red Bulls II	
17	(United States) Robbie Mertz	(Scotland) Kevin Kerr	Birmingham Legion	
18	(Jamaica) Kenardo Forbes		Bethlehem Steel FC; Charlotte Independence	
21		(United States) Anthony Velarde	Hartford Athletic	
22	(Jamaica) Kenardo Forbes		Memphis 901	
23	(United States) Robbie Mertz		Swope Park Rangers	
24		(United States) Joseph Greenspan	New York Red Bulls II; North Carolina FC	
25		(United States) Kyle Morton	Loudoun United	
26	(Jamaica) Neco Brett	(Cape Verde) Steevan Dos Santos	Ottawa Fury FC	
28	(Jamaica) Kenardo Forbes		Charleston Battery	
29		(United States) Kyle Morton	Nashville SC	
30	(Jamaica) Kenardo Forbes (United States) Kyle Morton	(Jamaica) Neco Brett	Memphis 901; Indy Eleven	

USLC Player of the Week
Week	Player	Opponent	Link
15	(Cape Verde) Steevan Dos Santos	Atlanta United 2	
26	(Jamaica) Neco Brett	Ottawa Fury FC	
30	(Jamaica) Kenardo Forbes	Memphis 901; Indy Eleven	

== Kits ==
Home	Away	Third

Type	Shirt	Shorts	Socks	First appearance / Record
Home	Gold	Black	Gold	Match 2 vs. Swope Park / 5–6–2
Away	Black/Gray	Gray	Gray	Match 1 vs. Tampa Bay / 2–1–2
Third	White	White	White	Match 5 vs. Hartford / 12–3–1

== See also ==
- Pittsburgh Riverhounds SC
- 2019 in American soccer
- 2019 USL Championship season
