= 2016 Rochester Rhinos season =

Rochester Rhinos
2016 season
- Owners: David and Wendy Dworkin
- Head coach: Bob Lilley
- Stadium: Rochester Rhinos Stadium
- USL: Conference: 4th, Eastern Conference
- USL Playoffs: Conference semi-finals
- U.S. Open Cup: Fourth Round
Home colors	Away colors	Third colors

The 2016 Rochester Rhinos season was the club's 21st year of existence, and their sixth season in the third tier of the United States soccer pyramid, playing in the United Soccer League Eastern Conference. They entered the season as defending USL champions and made it back to the playoffs, but were eliminated in the conference semi-finals by the New York Red Bulls II.

== Roster ==
as of March 24, 2015

No.	Position	Nation	Player
1	GK	USA	Adam Grinwis
2	MF	USA	Marcos Ugarte
3	DF	FRA	Bradley Kamdem
4	DF	USA	Sean Totsch
5	DF	GRE	Vassilios Apostolopoulos
6	MF	GUI	Michel Guilavogui
7	MF	CAN	Ryan James
8	MF	TRI	Andre Fortune II
9	FW	USA	Christian Volesky
10	FW	CPV	Duba
11	MF	JAM	Kenardo Forbes
12	FW	JAM	Asani Samuels
13	MF	USA	Mike Garzi
15	DF	USA	Joe Farrell
16	MF	USA	Sean Reilly
17	DF	GER	Wal Fall
18	GK	USA	Tomas Gomez
20	DF	USA	Tony Walls
21	DF	CAN	Dominic Samuel
22	MF	GUY	Brandon Beresford
23	MF	USA	Jordan Becker
29	MF	FRA	Sofiane Tergou
33	GK	USA	Daniel Lynd

== Competitions ==
=== Preseason ===
March 4, 2016 Preseason	Buffalo Bulls	1–1	Rochester Rhinos	Amherst, New York
				Stadium: University at Buffalo Stadium

March 6, 2016 Preseason	Rochester Rhinos	2–0	Colgate Raiders	Victor, New York
				Stadium: Pinnacle Athletic Facility

March 10, 2016 Preseason	Rochester Rhinos	3–3	Ottawa Fury FC	Victor, New York
	Volesky (2nd quarter); Duba (3rd quarter), (3rd quarter)		Paulo Jr. (2nd quarter); Gyorio (4th quarter); Bruna (4th quarter)	Stadium: Pinnacle Athletic Facility
Note: Was played with four 30-minute quarters

March 26, 2016 Preseason	Rochester Rhinos	1–0	Syracuse Orange	Victor, New York
				Stadium: Pinnacle Athletic Facility

=== USL Regular season ===
==== Standings ====
Pos	Team	Pld	W	D	L	GF	GA	GD	Pts	Qualification
2	Louisville City FC	30	17	9	4	52	27	+25	60	Conference Playoffs
3	FC Cincinnati	30	16	8	6	41	27	+14	56	Conference Playoffs
4	Rochester Rhinos	30	13	12	5	38	25	+13	51	Conference Playoffs
5	Charlotte Independence	30	14	8	8	48	29	+19	50	Conference Playoffs
6	Charleston Battery	30	13	9	8	38	33	+5	48	Conference Playoffs

Source: 2016 USL Standings
Rules for classification: 1) total wins; 2) total goal differential; 3) total goals scored; 4) points earned against top four Conference finishers; 5) disciplinary points; 6) coin toss or drawing of lots

==== Matches ====
All times in regular season on Eastern Daylight Time (UTC-04:00)

Win Draw Loss Upcoming fixture

April 2, 2016 1	Pittsburgh Riverhounds	0–1	Rochester Rhinos	Pittsburgh, Pennsylvania
7:00pm		Report	Volesky 7'; Apostolopoulos (yellow card) 62'; Ugarte (yellow card) 64'; Totsch (yellow card) 85'	Stadium: Highmark Stadium; Attendance: 1,106; Referee: Leland Grant

April 9, 2016 2	Richmond Kickers	1–0	Rochester Rhinos	Richmond, Virginia
5:00pm	Imura 61'	Report	Garzi (yellow card) 73'	Stadium: City Stadium; Attendance: 4,990; Referee: Matthew Franz

April 17, 2016 3	New York Red Bulls II	0–0	Rochester Rhinos	Harrison, New Jersey
4:00pm	Powder (yellow card) 66'	Report	Ugarte (yellow card) 42'; Farrell (yellow card) 68'; Duba (red card) 93'	Stadium: Red Bull Arena

April 23, 2016 4	Rochester Rhinos	2–1	FC Montreal	Rochester, New York
5:00pm	Volesky 52', 56' (pen.); Forbes (yellow card) 90+4'	Report	Joly 48'; Dominguez (yellow card) 50'; Gagnon-Laparé (yellow card) 56'; Béland-Goyette (yellow card) 66'; Kacher (yellow card) 86'; Charbonneau (yellow card) 90+6'; Fisher (yellow card) 90+7'	Stadium: Rochester Rhinos Stadium

April 30, 2016 5	Rochester Rhinos	2–1	Harrisburg City Islanders	Rochester, New York
6:00pm	Forbes 23'; Kamdem (yellow card) 40'; James 61'; Apostolopoulos (yellow card) 73'; Fortune (yellow card) 85'; Samuel (yellow card) 90+2'	Report	Johnson (yellow card) 36'; Thomas (yellow card) 68' (yellow-red card) 88'; Foster 86'	Stadium: Rochester Rhinos Stadium; Attendance: 2,513

May 6, 2016 6	Rochester Rhinos	3–2	Charleston Battery	Rochester, New York
7:00pm	Farrell 11'; Garzi (yellow card) 22'; Forbes 28'; Volesky (yellow card) 37'; Kamdem (yellow card) 68' (goal) 75' (pen.)	Report	Williams 15'; Chang (yellow card) 21'; Garbonzo 49'; Hackshaw (yellow card) 73'	Stadium: Rochester Rhinos Stadium; Attendance: 4,162

May 14, 2016 7	Rochester Rhinos	0–0	Charlotte Independence	Rochester, New York
6:00pm	Fall (yellow card) 14'; Samuel (yellow card) 62'	Report	Ekra (yellow card) 42'	Stadium: Rochester Rhinos Stadium; Attendance: 2,142

May 22, 2016 8	Orlando City B	2–1	Rochester Rhinos	Melbourne, Florida
7:30pm	Barry 41', 57'; Turner (yellow card) 90'	Report	Garzi (yellow card) 42'; Apostolopoulos (yellow card) 74'; Dos Santos 86' (pen.)	Stadium: Titan Soccer Complex; Attendance: 925

May 28, 2016 9	Rochester Rhinos	2–2	Bethlehem Steel FC	Rochester, New York
6:00pm	Farrell 13', 90+4' (yellow card) 69'; Volesky (yellow card) 27'	Report	Richter 24' (pen.); Chambers (yellow card) 27'; Daly 58'; Carreiro (yellow card) 90'	Stadium: Rochester Rhinos Stadium

June 4, 2016 10	FC Montreal	0–2	Rochester Rhinos	Montreal, Quebec
3:00pm	Mkungilwa (yellow card) 90+4'	Report	Volesky 45'; Duba 49'	Stadium: Complexe sportif Claude-Robillard; Attendance: 248

June 11, 2016 11	Toronto FC II	1–2	Rochester Rhinos	Vaughan, Ontario
7:30pm	Hundal (yellow card) 34'; Osorio (yellow card) 54'; Uccello 77'; Simonin (yellow card) 89'; Johnson 90+1'	Report	Apostolopoulos (yellow card) 68'; Farrell 90+2'	Stadium: Ontario Soccer Centre; Attendance: 1,262; Referee: Carol Anne Chenard

June 18, 2016 12	Rochester Rhinos	0–1	Louisville City FC	Rochester, New York
6:00pm	Kamdem (yellow card) 80'	Report	Lubahn 28'; Del Piccolo (yellow card) 45'	Stadium: Rochester Rhinos Stadium; Referee: Patrick Rosas

June 25, 2016 13	Rochester Rhinos	2–1	Pittsburgh Riverhounds	Rochester, New York
6:00pm	Farrell 8'; Garzi 60'	Report	Hertzog 45'	Stadium: Rochester Rhinos Stadium; Attendance: 3,543

July 2, 2016 14	New York Red Bulls II	0–0	Rochester Rhinos	Harrison, New Jersey
4:00pm	Long (yellow card) 10'; Williams (yellow card) 55'; Allen (yellow card) 71'	Report	Fall (yellow card) 80'	Stadium: Red Bull Arena

July 6, 2016 15	Rochester Rhinos	2–1	FC Cincinnati	Rochester, New York
7:00pm	Garzi 34'; Dos Santos 65' (pen.)	Report	Delbridge (yellow card) 64'; Okoli 75' (pen.)	Stadium: Rochester Rhinos Stadium; Attendance: 3,023; Referee: Edvin Jurisevic

July 10, 2016 16	Rochester Rhinos	0–0	Orlando City B	Rochester, New York
6:00pm	Fall (yellow card) 31'	Report	Mendoza (yellow card) 24'	Stadium: Rochester Rhinos Stadium

July 16, 2016 17	Rochester Rhinos	3–1	FC Montreal	Rochester, New York
7:00pm	Volesky 32'; Duba 49'; Fall (yellow card) 59' (goal) 79'; Samuel (yellow card) 81'	Report	Mkungilwa 12'	Stadium: Rochester Rhinos Stadium; Attendance: 4,560

July 20, 2016 18	Toronto FC II	1–1	Rochester Rhinos	Vaughan, Ontario
7:30pm	Osorio (yellow card) 31'; Thomas 77'	Report	Volesky 27'	Stadium: Ontario Soccer Centre; Attendance: 1,072; Referee: Yusri Rudolph

July 24, 2016 19	Bethlehem Steel FC	1–1	Rochester Rhinos	Bethlehem, Pennsylvania
4:00pm	Jones 20'; Conneh (yellow card) 45+4'; Burke (yellow card) 79'	Report	Forbes 57'	Stadium: Goodman Stadium; Attendance: 1,996; Referee: Matthew Franz

July 29, 2016 20	Harrisburg City Islanders	1–1	Rochester Rhinos	Harrisburg, Pennsylvania
7:00pm	Thomas (yellow card) 9'; Pettis (yellow card) 31'; Leverock (yellow card) 87'; Jankouskas 90+'	Report	Totsch 87'	Stadium: FNB Field; Attendance: 1,923

August 3, 2016 21	Rochester Rhinos	0–1	Richmond Kickers	Rochester, New York
7:00pm	Kamdem (yellow card) 74'	Report	Roberts (yellow card) 54'; Sekyere (yellow card) 60'; Asante (yellow card) 70'; Imura 75'; Ownby (yellow card) 77'	Stadium: Rochester Rhinos Stadium; Attendance: 4,217; Referee: Charles Murphy

August 6, 2016 22	Rochester Rhinos	2–0	Wilmington Hammerheads FC	Rochester, New York
6:00pm	Volesky 43' dos Santos 46'	Report		Stadium: Rochester Rhinos Stadium

August 13, 2016 23	Louisville City FC	1–1	Rochester Rhinos	Louisville, Kentucky
7:30pm	Craig 84'	Report	Volesky 12'	Stadium: Louisville Slugger Field; Attendance: 6,373

August 20, 2016 24	Rochester Rhinos	3–0	Pittsburgh Riverhounds	Rochester, New York
6:00pm	Tergou 7'; Tergou 39'; Reilly 56'	Report		Stadium: Rochester Rhinos Stadium

August 24, 2016 25	FC Cincinnati	1–1	Rochester Rhinos	Cincinnati, Ohio
7:00pm	Berry 26'	Report	dos Santos 41'	Stadium: Nippert Stadium; Attendance: 14,157

August 27, 2016 26	Wilmington Hammerheads FC	2–2	Rochester Rhinos	Wilmington, North Carolina
7:00pm	Moose 35'; Caldini Perone 90'	Report	Volesky 77'; Fall 90'	Stadium: Legion Stadium

September 3, 2016 27	Charleston Battery	1–2	Rochester Rhinos	Charleston, South Carolina
7:30pm	Portillo 14'	Report	Volesky 24'; Bakayoko 80'	Stadium: MUSC Health Stadium

September 10, 2016 28	Rochester Rhinos	1–1	New York Red Bulls II	Rochester, New York
5:00pm	Samuels 57'	Report	Bezecourt 88'	Stadium: Rochester Rhinos Stadium; Attendance: 3,505

September 17, 2016 29	Charlotte Independence	0–1	Rochester Rhinos	Charlotte, North Carolina
7:00pm		Report	dos Santos 41'	Stadium: Ramblewood Soccer Complex; Attendance: 1,471

September 24, 2016 30	Rochester Rhinos	1–0	Toronto FC II	Rochester, New York
5:00pm	dos Santos 6'	Report		Stadium: Rochester Rhinos Stadium

Schedule source

=== U.S. Open Cup ===
May 18, 2016 Second round	Rochester Rhinos (New York (state))	7–0	(Massachusetts) Southie FC	Rochester, New York
7:00pm	Volesky 5' (pen.); Fortune 8'; Ugarte 29'; Samuels 44', 45', 48'; 79' ??	Report		Stadium: Rochester Rhinos Stadium; Attendance: 1,371; Referee: Stephen Montanino

June 1, 2016 Third round	Rochester Rhinos (New York (state))	2–0	(New York (state)) Lansdowne Bhoys FC	Rochester, New York
7:00pm	Fortune 59'; Volesky 70'			Stadium: Rochester Rhinos Stadium; Attendance: 4,429; Referee: Jaroslaw Werel

June 15, 2016 Fourth round	Rochester Rhinos (New York (state))	0–1	(New York (state)) New York Red Bulls	Rochester, New York
7:00pm		Report	Kljestan 20' (pen.)	Stadium: Rochester Rhinos Stadium; Attendance: 3,596; Referee: Charles Murphy
