= 2020 Pittsburgh Riverhounds SC season =

Pittsburgh Riverhounds SC
2020 season
- Owner: Tuffy Shallenberger
- Head coach: Bob Lilley
- USL Championship: Conference: 3rd Group F: 2nd
- USLC Playoffs: Conference Quarterfinals
- U.S. Open Cup: Cancelled
- Biggest win: 6–0 (July 18 at Philadelphia)
- Biggest defeat: 0–2 (October 10 vs. Louisville City)
Home colors	Away colors	Third colors

The 2020 Pittsburgh Riverhounds SC season was the club's twenty-first season of existence, their third season in the second tier of American soccer, and their tenth season in the league now named the USL Championship (USLC). This article covers the period from November 18, 2019, the day after the 2019 USLC Playoff Final, to the conclusion of the 2020 USLC Playoff Final, scheduled for November 12–16, 2020. Bob Lilley returns for his third season as Riverhounds manager. On March 12, 2020, the Riverhounds announced their season would be suspended for 30 days as a result of the COVID-19 pandemic.

== Roster ==
As of January 15, 2020

No.	Name	Nationality	Position(s)	Date of birth (age)	Signed in	Previous club	Apps	Goals
Goalkeepers
Defenders
4	Dani Rovira	(Colombia)	DF	December 15, 1996 (age 29)	2019	(United States) Vermont Catamounts	0	0
7	Ryan James	(Canada)	DF	April 21, 1994 (age 32)	2019	(United States) Nashville SC	0	0
	Tony Walls	(United States)	DF	January 16, 1990 (age 36)	2020	(United States) Chattanooga Red Wolves	0	0
Midfielders
11	Kenardo Forbes	(Jamaica)	MF	May 15, 1988 (age 38)	2018	(United States) Rochester Rhinos	0	0
15	Anthony Velarde	(United States)	MF	March 8, 1996 (age 30)	2019	(United States) Fresno Pacific Sunbirds	0	0
17	Thomas Vancaeyezeele	(French Guiana)	MF	July 27, 1994 (age 32)	2018	(United States) Charleston Golden Eagles	0	0
24	Robbie Mertz	(United States)	MF	December 4, 1996 (age 29)	2019	(United States) Michigan Wolverines	0	0
Forwards
8	Steevan Dos Santos	(Cape Verde)	FW	September 17, 1989 (age 36)	2019	(Canada) Ottawa Fury FC	0	0
16	Mark Forrest	(England)	FW	December 3, 1996 (age 29)	2019	(United States) Lehigh Mountain Hawks	0	0
9	Lukas Fernandes	(United States)	FW	February 26, 1998 (age 28)	2020	(United States) Temple Owls	0	0

== Competitions ==
=== Exhibitions ===
February 8 Preseason 1	Pittsburgh Riverhounds SC	2–0	Duquesne Dukes	Pittsburgh, PA
7:30PM EST	Fernandes 13'; Velarde 68' (Forbes)	Report		Stadium: Cool Springs Sports Complex

February 9 Preseason 2	Pittsburgh Riverhounds SC	2–0	Villanova Wildcats	Pittsburgh, PA
2:00PM EST	Okonkwo 47', 65'	Report		Stadium: Highmark Stadium

February 15 Preseason 3	Pittsburgh Riverhounds SC	0–2	Penn State Nittany Lions	Pittsburgh, PA
2:00PM EST		Report	45'; 78'	Stadium: Highmark Stadium

February 19 Preseason 4	Pittsburgh Riverhounds SC	1–1	Pittsburgh Panthers	Pittsburgh, PA
7:00PM EST	Fernandes 29' (Kenardo Forbes)	Report	14'	Stadium: Highmark Stadium

February 22 Preseason 5	Pittsburgh Riverhounds SC	2–2	Akron Zips	Pittsburgh, PA
1:00PM EST	Forrest 39'; Griffin 44'	Report	Jackson 60' (Tojaga), 65' (Serra)	Stadium: Highmark Stadium

February 26 Preseason 6	Pittsburgh Riverhounds SC	1–1	Loudoun United FC	Pittsburgh, PA
12:00PM EST	Fernandes 24' (Mertz)	Report	70' (pen.)	Stadium: Highmark Stadium

March 2 Preseason 7	Columbus Crew SC	v	Pittsburgh Riverhounds SC	Columbus, OH
1:00PM EST				Stadium: TBD

March 7 Preseason 8	Pittsburgh Riverhounds SC	v	Toronto FC II	Pittsburgh, PA
2:00PM EST				Stadium: Highmark Stadium

=== USL Championship ===
==== Standings — Group F ====
Pos	Team	Pld	W	D	L	GF	GA	GD	Pts	PPG	Qualification
1	Hartford Athletic	16	11	2	3	31	24	+7	35	2.19	Advance to USL Championship Playoffs
2	Pittsburgh Riverhounds SC	16	11	1	4	39	10	+29	34	2.13	Advance to USL Championship Playoffs
3	New York Red Bulls II	16	5	0	11	30	37	−7	15	0.94	
4	Philadelphia Union II	16	2	3	11	20	45	−25	9	0.56	
5	Loudoun United FC	13	1	3	9	10	28	−18	6	0.46	

Source: USL

==== Match results ====
July 12 1	Louisville City FC	1–3	Pittsburgh Riverhounds SC	Louisville, KY
5:00 PM EDT	Williams 18'	Report	Ashworth (yellow card) 27'; Dover 45'; Mertz 46'; Velarde 51'; Barnathan (yellow card) 90'	Stadium: Lynn Family Stadium; Referee: Eric Tattersall

July 18 2	Philadelphia Union II	0–6	Pittsburgh Riverhounds SC	Chester, PA
6:30 PM EDT	Harriell (yellow card) 58'	Report	Mensah 29'; Griffin 37'; Velarde 59'; Fernandes 67'; Dos Santos 81', 87'	Stadium: Talen Energy Stadium; Referee: Thomas Snyder

July 22 3	Pittsburgh Riverhounds SC	0–1	Indy Eleven	Pittsburgh, PA
6:00 PM EDT	Dover (yellow card) 21'; Griffin (yellow card) 63'; Mertz (yellow card) 74'; Mensah (yellow card) 82'; Velarde (yellow card) 90+5'	Report	Ouimette (yellow card) 31'; Barrett (yellow card) 70'; Pasher 90+7'	Stadium: Highmark Stadium; Referee: Eric Tattersall
Note: Broadcast live on ESPN2

July 26 4	New York Red Bulls II	2–1	Pittsburgh Riverhounds SC	Montclair, NJ
5:00 PM EDT	Sowe 34', (yellow card) 58'; Kilwien (yellow card) 71'; Elney (yellow card) 88'; Corfe 90+5' (pen.)	Report	Thomas 9', (yellow card) 90+1'; Mertz (yellow card) 90+3'	Stadium: MSU Soccer Park; Referee: Luis Arroyo

August 1 5	Pittsburgh Riverhounds SC	4–0	Philadelphia Union II	Pittsburgh, PA
7:00 PM EDT	Dos Santos 22', 42'; Vancaeyezeele 36'; James 65'	Report	Picazo (yellow card) 38'; Aaronson (yellow card) 73'; Flores (yellow card) 88'	Stadium: Highmark Stadium; Referee: Kevin Fikar

August 8 6	Pittsburgh Riverhounds SC	4–1	New York Red Bulls II	Pittsburgh, PA
7:00 PM EDT	Mertz 3' (pen.), 61'; Thomas (yellow card) 15'; Dos Santos (yellow card) 42'; Mensah 65'; Velarde 80'	Report	Bounthong (yellow card) 2'; Toure 90+3'	Stadium: Highmark Stadium; Referee: Austin Saini

August 15 7	Indy Eleven	1–0	Pittsburgh Riverhounds SC	Indianapolis, IN
7:00 PM EDT	Pasher 13'; Ayoze (red card) 50'; Watson (yellow card) 62'; Gibson (yellow card) 80'; Moon (yellow card) 86'	Report	Dos Santos (yellow card) 58'; Velarde (yellow card) 81'	Stadium: Lucas Oil Stadium; Attendance: 5,748; Referee: Lukasz Szpala

August 19 8	Loudoun United FC	0–2	Pittsburgh Riverhounds SC	Leesburg, VA
7:00 PM EDT	Martinez (yellow card) 17' (yellow-red card) 45+1'; Wiedt (yellow card) 58'; Saravia (yellow card) 59'	Report	Dos Santos 7'; Fernandes 11'; Barnathan (yellow card) 50'; Vancaeyezeele (yellow card) 85'	Stadium: Segra Field; Attendance: 452; Referee: Matthew Franz

August 22 9	Pittsburgh Riverhounds SC	2–2	Saint Louis FC	Pittsburgh, PA
7:00 PM EDT	Mensah 16'; Mertz 40'; Thomas (yellow card) 45+3'; Lindstrom (yellow card) 56'	Report	Greig 45+1'; Fall 57'	Stadium: Highmark Stadium; Referee: Kevin Fikar

August 28 10	Hartford Athletic	0–3	Pittsburgh Riverhounds SC	Hartford, CT
7:00 PM EDT	Lara (yellow card) 83'	Report	Gómez (yellow card) 7'; James 11', 50'; Griffin 22'	Stadium: Dillon Stadium; Attendance: 1,375; Referee: Jeremy Scheer

September 1 11	Pittsburgh Riverhounds SC	3–0	Loudoun United	Pittsburgh, PA
7:00 PM EDT	Forrest 5' (pen.); Velarde 8' (pen.); Dikwa (yellow card) 66', (goal) 88'	Report	Fawole (penalty missed) 17'; Amoh (yellow card) 38'; Ndour (yellow card) 55'; Williamson (yellow card) 71'	Stadium: Highmark Stadium; Referee: Joshua Encarnación

September 5 12	New York Red Bulls II	0–3	Pittsburgh Riverhounds SC	Harrison, NJ
5:00 PM EDT	Kilwien (yellow card) 11'; Boateng (yellow card) 16'; Dieye (yellow card) 26'; Rito (yellow card) 45+2'	Report	Lindstrom (yellow card) 23'; Mensah 45'; Kilwien 51' (o.g.); Mertz 58'; Dover (yellow card) 86'	Stadium: Red Bull Arena; Attendance: 0 Referee: Adam Kilpatrick

September 12 13	Pittsburgh Riverhounds SC	5–0	Hartford Athletic	Pittsburgh, PA
7:00 PM EDT	James 13', 47'; Mensah 27', 61'; Velarde 42' (pen.)	Report	Strong (yellow card) 39'; Torres (yellow card) 81'; Naglestad (yellow card) 82'; Haak (yellow card) 83'	Stadium: Highmark Stadium; Referee: Eric Tattersall

September 19 14	Loudoun United FC	0–1	Pittsburgh Riverhounds SC	Leesburg, VA
6:30 PM EDT	Fawole (yellow card) 37'; Saravia (yellow card) 45+4' (yellow-red card) 90+4'	Report	Vancaeyezeele (yellow card) 51'; Dikwa 81'; Walls (yellow card) 90+2'	Stadium: Segra Field; Referee: John Griggs

September 26 15	Pittsburgh Riverhounds SC	0–1	Hartford Athletic	Pittsburgh, PA
7:00 PM EDT	Dos Santos (yellow card) 72'	Report	Guzmán (penalty missed) 30', 36'; Silva (yellow card) 47'; Politz (yellow card) 50'; Barrera (yellow card) 64'; Mandanda (red card) 71'; Novotny (yellow card) 89'; Haak (yellow card) 90+5'	Stadium: Highmark Stadium; Referee: Joshua Encarnación

October 3 16	Pittsburgh Riverhounds SC	2–1	Philadelphia Union II	Pittsburgh, PA
7:00 PM EDT	Lee 15', (yellow card) 37'; Thomas (yellow card) 61'; Dos Santos (yellow card) 70'; Dikwa 90+2'	Report	Cole Turner (yellow card) 43'; Jack McGlynn 63' (pen.), (yellow card) 90+1'	Stadium: Highmark Stadium; Referee: Austin Saini

==== USL Cup Playoffs ====
October 10 Conf. Quarterfinals	Louisville City FC	2–0	Pittsburgh Riverhounds SC	Louisville, KY
7:00 PM EDT	Lancaster 17'; Souahy (yellow card) 26'; Hoppenot (yellow card) 29'; Jimenez (yellow card) 53'; Bone 86'	Report	Thomas (yellow card) 45'	Stadium: Lynn Family Stadium; Attendance: 4,900; Referee: Elton Garcia

=== U.S. Open Cup ===
As a USL Championship club, the Riverhounds will enter the competition in the Second Round, to be played April 7–9.

April 7 2nd Round	Pittsburgh Riverhounds SC (Pennsylvania)	P–P	(Pennsylvania) West Chester United SC or (Pennsylvania) Vereinigung Erzgebirge	Pittsburgh, PA
7:00 PM EDT				Stadium: Highmark Stadium
Note: Match postponed due to the COVID-19 pandemic
