= Ryan James (soccer) =

Canadian soccer player (born 1994)

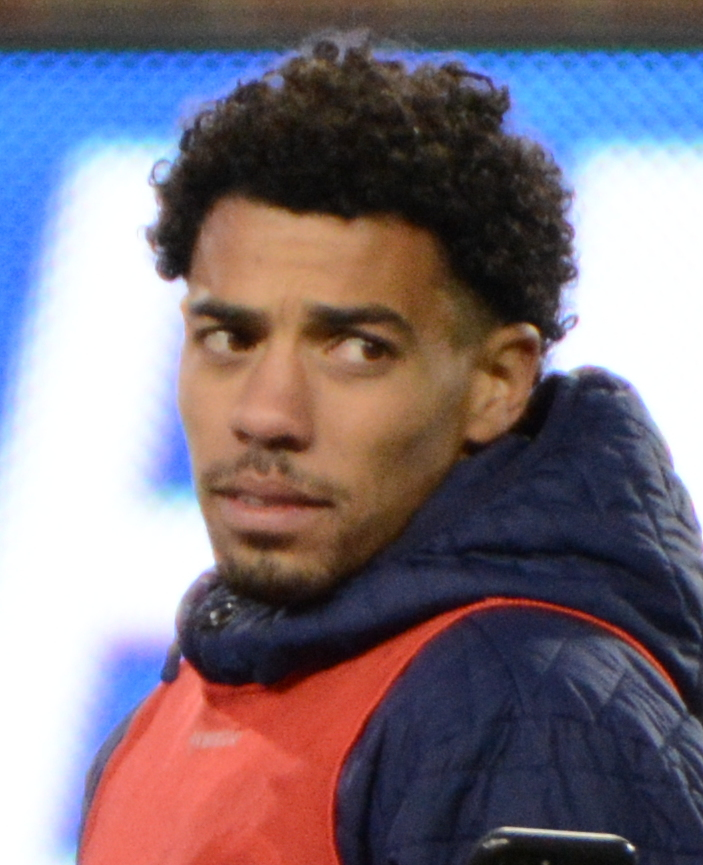
- James with Nashville SC in 2018

Personal information
- Full name: Ryan Lee James
- Date of birth: April 21, 1994 (age 32)
- Place of birth: Mississauga, Ontario, Canada
- Height: 1.76 m (5 ft 9 in)
- Position: Defender

Youth career
- –2011: Dixie SC
- 2012: Toronto FC

College career
Years	Team	Apps	(Gls)
2012–2015	Bowling Green Falcons	79	(9)

Senior career*
Years	Team	Apps	(Gls)
2012	TFC Academy		
2015	Toronto FC III	1	(0)
2016–2017	Rochester Rhinos	59	(1)
2018	Nashville SC	16	(0)
2019–2020	Pittsburgh Riverhounds SC	50	(5)
2021–2022	Birmingham Legion FC	59	(1)
2023	HFX Wanderers	6	(0)
2024–	Scrosoppi FC	14	(0)
2024–	→ Scrosoppi FC B	1	(1)
- * Club domestic league appearances and goals as of August 11, 2024

Ryan Lee James (born April 21, 1994) is a Canadian professional soccer player who plays as a defender for Scrosoppi FC in League1 Ontario.

== Early life ==
James began playing youth soccer at age four with Dixie SC. He later joined the Toronto FC Academy. He was a member of the Ontario provincial team at both the U14 and U16 levels, winning a silver medal at both national tournaments.

== College career ==
In 2012, he committed to attend Bowling Green University to play for the men's soccer team. On September 9, 2012, James recorded his first collegiate goal and his first assist in a 3–3 draw against the Coastal Carolina Chanticleers. On October 30, 2012, he scored a brace in a 3–2 victory over the Wright State Raiders, which earned him Bowling Green's Athlete of the Week honours. In his sophomore season, he was named to the OCSA Academic All-Ohio Second Team and also earned honourable mention honours for the Academic All-MAC Team.

In his junior season, he was named to the NSCAA All-Great Lakes Region Third Team, the All-MAC Second-Team, All-Ohio Second Team, Academic All-MAC Team, a MAC Distinguished Scholar Athlete, and an Academic All-Ohio First Team.

Ahead of his senior season, he was named a team captain. He was named a finalist for the Senior CLASS Award, was named to the All-MAC Second Team, Academic All-MAC Team, MAC Distinguished Scholar Athlete, and was the male recipient of Bowling Green's Medal of Honor. Ahead of the MLS SuperDraft, he was invited to the MLS Combine. Over his four seasons, he played in all 79 of the team's games, scoring nine goals and adding 15 assists.

== Club career ==
In 2012, James began playing with the TFC Academy in the first division of the Canadian Soccer League. He also appeared with TFC Academy in a Premier Development League match in 2015.

At the 2016 MLS SuperDraft, James was drafted in the third round (52nd overall) by Sporting Kansas City. He attended pre-season with the team, however, he did not ultimately sign with the club.

In March 2016, James signed with the Rochester Rhinos of the USL.

In December 2017, James signed with Nashville SC in the USL, for the 2018 season.

In November 2018, James signed a one-year contract, with a club option for 2020 with Pittsburgh Riverhounds SC. In April 2019, he was named to the USL Championship Team of the Week for the first time. He scored his first goal for the Riverhounds on August 1, 2020, against Philadelphia Union II. After scoring a brace against the Hartford Athletic on August 28, 2020, James was named USL Championship Player of the Week (and named to the Team of the Week). After another two-goal performance against the Hartford Athletic on September 12, he was once again named to the Team of the Week. For the 2020 season, he was named the Steel Army (the Riverhounds' supporters group) Player of the Year.

In December 2020, James signed a multi-year contract with Birmingham Legion FC. He scored his first goal for the Legion on July 9, 2022, against the Charleston Battery. In July 2022, he was named to the USL Team of the Week.

In February 2023, he signed a one-year contract with a club option for 2024, with the HFX Wanderers in the Canadian Premier League. He was named an assistant captain for the 2023 season. He made his debut for the club on April 15, 2023, against Atlético Ottawa. In July 2023, it was announced that he would miss the remainder of the season after undergoing surgery due to injury. In December 2023, the Wanderers declined his option for 2024.

== International career ==
He made his debut in the Canadian national program attending a camp with the Canada U17 team in August 2010, later attending a second camp in November 2010.

== Personal life ==
James is the younger brother of Evan James, who is also a professional soccer player. In September 2022, he was the inaugural recipient of the Coaching License Scholarship from Kwik Goal, the United Soccer League, and US Soccer, and will begin with B coaching license training with the United States Soccer Federation.

== Career statistics ==
As of August 31, 2024

Club	League	Season	League		Playoffs		Domestic Cup		Other		Total	
Club	League	Season	Apps	Goals	Apps	Goals	Apps	Goals	Apps	Goals	Apps	Goals
Toronto FC III	Premier Development League	2015	1	0	—		—		—		1	0
Rochester Rhinos	USL	2016	27	1	2	0	0	0	—		29	1
Rochester Rhinos	USL	2017	32	0	2	0	1	0	—		35	0
Rochester Rhinos	Total		59	1	4	0	1	0	0	0	64	1
Nashville SC	USL	2018	16	0	0	0	3	0	—		19	0
Pittsburgh Riverhounds SC	USL Championship	2019	34	0	2	0	2	0	—		38	0
Pittsburgh Riverhounds SC	USL Championship	2020	16	5	1	0	—		—		17	5
Pittsburgh Riverhounds SC	Total		50	5	3	0	2	0	0	0	55	5
Birmingham Legion FC	USL Championship	2021	32	0	1	0	—		—		33	0
Birmingham Legion FC	USL Championship	2022	27	1	1	0	2	0	—		30	1
Birmingham Legion FC	Total		59	1	2	0	2	0	0	0	63	1
HFX Wanderers FC	Canadian Premier League	2023	6	0	0	0	0	0	—		6	0
Scrosoppi FC	League1 Ontario	2024	14	0	—		—		1	0	15	0
Scrosoppi FC B	League2 Ontario	2024	1	1	0	0	—		1	1	2	2
Career Total			206	8	9	0	8	0	2	1	225	9
