= Michel Guilavogui =

Guinean footballer

Personal information
- Date of birth: 12 December 1993 (age 32)
- Place of birth: Matam, Guinea
- Position: Midfielder

Senior career*
Years	Team	Apps	(Gls)
2012–2014	Desportivo da Praia		
2014–2016	Boavista FC (Cape Verde)		
2016	Rochester Rhinos	15	(0)
- * Club domestic league appearances and goals as of 7 October 2016

Michel Guilavogui (born 12 December 1993) is a Guinean footballer who most recently played for the Rochester Rhinos in United Soccer League.

== Career ==
Guilavogui signed with United Soccer League side Rochester Rhinos from Boavista FC (Cape Verde) on 14 May 2016. He made his debut the same day in a 0–0 draw with the Charlotte Independence. At the end of the 2016 season, Guilavogui was not one of the ten players listed as under contract for the following season.
