= Ryan Felix =

American soccer player (born 1993)

Personal information
- Full name: Ryan Allen Felix
- Date of birth: June 21, 1993 (age 33)
- Place of birth: Los Angeles, California, United States
- Height: 1.91 m (6 ft 3 in)
- Position: Centre-back

College career
Years	Team	Apps	(Gls)
2011–2014	Loyola Marymount Lions	61	(3)

Senior career*
Years	Team	Apps	(Gls)
2013–2014	FC Tucson	17	(1)
2015–2016	Orange County Blues	24	(0)
2017	Rochester Rhinos	33	(1)
2018	San Antonio FC	16	(0)
2019	Tampa Bay Rowdies	1	(0)
- * Club domestic league appearances and goals as of October 24, 2019

Ryan Allen Felix (born June 21, 1993) is an American soccer player who plays as a centre-back.

== Club career ==
Felix began his professional career at FC Tucson at age 19.

He played two seasons at the Orange County Blues, as a center back and a holding midfielder.

In 2017, Felix played 33 matches with the Rochester Rhinos, scoring one goal. He left the club the following season and went to San Antonio, where he played 16 matches in 2018.

For the 2019 season, Felix signed for the Rowdies. He made a total of one appearance, which was as a substitute.
