= Jochen Graf =

American footballer (born 1989)

Personal information
- Date of birth: November 15, 1989 (age 36)
- Place of birth: Double Oak, Texas, United States
- Height: 6 ft 0 in (1.83 m)
- Position: Forward

Youth career
- Dallas Texans

College career
Years	Team	Apps	(Gls)
2008	SMU Mustangs	0	(0)
2009–2012	Bradley Braves	77	(15)

Senior career*
Years	Team	Apps	(Gls)
2013	A.A.C. Eagles		
2013	TSV Hertha Walheim	7	(2)
2014	Lidköpings FK		
2015	Carlstad United BK	20	(2)
2016	Oskarshamns AIK	23	(3)
2017	Rochester Rhinos	30	(11)
2018	Tampa Bay Rowdies	15	(0)
2018	→ Reno 1868 (loan)	3	(1)
2019	New York Cosmos	0	(0)
2019	Memphis 901	17	(0)
- * Club domestic league appearances and goals as of March 10, 2020

Jochen Graf (born November 15, 1989) is an American former professional soccer player.

== Early life ==
Graf was born in College Station but raised in Dallas, Texas, and played for the Dallas Texans and Andromeda 90. Graf won back-to-back USYS national championships in 2017 and 2018 where he won the golden boot both years and scored the opening goal of the final in 2017.

== Career ==
After redshirting his freshman season at Southern Methodist University in 2008, Graf played fours years of college soccer at Bradley University between 2009 and 2012, where he made a total of 77 appearances and scored 15 goals.

After spells in Germany and Sweden, Graf returned to the United States in 2017, when he signed for United Soccer League club Rochester Rhinos. On April 1, 2017, Graf scored the winning goal on his debut, giving Rochester a 3–2 victory over Bethlehem Steel FC.

Graf signed with USL side Tampa Bay Rowdies on January 4, 2018.

On 3 January 31, 2019, Graf joined the New York Cosmos.

On April 25, 2019, Graf signed for USL Championship side Memphis 901 ahead of their inaugural season. After playing professional soccer for 9 seasons, Graf announced his retirement and settled in to St. Petersburg with his wife, Kelli Haemmelmann.

=== Retirement ===
On October 18, 2019, Graf announced his retirement from professional soccer.

== Personal life ==
On December 5, 2020, Graf married former DI college player at FGCU, former professional soccer player for Washington Spirit and marketing executive, Kelli Haemmelmann.

Graf currently works as a sports agent at Sports Entertainment Group, a football agency based in The Netherlands. He is responsible for the North American Region and is noted for penning deals for Emmanuel Latte Lath, Mateusz Klich, Tomas Chancalay, Preston Judd, Maarten Paes and other MLS players.
