= Uchenna Uzo =

Nigerian footballer (born 1992)

Personal information
- Date of birth: December 27, 1992 (age 33)
- Place of birth: Lagos, Nigeria
- Height: 1.80 m (5 ft 11 in)
- Position: Defender

College career
| Years | Team | Apps | (Gls) |
| 2012–2014 | Coastal Carolina Chanticleers | 71 | (4) |

Senior career*
| Years | Team | Apps | (Gls) |
| 2013 | K-W United | 11 | (1) |
| 2016–2017 | Phoenix Rising | 24 | (0) |
| 2019 | Pittsburgh Riverhounds | 6 | (0) |
| 2020 | Chattanooga Red Wolves | 4 | (0) |
| 2021 | FC Arizona | 6 | (0) |

International career
- Nigeria U17
- * Club domestic league appearances and goals as of October 25, 2020

Uchenna Uzo (born December 27, 1992) is a Nigerian footballer who currently plays as a defender. His brother is fellow footballer Tobenna Uzo.

== Career ==
=== College and amateur ===
Uzo played three years of college soccer at Coastal Carolina University between 2012 and 2014. He had attended Houston Baptist University in 2011, but didn't compete athletically.

While at college, Uzo played with K-W United in the Premier Development League during their 2013 season.

=== Professional ===
Uzo signed with United Soccer League side Arizona United in March 2016.

Uzo joined USL League One side Chattanooga Red Wolves SC in January 2020.

In 2021, Uzo played with National Premier Soccer League side FC Arizona, making six appearances.
