= Darius Madison =

American professional soccer player (born 1994)

Personal information
- Date of birth: May 31, 1994 (age 32)
- Place of birth: Philadelphia, Pennsylvania, United States
- Height: 5 ft 8 in (1.73 m)
- Position: Forward

Youth career
- 2008–2011: La Salle College High School
- 2011–2012: Philadelphia Union

College career
Years	Team	Apps	(Gls)
2012–2014	Virginia Cavaliers	59	(12)
2015	UMBC Retrievers	13	(6)

Senior career*
Years	Team	Apps	(Gls)
2013–2015	Reading United	21	(9)
2016	Kitsap Pumas	10	(1)
2017	Rochester Rhinos	18	(3)
2018–2019	North Geelong Warriors	49	(29)
- * Club domestic league appearances and goals as of 15 July 2019 (UTC)

Darius Madison (born May 31, 1994) is an American professional soccer player.

== Career ==
Madison played fours years of college soccer, including three years at the University of Virginia and a single year at the University of Maryland, Baltimore County.

Madison also played with USL PDL side Reading United from 2013 to 2015.

On January 19, 2016, Madison was selected in the fourth round (70th overall) of the 2016 MLS SuperDraft by Toronto FC. However, he wasn't signed by the club and instead joined PDL side Kitsap Pumas for their 2016 season.

Madison signed with United Soccer League club Rochester Rhinos on February 13, 2017.

In February 2018, Madison moved to Geelong, Australia, signing for North Geelong Warriors FC, a club competing in the National Premier Leagues Victoria 2. Madison started life at his new club by scoring on debut, the winner in a 1–0 win over Melbourne Victory FC Reserves at Epping Stadium. Madison finished the season with 13 goals, the third highest tally in NPL2 West. At the club's end-of-season awards night, Madison claimed the Fans' Player of the Year award.
