= Tobi Adewole =

American soccer player (born 1995)

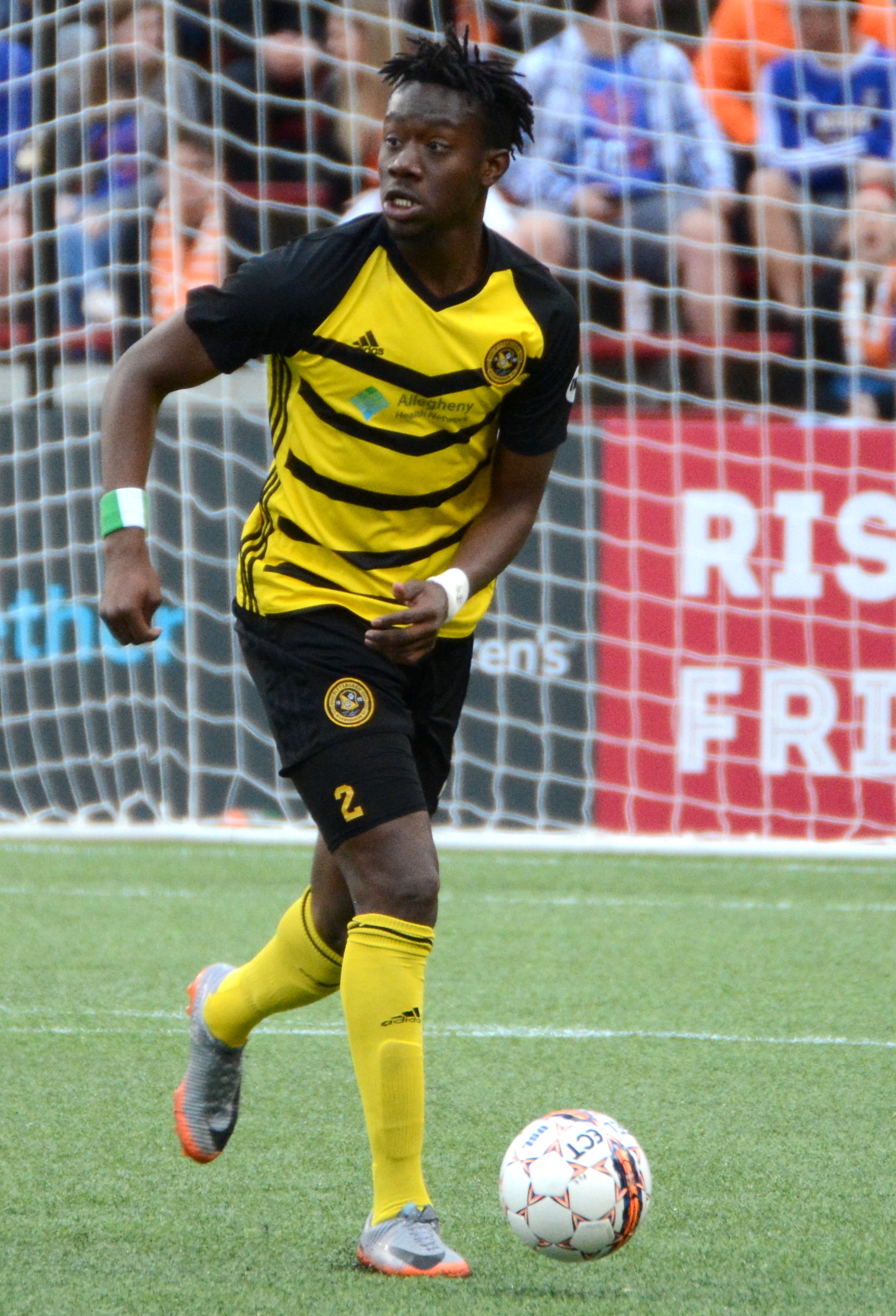
- Adewole playing for Pittsburgh Riverhounds in 2018

Personal information
- Full name: Oluwatobiloba A. Adewole
- Date of birth: October 14, 1995 (age 31)
- Place of birth: Cheverly, Maryland, United States
- Height: 1.91 m (6 ft 3 in)
- Position: Center-back

Team information
- Current team: Chattanooga Red Wolves
- Number: 2

College career
Years	Team	Apps	(Gls)
2013–2016	George Washington Colonials	64	(5)

Senior career*
Years	Team	Apps	(Gls)
2016	Jersey Express	4	(0)
2017–2019	Pittsburgh Riverhounds	74	(3)
2020	Saint Louis	12	(0)
2021	Phoenix Rising	9	(0)
2021	Indy Eleven	6	(0)
2022	Colorado Springs Switchbacks	5	(0)
2022–2023	RW Koblenz	32	(0)
2023–2024	Greifswald	22	(0)
2025	Westchester	9	(1)
2025	Charlotte Independence	4	(0)
2026–	Chattanooga Red Wolves	25	(5)
- * Club domestic league appearances and goals as of October 31, 2026

Oluwatobiloba "Tobi" A. Adewole (born October 14, 1995) is an American professional soccer player who plays as a center-back for USL League One club Chattanooga Red Wolves.

== Career ==
Born in Cheverly, Maryland, Adewole played for various youth soccer clubs, namely Olney BGC, Bethesda SC, and Potomac SC. In 2013, Adewole enrolled at George Washington University, where he played for his college's soccer team, the George Washington Colonials. While at college, he also played four matches for the Jersey Express of the USL Premier Development League in 2016.

=== Pittsburgh Riverhounds ===
On January 9, 2017, Adewole signed a one-year deal with the Pittsburgh Riverhounds of the United Soccer League after impressing then-head coach Dave Brandt in an open trial.

Adewole made his professional debut on July 4, starting for the Riverhounds in their 1–3 loss against Charlotte Independence. The next season, on April 14, 2018, he scored his first professional goal in a 1–0 victory over Ottawa Fury FC at Highmark Stadium.

During the 2019 season, Adewole started almost every match for the Riverhounds, forming a formidable partnership with Joseph Greenspan and Thomas Vancaeyezeele in defense. He scored his first goal of the season on March 23 against Swope Park Rangers, his 71st-minute goal being the equalizer in a 2–2 game.

In December 2019, it was announced that Adewole was out of contract with the Riverhounds.

=== Saint Louis FC ===
Prior to the 2020 season, Adewole joined another Championship club, Saint Louis FC. He made his debut for the club on July 11 in a 0–2 defeat against Indy Eleven. Adewole completed his season with Saint Louis FC with just 12 appearances.

=== Phoenix Rising ===
On December 1, 2020, Adewole signed with Championship club Phoenix Rising. He made his debut for the club on April 30, 2021, as a starter in a 4–1 victory over San Diego Loyal. After 9 games, Adewole and Phoenix Rising mutually agreed to part ways on September 8.

=== Indy Eleven ===
On September 24, 2021, Adewole was signed by Indy Eleven and made his club debut on September 29, 2021.

=== Colorado Springs Switchbacks ===
On April 22, 2022, he signed with Colorado Springs Switchbacks.

=== RW Koblenz ===
Adewole signed with German Regionalliga Südwest side RW Koblenz in late July 2022.

=== Greifswalder FC ===
On 18 July 2023, Greifswalder FC announced the signing of Adewole. They won the Mecklenburg-Vorpommern state cup and finished 2nd place in the Regionalliga Nordost.

=== Westchester SC ===
On 7 March 2025, Adewole joined USL League One club Westchester SC ahead of their inaugural season.

=== Charlotte Independence ===
On September 10, 2025, Adewole made the move to fellow USL League One side Charlotte Independence.

=== Chattanooga Red Wolves ===
Adewole joined USL League One side Chattanooga Red Wolves SC ahead of their 2026 season.

== International ==
Adewole is able to represent both the United States and Nigeria. In April 2018, he said "I want to play for Nigeria. I’m just 22 and believe I can contribute a lot to the national team."

== Career statistics ==
As of match played July 10, 2021

Appearances and goals by club, season and competition
Club	Season	League			National Cup		Continental		Total	
Club	Season	Division	Apps	Goals	Apps	Goals	Apps	Goals	Apps	Goals
Jersey Express	2016	USL PDL	4	0	—		—		4	0
Pittsburgh Riverhounds	2017	United Soccer League	15	0	0	0	—		15	0
Pittsburgh Riverhounds	2018	United Soccer League	24	1	2	0	—		26	1
Pittsburgh Riverhounds	2019	USL Championship	35	2	3	0	—		38	2
Pittsburgh Riverhounds	Total		74	3	5	0	0	0	79	3
Saint Louis FC	2020	USL Championship	12	0	—		—		12	0
Phoenix Rising	2021	USL Championship	9	0	—		—		9	0
Career total			95	3	5	0	0	0	100	3

== Personal life ==
Adewole's parents were Nigerian immigrants who moved to Washington D.C. for work. His oldest brother, Tomi, played college soccer for the Villanova Wildcats, and his sister, Teju, was a sprinter for the Princeton Tigers.
