= Sofiane Tergou =

French footballer (born 1991)

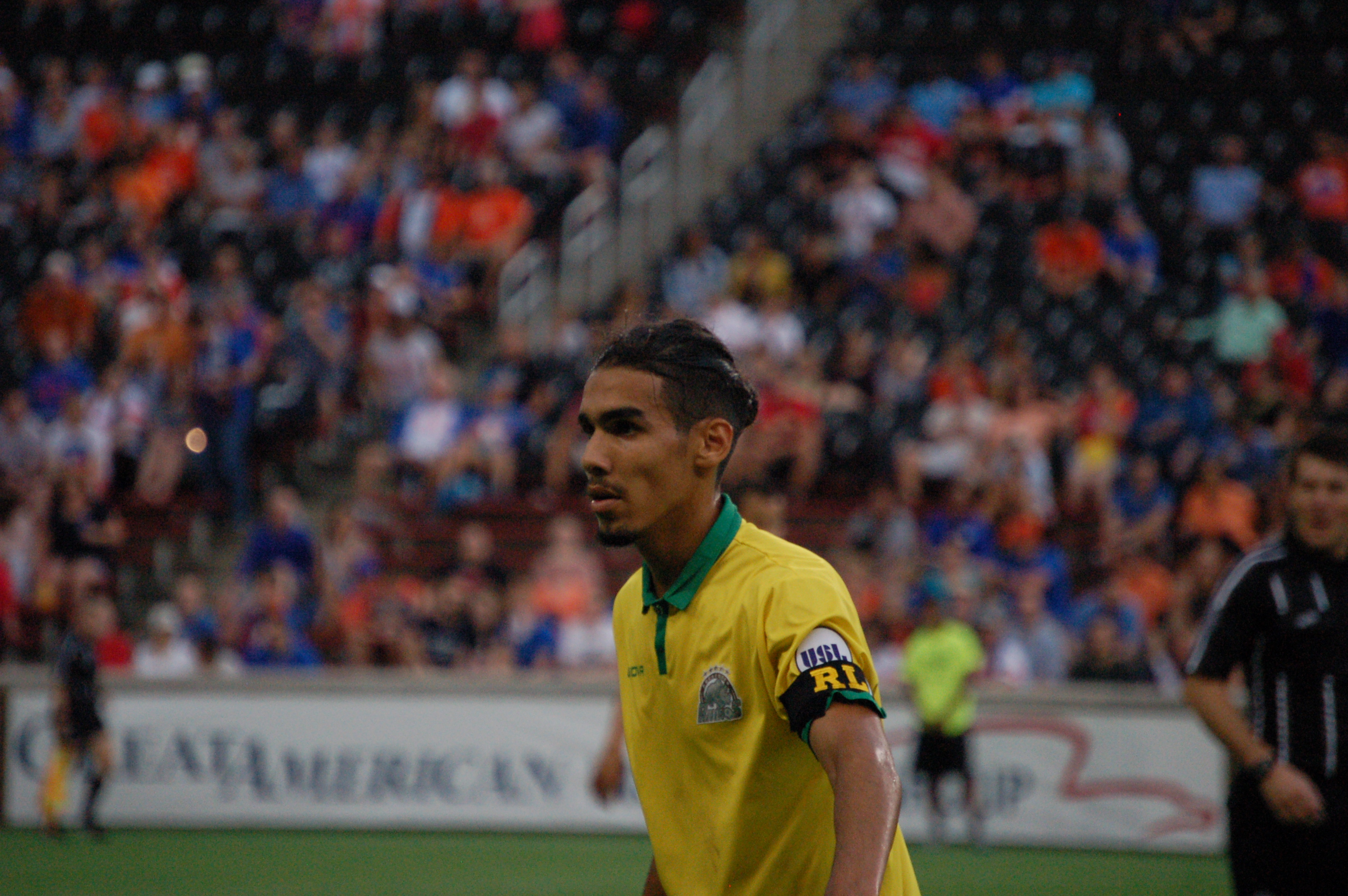
- Tergou in 2016

Personal information
- Date of birth: September 3, 1991 (age 35)
- Place of birth: Strasbourg, France
- Height: 1.84 m (6 ft 0 in)
- Position: Midfielder

Youth career
- 2002–2010: Sarreguemines FC

College career
Years	Team	Apps	(Gls)
2014–2015	SNHU Penmen	41	(13)

Senior career*
Years	Team	Apps	(Gls)
2012–2014	Sarre-Union	50	(6)
2015	Seacoast United Phantoms	14	(1)
2016–2017	Rochester Rhinos	42	(3)
2019	Sarre-Union	7	(0)
- * Club domestic league appearances and goals as of 19:33, 25 August 2020 (UTC)

Sofiane Tergou (born 3 September 1991) is a French footballer.

== Career ==
After two seasons in France with US Sarre-Union, Tergou moved to the United States to attend Southern New Hampshire University, where he would continue his studies after attending the University of Strasbourg.

While playing at SNHU, Tergou played with Premier Development League side Seacoast United Phantoms in 2015.

Tergou signed with United Soccer League side Rochester Rhinos on 14 May 2016.
