= Anthony Velarde =

American soccer player

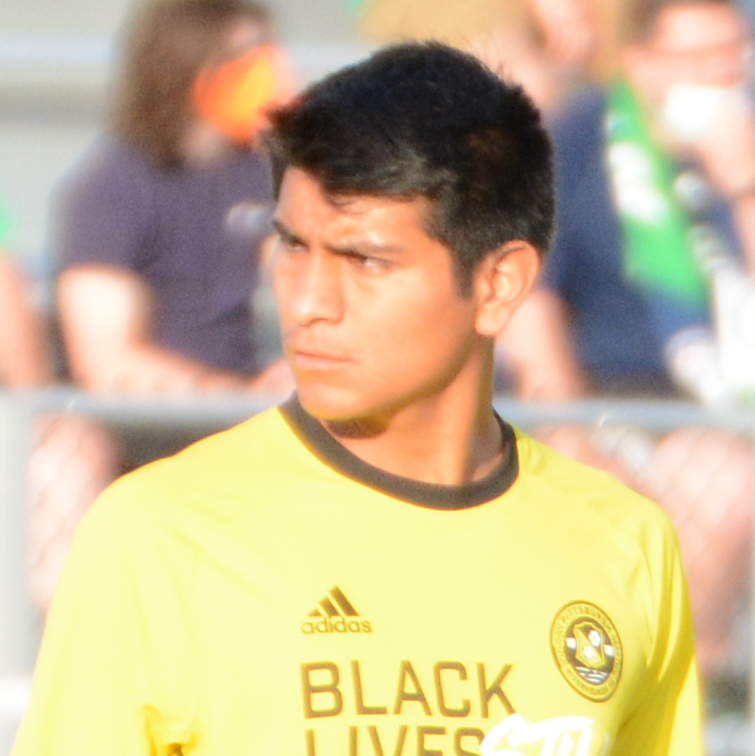
- Velarde with Pittsburgh Riverhounds in 2021

Personal information
- Date of birth: March 8, 1996 (age 30)
- Place of birth: Reedley, California, United States
- Height: 5 ft 7 in (1.70 m)
- Position: Midfielder

College career
Years	Team	Apps	(Gls)
2014–2018	Fresno Pacific Sunbirds	71	(25)

Senior career*
Years	Team	Apps	(Gls)
2017	Fresno Fuego	7	(0)
2019–2021	Pittsburgh Riverhounds	69	(10)
2022	Central Valley Fuego	6	(0)
- * Club domestic league appearances and goals as of October 16, 2022

Anthony Velarde (born March 8, 1996) is an American professional soccer player who plays as a midfielder.

== Career ==
=== Pittsburgh Riverhounds ===
On January 14, 2019, Veldare signed with USL Championship side Pittsburgh Riverhounds.

=== Central Valley Fuego ===
On January 4, 2022, Velarde become the first ever player for Central Valley Fuego ahead of their inaugural season in USL League One.
