= Mike Garzi =

American soccer player

Personal information
- Full name: Michael Joseph Garzi
- Date of birth: March 1, 1991 (age 35)
- Place of birth: New Milford, Connecticut, U.S.
- Height: 5 ft 8 in (1.73 m)
- Position: Midfielder

College career
Years	Team	Apps	(Gls)
2009–2012	Colgate Raiders		

Senior career*
Years	Team	Apps	(Gls)
2014–2017	Rochester Rhinos	91	(4)
- * Club domestic league appearances and goals as of 10:26, 20 October 2017 (UTC)

Michael Joseph Garzi (born March 1, 1991) is an American retired soccer player.

== Career ==
=== College and amateur ===
Garzi played four years of college soccer at Colgate University between 2009 and 2012.

=== Professional ===
Garzi signed his first professional deal with USL Pro club Rochester Rhinos on March 24, 2014. Won National Championship with Rochester in 2015 and was named the Community Service award winner for representing the organization within the community. Named Captain of the 2016 team and lead the team to the Eastern Conference Semi Finals against the NY Red Bulls.

He retired in 2017 at the end of his fourth season with the Rochester Rhinos. He played in over 100 games for the club and now resides in Rochester.

== Personal life ==
Born on March 1, 1991, in New Milford, CT. Family includes Joe and Brenda Garzi (parents), Caitlin Garzi (sister) and Sarah Garzi (wife).
