= 2024 Louisville City FC season =

Season of a professional football team

Louisville City FC
2024 season
- Owner: John Neace
- Manager: Danny Cruz
- Stadium: Lynn Family Stadium
- USL: Eastern Conf.: 1st
- U.S. Open Cup: Round of 32
- USL Playoffs: Qualified
- Top goalscorer: League: Wilson Harris (19); All: Wilson Harris (20)
- Highest home attendance: 13,526 (8–17 vs. CHS)
- Lowest home attendance: 6,197 (9–28 vs. MEM)
- Average home league attendance: 9,704
- Biggest win: 6–0 (4–27 vs. HFD)
- Biggest defeat: 2–5 (6–22 vs. RI)
Home colors	Away colors	Third colors

The 2024 Louisville City FC season was the club's tenth season of competition. Louisville City competes in the USL Championship, the second tier of professional soccer in the United States.

== Background ==
The previous season was the second consecutive season where the USL played a 34-match schedule divided into two conferences with both conferences having a single table. While being the first where all sides from both conferences played against each other.

The USL Regular season was historically bad as Louisville finished fifth in the Eastern Conference; the lowest in team history. The team also set record lows in average points per game (1.47) and goal differential (-3) as they were shutout a record nine times. Leading to the first season where Louisville reached double digit losses. In the USL Playoff Louisville returned to form as they reached the Eastern Conference finals for the ninth consecutive season. Upsetting Memphis 901 FC in the Conference Quarter-finals before falling to the Charleston in the Conference Finals. In the U.S. Open Cup opened the competition by defeating Lexington SC. Their first competitive match against a fellow club from the state of Kentucky. Before falling the FC Cincinnati in the next round.

Following the season Sean Totsch was selected for the all league team. While Oliver Semmle set a USL Championship Rookie record with 12 clean sheets.

== Summary ==
=== Pre-season ===
During the offseason Louisville City went through a generational shift that saw twelve players leave the club. This included long time captain Paolo DelPiccolo who retired from on field play to take a coaching position with the team and all-time leading goal scorer Cameron Lancaster signing with Lexington SC. Furthermore, Louisville was able to transfer two players to other clubs for a fee as goalkeeper Oliver Semmle transferred to MLS side Philadelphia Union and defender Manny Perez became the third Louisville player to transfer directly to a European league when he was transferred to AC Horsens of the Danish 1st Division. In return eleven new players were signed before the start of the regular season with most of which having previous USL experience. The preeminent signing was Arturo Ordoñez, the reigning USL Defensive Player of the year, from rival Pittsburgh. In addition three goal keepers were added to the roster with Damian Las becoming the first choice keeper after being loaned for the season from Austin FC.

Louisville played seven preseason friendlies compiling a record of 4 wins, 2 draws, and 1 loss. Which included two matches against MLS sides; a 2–2 draw against Austin and 1–2 victory against St. Louis. The lone loss was a one-goal affair against Pittsburgh. The most significant event during these matches was an injury to team captain Brian Ownby who injured his leg in the final friendly against Knoxville. This injury required surgery and caused him to miss a significant amount of time.

=== March and April ===
Louisville kicked off the USL regular season away from home against Western Conference Side El Paso in a match were seven players made their debuts for the team. The match remained scoreless until the second half when Wilson Harris scored the games only goal after a Sean Totsch cross. This was the 50th USL Champsionship goal of Harris' career making him the fastest player to 50 goals in USL history. On the defensive side of the ball Damian Las earned his first USL Championship clean sheet. Louisville's next game was their home opener against Pittsburgh which was the first of three consecutive games at home. In this match Louisville and Pittsburgh would trade goals as Harris scored his second goal in as many games in first half stoppage time while Edward Kizza scored an equalizer in the 59th minute. Six minutes later Louisville would retake the lead after Ray Serrano was fouled in the box leading to successful penalty kick by Sean Totsch. In stoppage time Serrano would add his first goal of the year leading to a 3–1 Louisville victory. To close out March Louisville played Birmingham and turned in its first five-goal performance since July 2022. Four different players found the back of the net as Taylor Davila and Jake Morris scored their first goals in a Louisville jersey while Harris registered a brace. For the second consecutive match Serrano would score Louisville final goal while Las made three saves as Louisville won 5–0. With four goals in three matches Harris was voted March's USL Player of the Month. The first Louisville player to earn that earn that honor since Cameron Lancaster in 2018.

To begin April Louisville hosted the Indy Eleven in the first edition of LIPAFC of the 2024 season. In a match that was given the honor of being the first ever USL championship match to be broadcast nationwide on network TV as part of the USL's media rights agreement with CBS. The match was a high scoring affair with Harris scoring the opening goal in the 16th minute. Indy would then level the score on a penalty kick by Jack Blake only for Wilson to put Louisville back in front before the half time whistle. To begin the second half Louisville and Indy again traded goals as Elijah Wynder scored his first goal of the year while Blake scored his second of the match. Then, an hour into the match Harris found the back of the net twice within a span of ten minutes earning the first hat-trick of his professional career as well as the first hat-trick of the USL season and LIPAFC history. In the final ten minutes of the match Indy would score a third and final goal as Louisville went on to win in front of a crowd of over 11,000. Their largest crowd of the season to that point. The final score line of 5–3 set LIPAFC records for the most goals by a single team as well as the highest combined score. It was also the first time in team history that Louisville has had consecutive 5 goal performances. In addition it was also Wesley Charpie 100th appearance for the club.

Three days later Louisville returned to the road to face Charleston in a rematch of the previous year's Eastern Conference final in front of a soldout crowd. Louisville struck first when Jorge Gonzalez scored his first goal of the season in the 9th minute only for Charleston to pull level one minute later when MD Myers scored off of a shot that rebounded off of the goalposts. Approximately 10 minutes later Kyle Adams was called for a handball in box giving a Charleston penalty kick. Markanich successfully converted the penalty giving Charleston the lead and Louisville their first deficit of the season. Markanich scored again in the 30th minute allowing Charleston to go into half time with a 3–1 lead. In the second half Louisville reduced the deficit to one when new signing Taylor Davila scored his first goal for the club. Louisville conceded another penalty in 84th minute which was subsequently saved by Las. However, the first half goals proved too much and Louisville went on to lose their first game of the season. The loss ended Louisville four match winning streak as well as ending Harris' four match goal scoring streak. Louisville returned to their winning ways during the next match when it travelled to face Loudon. Although Louisville earned all three points this match the first of the year where a Louisville player failed to find the back of the net as the only goal of the game was a 67th minute own goal by Loudon's Florian Valot. On the defensive end of the pitch Danny Faundez made his first start of the year in goal earning a clean sheet. To close out April Louisville hosted Hartford were they turned in a dominating performance. Starting with Wynder scoring his second goal of the season in the 5th minute Louisville went on to score six goals with six different players finding the back of the net. Of those six players Adrien Perez, Aiden McFadden, and Tola Showunmi scored their first goals in Louisville Jerseys while Jake Morris contributed two assists. Defensively Las earned his third clean sheet of the season as Louisville won 6–0. Louisville's largest margin of victory in a league game since defeating New York Red Bulls II 6–0 in July 2022. This match also marked Niall McCabe's 200th league appearance for the club. The fourth player in league history to reach that milestone with a single organization.

=== May and June ===
Louisville began May at home against Western Conference side Orange County SC on short rest after playing in the U.S. Open Cup midweek. Harris opened the scoring in the 19th minute for his eighth goal of the year and first in three matches. After the break Serrano scored goal for the second consecutive match with Wilson scoring Louisville's third goal and final goal in the 86th minute. On the defensive side of the ball Las earned a clean sheet as Louisville won 3–0. The first back to back clean sheets of the season. Next, Louisville travelled to play Las Vegas. In this match Louisville scored quickly as Davila found the back of the net after seven minutes. However, Las Vegas responded quickly as Noël levelled the score in the 16th minute. Louisville then fell behind for only the second time this year when former Louisville City original player, Charlie Adams, gave Las Vegas a 2–1 lead. After the half, Danny Cruz made several substitutions including bringing on Serrano who drew Louisville level in the 70th minute. This would be the final goal of the game as Louisville earned a draw for the first time this season. Louisville then travelled to Smithfield for their first ever match against USL expansion side Rhode Island FC in a match where both sides failed to score a single goal with Rhode Island failing to record a shot on target. The scoreless draw ended Serrano's three match scoring streak as well being the first match of the season where Louisville failed to find the back of the net. Louisville closed out May with a mid-week home game against Detroit City FC. In this match Louisville went down first as Matt Sheldon scored off of a rebound in the 34th minute. Only for Louisville to respond with an avalanche of goals. Beginning with Arturo Ordoñez scoring his first goal in a Louisville jersey in the 42nd minute Louisville scored five unanswered goals. Including goals by Morris and Perez and a brace by Harris bringing his goal total to 10 for the season. This was the fourth time Louisville has scored at least 5 goals in a match this season setting a team record.

=== Current roster ===
As of August 15, 2024

Note: Flags indicate national team as defined under FIFA eligibility rules; some limited exceptions apply. Players may hold more than one non-FIFA nationality.

No.	Pos.	Nation	Player
2	DF	USA	Aiden McFadden
3	DF	USA	Jake Morris
4	DF	USA	Sean Totsch
5	DF	ESP	Arturo Ordoñez
6	DF	USA	Wesley Charpie
7	FW	USA	Ray Serrano
8	MF	USA	Carlos Moguel
9	FW	USA	Phillip Goodrum
10	FW	USA	Brian Ownby
11	MF	IRL	Niall McCabe
12	GK	USA	Danny Faundez
13	DF	USA	Amadou Dia
14	FW	USA	Wilson Harris

No.	Pos.	Nation	Player
16	FW	USA	Adrien Perez
17	MF	USA	Taylor Davila
18	GK	USA	Damian Las (on loan from Austin FC)
20	MF	ENG	Sam Gleadle
21	FW	ESP	Jorge Gonzalez
22	MF	USA	Dylan Mares
23	MF	USA	Elijah Wynder
25	MF	USA	Jansen Wilson
27	MF	USA	Evan Davila
30	GK	USA	Ryan Troutman
32	DF	NZL	Kyle Adams
80	DF	USA	Hayden Stamps

USL Academy Contract

=== Out on loan ===
Note: Flags indicate national team as defined under FIFA eligibility rules; some limited exceptions apply. Players may hold more than one non-FIFA nationality.

No.	Pos.	Nation	Player
63	DF	USA	Sebastian Sanchez (on loan to FC Tulsa)
67	DF	USA	Owen Damm (on loan to FC Tulsa)
70	FW	USA	Issac Cano (on loan to Lexington SC)

== Competitions ==
=== Preseason and friendlies ===
February 3	Austin FC	2–2	Louisville City	Austin, Texas
1:00 PM EST	Obrian; Noël 80'	Report	Harris 28'; Ownby 51'	Stadium: Q2 Stadium

February 7	El Paso Locomotive FC	0–2	Louisville City	Tucson, Arizona
11:30 PM EST		Report	Serrano 57'; McCabe 62'	Stadium: Kino Sports Complex; Attendance: 0 (Behind closed doors)

February 11	Sacramento Republic FC	2–3	Louisville City	Tucson, Arizona
2:00 PM EST	López; Jauregui 77'	Report	Perez 19'; Showunmi 70'; Serrano 72'	Stadium: Kino Sports Complex; Attendance: 0 (Behind closed doors)

February 15	St. Louis City SC	1–2	Louisville City	St. Louis, Missouri
12:00 PM EST	Jackson 51'	Report	Wynder 47'; Adams 56'	Stadium: CityPark

February 18	Louisville City	0–0	Lexington SC	Louisville, Kentucky
1:00 PM EST		Report		Stadium: Thurman Hutchins Park; Attendance: 0 (Behind closed doors)

March 2	Louisville City	0–1	Pittsburgh Riverhounds SC	Louisville, Kentucky
1:00 PM EST		Report	54'	Stadium: Thurman Hutchins Park

March 9	Louisville City	2–1	One Knoxville SC	Louisville, Kentucky
4:00 PM EST	Harris	Report		Stadium: Lynn Family Stadium

July 30	Louisville City (United States)	0–4	(Germany) Eintracht Frankfurt	Louisville, Kentucky
8:00 PM EDT		Report	Ekitike 42'; Skhiri 48'; Matanović 50', 80'	Stadium: Lynn Family Stadium; Attendance: 10,218

Sept 10	Louisville City (United States)	4–2	(Mexico) Cancún F.C.	Louisville, Kentucky
7:30 PM EDT	Davila 51'; Perez 61'; Wilson 75'; Harris 87'	Report	Pérez 71', 86'	Stadium: Lynn Family Stadium; Attendance: 5,071
Note: Match originally scheduled for July 13.

=== USL Championship ===
==== Standings — Eastern Conference ====
Pos	Team	Pld	W	L	T	GF	GA	GD	Pts	Qualification
1	Louisville City FC (S)	34	24	6	4	86	43	+43	76	Playoffs
2	Charleston Battery	34	18	6	10	68	35	+33	64	Playoffs
3	Detroit City FC	34	15	8	11	46	32	+14	56	Playoffs
4	Indy Eleven	34	14	11	9	49	50	−1	51	Playoffs
5	Rhode Island FC	34	12	7	15	56	41	+15	51	Playoffs
6	Tampa Bay Rowdies	34	14	12	8	55	46	+9	50	Playoffs
7	Pittsburgh Riverhounds SC	34	12	10	12	41	28	+13	48	Playoffs
8	North Carolina FC	34	13	12	9	54	43	+11	48	Playoffs
9	Birmingham Legion FC	34	13	15	6	44	51	−7	45	
10	Hartford Athletic	34	12	14	8	39	52	−13	44	
11	Loudoun United FC	34	11	14	9	44	39	+5	42	
12	Miami FC	34	3	29	2	26	89	−63	11	

Source: USL Championship Standings
(S) Players' Shield winner

==== Results summary ====
Overall								Home						Away					
Pld	W	D	L	GF	GA	GD	Pts	W	D	L	GF	GA	GD	W	D	L	GF	GA	GD
34	24	4	6	86	43	+43	76	16	0	1	58	21	+37	8	4	5	28	22	+6

Last updated: November 1, 2024.
Source: Match reports

Round	1	2	3	4	5	6	7	8	9	10	11	12	13	14	15	16	17	18	19	20	21	22	23	24	25	26	27	28	29	30	31	32	33	34
Stadium	A	H	H	H	A	A	H	H	A	A	H	A	H	A	A	H	A	A	H	H	A	H	H	A	A	H	A	A	H	H	A	H	A	H
Result	W	W	W	W	L	W	W	W	D	D	W	W	W	L	W	L	W	L	W	W	W	W	W	L	W	W	W	L	W	W	W	W	D	W

Updated to match(es) played on November 1, 2024. Source: Match reports
A = Away; H = Home; W = Win; D = Draw; L = Loss

All times in regular season on Eastern Daylight Time (UTC-04:00) unless otherwise noted

==== Match results ====
March 16 1	El Paso Locomotive FC	0–1	Louisville City	El Paso, Texas
3:00 PM	Alfaro (yellow card) 41'; Dollenmayer (yellow card) 57'	Report	Harris (yellow card) 18', (goal) 57'; Davila (yellow card) 33'; Wilson (yellow card) 36'; Serrano (yellow card) 42'	Stadium: Southwest University Park; Attendance: 4,876; Referee: Abdou Ndiaye; Assistant referees: Stephen McGonagle; Mark Novosel; Fourth official: William Hale

March 23 2	Louisville City	3–1	Pittsburgh Riverhounds SC	Louisville, Kentucky
4:00 PM	Harris 45+5'; Totsh (yellow card) 54', (goal) 65' (pen.); Wynder (yellow card) 88'; Serrano 90+6'	Report	Mertz (yellow card) 48'; Kizza 59'	Stadium: Lynn Family Stadium; Attendance: 9,313; Referee: Elton Garcia; Assistant referees: Zach McWhorter; Jacob Little; Fourth official: Jackson Krauser

March 30 3	Louisville City	5–0	Birmingham Legion FC	Louisville, Kentucky
4:00 PM	Morris 13'; Wilson (yellow card) 17'; Harris 35', 66'; Wynder (yellow card) 68'; Davila (yellow card) 70', (goal) 73'; Serrano 82'	Report	Pasher (yellow card) 61'; Crognale (yellow card) 64'; Paterson (yellow card) 76'; Kavita (yellow card) 78'	Stadium: Lynn Family Stadium; Attendance: 8,973; Referee: Calin Radosav; Assistant referees: Mike Nickerson; Eric Burton; Fourth official: Shawn Westerfield

April 6 4	Louisville City	5–3	Indy Eleven	Louisville, Kentucky
4:00 PM	Harris 16', 62', 71'; Wilson 41'; Wynder 50'; Las (yellow card) 77'; Serrano (yellow card) 87'; Gonzalez (yellow card) 90+6'	Report	Martínez (yellow card) 32'; Blake 34' (pen.), 59'; Boudadi (yellow card) 40'; Oettl (yellow card) 71'; McCabe 82' (o.g.)	Stadium: Lynn Family Stadium; Attendance: 11,330; Referee: Jeremy Scheer; Assistant referees: Matthew Rodman; Tom Felice; Fourth official: Jackson Krauser

April 9 5	Charleston Battery	3–2	Louisville City	Mount Pleasant, South Carolina
7:00 PM	Myers 10'; Markanich 22' (pen.), 30'; Torres (yellow card) 54'; Segbers (yellow card) 89'	Report	Gonzalez 9'; Charpie (yellow card) 45'; Davila 52', (yellow card) 90+8'; Harris (yellow card) 54'; Cruz (yellow card) 75'; Las (yellow card) 84'	Stadium: Patriots Point Soccer Complex; Attendance: 4,465; Referee: Alexis Da Silva; Assistant referees: Jeremy Smith; Rhett Hammil; Fourth official: Josiah Parke

April 20 6	Loudoun United FC	0–1	Louisville City	Leesburg, Virginia
4:00 PM	Valot (yellow card) 45'	Report	Ordoñez (yellow card) 20'; Valot 67' (o.g.); Harris (yellow card) 89'; González (yellow card) 89'	Stadium: Segra Field; Attendance: 2,879; Referee: Alyssa Nichols; Assistant referees: Nicholas Seymour; Joseph Knoff; Fourth official: Gary Gutierrez

April 27 7	Louisville City	6–0	Hartford Athletic	Louisville, Kentucky
7:30 PM	Wynder 5'; Perez 12'; McFadden 32'; Gonzalez 67'; Totsch (yellow card) 81'; Serrano 83'; Showunmi 90+3'	Report	Epps (yellow card) 10'; Buckmaster (yellow card) 37'; Hodge (yellow card) 57'; Asiedu (yellow card) 78'	Stadium: Lynn Family Stadium; Attendance: 10,887; Referee: Ricardo Fierro; Assistant referees: Nicholas Balcer; Chris Schurfranz; Fourth official: Mohamed Sadraoui

May 11 8	Louisville City	3–0	Orange County SC	Louisville, Kentucky
7:30 PM	Harris 19'; Jake Morris (yellow card) 32'; Serrano 68'; Wilson 86'	Report	Iloski (yellow card) 23'; Scott (yellow card) 42'	Stadium: Lynn Family Stadium; Attendance: 10,239; Referee: Eric Tattersall; Assistant referees: Rhett Hammil; Christian Clerc; Fourth official: Noah Matos

May 18 9	Las Vegas Lights FC	2–2	Louisville City	Las Vegas, Nevada
10:30 PM	Noël 16'; Adams 36'; Smart (yellow card) 55'	Report	Davila 7'; Harris (yellow card) 48'; Adams (yellow card) 62'; Serrano 70'	Stadium: Cashman Field; Attendance: 1,048; Referee: Joshua Encarnacion; Assistant referees: Stephen McGonagle; William Aten; Fourth official: Pavel Georgiev

May 25 10	Rhode Island FC	0–0	Louisville City	Smithfield, Rhode Island
4:00 PM	Alves (yellow card) 24'; Smith (yellow card) 50'; Dikwa (yellow card) 55'; Smith (yellow card) 57'; Yao (yellow card) 61'	Report	Totsh (yellow card) 53'; Wynder (yellow card) 90+4'	Stadium: Beirne Stadium; Attendance: 4,914; Referee: Jeremy Scheer; Assistant referees: Mike Nickerson; Eric Del Rosario Gandara; Fourth official: Stearne Briem

May 29 11	Louisville City	5–1	Detroit City FC	Louisville, Kentucky
7:30 PM	Ordoñez (yellow card) 20', (goal) 42'; Wynder (yellow card) 38'; Perez 48', (yellow card) 57'; Harris 61', 84' (pen.); Morris 74'; Cruz (yellow card) 75'	Report	Sheldon 34'; Murphy (yellow card) 40'; Rutz (yellow card) 72'	Stadium: Lynn Family Stadium; Attendance: 10,338; Referee: Matthew Corrigan; Assistant referees: Nicholas Balcer; Christian Little; Fourth official: Mohamed Sadraoui

June 1 12	Miami FC	1–2	Louisville City	Miami, Florida
7:00 PM	Nocerino (yellow card) 17'; Daltyn Knutson (yellow card) 27'; Booth (yellow card) 30'; Cardona (yellow card) 42'; López 61'; Lawrence (yellow card) 71'; Mitrano (yellow card) 81'	Report	Wynder 31'; Perez (yellow card) 38'; Charpie (yellow card) 59'; Totsh 84' (pen.); Las (yellow card) 90+2'	Stadium: Riccardo Silva Stadium; Attendance: 1,098; Referee: Alejo Calume; Assistant referees: Jonathan Smith; Carlos Morales-Lastra; Fourth official: JJ Bilinski

June 8 13	Louisville City	2–1	North Carolina FC	Louisville, Kentucky
8:00 PM	Gleadle 31'; Ordoñez (yellow card) 62'; Totsh 70' (pen.); Wynder (yellow card) 83'	Report	Washington (yellow card) 25'; Conway 90+2'; Batista (yellow card) 90+5'	Stadium: Lynn Family Stadium; Attendance: 9,733; Referee: Abdou Ndiaye; Assistant referees: Matt Trotter; Eric Burton; Fourth official: Matthew Fotia

June 15 14	Tampa Bay Rowdies	3–2	Louisville City	St. Petersburg, Florida
7:30 PM	Pérez (yellow card) 11'; Jennings 30'; Arteaga 36' (pen.); Munjoma (yellow card) 73'; Niyongabire (yellow card) 87'; Rivera 90+2'; Guillén (yellow card) 90+4'; Dennis (yellow card) 90+5'	Report	Gonzalez (yellow card) 25', (goal) 51'; Jake Morris (yellow card) 42'; McFadden 45+5'; Ordoñez (yellow card) 68'; Dia (yellow card) 90+5'	Stadium: Al Lang Stadium; Attendance: 5,393; Referee: Ricardo Fierro; Assistant referees: Ben Rigel; Juan Pablo Casas; Fourth official: Mario Maric

June 19 15	Pittsburgh Riverhounds SC	0–1	Louisville City	Pittsburgh, Pennsylvania
7:30 PM	Luke Biasi (yellow card) 17' (yellow-red card) 76'; Brunallergene Etou (yellow card) 70'	Report	Cruz (yellow card) 45+3'; Ordoñez (yellow card) 45+6'; Wilson 49'; Harris (yellow card) 66'	Stadium: Highmark Stadium; Attendance: 5,084; Referee: Matt Thompson; Assistant referees: Art Arustamyan; Nicholas Seymour; Fourth official: Ali Zolgharnain

June 22 16	Louisville City	2–5	Rhode Island FC	Louisville, Kentucky
8:00 PM	Dia (yellow card) 3'; Cruz (yellow card) 45+2'; Serrano (yellow card) 56'; Mares 85'; Jake Morris 90+5'	Report	Holstad 30'; Kwizera 45+2'; Dikwa (yellow card) 56'; Williams 67'; Lee (yellow card) 84'; Fuson 90+1'; Yao (yellow card) 90+4'; Angking 90+6'	Stadium: Lynn Family Stadium; Attendance: 9,197; Referee: Kyle Johnston; Assistant referees: Mateusz Dulski; Christopher Slane; Fourth official: Josh Braunstein

June 29 17	Birmingham Legion FC	1–4	Louisville City	Birmingham, Alabama
7:30 PM	Tabort Etaka 82'	Report	Charpie (yellow card) 17'; Gonzalez (yellow card) 41'; Ordoñez (yellow card) 45+4'; Gleadle 51'; Harris 58'; Serrano 80'; Showunmi 87'	Stadium: Legion Field; Referee: Joshua Encarnacion; Assistant referees: Nicholas Balcer; Sarah Gaddes; Fourth official: Joshua Belk

July 6 18	Oakland Roots SC	1–0	Louisville City	Hayward, California
10:00 PM	Matsoso (yellow card) 23'; Rodriguez 62'; Chéry (yellow card) 70'; Cedeño (yellow card) 88'; Dwyer (yellow card) 90+3'	Report	Totsch (yellow card) 60'; Davila (yellow card) 68'; Moguel (yellow card) 90+1'	Stadium: Pioneer Stadium; Attendance: 2,631; Referee: Calin Radosav; Assistant referees: CJ Koll; Andrew Hanks; Fourth official: Robert Vincze

July 19 19	Louisville City	2–1	Colorado Springs Switchbacks FC	Louisville, Kentucky
8:00 PM	Wynder (yellow card) 18' (goal) 27'; Dia (yellow card) 36'; Totsch (yellow card) 39' (goal) 90+5'	Report	Foster 16'; Santos (yellow card) 55'; Huerman (yellow card) 66'	Stadium: Lynn Family Stadium; Attendance: 10,418; Referee: Muhammad Hassan; Assistant referees: Jeremy Smith; Chris Schurfranz; Fourth official: Mohamed Sadraoui

July 27 20	Louisville City	4–1	Monterey Bay FC	Louisville, Kentucky
8:00 PM	Morris 3'; Harris 7'; Wynder 28'; Gleadle 81'	Report	Fehr 24'; Martinez (yellow card) 37'	Stadium: Lynn Family Stadium; Attendance: 9,701; Referee: Matthew Corrigan; Assistant referees: Seth Barton; Noah Kenyawani; Fourth official: Noah Matos

August 3 21	New Mexico United	0–1	Louisville City	Albuquerque, New Mexico
9:00 PM	Hurst (yellow card) 63'; Houssou (yellow card) 90+4'	Report	Harris (yellow card) 35'; Wilson 39'	Stadium: Isotopes Park; Attendance: 9,376; Referee: Brandon Stevis; Assistant referees: Darren Bandy; Zach McWhorter; Fourth official: Mario Garcia

August 10 22	Louisville City	4–3	Sacramento Republic FC	Louisville, Kentucky
9:00 PM	Harris 8', 90+4'; Serrano (yellow card) 39'; Davila 46'; Wilson 66'; Dia (yellow card) 69'; McFadden (yellow card) 88'; Adams (yellow card) 90+2'	Report	Fernandes (yellow card) 19'; Portillo (yellow card) 45+2'; Ross 52', 59'; Phillips 55' (yellow card) 67'; Ukaegbu (yellow card) 80'	Stadium: Lynn Family Stadium; Attendance: 8,768; Referee: Sergii Demianchuk; Assistant referees: Nicholas Balcer; Matt Trotter; Fourth official: Christopher Slane

August 17 23	Louisville City	3–1	Charleston Battery	Louisville, Kentucky
8:00 PM	McFadden 17'; Dia (yellow card) 22'; Harris (yellow card) 25'; Wilson 82'; Goodrum 82'	Report	Archer (yellow card) 54'; Segbers (yellow card) 54'; Smith (yellow card) 63', (goal) 90+2'; Chapman (yellow card) 70'	Stadium: Lynn Family Stadium; Attendance: 13,526; Referee: Elton Garcia; Assistant referees: John Krill; Seun Yinka-Kehinde; Fourth official: Salvador Flores

August 24 24	Hartford Athletic	2–1	Louisville City	Hartford, Connecticut
7:00 PM	Burke (yellow card) 45+5'; Dieng 48', 84'; Farrell (yellow card) 69'; Hairston (yellow card) 90+2'	Report	Cruz (yellow card) 25' (yellow-red card) 66'; Perez (red card) 29'; Davila 37'	Stadium: Trinity Health Stadium; Attendance: 5,500; Referee: JC Griggs; Assistant referees: Ricardo Ocampo; Jacob Little; Fourth official: Stearne Briem

August 31 25	North Carolina FC	4–6	Louisville City	Cary, North Carolina
7:30 PM	da Costa 11'; Anderson 29', 56'; Adams 45+3' (o.g.); Craig (yellow card) 58'	Report	Adams (yellow card) 10'; Wilson 18', 29'; Craig 32' (o.g.); Malou 36' (o.g.); Harris 60' (pen.), 69'; Serrano (yellow card) 67'; McFadden (yellow card) 70'	Stadium: WakeMed Soccer Park; Attendance: 2,219; Referee: Lorenzo Hernandez; Assistant referees: Eric Del Rosario Gandara; Aaron Riley; Fourth official: Josiah Parke

September 6 26	Louisville City	1–0	Loudoun United FC	Louisville, Kentucky
7:30 PM	McFadden 52'; Davila (yellow card) 57'; Adams (yellow card) 88'	Report		Stadium: Lynn Family Stadium; Attendance: 8,207; Referee: Ricardo Montero Araya; Assistant referees: Andrew Charron; Jake Brochu; Fourth official: Alexander Adkins
Note: Match was delayed to 8:36 PM due to lightning. A red card was shown to Louisville's Bench.

September 14 27	FC Tulsa	0–1	Louisville City	Tulsa, Oklahoma
8:30 PM	Tetteh (yellow card) 20'; Bourgeois (yellow card) 29'; Souahy (yellow card) 68'; St Clair (yellow card) 71'	Report	Wilson 33'; Wynder (yellow card) 55'; Adams (yellow card) 84'	Stadium: ONEOK Field; Attendance: 2,818; Referee: Brad Jensen; Assistant referees: Clarence Clark; William Aten; Fourth official: Brandon Queri

September 22 28	Detroit City FC	2–1	Louisville City	Hamtramck, Michigan
3:00 PM	Rodriguez 17', (yellow card) 62'; Rh. Williams (yellow card) 37'; Rutz 67'	Report	Goodrum (yellow card) 33' (yellow-red card) 49'; Totsch 45+5' (pen.); Perez (yellow card) 51'; Ordoñez (yellow card) 73'	Stadium: Keyworth Stadium; Referee: Ricardo Fierro; Assistant referees: Brian Marshall; Eric Burton; Fourth official: Atahan Yaya

September 28 29	Louisville City	4–2	Memphis 901 FC	Louisville, Kentucky
7:30 PM	Harris 25'; Davila 40', 55'; Wynder 45+6'; Adams (yellow card) 60'; Gleadle (yellow card) 79'	Report	Lapa 14', 18'; Fernando (yellow card) 53'; Jimenez (yellow card) 80'; Turci (yellow card) 81'; Cissoko (yellow card) 90+2'	Stadium: Lynn Family Stadium; Attendance: 6,197; Referee: Nabil Bensalah; Assistant referees: James Duling; Stephen Milhoan; Fourth official: Christopher Slane

October 2 30	Louisville City	3–0	Miami FC	Louisville, Kentucky
7:30 PM	Totsh 11'; Serrano (yellow card) 19', (goal) 83'; Wynder (yellow card) 26'; Goodrum 73'	Report	Joseph (yellow card) 57'	Stadium: Lynn Family Stadium; Attendance: 8,020; Referee: Thomas Snyder; Assistant referees: Matt Trotter; Eric Del Rosario Gandara; Fourth official: Jackson Krauser

October 5 31	Indy Eleven	2–2	Louisville City	Indianapolis, Indiana
7:00 PM	Quinn (yellow card) 4'; Foster (yellow card) 20'; Williams 45+3', 68'	Report	Dia 12'; McFadden (yellow card) 29'; Cruz (yellow card) 30'; Serrano (yellow card) 44'; Adams (yellow card) 85'; Morris 90+4'	Stadium: Carroll Stadium; Attendance: 10,780; Referee: Alyssa Nichols; Assistant referees: Chris Schurfranz; Justin Mack; Fourth official: Braeden Frey

October 12 32	Louisville City	2–1	Tampa Bay Rowdies	Louisville, Kentucky
7:30 PM	Totsh 71' (pen.); Goodrum (yellow card) 73'; Ordoñez 90+6'	Report	Hilton (yellow card) 20', (goal) 61'; Niyongabire (yellow card) 68'; Arteaga (yellow card) 69'; Neilson (red card) 69'; Fernandes (yellow card) 90+4'	Stadium: Lynn Family Stadium; Attendance: 9,940; Referee: Elijio Arreguin; Assistant referees: John Krill; Tom Felice; Fourth official: Benjamin Meyer

October 19 33	San Antonio FC	1–1	Louisville City	San Antonio, Texas
8:30 PM	Haakenson (yellow card) 34'; Hernandez (yellow card) 61'; Lambert 61'; Marcina (yellow card) 62'; Djeffal (yellow card) 64'	Report	Totsh (yellow card) 3'; Goodrum 45+2'; McFadden (yellow card) 90+4'	Stadium: Toyota Field; Attendance: 7,199; Referee: Abdou Ndiaye; Assistant referees: Clarence Clark; Joseph Jeffers; Fourth official: Collins Gitau

October 26 34	Louisville City	4–1	Phoenix Rising FC	Louisville, Kentucky
7:30 PM	Harris 24', 28'; Serrano 66'; Goodrum 90+2'	Report	Margaritha 8'; Fuenmayor (yellow card) 81'	Stadium: Lynn Family Stadium; Attendance: 10,187; Referee: Jeremy Scheer; Assistant referees: Art Arustamyan; Nicholas Seymour; Fourth official: Alexander Adkins

==== USL Cup Playoffs ====
The top eight teams in each USL Championship conference advanced to the 2023 USL Championship Playoffs. Louisville City entered the playoffs as the first seed out of the Eastern Conference.

Conference Quarterfinals; November 1–3	Conference Semifinals; November 9–10
E1	Louisville City FC	3
E8	North Carolina FC	2
E1	Louisville City FC	0
E5	Rhode Island FC	3
E4	Indy Eleven	2
E5	Rhode Island FC	3
Eastern Conference
E3	Detroit City FC	1 (1)
E6	Tampa Bay Rowdies (p)	1 (3)
E6	Tampa Bay Rowdies	1
E2	Charleston Battery	2
E2	Charleston Battery	1
E7	Pittsburgh Riverhounds SC	0
W1	New Mexico United	2
W8	Phoenix Rising FC	1
W1	New Mexico United	0
W4	Las Vegas Lights FC	1
W4	Las Vegas Lights FC (p)	0 (3)
W5	Sacramento Republic FC	0 (2)
Western Conference
W3	Memphis 901 FC	0
W6	Orange County SC (a.e.t.)	1
W6	Orange County SC	1
W2	Colorado Springs Switchbacks FC (a.e.t.)	2
W2	Colorado Springs Switchbacks FC	2
W7	Oakland Roots SC	0

Conference Finals; November 16
E5	Rhode Island FC	2
E2	Charleston Battery	1
W4	Las Vegas Lights FC	0
W2	Colorado Springs Switchbacks FC	1

USL Championship Final; November 23
E5	Rhode Island FC	0
W2	Colorado Springs Switchbacks FC	3

November 2, 2024 Conference Quarter-finals	Louisville City FC	3–2	North Carolina FC	Louisville, Kentucky
7:30 PM EDT	Dia 20'; Davila 24'; Perez 54'; Charpie (yellow card) 90+3'; Adams (yellow card) 90+4'	Report	Anderson 11'; Batista (yellow card) 59'; Washington 90+4'	Stadium: Lynn Family Stadium; Attendance: 8,875; Referee: Matthew Corrigan; Assistant referees: Matthew Rodman; Rhett Hammil; Fourth official: Kyle Johnston

November 9, 2024 Conference Semi-finals	Louisville City FC	0-3	Rhode Island FC	Louisville, Kentucky
7:30 PM EST		Report	J.J Williams 9'; Frank Nodarse (yellow card) 11'; J.J Williams 78'; Clay Holstad (yellow card) 72'; Albert Dikwa 90+2'; Karifa Yao (yellow card) 90+7'	Stadium: Lynn Family Stadium; Attendance: 9,510; Referee: Elton Garcia; Assistant referees: Nicholas Balcer; Ricardo Ocampo; Fourth official: Abdou Ndiaye

=== U.S. Open Cup ===
As a member of the USL Championship that finished outside the top eight teams in the 2023 season, Louisville City entered the tournament in the Third Round, with their Cup opener played on April 16, 2024. Louisville City's third round draw is against Greenville Triumph SC from USL League One.

April 16 Third	Louisville City (Kentucky)	3–1	(South Carolina) Greenville Triumph SC	Louisville, Kentucky
7:00 PM EST	Totsch 2'; Harris 49', (yellow card) 50'; Dia (yellow card) 89'; González 90+7'	Report	Zakowski (yellow card) 60'; Herrera (yellow card) 70'; Castro (yellow card) 73'; Anderson 90+3'	Stadium: Lynn Family Stadium; Attendance: 4,373; Referee: Izlen Peksenar

May 8 Round of 32	Seattle Sounders FC (Washington (state))	2–2 (a.e.t.) (5–4 p)	(Kentucky) Louisville City	Tukwila, Washington
10:30 PM EST	Rothrock 41'; Musovski 62'	Report	Charpie (yellow card) 61'; Totsch 67' (pen.); Dia (yellow card) 78'; Gonzalez 89'; Adams (yellow card) 90'	Stadium: Starfire Sports Complex; Referee: Ricardo Ocampo
	Penalties
	Musovski (penalty missed); Leyva (penalty scored); Lopez (penalty scored); Léo Chú (penalty missed); Brunell (penalty scored); De Rosario (penalty missed); Kossa-Rienzi (penalty scored); Thomas (penalty scored)		(penalty missed) Totsch; (penalty missed) Wynder; (penalty scored) Ordoñez; (penalty scored) Davila; (penalty scored) McCabe; (penalty missed) Gleadle; (penalty scored) Wilson; (penalty missed) Adams

== Player statistics ==
=== Goals ===
Place	Pos.	No.	Name	USL	USOC	USL Playoffs	Total
1	FW	14	(United States) Wilson Harris	19	1	0	20
2	MF	25	(United States) Jansen Wilson	9	0	0	9
2	DF	4	(United States) Sean Totsch	7	2	0	9
4	MF	7	(United States) Ray Serrano	8	0	0	8
6	MF	17	(United States) Taylor Davila	7	0	0	7
6	MF	23	(United States) Elijah Wynder	6	0	0	6
7	DF	3	(United States) Jake Morris	5	0	0	5
7	FW	9	(Spain) Jorge Gonzalez	3	2	0	5
9	DF	2	(United States) Aiden McFadden	4	0	0	4
9	FW	9	(United States) Phillip Goodrum	4	0	0	4
11	MF	20	(England) Sam Gleadle	3	0	0	3
12	FW	16	(United States) Adrien Perez	2	0	0	2
12	FW	24	(England) Tola Showunmi	2	0	0	2
12	DF	5	(Spain) Arturo Ordoñez	2	0	0	2
15	MF	22	(United States) Dylan Mares	1	0	0	1
15	DF	13	(United States) Amadou Dia	1	0	0	1
Total				83	5	0	88

=== Assists ===
Place	Pos.	No.	Name	USL	USOC	USL Playoffs	Total
1	FW	16	(United States) Adrien Perez	7	0	0	7
1	DF	3	(United States) Jake Morris	7	0	0	7
3	MF	17	(United States) Taylor Davila	6	0	0	6
3	DF	2	(United States) Aiden McFadden	6	0	0	6
5	MF	7	(United States) Ray Serrano	5	0	0	5
6	DF	32	(New Zealand) Kyle Adams	4	0	0	4
6	MF	20	(England) Sam Gleadle	3	1	0	4
8	FW	9	(Spain) Jorge Gonzalez	3	0	0	3
8	DF	4	(United States) Sean Totsch	3	0	0	3
10	FW	14	(United States) Wilson Harris	2	0	0	2
10	MF	22	(United States) Dylan Mares	2	0	0	2
10	MF	11	(Republic of Ireland) Niall McCabe	1	1	0	2
13	MF	27	(United States) Evan Davila	1	0	0	1
13	MF	8	(United States) Carlos Moguel	1	0	0	1
13	DF	5	(Spain) Arturo Ordoñez	1	0	0	1
13	MF	23	(United States) Elijah Wynder	1	0	0	1
13	DF	13	(United States) Amadou Dia	1	0	0	1
13	MF	25	(United States) Jansen Wilson	0	1	0	1
13	DF	6	(United States) Wesley Charpie	0	1	0	1
Total				54	4	0	58

=== Clean sheets ===
Place	Pos.	No.	Name	USL	USOC	USL Playoffs	Total
1	GK	18	(United States) Damian Las	9	0	0	9
2	GK	12	(United States) Danny Faundez	1	0	0	1
2	GK	30	(United States) Ryan Troutman	1	0	0	1
Total				11	0	0	11

=== Disciplinary ===
No.	Pos.	Name	USL		U.S. Open Cup		USL Cup		Total	
No.	Pos.	Name	Booked	Sent off (straight red)	Booked	Sent off (straight red)	Booked	Sent off (straight red)	Booked	Sent off (straight red)
16	FW	(United States) Adrien Perez	2	1	0	0	0	0	2	1
9	FW	(United States) Phillip Goodrum	1	1	0	0	0	0	1	1
23	MF	(United States) Elijah Wynder	8	0	0	0	0	0	8	0
32	DF	(New Zealand) Kyle Adams	7	0	1	0	0	0	8	0
7	FW	(United States) Ray Serrano	7	0	0	0	0	0	7	0
14	FW	(United States) Wilson Harris	6	0	1	0	0	0	7	0
13	DF	(United States) Amadou Dia	5	0	2	0	0	0	7	0
4	DF	(United States) Sean Totsch	6	0	0	0	0	0	6	0
5	DF	(Spain) Arturo Ordoñez	5	0	0	0	0	0	5	0
17	MF	(United States) Taylor Davila	5	0	0	0	0	0	5	0
9	FW	(Spain) Jorge Gonzalez	4	0	0	0	0	0	4	0
2	DF	(United States) Aiden McFadden	4	0	0	0	0	0	4	0
6	DF	(United States) Wesley Charpie	3	0	1	0	0	0	4	0
18	GK	(United States) Damian Las	3	0	0	0	0	0	3	0
25	MF	(United States) Jansen Wilson	2	0	0	0	0	0	2	0
3	DF	(United States) Jake Morris	2	0	0	0	0	0	2	0
3	MF	(United States) Carlos Moguel	1	0	0	0	0	0	1	0
5	DF	(Spain) Arturo Ordoñez	1	0	0	0	0	0	1	0
20	MF	(England) Sam Gleadle	1	0	0	0	0	0	1	0
15	DF	(United States) Manny Perez	1	0	0	0	0	0	1	0
Total			74	2	5	0	0	0	79	2
