= 2025 Louisville City FC season =

Season of a professional football team

Louisville City FC
2025 season
- Owner: John Neace
- Manager: Danny Cruz
- Stadium: Lynn Family Stadium
- USLC: Eastern Conference: 1st Overall: 1st
- U.S. Open Cup: Round of 32
- USL Championship Playoffs: Conference Quarter-Finals
- USL Cup: Group stage
- Highest home attendance: 13,611 (August 9, against Charleston)
- Lowest home attendance: League: 8,147 (June 7, against Tampa Bay); Overall: 2,642 (April 15, against Loudoun)
- Average home league attendance: 9,540
Home colors	Away colors	Third colors

The 2025 Louisville City FC season was the club's eleventh season of competition. Louisville City competes in the USL Championship, the second tier of professional soccer in the United States.

During the season, Louisville had one of the most dominant performances in USL Championship history, winning their second in a row Players Shield with 73 points, averaging a historical 2.43 points per game and losing only once. However, in the playoffs, Louisville was stunned by eighth-seeded Detroit City FC at home to continue Louisville's league championship drought at seven years.

== Background ==
Louisville entered the 2025 season following a successful season that ended with playoff disappointment. The club won the 2024 USL Championship Player's Shield after having the best record in the league. However, in the second round of the 2024 USL Championship playoffs, Louisville was stunned at home by fifth-seeded expansion club Rhode Island FC in a 3–0 defeat.

== Roster ==
=== Current roster ===
As of May 27, 2025

Note: Flags indicate national team as defined under FIFA eligibility rules; some limited exceptions apply. Players may hold more than one non-FIFA nationality.

No.	Pos.	Nation	Player
1	GK	USA	Damian Las (on loan from Austin FC)
2	DF	USA	Aiden McFadden
3	DF	USA	Jake Morris
4	DF	USA	Sean Totsch
5	DF	ESP	Arturo Ordoñez
6	MF	AUS	Zach Duncan
7	FW	USA	Ray Serrano
8	MF	USA	Carlos Moguel Jr.
9	FW	USA	Phillip Goodrum
10	FW	USA	Brian Ownby
11	MF	IRL	Niall McCabe
12	GK	USA	Danny Faundez
13	DF	USA	Amadou Dia
15	DF	USA	Manny Perez

No.	Pos.	Nation	Player
16	FW	USA	Adrien Perez
17	MF	USA	Taylor Davila
21	FW	ESP	Jorge Gonzalez
23	MF	ENG	Sam Gleadle
24	DF	USA	Josh Jones
25	MF	USA	Jansen Wilson
27	MF	USA	Evan Davila
30	GK	USA	Ryan Troutman
31	MF	JAM	Kevon Lambert (on loan from Real Salt Lake)
32	DF	NZL	Kyle Adams
70	FW	USA	Issac Cano
80	DF	USA	Hayden Stamps
—	FW	ENG	Cameron Lancaster (on loan from Lexington SC)

USL Academy Contract

== Competitions ==
=== USL Championship ===
==== Standings — Eastern Conference ====
Pos	Team	Pld	W	L	T	GF	GA	GD	Pts	Qualification
1	Louisville City FC (S)	30	22	1	7	56	19	+37	73	Playoffs
2	Charleston Battery	30	19	6	5	62	32	+30	62	Playoffs
3	North Carolina FC	30	13	11	6	40	39	+1	45	Playoffs
4	Pittsburgh Riverhounds SC (C)	30	12	10	8	32	28	+4	44 (Note: Pittsburgh Riverhounds SC are ahead of Hartford Athletic on head-to-head points. PGH 6, HFD 0.)	Playoffs
5	Hartford Athletic	30	13	12	5	48	36	+12	44	Playoffs

Source: USL Championship Standings
(C) Champions; (S) Players' Shield winner

==== Results summary ====
On December 19, 2024, the USL Championship released the regular season schedule for all 24 teams.

All times in regular season on Eastern Daylight Time (UTC-04:00) unless otherwise noted

==== Match results ====
March 8 1	Charleston Battery	1–2	Louisville City FC	Mount Pleasant, SC
	Torres 63'; Rodriguez (red card) 70'	Report	Lopez 53'; Perez 76'	Stadium: Patriots Point Soccer Complex; Attendance: 3,438; Referee: Abdou Ndiaye

March 16 2	Birmingham Legion FC	1–1	Louisville City FC	Birmingham, Alabama
9:00 PM	Martínez (yellow card) 10'; Torres (yellow card) 40'; Damus 47'; Hamouda (yellow card) 53'	Report	M. Perez 30'; A. Perez (yellow card) 40'; Duncan (yellow card) 47'	Stadium: Protective Stadium; Attendance: 3,724; Referee: Kyle Johnston

March 22 3	Louisville City FC	2–0	Loudoun United FC	Louisville, Kentucky
4:00 PM	Lopez 26'; Davila 76'	Report		Stadium: Lynn Family Stadium; Attendance: 9,673; Referee: Atahan Yaya

March 29 4	Louisville City FC	2–0	Detroit City FC	Louisville, KY
4:00 PM	Serrano 20'; Goodrum (yellow card) 41'; Duncan (yellow card) 50'; Davila (yellow card) 67'; Wilson 77'; Lambert (red card) 84'	Report	Rh. Williams (yellow card) 37'	Stadium: Lynn Family Stadium; Attendance: 9,004; Referee: Ekaterina Koroleva

April 5 5	Sacramento Republic FC	1–1	Louisville City FC	Sacramento, California
10:00 PM	Parano 69'	Report	Dia 90'+8'	Stadium: Heart Health Park; Attendance: 9,880; Referee: Matthew Corrigan

April 19 6	Tampa Bay Rowdies	1–2	Louisville City FC	St. Petersburg, Florida
	Bassett 58'	Report	Davila 69'; Gleadle 74'	Stadium: Al Lang Stadium; Attendance: 6,263; Referee: Elijio Arreguin

May 1 7	Louisville City FC	2–0	Lexington SC	Louisville, Kentucky
7:00 PM	Adams (yellow card) 50'; McFadden (yellow card) 52'; Gibert 67' (o.g.); Goodrum 81'	Report	Ajago (red card) 50'; Sargeant (yellow card) 55'	Stadium: Lynn Family Stadium; Attendance: 8,233; Referee: Jeremy Scheer

May 10 8	Louisville City FC	0–0	Pittsburgh Riverhounds SC	Louisville, Kentucky
		Report		Stadium: Lynn Family Stadium; Attendance: 9,903; Referee: Matthew Thompson

May 17 9	Hartford Athletic	1-1	Louisville City FC	Hartford, Connecticut
	Edwards 88'	Report	Goodrum 39'	Stadium: Trinity Health Stadium; Attendance: 4,749; Referee: John Griggs

May 24 10	Monterey Bay FC	0–2	Louisville City FC	Seaside, California
9:00 PM		Report	Totsch 20'; Perez 49'	Stadium: Cardinale Stadium; Attendance: 3,002; Referee: Alyssa Nichols

June 7 11	Louisville City FC	2–1	Tampa Bay Rowdies	Louisville, Kentucky
	Goodrum 7'; Serrano 16'	Report	Pacius 31'	Stadium: Lynn Family Stadium; Attendance: 8,147; Referee: Trevor Wiseman

June 11 12	Louisville City FC	2–1	Rhode Island FC	Louisville, KY
7:00PM	Davila (yellow card) 17'; McFadden 20'; Totsch (yellow card) 56'; Serrano 63'	Report	Nodarse (yellow card) 5'; Adams 27' (o.g.); Kwizera (yellow card) 71' (yellow-red card) 90+5'; Fuson (yellow card) 90'	Stadium: Lynn Family Stadium; Attendance: 9,183; Referee: Elton García

June 14 12	Louisville City FC	4–2	Birmingham Legion FC	Louisville, Kentucky
7:00 PM	Dia 29'; Goodrum 30', 44', 5'	Report	Damus 15'; Moguel Jr. 90' (o.g.)	Stadium: Lynn Family Stadium; Attendance: 8,802; Referee: Mark Verso

June 20 13	North Carolina FC	2–1	Louisville City FC	Cary, North Carolina
7:00 PM	Sundstrom 45'; Luckhurst 66'	Report	Goodrum 48'	Stadium: WakeMed Soccer Park; Attendance: 2,479; Referee: Brad Jensen

June 25 15	Loudoun United FC	1–4	Louisville City FC	Leesburg, Virginia
6:00 PM EDT	Aboukoura 32' (Pen.); Leerman (red card) 45'+1'	Report	Moguel 25'; McCabe 57' (o.g.); Wilson 78'; Lopez 90'+1'	Stadium: Segra Field; Attendance: 583; Referee: Joshua Encarnación

July 4 16	Colorado Springs Switchbacks FC	0–1	Louisville City FC	Colorado Springs, Colorado
8:00 PM		Report	Goodrum 9'	Stadium: Weidner Field; Attendance: 7,248; Referee: Brandon Stevis

July 19 17	Louisville City FC	1–1	FC Tulsa	Louisville, KY
7:00 PM	Lancaster 90'+2'	Report	ElMedkhar 90'+5'	Stadium: Lynn Family Stadium; Attendance: 8,859; Referee: Luis Arroyo

August 2 18	Louisville City FC	4–1	North Carolina FC	Louisville, KY
7:00 PM	Lambert 5'; Goodrum 50'; Wilson 62'; Davila 88'		Anderson 18'	Stadium: Lynn Family Stadium; Attendance: 9,756; Referee: Gerald Flores

August 9 19	Louisville City FC	4–1	Charleston Battery	Louisville, KY
7:00 PM	Goodrum 3'; Wilson 16', 28'; Davila 45'+6' (pen.)	Report	Myers 52'	Stadium: Lynn Family Stadium; Attendance: 13,611; Referee: Elijio Arreguin

August 16 20	Miami FC	2–4	Louisville City FC	Miami, Florida
6:30 PM	Melano 22'; Knutson 25'	Report	Goodrum 12', 23'; McFadden 63'; Wilson 80'	Stadium: Pitbull Stadium; Attendance: 1,233; Referee: Rodrigo Albuquerque

August 23 21	Louisville City FC	0−0	New Mexico United	Louisville, KY
7:00 PM		Report		Stadium: Lynn Family Stadium; Attendance: 10,719; Referee: Brandon Stevis

August 30 22	Indy Eleven	1–3	Louisville City FC	Indianapolis, IN
7:00 PM	Williams 2'; Foster (yellow card) 74'	Report	McFadden 45'; Lambert 49', (yellow card) 65'; Totsch 56'	Stadium: Carroll Stadium; Attendance: 10,230; Referee: Greg Dopka

September 6 23	Rhode Island FC	0−1	Louisville City FC	Pawtucket, RI
7:00 PM	Ybarra (yellow card) 31'; Holstad (yellow card) 68'; Yao (yellow card) 71'; Williams (yellow card) 89'; Bacharach (yellow card) 90+1'	Report	McFadden 18'	Stadium: Centreville Bank Stadium; Attendance: 10,534; Referee: Benjamin Meyer

September 13 24	Pittsburgh Riverhounds SC	0–2	Louisville City FC	Pittsburgh, Pennsylvania
7:00 PM		Report	Lambert 50'; Perez 87'	Stadium: Highmark Stadium; Attendance: 5,152; Referee: Elvis Osmanovic

September 20 25	Louisville City FC	3–1	Las Vegas Lights FC	Louisville, KY
7:00 PM	Gleadle 6'; Perez 67'; Jones 84'	Report	McNamara (red card) 30'; Rodriguez 39'	Stadium: Lynn Family Stadium; Attendance: 10,825; Referee: Natalie Simon

September 27 26	Detroit City FC	0–1	Louisville City FC	Hamtramck, MI
7:00 PM		Report	Totsch 6'	Stadium: Keyworth Stadium; Attendance: 6,269; Referee: Elton García

October 4 27	Louisville City FC	2–0	Indy Eleven	Louisville, KY
7:00 PM	Dia 36'; Davila 58'; Perez (yellow card) 63'; Las (red card) 72'	Report		Stadium: Lynn Family Stadium; Attendance: 9,785; Referee: Servando Berna Rico

October 11 28	Louisville City FC	1–0	Miami FC	Louisville, KY
7:30 PM	Ownby 88'	Report		Stadium: Lynn Family Stadium; Attendance: 10,237; Referee: Amin Hadzic

October 18 29	Orange County SC	0–0	Louisville City FC	Irvine, California
10:00 PM		Report		Stadium: Championship Soccer Stadium; Attendance: 5,000; Referee: Matthew Corrigan

October 25 30	Louisville City FC	1–0	Hartford Athletic	Louisville, KY
7:30 PM	Goodrum 39'	Report		Stadium: Lynn Family Stadium; Attendance: 9,527; Referee: Atahan Yaya

==== USL Championship playoffs ====
As the first seed in the Eastern Conference and the overall best record in the league, Louisville clinched a home playoff spot for the entire playoffs. In the Eastern Conference quarterfinals, Louisville was matched up against eight-seeded Detroit City FC, ultimately losing 1–0 at home.

November 1, 2025 East	Louisville City FC	0–1	Detroit City FC	Louisville, Kentucky
7:00 PM ET		Report	Amoo-Mensah 34'	Stadium: Lynn Family Stadium; Attendance: 8,210; Referee: Greg Dopka

=== USL Cup ===
Louisville City participated in the second edition of the USL Cup, the first edition to feature teams from both the USL Championship and League One.

==== Standings ====
Pos	Lg	Team	Pld	W	PKW	PKL	L	GF	GA	GD	Pts	Qualification
1	USLC	Loudoun United FC	4	2	1	1	0	5	3	+2	9	Advance to knockout stage
2	USL1	Charlotte Independence	4	2	1	1	0	8	4	+4	9	
3	USLC	Louisville City FC	4	3	0	0	1	8	4	+4	9	
4	USLC	Lexington SC	4	1	0	1	2	6	5	+1	4	
5	USLC	North Carolina FC	4	1	1	0	2	3	4	−1	5	

Updated to match(es) played on July 26, 2025. Source: USL

==== Group stage ====
April 26, 2025	Louisville City FC	4–1	Richmond Kickers	Louisville, Kentucky
7:30 PM EDT	M. Perez 45+3'; Serrano 55'; Gleadle 62'; A. Perez 87'	Report	Seufert 58'	Stadium: Lynn Family Stadium; Attendance: 8,922; Referee: Drew Klemp

May 31, 2025	Loudoun United FC	2–1	Louisville City FC	Leesburg, Virginia
6:00 PM EDT	Aboukoura 14'; Ryan 59'	Report	Pérez 20'	Stadium: Segra Field; Attendance: 1,583; Referee: Thomas Snyder

June 29, 2025	Louisville City FC	1–0	North Carolina FC	Louisville, Kentucky
8:00 PM EDT	Wilson 10'	Report		Stadium: Lynn Family Stadium; Attendance: 7,002; Referee: Jeremy Scheer
Note: Match moved from June 28 to June 29 to accommodate travel issues experienced by North Carolina FC.

July 26	Lexington SC	1–2	Louisville City FC	Lexington, Kentucky
7:00 PM EDT	Greene 87'	Report	Morris 90+1', 90+7'	Stadium: Lexington SC Stadium; Attendance: 8,252; Referee: Corbyn May

=== U.S. Open Cup ===
Louisville City, as a member of the second division USL Championship, entered the U.S. Open Cup in the Third Round based on their performance in the 2024 USL Championship season.

April 15, 2025 Third Round	Louisville City FC (USLC) (Kentucky)	2–1	(Virginia) Loudoun United FC (USLC)	Louisville, Kentucky
7:00 p.m. EDT	Perez 18'; Gleadle 28'	Report	Aboukoura 90'	Stadium: Lynn Family Stadium; Attendance: 2,642; Referee: Elivis Osmanovic

May 7, 2025 Round of 32	Louisville City FC (Kentucky)	0–1	Minnesota United FC	Louisville, Kentucky
7:30 p.m. EDT		Report	Randell 65'	Stadium: Lynn Family Stadium; Attendance: 4,482; Referee: Muhammad Kaleia
