= List of Louisville City FC seasons =

Since its founding in 2015, the American soccer club Louisville City FC has competed in the USL Championship, the second division of American soccer, previously known as USL and USL Pro. The following is a complete list of club seasons, including team and individual statistics for all competitive competitions that Louisville City has partaken in.

== Key ==
Key to competitions

- USL Championship (USLC) – The second division of soccer in the United States, established in 2010 and previously known as USL and USL Pro. The Championship was the third division of American soccer from its founding until its elevation to second division status in 2017.
- U.S. Open Cup (USOC) – The premier knockout cup competition in US soccer, first contested in 1914.
- CONCACAF Champions League (CCL) – The premier competition in North American soccer since 1962. It went by the name of Champions' Cup until 2008.

Key to colors and symbols

1st or W	Winners
2nd or RU	Runners-up
Last	Wooden Spoon
♦	League Golden Boot
	Highest average attendance

Key to league record

- Season = The year and article of the season
- Div = Level on pyramid
- League = League name
- Pld = Games played
- W = Games won
- L = Games lost
- D = Games drawn
- GF = Goals scored
- GA = Goals against
- Pts = Points
- PPG = Points per game
- Conf = Conference position
- Overall = League position

Key to cup record

- DNE = Did not enter
- DNQ = Did not qualify
- NH = Competition not held or canceled
- QR = Qualifying round
- PR = Preliminary round
- GS = Group stage
- R1 = First round
- R2 = Second round
- R3 = Third round
- R4 = Fourth round
- R5 = Fifth round
- QF = Quarterfinals
- SF = Semifinals
- RU = Runners-up
- W = Winners

== Seasons ==
Season	League											Position		Playoffs	USOC	Continental / Other	Average attendance	Top goalscorer(s)	
Season	Div	League	Pld	W	L	D	GF	GA	GD	Pts	PPG	Conf.	Overall	Playoffs	USOC	Continental / Other	Average attendance	Name	Goals
2015	3	USL	28	14	8	6	55	34	+21	48	1.71	2nd	2nd	SF	R4	Ineligible	6,765	(United States) Matthew Fondy	24
2016	3	USL	30	17	4	9	52	27	+25	60	2.00	2nd	2nd	SF	R3	DNQ	7,218	(United States) Chandler Hoffman	16
2017	2	USL	32	18	6	8	58	31	+27	62	1.94	1st	2nd	W	R3	DNQ	8,601	(United States) Luke Spencer	11
2018	2	USL	34	19	6	9	71	38	+33	66	1.94	2nd	3rd	W	QF	DNQ	7,888	(England) Cameron Lancaster	28
2019	2	USLC	34	17	8	9	58	41	+17	60	1.76	4th	6th	RU	R4	DNQ	9,041	(Denmark) Magnus Rasmussen	16
2020	2	USLC	16	11	3	2	28	12	+16	35	2.19	1st	3rd	SF	NH	DNQ	4,859	(England) Cameron Lancaster	12
2021	2	USLC	32	18	7	7	61	37	+24	61	1.91	2nd	4th	SF	NH	DNQ	10,088	(England) Cameron Lancaster	21
2022	2	USLC	34	22	6	6	65	28	+37	72	2.12	1st	2nd	RU	R5	DNQ	10,465	(United States) Wilson Harris	17
2023	2	USLC	34	14	12	8	41	55	-3	50	1.47	5th	10th	SF	R3	DNQ	10,549	(England) Cameron Lancaster	11
2024	2	USLC	34	24	6	4	86	43	+43	76	1.24	1st	1st	SF	Ro32	DNQ	9,707	(United States) Wilson Harris	20
2025	2	USLC	30	22	1	7	56	19	+37	73	2.43	1st	1st	QF	Ro32	DNQ	9,655	(United States) Phillip Goodrum	13
Total	–	–	338	196	67	75	631	365	+266	663	1.92	–	–	–	–	–	–	(England) Cameron Lancaster	90

1. Avg. attendance only includes statistics from regular season matches.
2. Top goalscorer(s) includes all goals scored in the regular season, league playoffs, U.S. Open Cup, CONCACAF Champions League, FIFA Club World Cup, and other competitive continental matches.
