= Louisville City FC =

American professional soccer club

Louisville City
- Full name: Louisville City Football Club
- Nicknames: LouCity; The Boys in Purple; Los Morados
- Founded: June 4, 2014; 12 years ago
- Stadium: Lynn Family Stadium; Louisville, Kentucky
- Capacity: 15,304
- Owner(s): Soccer Holdings, LLC
- Chairman: John Neace
- Head Coach: Simon Bird (interim)
- League: USL Championship
- 2025: 1st, Eastern Conference; Playoffs: eliminated on quarterfinals
- Website: loucity.com
Home colors	Away colors

Louisville City Football Club is an American professional soccer club based in Louisville, Kentucky. The team plays in the USL Championship, which is currently the second tier of the American soccer pyramid.

The club was founded in 2014 after Orlando City's USL team franchise rights were relocated to Louisville and played their first USL season in 2015. After reaching the Eastern Conference finals of the USL playoffs in both its first two seasons, the club went on to win the 2017 USL Cup in only its third season of existence. In 2018, they repeated as champions, becoming the first team to win back-to-back USL Cup championships. In 2019, they became the first team in USL history to play in three consecutive USL Cup Finals, but lost against Real Monarchs 1–3.

== History ==
In early 2014, the owners of Orlando City's USL team, encouraged by minority owner Wayne Estopinal, met with city of Louisville officials to explore moving the team that would be displaced by Orlando's new MLS franchise. Estopinal became the majority owner and the club formally announced their relocation to Louisville in June 2014. Orlando City SC held a minority ownership stake in Louisville City FC during the latter's inaugural campaign in 2015, and Louisville City featured as the Lions' USL affiliate team.

The club maintained the colors of the Orlando City franchise, and installed former Orlando City player-coach James O'Connor as its first manager.

In their first season in 2015, the club finished second in the league in points. In the playoffs they made it to the Eastern Conference finals before falling 1–0 to eventual league champions Rochester Rhinos. The team won two matches in the 2015 US Open Cup but lost in the fourth round to the Chicago Fire of the MLS in extra time.

Beginning with the 2016 season, Orlando City SC ended its affiliation with Louisville City and began operating the Orlando City B USL team.

In 2016, Louisville City placed second overall in the league for the second consecutive season, and they also finished their season losing in the Eastern Conference Finals, this time on penalties to the MLS affiliate and eventual league champions New York Red Bulls II. This marked the second season in a row that Louisville fell to the eventual league champions in the conference finals. In the 2016 US Open Cup, the team only won one match before losing in the third round to Indy Eleven of the NASL.

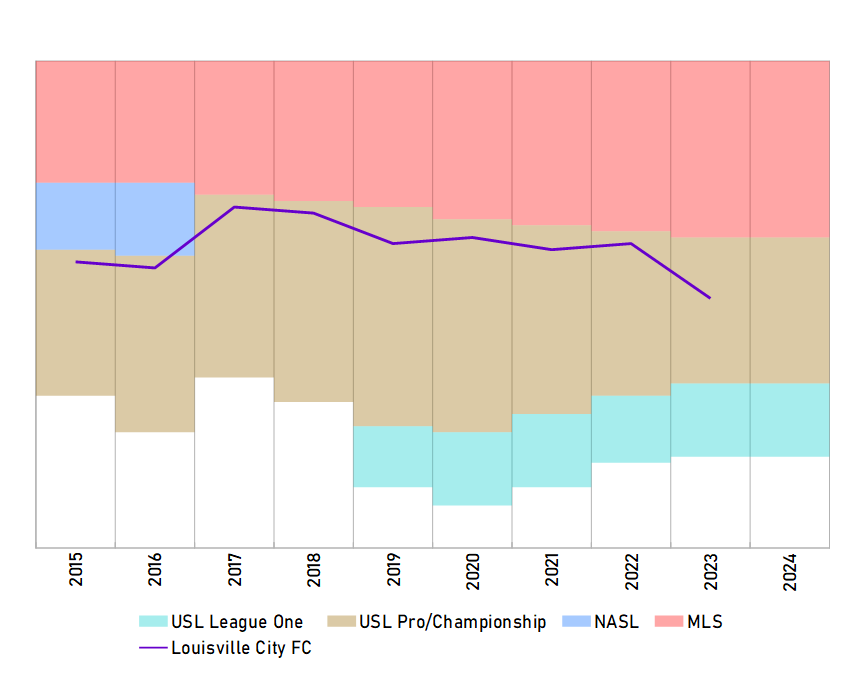
Historical chart of Louisville City's regular season performances (2015–2024)

The 2017 season began with the United Soccer League officially moving from the third tier to the second on the United States Soccer Pyramid, solidifying Louisville City and the rest of the league as the second biggest in the country. This season also saw Louisville bring home the league championship for the first time. The team placed first in the eastern conference and second overall. In the playoffs, they almost fell to the New York Red Bulls II on penalties in the Eastern Conference Finals for the second straight season, but they narrowly squeaked out a win. This was the third straight season that Louisville would make it to the conference finals. In the final match, they defeated the Swope Park Rangers, an MLS affiliate, 1–0 to lift their first ever league championship. In the US Open Cup they fell in the third round for the second straight season, this time to fellow USL team and main rival FC Cincinnati.

In the summer of 2018, James O'Connor stepped back as manager in order to take the head coaching position at MLS club Orlando City SC. James O'Connor left the team with a 71–28–26 record and a USL Cup win from the previous season, along with the first ever franchise win over an MLS team against the New England Revolution in the 2018 U.S. Open Cup Tournament. The team was then coached under the triumvirate of three players, George Davis IV, Paolo DelPiccolo, and Luke Spencer. On August 2, 2018, John Hackworth was appointed as the team's second-ever head coach. On November 8, the team made USL history by becoming the first team to repeat as champions of the league. The team defeated Phoenix Rising FC 1–0.

On November 30, 2018, minority owner and key founder, Wayne Estopinal, died in a plane crash on the way from the Louisville area to Chicago.

The following season, Louisville City made it to their third consecutive USL championship game but failed to complete the first ever "threepeat", falling 3–1 against Real Monarchs SLC, the USL affiliate of the MLS' Real Salt Lake.

On January 13, 2020, it was announced that James O'Connor would be returning to the organization after being fired from Orlando City SC in October 2019. This time he will serve as executive vice president of development where he will oversee the establishment of the team's youth soccer academy. O'Connor will also help with hiring staff for the NWSL's Racing Louisville in 2021.

Hackworth and the club mutually agreed to terminate his contract on April 27, 2021. Technical director Danny Cruz was appointed as interim head coach. He was named permanent head coach on October 11 of the same year.

On August 17, 2024, during a home match against Charleston Battery, the club announced that Louisville-native Jack Harlow joined the Louisville City ownership group.

== Stadium ==
=== Louisville Slugger Field (2015–2019) ===
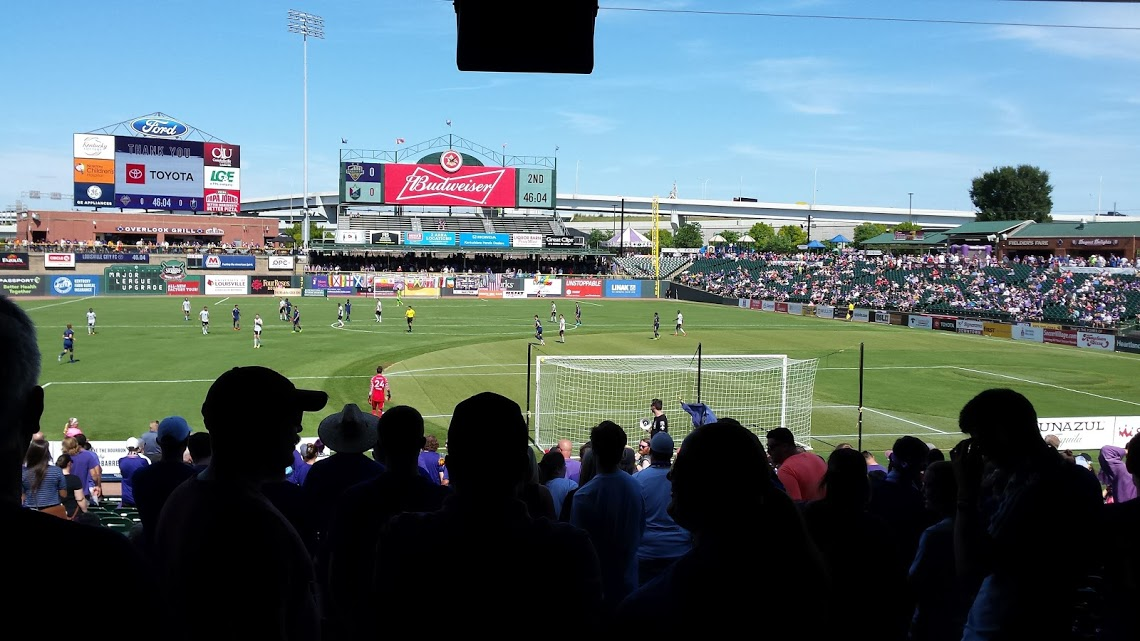
Louisville City game at Slugger Field in 2019

From the club's inaugural 2015 season through 2019, home games were played at Louisville Slugger Field. It is a multi-use facility that serves as the primary home of the Louisville Bats, Triple-A affiliate of the Cincinnati Reds. Though Slugger Field officially seats 13,131 for baseball games, an attendance of 8,000 was considered a soccer sellout due to limited viewing in the stadium's current baseball diamond configuration. The pitcher's mound at Slugger Field was retrofitted with a retractable jack to allow a level playing surface for soccer games prior to the start of the inaugural season.

=== Lynn Family Stadium ===
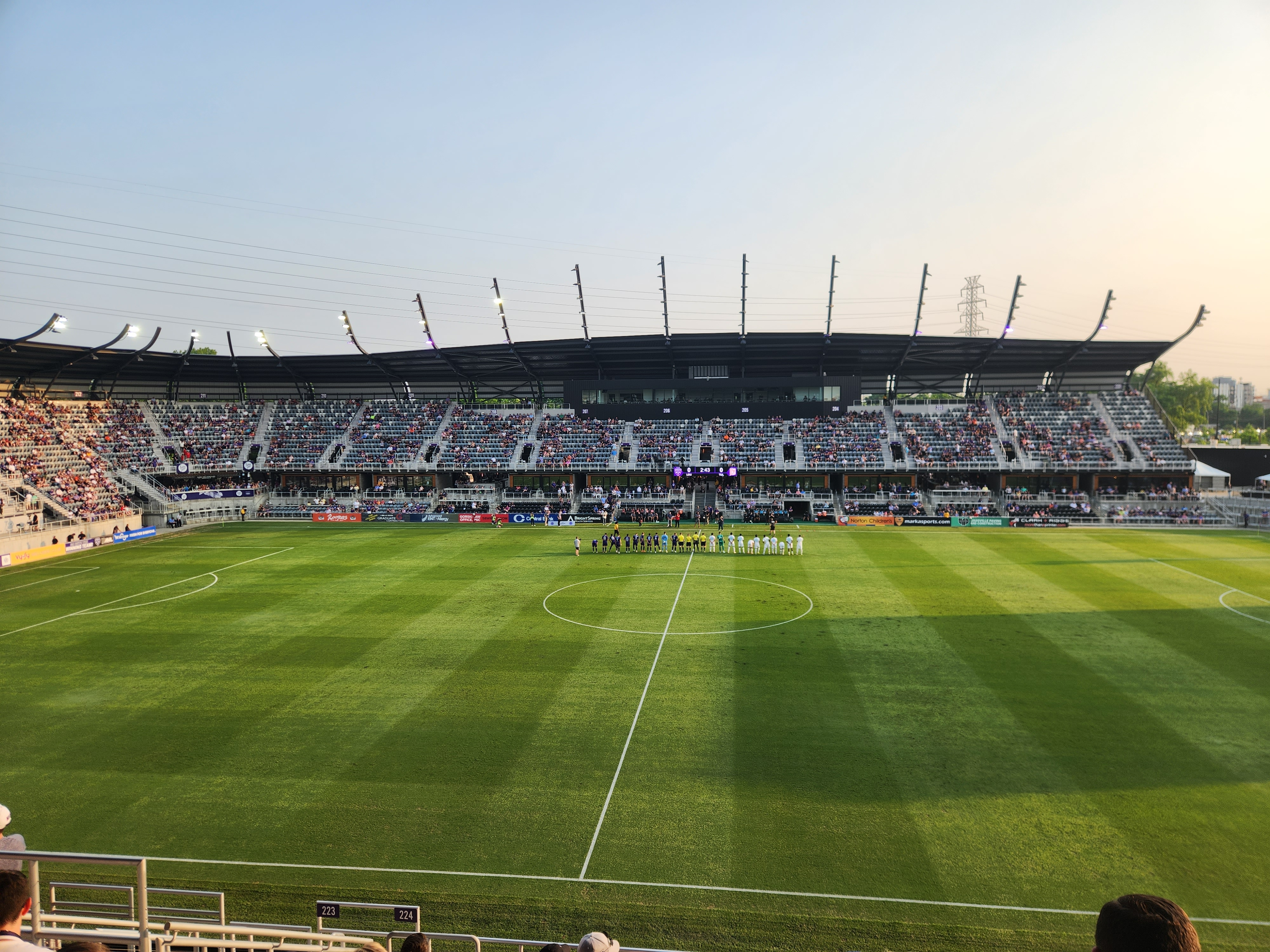
Louisville City match at Lynn Family Stadium 2023

In April 2017, the ownership group announced that it had an option to purchase five adjacent parcels of land, totaling 40 acres (16 ha), in the Butchertown neighborhood just to the east of Slugger Field for a mixed-use project that would include a 10,000-seat soccer stadium. The plan initially called for the stadium to be expandable to 20,000 seats, and the overall complex would also include offices, retail space, and a hotel.

On September 22, 2017, Louisville Metro mayor Greg Fischer announced a stadium deal that calls for the merged city–county government to borrow $30 million in order to purchase the land, with Louisville City investors responsible for developing the site and repaying about half of the borrowed funds. While the initial capacity of the stadium did not change, the revised plan allowed for possible expansion to 25,000, and it was also revealed that the overall plan could include a second hotel.

On October 26, 2017, Louisville Metro Council voted overwhelmingly to approve the stadium deal shortly after the ownership group secured $130 million in private financing for the overall project; the council voted at the same time to apply to the Kentucky General Assembly for a tax-increment financing district for the project. The stadium is currently projected to open in March 2020, satisfying a USL mandate that all franchises play in soccer-specific stadiums by the 2020 season.

Groundbreaking for the stadium was held on June 28, 2018, with an initial capacity of around 14,000 fans with permanent seating for 11,700. On August 5, 2019, the club announced that the stadium would be known as Lynn Family Stadium. The stadium bears the name of Dr. Mark Lynn, an optometrist who owned the Louisville-area franchises of the national optical retailer Visionworks. Louisville City's stadium is the second soccer venue in the city to bear the Lynn name; he and his wife Cindy are the namesakes of the University of Louisville's soccer stadium. Its capacity is officially 15,304, with enough chair-back seating for 11,600.

Lynn Family Stadium opened in 2020, with LouCity's July 12 match to Pittsburgh Riverhounds serving as the first game. In 2021, COVID-19 pandemic restrictions were lifted, allowing Lynn Family Stadium to host its first full-capacity match on June 13 against Memphis 901 FC.

== Supporters ==
In 2013, a group of soccer fans in Louisville formed a supporters group, The Coopers, to build support for professional soccer in Louisville. The Coopers take their name from Louisville's bourbon distilling tradition, where coopers make barrels that are used to age bourbon and give it a distinct flavor.

In January 2014, a potential local ownership group invited the owners of Orlando City Soccer Club to Louisville to meet with The Coopers. After the meeting, Orlando City owner Phil Rawlins noted that The Coopers were already a "great supporters group" and predicted that a professional team would be successful in Louisville.

== Rivalries ==
Louisville City's current main league and regional rivals are: Indy Eleven, Lexington SC, and historically: current MLS-side FC Cincinnati, and now-defunct Saint Louis FC.

=== The Commonwealth Cup ===
The cities of Lexington and Louisville maintain a cultural rivalry as they are the largest cities in the state of Kentucky. In 2023, Lexington SC played its first season in the United Soccer League (though they played in USL 1, the 2nd tier). During their first season, they played a much anticipated first match against Louisville in the Lamar Hunt U.S. Open Cup. Due to being in different divisions, the rivalry between the two teams was expected to be relegated to the U.S. Open Cup and USL Jägermeister Cup. In 2025, as part of a deal that saw Lexington SC build a new stadium, Lexington SC was promoted to the USL Championship league, the same division as Louisville. For this competition, both sides agreed to form a formal rivalry called The Commonwealth Cup. Each year, the two teams play 1–3 times a season for a physical trophy presented by Republic Bank.

=== Kings' Cup ===
Louisville City FC played its first professional match against Saint Louis FC on the opening day of the 2015 USL season, winning 2–0. Since then the two sides fostered a friendly rivalry for the Kings' Cup until the rivalry went dormant when Saint Louis FC dissolved in October 2020, though it would be "renewed" when St Louis City SC's reserve team began play with the Division 3 league MLS Next Pro. The two clubs faced off in a pre-season match on March 5, 2022, in St. Louis as well as in the third round of the 2022 U.S. Open Cup.

=== Dirty River Derby ===
The rivalry with FC Cincinnati for the Dirty River Derby, less commonly known as "River Cities Cup", was one of the most hotly contested matches in lower division US soccer until FC Cincinnati moved to MLS in 2018. The two cities are located a mere 100 miles apart from each other along the Ohio River. Due to this proximity, the matches tend to draw well and often featured aggressive play for local bragging rights. In 2018, Louisville City beat FC Cincinnati 5–0 in a regular season game, and in 2023, FC Cincinnati defeated Louisville City 1–0 in the third round of the U.S. Open Cup.

=== LIPAFC ===
Louisville City FC first played against another regional club, the Indy Eleven, during the 2015 U.S. Open Cup, in which Louisville City won, 2–0. The two clubs would meet again in a series of friendlies the following two seasons, as well as the 2016 U.S. Open Cup, where Indy would defeat Louisville by a score of 2–1. The arrival of the Eleven to the United Soccer League in 2018 resulted in the two becoming divisional rivals, and was given the unusual title of "Louisville-Indianapolis Proximity Association Football Contest", or "LIPAFC" during the season by both clubs on social media.

== Colors and badge ==
The club's original logo used from 2014 to 2020

The team maintained the original colors of the Orlando City franchise; purple, gold and white. The first proposed team crest featured a golden Fleur-de-lis atop of a purple bourbon barrel. However, due to fan outcry this design was abandoned and a design contest was held to select a new crest. The winning design consists of a purple Fleur-de-lis recessed into a golden bourbon barrel at the bottom with a partial skyline of the City of Louisville at the top. The partial skyline includes Preston Pointe, 400 West Market, PNC Tower, and the Humana Building.

On December 16, 2019, Louisville City unveiled a new badge, using the "LouCity" name and "combining elements from the traditional city of Louisville flag with LouCity's Signature Purple. The new crest will incorporate Oak Char Black and Kentucky Limestone Grey into the official colors of the club." However, it lasted just three days until another outcry caused "LouCity" to abandon their brand-new badge on December 19, 2019. In a statement, club president Brad Estes said, "(O)ur recent brand rollout has failed you. We had the best intentions, but we lost sight of our responsibility to engage you in the process. We have stopped production on merchandise with the new crest and have opened dialogue with supporter group leadership about how to improve our club's branding and crest."

On November 17, 2020, Louisville City unveiled a new, permanent badge designed by Matthew Wolff. The new design is a purple shield with white lettering and a trio of white fleur de lis marks. The gold from the original crest was removed due to branding concerns.

=== Sponsorship ===
Seasons	Kit manufacturer	Shirt sponsor
2015–2016	Adidas	Humana
2017–2024	Adidas	GE Appliances
2025–present	Puma	GE Appliances

== Academy ==
They have a pre-professional team Louisville City U-23 in USL League Two.

On March 9, 2020, the team announced the development of their youth academy, which is the first professional academy of its kind in Louisville and the state of Kentucky. The academy will feature two teams, one for boys and one for girls, starting at age 8 and continuing for ages under 19. The goal is to provide opportunities for players to be seen by professional teams along with collegiate ones.

On March 25, 2020, the team announced that the youth academy will become a member of the Elite Club National League. Louisville City is the first team involved with the ECNL in Kentucky. The teams of every age (8 to under 19) will compete with other ECNL members to qualify for the playoffs in the league.

The Youth Academy will play at the Champion's Park. This complex was approved for a $12 million renovation on March 5, 2020, and is funded by Louisville City FC. The complex will include three seasonal grass fields and four turf fields available for year-round use. The complex will serve as a home for youth soccer in the city and will also be where the upcoming NWSL team will practice. The site is planned to be ready for play by Spring of 2021.

== Players and staff ==
=== Current roster ===
As of March 11, 2026

Note: Flags indicate national team as defined under FIFA eligibility rules; some limited exceptions apply. Players may hold more than one non-FIFA nationality.

No.	Pos.	Nation	Player
1	GK	FRA	Hugo Fauroux
2	DF	USA	Aiden McFadden
3	DF	USA	Jake Morris
4	DF	USA	Sean Totsch
5	DF	USA	Brandon Dayes
6	MF	AUS	Zach Duncan
7	FW	USA	Ray Serrano
8	MF	USA	Taylor Davila
9	FW	USA	Chris Donovan
12	GK	USA	Danny Faundez
13	DF	USA	Amadou Dia
14	FW	ENG	Tola Showunmi
15	DF	USA	Manny Perez

No.	Pos.	Nation	Player
16	MF	USA	Carlos Moguel Jr.
19	MF	SEN	Babacar Niang
21	FW	FRA	Quenzi Huerman
23	FW	ENG	Sam Gleadle
24	DF	USA	Josh Jones
25	FW	USA	Jansen Wilson
27	MF	USA	Evan Davila
28	MF	USA	Cameron Duke
30	GK	USA	Ryan Troutman
31	MF	JAM	Kevon Lambert
32	DF	NZL	Kyle Adams
47	FW	USA	Mukwelle Akale
97	FW	USA	Thomas Weinrich

=== Front office ===
- John Neace – Chairman
- James O'Connor – President
- Brandon Morris – VP of Operations

=== Technical staff ===
- (England) Simon Bird – Interim Head Coach
- (United States) Paolo DelPiccolo – Assistant Coach
- (United States) Scott Budnick – Goalkeeping Coach

=== Club captains ===
Years	Name	Nation
2015	Matt Fondy	United States
2016	Aodhan Quinn	United States
2017–2023	Paolo DelPiccolo	United States
2024–2025	Brian Ownby	United States
2026–present	Kyle Adams	New Zealand

== Team records ==
All information in this section as of July 30, 2025

=== Record vs. international opponents ===
Date	Competition	Venue	Home team	Result	Away team	Attendance	Ref.
June 21, 2023	Friendly	Lynn Family Stadium	Louisville City FC	1–2	(Germany) 1. FC Kaiserslautern	7,167	
July 16, 2023	Friendly	Lynn Family Stadium	Louisville City FC	1–2	(Mexico) Atlante F.C.	8,176	
July 30, 2024	Friendly	Lynn Family Stadium	Louisville City FC	0–4	(Germany) Eintracht Frankfurt	10,218	
September 10, 2024	Friendly	Lynn Family Stadium	Louisville City FC	4–2	(Mexico) Cancún F.C.	5,071	
July 12, 2025	Friendly	Lynn Family Stadium	Louisville City FC	1–2	(Spain) CD Leganés	6,354	
July 29, 2025	Friendly	Lynn Family Stadium	Louisville City FC	2–5	(Germany) Eintracht Frankfurt	8,162	

=== Year-by-year ===
This is a partial list of the last five seasons completed by the club. For the full season-by-season history, see List of Louisville City FC seasons.

Season	League											Position		Playoffs	USOC	Continental	Average attendance	Top goalscorer(s)	
Season	Div	League	Pld	W	L	D	GF	GA	GD	Pts	PPG	Conf.	Overall	Playoffs	USOC	Continental	Average attendance	Name	Goals
2021	2	USLC	32	18	7	7	61	37	+24	61	1.91	2nd	4th	SF	NH	DNQ	10,088	(England) Cameron Lancaster	21
2022	2	USLC	34	22	6	6	65	28	+37	72	2.12	1st	2nd	RU	R16	DNQ	10,465	(United States) Wilson Harris	17
2023	2	USLC	34	14	12	8	41	55	−3	50	1.47	5th	10th	SF	R3	DNQ	10,549	(England) Cameron Lancaster	11
2024	2	USLC	34	24	6	4	86	43	+43	76	1.24	1st	1st	SF	Ro32	DNQ	9,707	(United States) Wilson Harris	20
2025	2	USLC	30	22	7	1	56	19	+37	73	2.43	1st	1st	QF	Ro32	DNQ	9,655	(United States) Phillip Goodrum	13

1. Avg. attendance include statistics from league matches only.
2. Top goalscorer(s) includes all goals scored in league, league playoffs, U.S. Open Cup, CONCACAF Champions League, FIFA Club World Cup, and other competitive continental matches.

=== Head coaches ===
All Time Louisville City FC Coaching Statistics^
Coach	Nationality	Start	End	Games	Win	Loss	Draw	Win %
James O'Connor	Ireland	June 4, 2014	June 30, 2018	125	69	25	31	55.20
Player Coaches‡	United States	July 1, 2018	August 12, 2018	7	4	2	1	57.14
John Hackworth	United States	August 13, 2018	April 27, 2021	78	48	16	14	61.54
Danny Cruz (interim)	United States	April 27, 2021	October 11, 2021	27	15	5	7	55.56
Danny Cruz	United States	October 11, 2021	March 17, 2026	164	102	37	25	62.20
Simon Bird (interim)	England	March 17, 2026	Present	37	20	10	7	54.05

^ Includes USL regular season, USL Playoffs, U.S. Open Cup. Excludes friendlies.
‡ Luke Spencer, Paolo DelPiccolo, & George Davis IV appointed joint interim head coaches. Commonly known as "The Triumvirate".

=== Attendance average ===
Season	Regular season	Playoffs	Total Average
2015	6,765	8,517	6,882
2016	7,218	6,024	7,078
2017	8,601	9,500	8,781
2018	7,888	7,682	7,849
2019	9,041	5,831	8,797
2020	4,859	4,900	4,868
2021	10,088	9,126	9,981
2022	10,465	10,036	10,420
2023	10,549	7,959	10,405
2024	9,704	9,192	9,650
2025	9,751	8,210	9,655

== Player career records ==
=== Appearances ===
As of October 23, 2026

#	Name	Career	USL	Playoffs	Open Cup	USL Cup	Total
1	(United States) Sean Totsch	2017–	282	27	9	9	338
2	(Republic of Ireland) Niall McCabe	2015–2025	272	18	16	1	272
3	(United States) Paolo DelPiccolo	2016–2023	202	25	15	0	242
4	(United States) Brian Ownby	2017–2025	178	24	13	2	217
5	(United States) Oscar Jimenez	2016–2023	169	23	13	0	205

=== Goals ===
As of October, 23 2026

#	Name	Career	USL	Playoffs	Open Cup	USL Cup	Total
1	(England) Cameron Lancaster	2015–18, 2020–23	76	9	4	0	89
2	(United States) Wilson Harris	2022–2025	43	0	3	0	46
3	(United States) Brian Ownby	2017–2025	24	9	3	0	36
3	(United States) Sean Totch	2017–	29	0	7	0	36
5	(Denmark) Magnus Rasmussen	2015–16, 2018–19	25	4	0	0	29

=== Assists ===
As of October 23, 2026

#	Name	Career	USL	Playoffs	Open Cup	USL Cup	Total
1	(United States) Brian Ownby	2017–	39	6	1	0	46
2	(United States) Oscar Jimenez	2016–2023	29	6	4	0	39
3	(United States) Taylor Davila	2024–	26	1	1	4	32
4	(Republic of Ireland) Niall McCabe	2015–2025	24	3	3	0	30
5	(United States) Ray Serrano	2015–2018	24	1	0	0	25

== Honors ==
United Soccer League

- USL Cup
  - Winners (1): (gold) 2026

USL Championship

- USL Postseason Cup
  - Winners (2): (gold) 2017, 2018
  - Runners-up (3): (silver) 2019, 2022, 2026
- USL Regular Season/USL Championship Players' Shield
  - Winners (2): (gold) 2024, 2025
  - Runners-up (4): (silver) 2015, 2016, 2017, 2022
- USL Eastern Conference
  - Winners (Playoffs) (5): (gold) 2017, 2018, 2019, 2022, 2026

Other

- Kings' Cup
  - Champions (6): (gold) 2015, 2016, 2017, 2018, 2019, 2020
- Dirty River Derby
  - Champions (2): (gold) 2017, 2018
- LIPAFC
  - Champions (5): (gold) 2015, 2018, 2019, 2020, 2023

== League honors ==
- Most Valuable Player
  - Matt Fondy : 2015
- Coach of the Year
  - Danny Cruz : 2024
- Defender of the Year
  - Bryan Burke : 2015
- Goalkeeper of the Year
  - Ben Lundt : 2020
- Young Player of the Year
  - Jonathan Gómez : 2021
  - Elijah Wynder : 2024
- Comeback Player of the Year
  - Elijah Wynder: 2022
- Golden Boot
  - Matt Fondy : 2015 (22 Goals)
  - Cameron Lancaster: 2018 (25 Goals)
- Golden Glove
  - Kyle Morton : 2022
- Golden Playmaker
  - Bryan Burke : 2015 (10 Assists)
- USL Cup Final MVP
  - Paolo DelPiccolo : 2017
  - Luke Spencer : 2018
- USL All-League 1st Team
  - Bryan Burke : 2015
  - Matt Fondy : 2015
  - Paco Craig : 2017, 2018
  - Cameron Lancaster: 2018, 2020
  - Ben Lundt : 2020
  - Sean Totsch : 2020, 2021, 2022
  - Devon Williams : 2020
  - Jonathan Gómez : 2021

== See also ==
- Sports in Louisville, Kentucky
