= Wilson Harris (soccer) =

American soccer player (born 1999)

- Wilson Harris with the New England Revolution in 2026

Personal information
- Full name: Wilson Israel Harris
- Date of birth: November 28, 1999 (age 26)
- Place of birth: Los Angeles, California, United States
- Height: 5 ft 11 in (1.80 m)
- Position: Forward

Team information
- Current team: New England Revolution
- Number: 27

Youth career
- 2011–2015: Real So Cal
- 2016: Seattle Sounders FC
- 2016–2017: Real So Cal
- 2017–2018: Sporting Kansas City

Senior career*
Years	Team	Apps	(Gls)
2018–2021	Sporting Kansas City II	66	(25)
2019–2021	Sporting Kansas City	9	(0)
2022–2024	Louisville City	99	(43)
2025	Maccabi Petah Tikva	15	(5)
2025–2026	Maccabi Netanya	18	(5)
2026–	New England Revolution	1	(0)
- * Club domestic league appearances and goals as of 26 July, 2026

Wilson Israel Harris (born November 28, 1999) is an American professional soccer player who plays as a forward for the New England Revolution in Major League Soccer.

== Club career ==
Born in Los Angeles, California, Harris began his career in the U.S. Soccer Development Academy with Real So Cal in 2011 before having a short stint in the youth academy of Seattle Sounders FC in 2016. He then returned to Real So Cal before joining the Sporting Kansas City youth academy in 2017. On March 13, 2018, it was announced that Harris had committed to playing college soccer with the Louisville Cardinals.

Harris made his senior debut on May 5, 2018, for Sporting Kansas City's reserve side, Swope Park Rangers, in the USL Championship against OKC Energy. He came on as an 81st-minute substitute during 1–0 victory. Harris scored his first professional goal on June 17 against Fresno FC, a consolation goal in the 86th minute of a 4–1 defeat. He would go on to end his first season with Swope Park with 3 goals in 15 appearances. On July 3, 2018, Harris signed a professional contract with Swope Park Rangers, opting out of playing with the Louisville Cardinals.

The next season, Harris scored 12 goals from 25 games for Swope Park Rangers. On May 17, 2019, Harris joined Swope Park's parent club, Sporting Kansas City, on a short-term loan due to injuries in the first team. The next day, Harris appeared on the bench for Sporting Kansas City during a 1–1 draw against the Vancouver Whitecaps FC, but did not come on as a substitute. On September 21, 2019, Harris scored a brace for Swope Park Rangers against the Charlotte Independence during a 3–0 victory.

In 2020, Harris continued his scoring for the newly named Sporting Kansas City II, scoring 8 goals in 16 matches during a COVID-19 affected season. At the end the season, Harris was named the USL Championship Young Player of the Year.

=== Sporting Kansas City ===
On October 21, 2020, Harris signed a homegrown player deal with Sporting Kansas City ahead of the 2021 season.

Following the 2021 season, Harris' contract option was declined by Kansas City.

=== Louisville City FC ===
Harris joined USL Championship club Louisville City on February 3, 2022.

=== Maccabi Petah Tikva and Maccabi Netanya ===
In early 2025, Harris moved abroad to play in the Israeli Premier League, signing with Maccabi Petah Tikva. He made 15 league appearances and scored 5 goals during the 2024–25 campaign. Ahead of the following season, he transferred to Maccabi Netanya, where he made 18 league appearances, contributing an additional 5 goals and 1 assist.

=== New England Revolution ===
On July 1, 2026, Harris returned to Major League Soccer, signing a one-year contract with the New England Revolution through the 2026 season, with club options extending into 2028. He made his debut later that month following the league's mid-season break on July 22, coming on as a 73rd minute substitute for Dor Turgeman in a 0-0 draw against Toronto FC. Harris scored his first goal for the club in an away match against Toronto FC on August 15.

== International career ==
Harris has represented the United States at the under-16, under-18, and under-20 teams.

== Career statistics ==
As of match played April 17, 2024

Appearances and goals by club, season and competition
Club	Season	League			Cup		Total	
Club	Season	Division	Apps	Goals	Apps	Goals	Apps	Goals
Sporting Kansas City II	2018	United Soccer League	15	3	—		15	3
Sporting Kansas City II	2019	USL Championship	25	12	—		25	12
Sporting Kansas City II	2020	USL Championship	16	8	—		16	8
Sporting Kansas City II	2021	USL Championship	10	2	—		10	2
Sporting Kansas City II	Total		66	25	—		66	25
Sporting Kansas City	2021	Major League Soccer	9	0	—		9	0
Louisville City FC	2022	USL Championship	34	15	4	2	38	17
Louisville City FC	2023	USL Championship	31	9	2	0	33	9
Louisville City FC	2024	USL Championship	34	19	2	1	36	20
Louisville City FC	Total		119	43	8	3	127	46
Maccabi Petah Tikva	2024–25	Israeli Premier Leaugue	15	5	0	0	15	5
Maccabi Petah Tikva	Total		15	5	0	0	15	5
Maccabi Netanya	2025–26	Israeli Premier Leaugue	0	0	0	0	0	0
Maccabi Netanya	Total		0	0	0	0	0	0
Career total			194	73	8	3	202	76

== Honors ==
Individual

- USL Championship Young Player of the Year: 2020
- USL Championship Player of the Month: March 2024
