= Jansen Wilson =

American soccer player (born 2001)

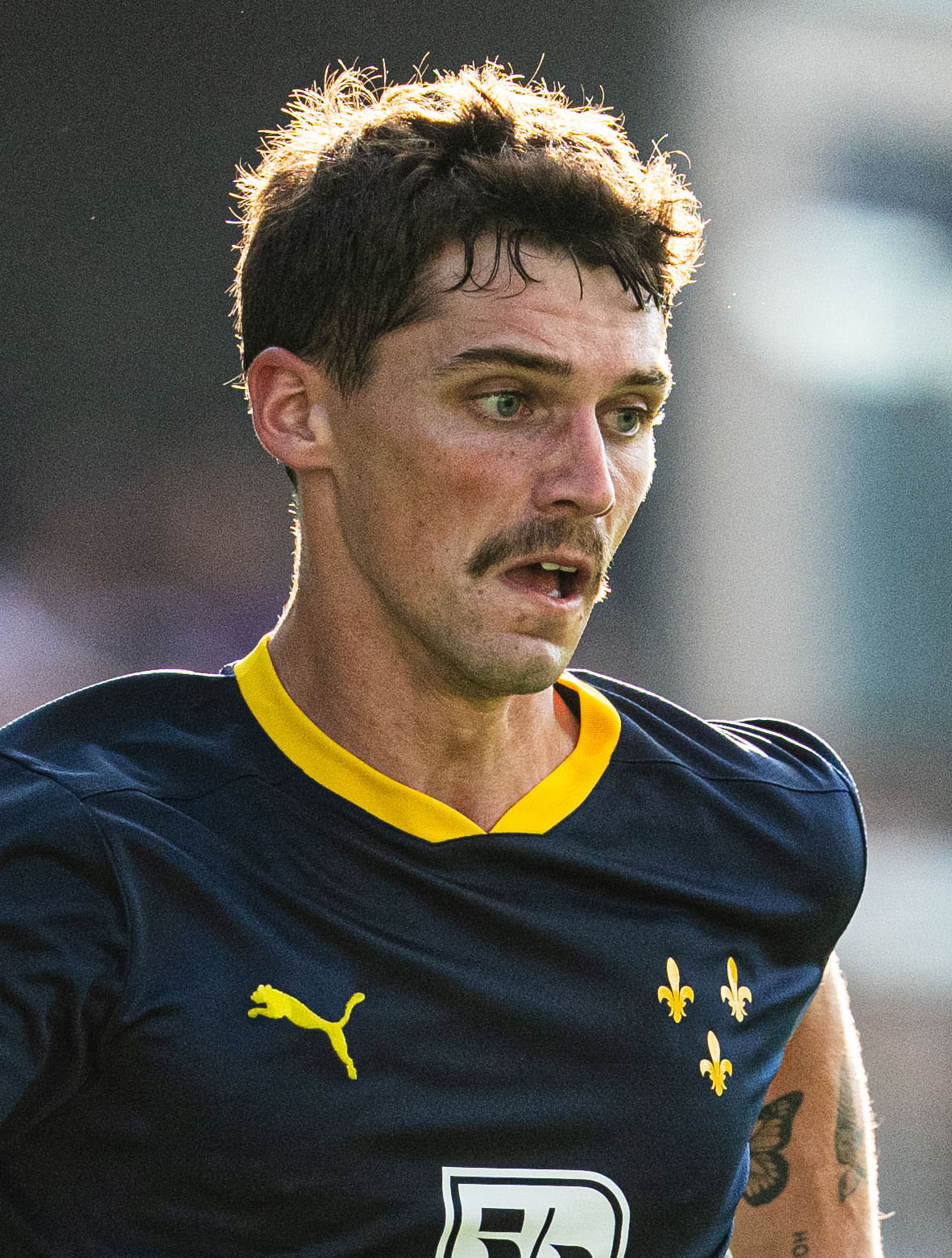
- Wilson with Louisville City in 2025

Personal information
- Date of birth: June 14, 2001 (age 25)
- Place of birth: Elizabethtown, Kentucky, United States
- Height: 5 ft 11 in (1.80 m)
- Positions: Midfielder; defender

Team information
- Current team: Louisville City
- Number: 25

Youth career
- 2018: Columbus Crew

College career
Years	Team	Apps	(Gls)
2019–2021	Kentucky Wildcats	41	(4)
2022–2023	Belmont Bruins	36	(6)

Senior career*
Years	Team	Apps	(Gls)
2024–	Louisville City	86	(23)
- * Club domestic league appearances and goals as of November 7, 2026

Jansen Wilson (born June 14, 2001) is an American soccer player who plays for Louisville City in the USL Championship.

== Early life ==
=== Personal ===
Wilson was born in Elizabethtown, Kentucky to parents Julie and Jeff Wilson and has two older brothers; Jacob and Jarod. He started playing soccer at an early age with the Elizabethtown Youth Soccer Association and then with Javanon FC where he would win the U.S. Youth Soccer Region II championship. He also travelled internationally with the Olympic Development Program. He attended Elizabethtown High School where he played soccer for three years before joins the Columbus Crew academy his senior year. During his time with Elizabethtown he scored 50 goals with 55 assists. His final year with the team he was named Kentucky's Gatorade Player of the Year as well as being a first team All-State selection and Kentucky Youth Soccer Association's player of the year.

=== College and youth ===
Wilson played three years of college soccer at the University of Kentucky between 2019 and 2021 before transferring to Belmont University. With Kentucky he appeared in 41 matches scoring four goals with two assists while winning the 2021 Conference USA post season tournament. During his two seasons with Belmont he scored six goals with eleven assists across 36 matches. During both seasons he was named to the All-MVC second team and was named to the All-Tournament team as a Senior.

During this time Wilson also trained with Louisville City FC for two seasons during the summer.

== Club career ==
=== Louisville City ===
On February 16, 2024, Wilson signed his first professional contract with Louisville City FC and made his professional debut in the season opener against El Paso. He would score his first professional goal against Indy Eleven as part of the LIPAFC rivalry match.

== Personal life ==
Wilson married Logan Barber in 2024. Who he met while travelling with the Olympic Development Program.
