= Arturo Ordoñez =

Spanish footballer (born 1997)

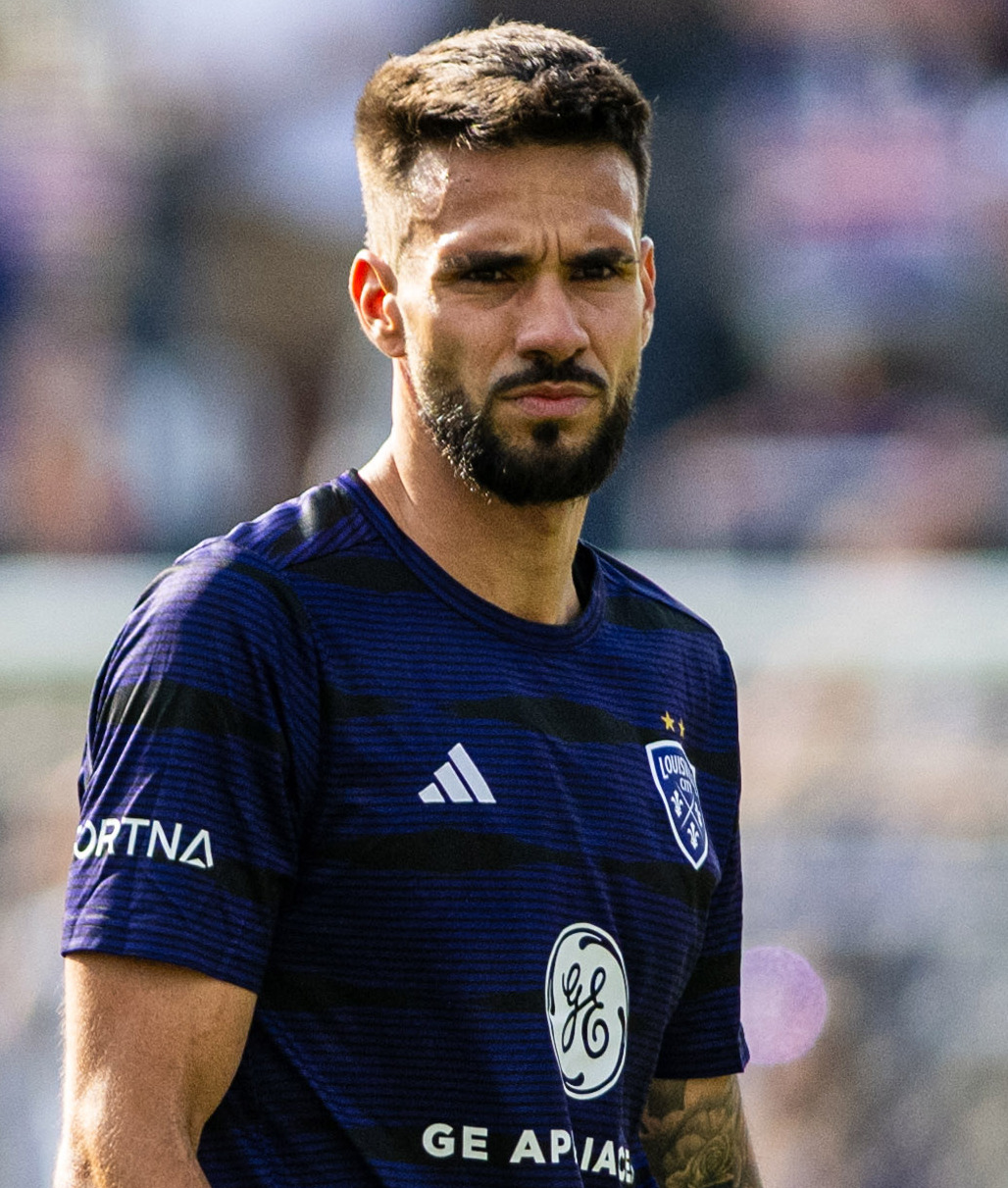
- Arturo Ordoñez playing for Louisville City in 2024

Personal information
- Full name: Arturo Osuna Ordoñez
- Date of birth: 22 May 1997 (age 29)
- Place of birth: Salou, Spain
- Height: 1.90 m (6 ft 3 in)
- Position: Defender

Team information
- Current team: Hartford Athletic on loan from Lexington SC

Youth career
- –2014: Pobla de Mafumet
- 2014–2015: Gimnàstic

College career
Years	Team	Apps	(Gls)
2019–2021	Pittsburgh Panthers	57	(6)

Senior career*
Years	Team	Apps	(Gls)
2016–2019	Pobla de Mafumet	45	(1)
2018	→ Castelldefels (loan)	18	(0)
2022–2023	Pittsburgh Riverhounds	63	(6)
2024–2025	Louisville City	49	(2)
2026–	Lexington SC	15	(0)
2026	→ Hartford Athletic (loan)	1	(0)
- * Club domestic league appearances and goals as of 22:59, 4 November 2026 (UTC)

Arturo Osuna Ordoñez (born 22 May 1997) is a Spanish footballer who plays as a defender for USL Championship club Hartford Athletic on loan from Lexington SC.

== Career ==
Ordoñez played with the academy teams at Pobla de Mafumet and Gimnàstic. He went on to play with Pobla de Mafumet in the Tercera División, including a loan spell with Castelldefels.

In 2019, Ordoñez moved to the United States to play college soccer at the University of Pittsburgh. He went on to make 57 appearances for the Panthers during his time there, scoring six goals and tallying four assists. During his time at college, he was a two-time All-ACC Academic Team, two-time All-ACC Tournament Team, All-ACC Freshman Team, All-ACC Third Team and All-ACC Second Team.

On 11 January 2022, Ordoñez was selected 39th overall in the 2022 MLS SuperDraft by Houston Dynamo. However, he was not signed by the club.

On 17 February 2022, Ordoñez signed with USL Championship club Pittsburgh Riverhounds. He made his debut for the Riverhounds on 12 March 2022, starting in a 3–0 win over Memphis 901. Following the 2023 season, Ordoñez was named USL Championship Defender of the Year as Pittsburgh Riverhounds captured the 2023 Players' Shield.

On 8 December 2023, it was announced that had joined Louisville City ahead of the 2024 USL Championship season. Following the end of the 2025 season, Ordoñez was released by Louisville.

On 8 December 2025, it was announced that Ordoñez signed with Lexington SC ahead of the 2026 USL Championship season.

In August 2026, Hartford Athletic announced they had acquired Ordoñez on loan from Lexington SC for the remainder of the USL Championship season.
