= LIPAFC =

Soccer rivalry in the United States

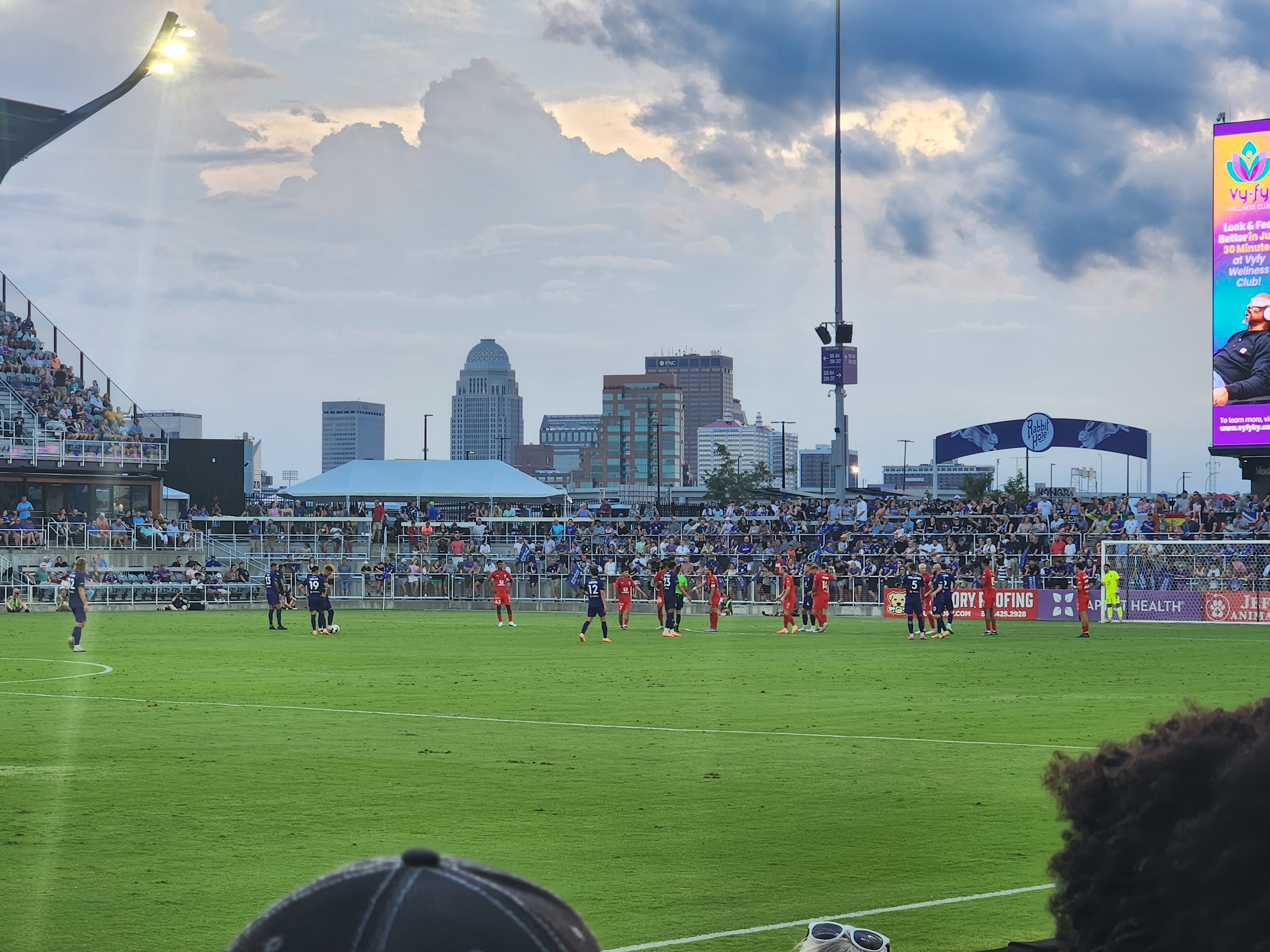
- Louisville City FC taking a free kick against Indy Eleven
- Other names: Louisville–Indianapolis Proximity Association Football Contest
- Sport: Soccer
- Location: Ohio Valley
- Teams: Indy Eleven; Louisville City
- First meeting: May 27, 2015; U.S. Open Cup; Indy Eleven 0–2 Louisville City
- Latest meeting: August 22, 2026; USL Championship; Indy Eleven 2–1 Louisville City
- Next meeting: October 17, 2026; USL Championship
- Stadiums: Carroll Stadium (Indy Eleven); Lynn Family Stadium (Louisville City)

Statistics
- Total meetings: 26
- Most wins: Louisville City (13)
- Most player appearances: Paolo DelPiccolo (17)
- Top scorer: Tyler Pasher (5); Cameron Lancaster (5)
- All-time series (USL Championship only): Louisville City: 13; Drawn: 7 Indy Eleven: 6
- Largest victory: Louisville City 4–1 Indy Eleven (October 20, 2018)
- Largest goal scoring: Louisville City 5–3 Indy Eleven (April 6, 2024)
- Longest win streak: Louisville City (3)
- Longest unbeaten streak: Louisville City (10)
- Current win streak: Indy Eleven (1)
- Current unbeaten streak: Indy Eleven (1)

The Louisville–Indianapolis proximity association football contest (LIPAFC) (/lɪpəˈɛfsi/) is a rivalry between American professional soccer clubs Louisville City FC and the Indy Eleven. Louisville City play their home games at the Lynn Family Stadium in Louisville, Kentucky, while the Indy Eleven play their home games at Carroll Stadium in Indianapolis, Indiana.

Overall, Louisville have won the most matches in the rivalry's history, having won twelve times to Indy's six with seven draws. Louisville's record win was a 4–1 victory in the USL Playoffs at their former stadium, Slugger Field, on October 20, 2018. Indy has several 1 goal wins with the last of which being a 2–1 victory at Carroll Stadium on August 22, 2026.

== History ==
=== Early matches ===
The Indy Eleven began play in 2014 as a member of the NASL while Louisville City began play in 2015 as part of the USL. As they were members of different leagues they didn't play regularly. Their first competitive match came in the third round of the U.S. Open Cup on May 27, 2015. A match that Louisville City won at Carroll Stadium 0–2. As the USL was officially a third-tier league at the time this was Louisville City's first victory over an opponent from a higher-tier league. Their second meeting was also third round U.S. Open Cup match at Carroll Stadium. A 2–1 victory for the Indy Eleven giving them their first win in the series.

=== USL ===
With the NASL on the verge of financial collapse the Indy Eleven joined the USL in January 2018 making the Indy Eleven and Louisville City league rivals for the first time. Both were placed in the USL's Eastern Conference where they remain to this day. Their first league match took place on May 5, 2018, at Lucas Oil Stadium. A match the Indy Eleven won 1–0 after Ayoze García converted a penalty in the 78th-minute. Louisville City's first loss of the season. This was the first of four matches during 2018 with second being a 2–2 draw at Slugger Field. This began a ten-match unbeaten streak for Louisville. They would play one more match in the regular season before meeting in the USL Playoffs for the first time on October 20, 2018. Louisville City won this match 4–1 behind a Niall McCabe brace. The largest margin of victory in the rivalry to date.

In 2019 the Indy Eleven and Louisville City played two 1–1 matches during the regular season and would again meet in the rebranded USL Championship Playoffs. This time the Eastern Conference final on November 9 at Carroll Stadium. The Indy Eleven came in on a 27 match home unbeaten streak and scored the opening 67th-minute off the foot of Tyler Pasher. Four minutes into stoppage time Antoine Hoppenot scored the tying goal sending the match in extra time. Four minutes into extra time Magnus Rasmussen put Louisville City ahead and a Luke Spencer in penalty in the 113th-minute lead to a final score line 1–3 as Louisville City advanced to the USL Championship Final.

The next two seasons were affected by the COVID-19 pandemic causing the USL to modify its format. During both seasons the Eastern Conference was subdivided into multiple groups and divisions with the Indy Eleven and Louisville City being placed in the same subdivision each year. During both years the clubs would play a record four regular season matches against each other. The Indy Eleven would fail to win a match against Louisville City until May 29, 2021. When a pair of Jordan Hamilton penalties at Lynn Family Stadium lead to a 1–2 Indy Eleven victory. The result ended a three-match winning streak and ten-match unbeaten run in the rivalry for Louisville City. On October 16, 2021, the Indy Eleven would earn a 1–0 at Carroll Stadium which began a 3 match unbeaten streak.

Louisville City's 5–3 victory over Indy Eleven on April 6, 2024, was the first USL Championship match to be nationally broadcast on network TV through CBS. The match is also the highest-scoring LIPAFC game to date, surpassing the 3–3 draw on June 26, 2021.

== Mythology ==
The name "LIPAFC", used in an unofficial capacity by the clubs' supporter groups, is a tongue-in-cheek parody of rivalries manufactured through geographic proximity as opposed to on-field action. Satirical pseudohistorical stories color the rivalry, such as an 1865 match in which Indy Eleven played in infantry uniforms after returning from combat in the American Civil War, an 1868 match in which a Civil War veteran assaulted a referee with his prosthetic leg, and 1926 match which ended in a 36–35 penalty shootout. Internet memes and in-jokes also bolster the satirical nature of the rivalry, such as Indy Eleven supporters opposing Kentucky Fried Chicken, and claiming Louisville City are Nickelback fans. The overall winner of the two LIPAFC games each season are presented with the fan-made LIPFAC Barrel Trophy — a construction barrel with an Interstate 65 sign stuck on top, and a small plastic trophy taped on the side. Fans claim the trophy was partly made with pieces of the mythological Trojan Horse.

== Results ==
=== Summary ===
As of August 22, 2026

	Matches	IND wins	Draws	LOU wins	IND goals	LOU goals
USL regular season	22	5	7	10	24	36
USL Cup Playoffs	2	0	0	2	2	7
U.S. Open Cup	2	1	0	1	2	3
Total	26	6	7	13	28	46

=== Matches ===
Season	Date	Competition	Stadium	Home team	Result	Away team	Attendance	Series	Ref
2015	May 27	U.S. Open Cup	Carroll Stadium	Indy Eleven	0–2	Louisville City FC	7,134	LOU 1–0–0	
2016	June 1	U.S. Open Cup	Carroll Stadium	Indy Eleven	2–1	Louisville City FC	2,145	Tied 1–1–0	
2018	May 5	USL	Lucas Oil Stadium	Indy Eleven	1–0	Louisville City FC	9,008	IND 2–1–0	
2018	August 5	USL	Louisville Slugger Field	Louisville City FC	2–2	Indy Eleven	8,437	IND 2–1–1	
2018	October 13	USL	Louisville Slugger Field	Louisville City FC	1–0	Indy Eleven	10,686	Tied 2–2–1	
2018	October 20	USL Playoffs	Louisville Slugger Field	Louisville City FC	4–1	Indy Eleven	6,763	LOU 3–2–1	
2019	June 29	USL Championship	Lucas Oil Stadium	Indy Eleven	1–1	Louisville City FC	10,584	LOU 3–2–2	
2019	August 30	USL Championship	Louisville Slugger Field	Louisville City FC	1–1	Indy Eleven	9,211	LOU 3–2–3	
2019	November 9	USL Championship Playoffs	Carroll Stadium	Indy Eleven	1–3	Louisville City FC	7,171	LOU 4–2–3	
2020	August 8	USL Championship	Lynn Family Stadium	Louisville City FC	1–1	Indy Eleven	4,850†	LOU 4–2–4	
2020	August 26	USL Championship	Lynn Family Stadium	Louisville City FC	1–0	Indy Eleven	4,851†	LOU 5–2–4	
2020	September 5	USL Championship	Lucas Oil Stadium	Indy Eleven	1–3	Louisville City FC	6,778†	LOU 6–2–4	
2020	September 16	USL Championship	Lucas Oil Stadium	Indy Eleven	0–2	Louisville City FC	2,500†	LOU 7–2–4	
2021	May 29	USL Championship	Lynn Family Stadium	Louisville City FC	1–2	Indy Eleven	10,731	LOU 7–3–4	
2021	June 26	USL Championship	Lynn Family Stadium	Louisville City FC	3–3	Indy Eleven	10,927	LOU 7–3–5	
2021	September 18	USL Championship	Carroll Stadium	Indy Eleven	0–2	Louisville City FC	6,499	LOU 8–3–5	
2021	October 16	USL Championship	Carroll Stadium	Indy Eleven	1–0	Louisville City FC	6,499	LOU 8–4–5	
2022	March 26	USL Championship	Lynn Family Stadium	Louisville City FC	1–1	Indy Eleven	8,551	LOU 8–4–6	
2022	August 31	USL Championship	Carroll Stadium	Indy Eleven	1–0	Louisville City FC	8,275	LOU 8–5–6	
2023	May 27	USL Championship	Carroll Stadium	Indy Eleven	0–1	Louisville City FC	9,532	LOU 9–5–6	
2023	July 29	USL Championship	Lynn Family Stadium	Louisville City FC	2–0	Indy Eleven	13,248	LOU 10–5–6	
2024	April 6	USL Championship	Lynn Family Stadium	Louisville City FC	5–3	Indy Eleven	11,330	LOU 11–5–6	
2024	October 5	USL Championship	Carroll Stadium	Indy Eleven	2–2	Louisville City FC	10,780	LOU 11–5–7	
2025	August 30	USL Championship	Carroll Stadium	Indy Eleven	1–3	Louisville City FC	10,230	LOU 12–5–7	
2025	October 4	USL Championship	Lynn Family Stadium	Louisville City FC	2–0	Indy Eleven	9,785	LOU 13–5–7	
2026	August 22	USL Championship	Carroll Stadium	Indy Eleven	2–1	Louisville City FC	9,542	LOU 13–6–7	
2026	October 17	USL Championship	Lynn Family Stadium	Louisville City FC	TBD	Indy Eleven			

† Matches played at reduced capacity due to the COVID-19 pandemic.

=== Eastern Conference standings finishes ===
IND LOU

P.	2018	2019	2020	2021	2022	2023	2024	2025
1			1		1		1	1
2	2			2				
3		3						
4		4					4	
5						5		
6						6		
7	7							
8								
9			9		9			9
10								
11								
12				12				

• Total: Louisville City with 6 higher finishes, Indy Eleven with 1.

== Top goalscorers ==
As of August 22, 2026.

Position	Nation	Name	Team	Goals
T-1	(Canada) CAN	Tyler Pasher	Indy Eleven	5
T-1	(England) ENG	Cameron Lancaster	Louisville City FC	5
2	(United States) USA	Corben Bone	Louisville City FC	4
T-3	(Scotland) SCO	**Jack Blake**	Indy Eleven	3
T-3	(United States) USA	Paolo DelPiccolo	Louisville City FC	3
T-3	(United States) USA	Wilson Harris	Louisville City FC	3
T-3	(Brazil) BRA	Stefano Pinho	Indy Eleven	3
T-4	(Sierra Leone) SLE	Augustine Williams	Indy Eleven	2
T-4	(France) FRA	Antoine Hoppenot	Louisville City FC	2
T-4	(Jamaica) JAM	Devon Williams	Louisville City FC	2
T-4	(Republic of Ireland) IRL	Niall McCabe	Louisville City FC	2
T-4	(United States) USA	Jack McInerney	Indy Eleven	2
T-4	(Canada) CAN	Jordan Hamilton	Indy Eleven	2
T-4	(Venezuela) VEN	Manuel Arteaga	Indy Eleven	2

Bold denotes players still playing for the club.

== Honors ==
Table correct as of 2025 season.

Team	USL Cup	Supporters' Shield	U.S. Open Cup	Total
Indy Eleven	0	**1**†	0	1
Louisville City FC	**2**	**2**	0	**4**
Combined	2	3	0	5

†Includes 2016 NASL Spring Championship.

== Players who have played for both clubs ==
Louisville City, then Indy Eleven

- (Serbia) Ilija Ilić
- (United States) Aodhan Quinn

Indy Eleven, then Louisville City

- (United States) Tyler Gibson
- (United States) Dylan Mares
- (United States) Kenney Walker (loan between the two clubs)
