= Jake Morris (soccer) =

American soccer player (born 1999)

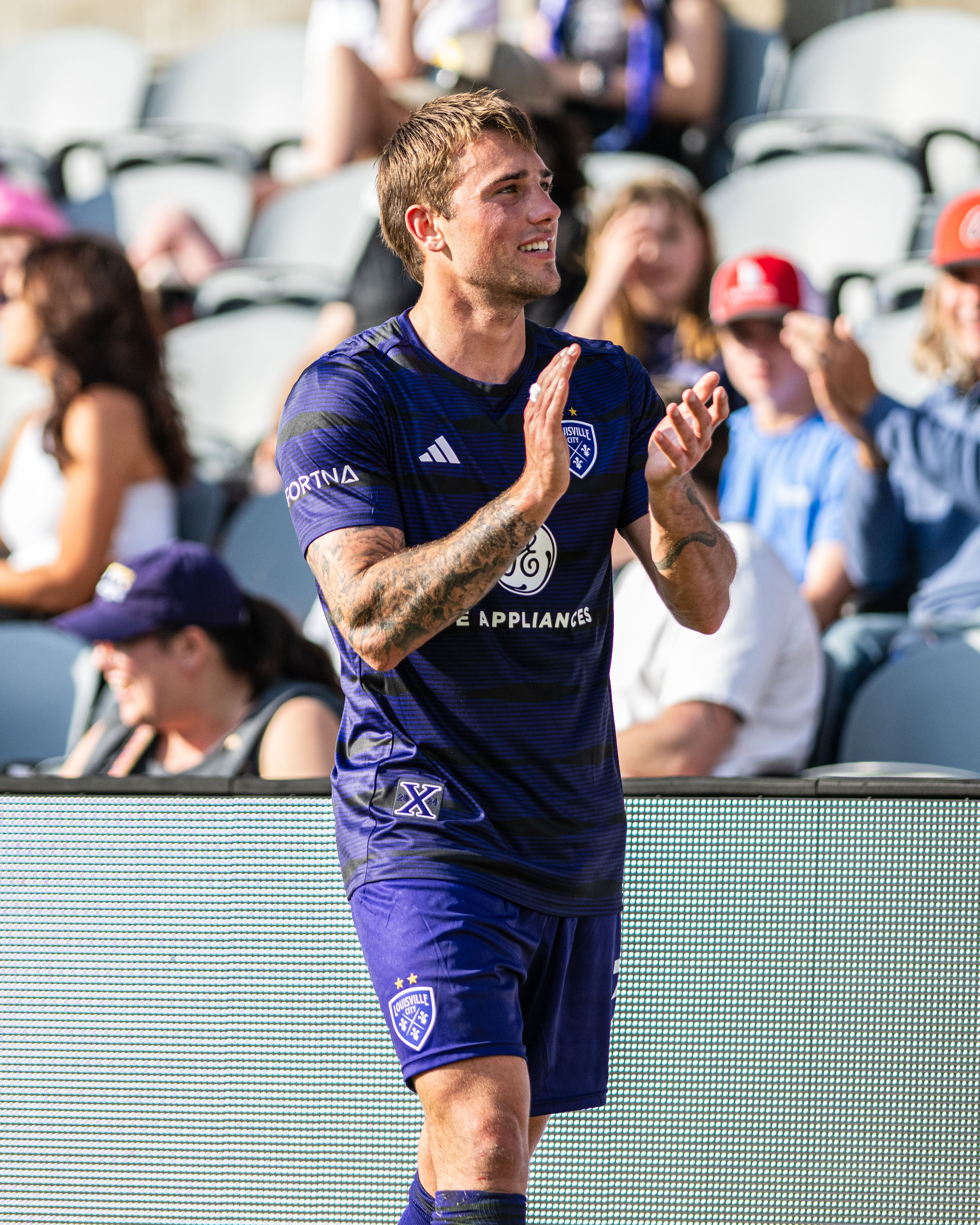
- Jake Morris playing for Louisville City in 2024

Personal information
- Full name: Jake Francis Morris
- Date of birth: March 3, 1999 (age 27)
- Place of birth: Fort Lauderdale, Florida, United States
- Height: 1.87 m (6 ft 2 in)
- Position: Defender

Team information
- Current team: Louisville City
- Number: 3

Youth career
- 2013–2016: Weston FC
- 2016–2018: Seattle Sounders FC

College career
Years	Team	Apps	(Gls)
2018–2020	Tyler Apaches	45	(12)
2020–2021	Campbell Camels	28	(7)

Senior career*
Years	Team	Apps	(Gls)
2016–2018	Seattle Sounders FC 2	4	(0)
2018	Weston FC	1	(0)
2021	Mississippi Brilla	7	(0)
2022–2023	Columbus Crew	0	(0)
2022–2023	Columbus Crew 2	26	(1)
2023	→ Loudoun United (loan)	12	(0)
2024–	Louisville City	65	(9)

International career^{‡}
2016	United States U19	2	(0)
2016	United States U20	2	(0)
- * Club domestic league appearances and goals as of November 7, 2026 ‡ National team caps and goals as of June 3, 2020

Jake Francis Morris (born March 3, 1999) is an American soccer player who plays for Louisville City in the USL Championship.

== Career ==
Morris began his youth career with Weston FC in Florida before joining the Seattle Sounders FC academy in 2016. On August 20, 2016, Morris made his debut for USL club Seattle Sounders FC 2 in a 0–2 defeat to San Antonio FC.

In January 2022 the Columbus Crew announced they had acquired Morris' rights from Seattle, and signed him to a contract through 2023 with options for 2024 and 2025. Morris would spend the bulk of the 2022 season with Columbus Crew 2 in MLS Next Pro, making his debut on April 3 against Chicago Fire FC II. He made his debut for the first team on April 19 in a U.S. Open Cup match against Detroit City. After seeing zero MLS season minutes in 2023, Morris was loaned to USL Championship side Loudoun United FC on June 27. Three days later, Morris made his debut, playing 45 minutes as a second-half substitute in a 0–3 loss at Charleston Battery.

Morris signed with USL Championship club Louisville City in January 2024.

== International ==
Morris has represented the United States at the U19 and U20 level.

== Personal life ==
He is the brother of Middlesbrough midfielder, Aidan Morris.

== Honors ==
Columbus Crew 2

- MLS Next Pro: 2022

Louisville City

- USL Players' Shield: 2024, 2025
