= Taylor Davila =

American soccer player (born 2000)

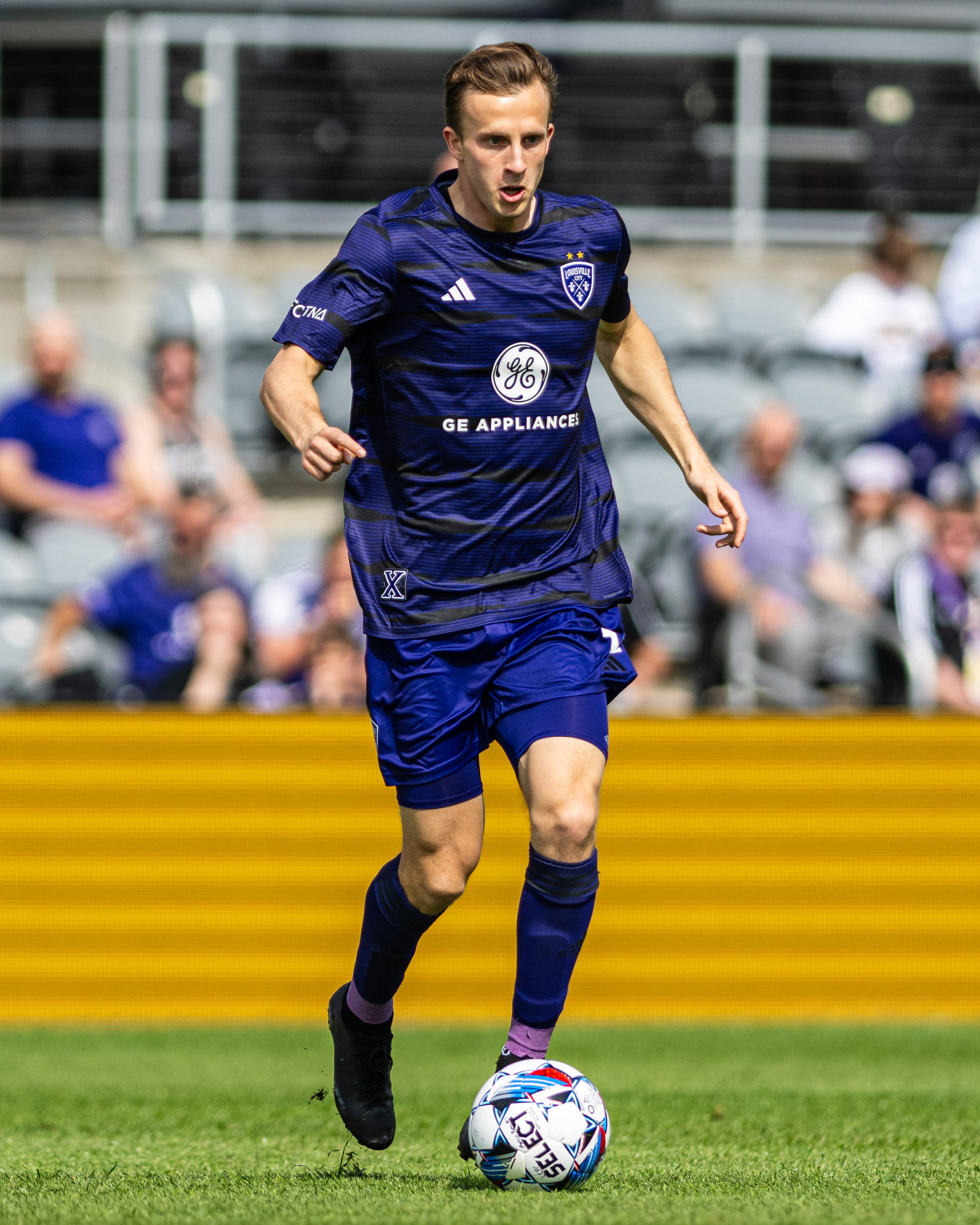
- Taylor Davila playing for Louisville City FC in 2024

Personal information
- Full name: Taylor Jacob Davila
- Date of birth: August 4, 2000 (age 26)
- Place of birth: Sherman Oaks, California, United States
- Height: 1.85 m (6 ft 1 in)
- Position: Midfielder

Team information
- Current team: Louisville City
- Number: 8

Youth career
- –2018: LA Galaxy

College career
Years	Team	Apps	(Gls)
2018–2020	California Golden Bears	36	(2)

Senior career*
Years	Team	Apps	(Gls)
2018	LA Galaxy II	1	(0)
2021–2022	LA Galaxy II	61	(4)
2023	Rio Grande Valley FC	34	(6)
2024–	Louisville City	92	(11)
- * Club domestic league appearances and goals as of November 7, 2026

Taylor Jacob Davila (born August 4, 2000) is an American professional soccer player who plays as a midfielder for USL Championship club Louisville City.

== Club career ==
Davila played with Real So Cal for most of his youth career before moving to the LA Galaxy academy and made an appearance for LA Galaxy II in the United Soccer League during their 2018 season.

Davila plays college soccer at the University of California, Berkeley from 2018 onward.

On February 11, 2021, Davila signed with USL Championship side LA Galaxy II. On February 15, 2023, Davila signed with USL Championship's Rio Grande Valley FC for their 2023 season.

Davila joined Louisville City of the USL Championship on January 16, 2024. Then on December 6, 2024 he signed a multi-year contract.

== Honors ==
=== Individual ===
- USL Championship All League First Team: 2023
- USL Championship All League First Team: 2024
- USL Championship Player of The Year Finalist: 2024
