= Amadou Dia =

American soccer player (born 1993)

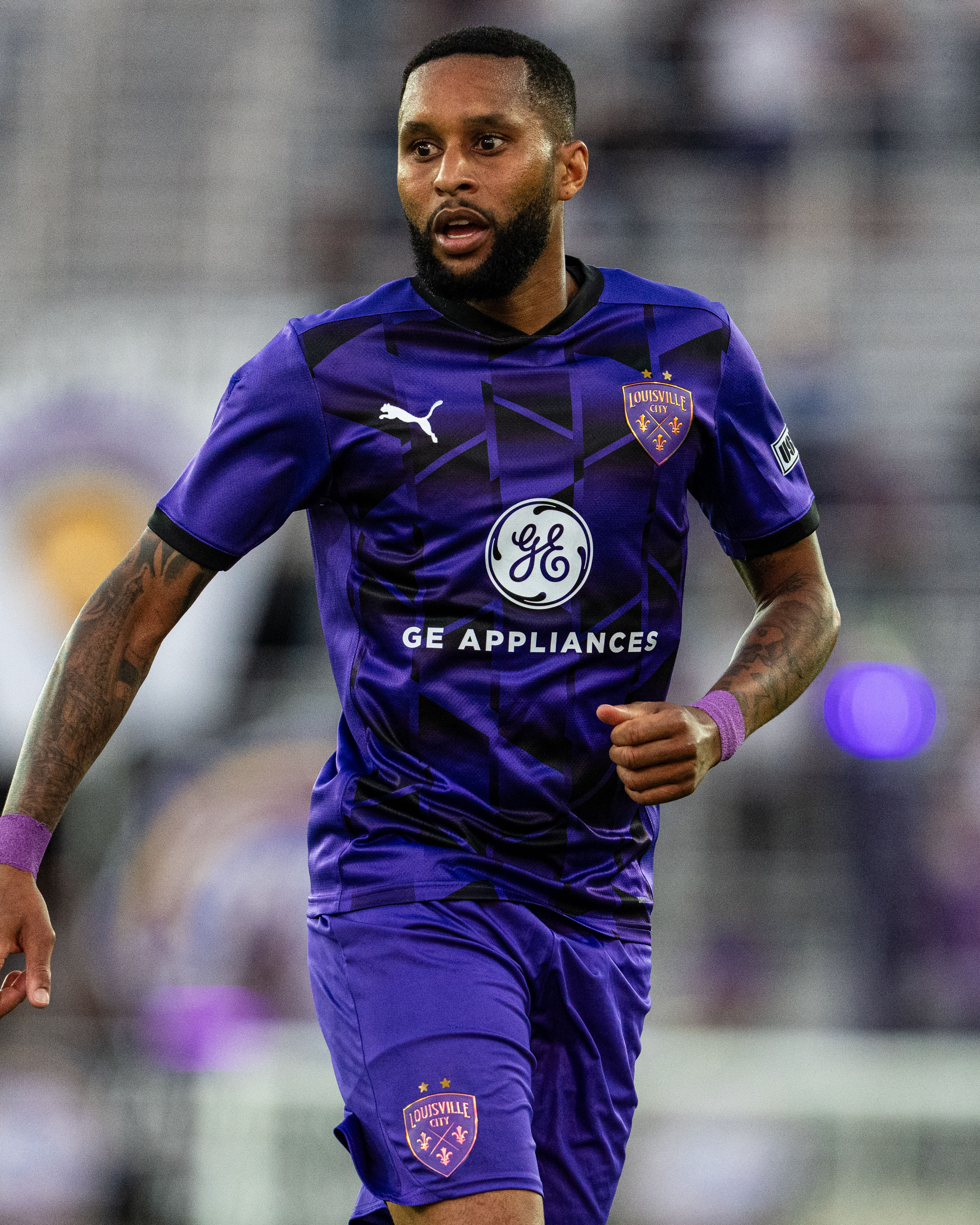
- Dia with Louisville City in 2025

Personal information
- Full name: Amadou Tidiane Dia
- Date of birth: June 8, 1993 (age 33)
- Place of birth: Nantes, France
- Height: 1.78 m (5 ft 10 in)
- Position: Left-back

Team information
- Current team: Louisville City
- Number: 13

Youth career
- 2007–2011: Real Colorado

College career
Years	Team	Apps	(Gls)
2011–2014	Clemson Tigers	70	(4)

Senior career*
Years	Team	Apps	(Gls)
2013–2014	Real Colorado Foxes	6	(1)
2015–2016	Sporting Kansas City	32	(0)
2016	→ Swope Park Rangers (loan)	3	(0)
2016	Montreal Impact	1	(0)
2017–2019	Phoenix Rising	83	(4)
2020–2021	Sporting Kansas City	16	(0)
2020–2021	Sporting Kansas City II	10	(0)
2022–	Louisville City	131	(4)

International career^{‡}
2010	United States U18	8	(0)
- * Club domestic league appearances and goals as of November 7, 2026 ‡ National team caps and goals as of March 9, 2015

Amadou Tidiane Dia (born June 8, 1993) is a professional soccer player who plays as a left-back for Louisville City in the USL Championship. Born in France, he has represented the United States at youth level.

== Early life ==
Dia was born in Nantes, France and moved to the United States at a young age, settling in California, before relocating to Highlands Ranch, Colorado. He holds both American and French nationalities. His parents were born in Senegal and Cape Verde.

== Career ==
=== College and amateur ===
Dia spent all four years of his college career at Clemson University where he made a total of 70 appearances for the Tigers and tallied four goals and four assists.

He also spent two seasons in the Premier Development League for Real Colorado Foxes.

=== Professional ===
Dia was drafted 20th overall in the 2015 MLS SuperDraft by Sporting Kansas City. He made his professional debut on March 8 against the New York Red Bulls. In July 2016, Dia was traded by Sporting Kansas City to the Montreal Impact in exchange for forward Cameron Porter. His option was declined following the 2016 season. Dia then signed with Phoenix Rising FC on June 9, 2017.

Dia returned to Sporting Kansas City in January 2020. Following the 2021 season, Dia's contract option was declined by Kansas City.

On January 14, 2022, Dia joined USL Championship club Louisville City.
