= Aiden McFadden =

American soccer player (born 1998)

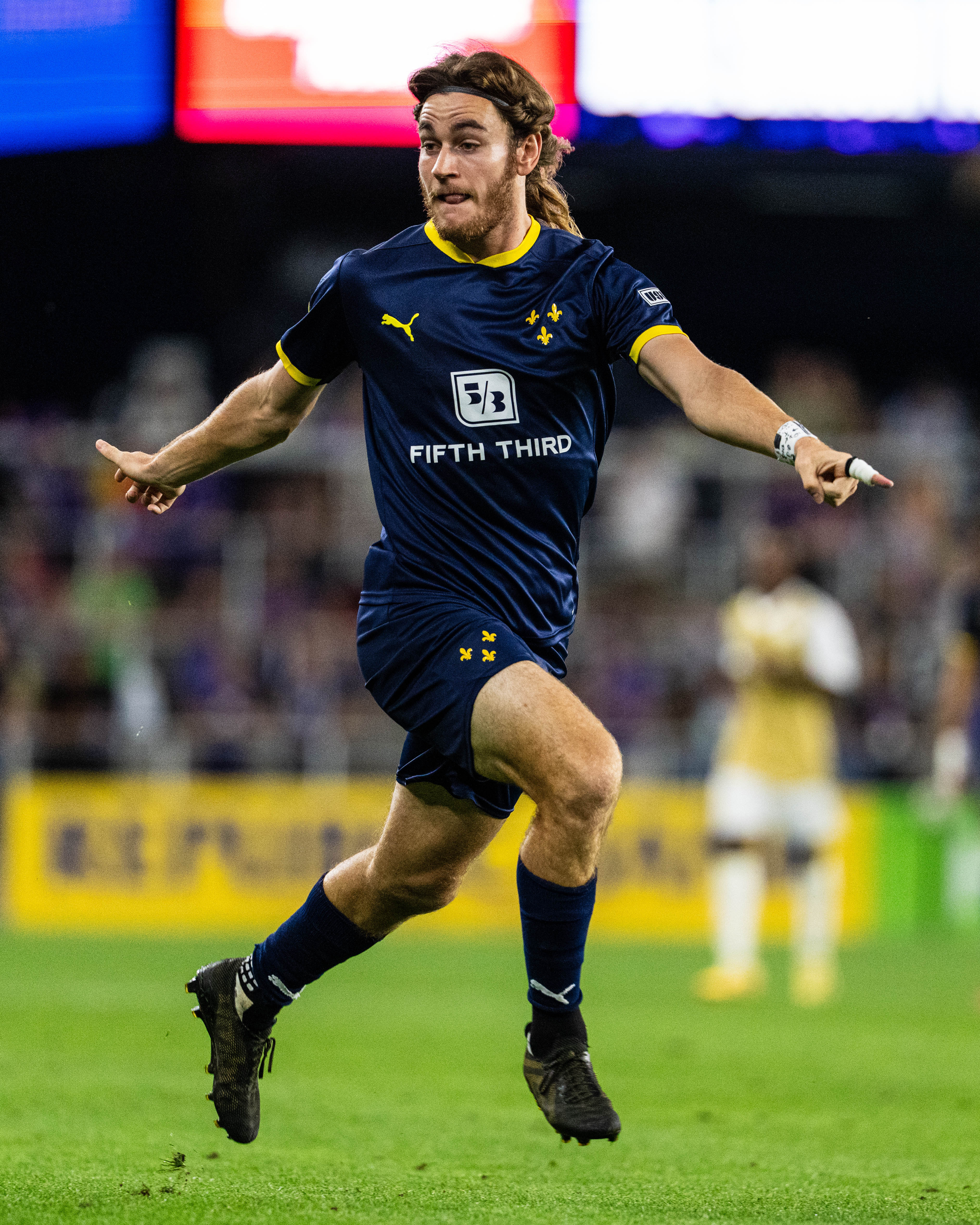
- McFadden with Louisville City in 2025

Personal information
- Date of birth: September 28, 1998 (age 28)
- Place of birth: West Chester, Pennsylvania, United States
- Height: 5 ft 10 in (1.78 m)
- Positions: Winger; full-back

Team information
- Current team: Louisville City
- Number: 2

Youth career
- Penn Fusion

College career
Years	Team	Apps	(Gls)
2017–2020	Notre Dame Fighting Irish	55	(8)

Senior career*
Years	Team	Apps	(Gls)
2018	West Chester United	6	(4)
2021–2023	Atlanta United 2	54	(9)
2022–2024	Atlanta United	11	(0)
2023	→ Memphis 901 (loan)	12	(1)
2024	→ Atlanta United 2 (loan)	1	(0)
2024	→ Louisville City (loan)	15	(2)
2024–	Louisville City	66	(8)
- * Club domestic league appearances and goals as of November 7, 2026

Aiden DeLee McFadden (born September 28, 1998) is an American professional soccer player who plays as a full-back for Louisville City in the USL Championship.

== Career ==
=== College and amateur ===
McFadden played four years of college soccer at University of Notre Dame between 2017 and 2020, although missing the 2017 season due to injury. During his time with the Fighting Irish, McFadden made 55 appearances, scoring 8 goals and tallying 6 assists.

In 2018, McFadden also appeared for NPSL side West Chester United.

=== Professional ===
On January 21, 2021, McFadden was selected 59th overall in the 2021 MLS SuperDraft by Atlanta United. On April 21, 2021, McFadden signed with Atlanta's USL Championship side Atlanta United 2. He made his debut on April 24, 2021, starting against Louisville City.

On March 5, 2022, McFadden was called up to the Atlanta United first team squad, and made a 90th-minute substitute appearance during a 0–3 loss to Colorado Rapids.

On July 8, 2022, McFadden moved permanently to the Atlanta first team roster. On April 5, 2024, McFadden made a season-long loan to USL Championship side Louisville City FC.
