= Ray Serrano =

American soccer player (born 2002)

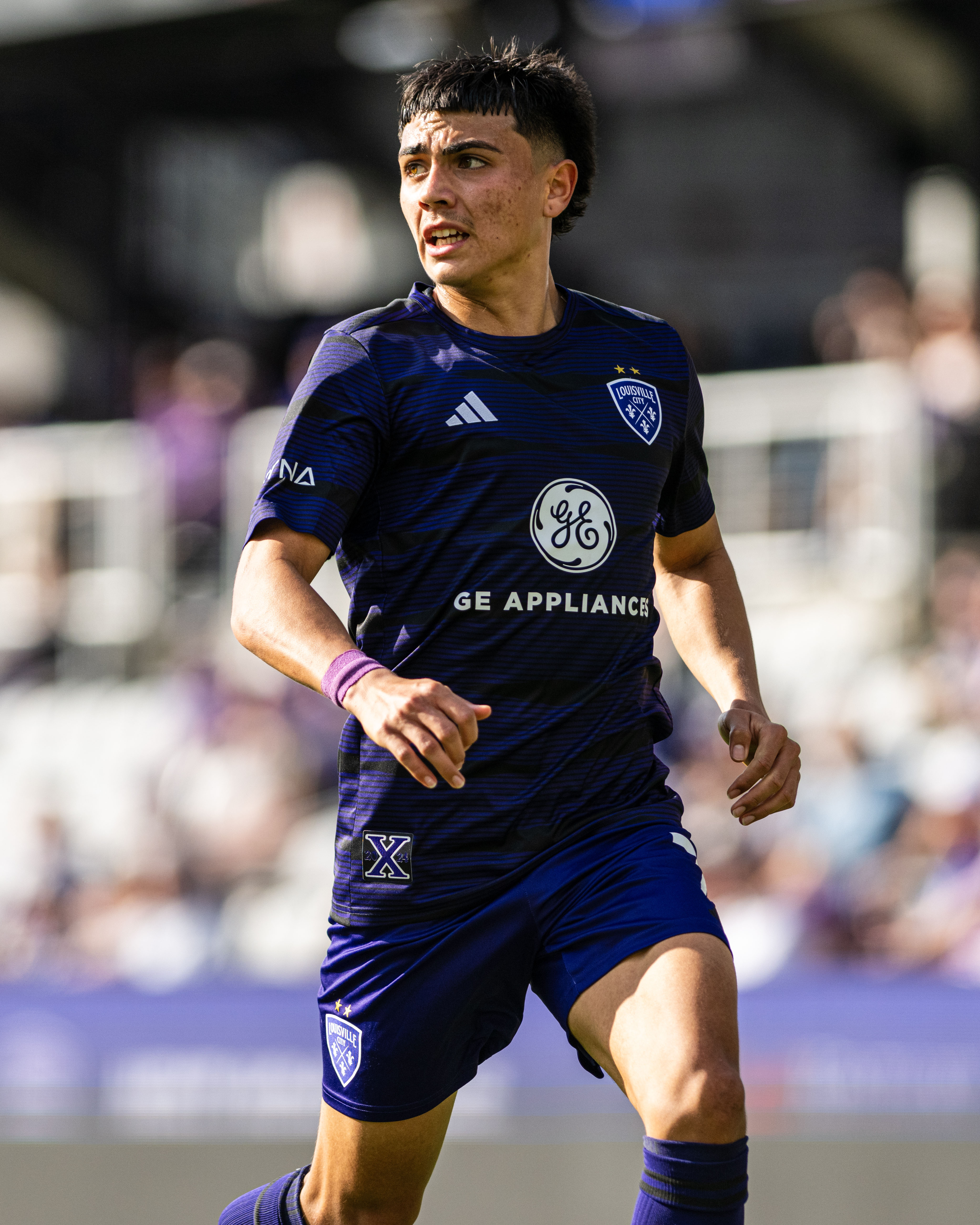
- Ray Serrano playing for Louisville City in 2024

Personal information
- Full name: Ray Serrano Lopez
- Date of birth: May 9, 2002 (age 24)
- Place of birth: Moses Lake, Washington, United States
- Height: 1.70 m (5 ft 7 in)
- Position: Attacking midfielder

Team information
- Current team: Louisville City
- Number: 7

Youth career
- 2018: Seattle

Senior career*
Years	Team	Apps	(Gls)
2018–2022	Tacoma Defiance	53	(7)
2022–	Louisville City	160	(26)

International career^{‡}
2017	United States U17	13	(0)
- * Club domestic league appearances and goals as of November 7, 2026 ‡ National team caps and goals as of December 3, 2017

Ray Serrano Lopez (born May 9, 2002) is an American professional soccer player who currently plays for Louisville City in the USL Championship.

== Career ==
Serrano who is of Mexican descent, began his youth career with Spokane Shadow in Washington before joining the Seattle Sounders FC academy in 2016.

On February 14, 2018, Serrano signed a professional contract with United Soccer League side Seattle Sounders FC 2. At the time of signing he was the youngest player in club history to sign a professional contract.

In 2019 Serrano was invited to Costa Rica for the U17 U.S national team camp

On January 26, 2022, Serrano signed with USL Championship side Louisville City.

== Honors ==
- USL Championship Young Player of the Year Finalist: 2024
