= 2019 Hartford Athletic season =

Hartford Athletic
2019 season
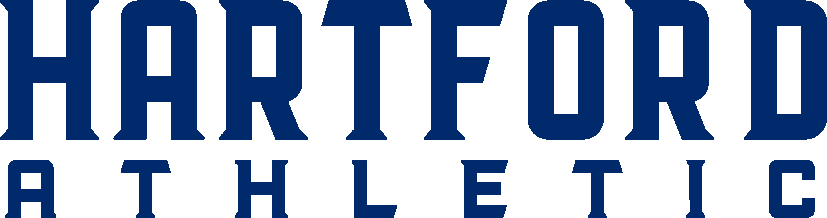
- Owner: Hartford Sports Group
- Head coach: Jimmy Nielsen
- Stadium: Rentschler Field (from May 4 to June 29); Dillon Stadium (from July 13); Al-Marzook Field (U.S. Open Cup)
- USL Championship: Conference: 17th
- USLC Playoffs: Did not qualify
- U.S. Open Cup: Third Round
- Top goalscorer: League: Wojciech Wojcik (7); All: Wojciech Wojcik (7)
- Highest home attendance: League/All: 11,346 (May 4 vs. Charlotte Independence)
- Lowest home attendance: League: 3,117 (July 20 vs. Charleston Battery); All: 400 (May 14 vs. New York Cosmos B (USOC))
- Average home league attendance: 5,025
- Biggest win: +4 goals (twice); 5–1 (September 7 vs. Loudoun United); 4–0 (October 9 vs. Birmingham Legion)
- Biggest defeat: –4 goals (6 times); 0–4 (April 6 at Tampa Bay Rowdies); 0–4 (April 17 at New York Red Bulls II); 0–4 (May 29 at Memphis, USOC R3); 0–4 (August 7 at Nashville SC); 1–5 (August 10 vs. New York Red Bulls II); 0–4 (September 28 at Charlotte)
Home colors	Away colors

The 2019 Hartford Athletic season was the club's inaugural season and their first in the USL Championship, the second tier of American soccer. The season covers the period from the founding of the club to the start of the 2020 USL Championship season.

== Roster ==
As of match played April 17, 2019

No.	Name	Nationality	Position(s)	Date of birth (age)	Signed in	Previous club	Apps.	Goals
Goalkeepers
1	Frederik Due	(Denmark)	GK	July 18, 1992 (age 34)	2019	(Denmark) Randers	24	0
16	Mike Novotny	(United States)	GK	March 17, 1996 (age 30)	2019	(Sweden) Stöde IF	0	0
18	Jacob Lissek	(United States)	GK	August 17, 1992 (age 34)	2019	(United States) Penn FC	9	0
Defenders
2	Kyle Curinga	(United States)	DF	December 30, 1993 (age 32)	2019	(United States) Tampa Bay Rowdies	22	0
3	Raymond Lee	(United States)	DF	April 26, 1993 (age 33)	2019	(United States) Pittsburgh Riverhounds SC	30	1
4	Sem de Wit	(Netherlands)	DF	March 30, 1995 (age 31)	2019	(United States) FC Cincinnati	33	1
26	Nikolaj Lyngø	(Denmark)	DF	February 3, 1998 (age 28)	2019	(Denmark) AaB	10	0
Midfielders
5	Tyler David	(United States)	MF	March 1, 1994 (age 32)	2019	(Finland) Bollklubben-46	6	0
8	Mads Jørgensen	(Denmark)	MF	July 5, 1998 (age 28)	2019	(Denmark) BK Marienlyst	25	3
10	Philip Rasmussen	(Denmark)	MF	January 12, 1989 (age 37)	2019	(United States) OKC Energy	19	2
14	Ryan Williams	(England)	MF	April 8, 1991 (age 35)	2019	(England) Tranmere Rovers	26	4
17	Jonathan Brown	(Wales)	MF	April 17, 1990 (age 36)	2019	(United States) OKC Energy	30	2
21	Nicky Downs	(United States)	MF	January 8, 1996 (age 30)	2019	(United States) Yale Bulldogs	23	0
23	Collin Martin	(United States)	MF	November 9, 1994 (age 32)	2019	(United States) Minnesota United FC (loan)	7	0
80	Danny Barrera	(Colombia)	MF	January 8, 1990 (age 30)	2019	(United States) Fresno FC	17	3
33	Harry Swartz	(United States)	MF	March 19, 1996 (age 23)	2019	Brazos Valley Cavalry	20	4
Forwards
7	Sebastian Dalgaard	(Denmark)	FW	August 23, 1991 (age 35)	2019	(Denmark) Middelfart G&BK	27	5
9	José Angulo	(Colombia)	FW	January 13, 1988 (age 38)	2019	(United States) OKC Energy	29	6
11	Alex Dixon	(United States)	FW	February 7, 1990 (age 36)	2019	(United States) OKC Energy	27	5
12	Wojciech Wojcik	(Poland)	FW	May 31, 1992 (age 34)	2019	(United States) New York Cosmos B	31	7
19	Mac Steeves	(United States)	FW	July 31, 1994 (age 32)	2019	(United States) Houston Dynamo	15	2
92	Giuseppe Gentile	(United States)	FW	October 18, 1992 (age 34)	2019	(United States) Richmond Kickers	13	0
Out on loan
15	Klisman Sousa	(Cape Verde)	DF	February 12, 1996 (age 30)	2019	(United States) Providence Friars	0	0
20	Scott DeVoss	(United States)	DF	February 26, 1996 (age 30)	2019	(United States) Denver Pioneers	0	0

== Non-competitive ==
=== Preseason ===
Although a preseason schedule was not officially announced ahead of time, Hartford played four preseason matches ahead of the club's inaugural season. After opening preseason in Farmington, Connecticut and playing a behind closed doors friendly against New York Red Bulls II, Hartford announced three matches to be played while the club trained in Melbourne, Florida. Hartford played matches against USL League One club Orlando City B, National Premier Soccer League club Miami FC, and collegiate program Eastern Florida State College.

February 15 Friendly	New York Red Bulls II	0–2	Hartford Athletic	New Jersey
		Report	Wojcik; Dixon	Attendance: 0

February 23 Friendly	Miami FC	3–2	Hartford Athletic	Melbourne, FL
4:00 PM EST	Thiaw 5', 67'; González 23'	Report	Dixon 15' (pen.), 18'	Stadium: Titan Soccer Complex

February 26 Friendly	Orlando City B	1–2	Hartford Athletic	Montverde, FL
	Goal	Report	Wojcik 25'; Angulo 90+3' (pen.)	Stadium: Montverde Academy

March 1 Friendly	Eastern Florida State Titans	1–2	Hartford Athletic	Melbourne, FL
	25'	Report	Dalgaard 39'; Angulo (pen.)	Stadium: Titan Soccer Complex

=== Exhibition ===
August 17 Friendly	Hartford Athletic	5–1	Puerto Rico	Hartford, CT
17:07 EST	Wojcik 25'; Davey (yellow card) 54'; Angulo 58'; Jørgensen 68'; Dalgaard 72'; Bedoya 86'	Report	Díaz 27'; Cardona (yellow card) 57'	Stadium: Dillon Stadium; Attendance: 4,685

October 26 Friendly	Hartford Athletic	1-2	(Jamaica) Portmore United F.C.	Hartford, CT
19:00 EST	Steeves 32'; Gentile (yellow card) 43'; David (yellow card) 90+1'	Report	Shaw (yellow card) 61'; Lewis 65'; Smith 70'	Stadium: Dillon Stadium

== Competitive ==
=== USL Championship ===
==== Standings ====
Pos	Team	Pld	W	D	L	GF	GA	GD	Pts
14	Atlanta United 2	34	9	8	17	45	77	−32	35
15	Memphis 901 FC	34	9	7	18	37	52	−15	34
16	Bethlehem Steel FC	34	8	7	19	49	78	−29	31
17	Hartford Athletic	34	8	5	21	49	80	−31	29
18	Swope Park Rangers	34	6	8	20	46	80	−34	26

Source: USL Championship Standings
Rules for classification: 1) total wins; 2) total goal differential; 3) total goals scored; 4) points earned against top four Conference finishers; 5) disciplinary points; 6) coin toss or drawing of lots

==== Results by round ====
Round	1	2	3	4	5	6	7	8	9	10	11	12	13	14	15	16	17	18	19	20	21	22	23	24	25	26	27	28	29	30	31	32	33	34
Stadium	A	A	A	A	A	A	A	A	H	H	A	H	H	H	H	A	H	A	H	A	H	H	A	A	H	H	A	H	H	A	A	H	H	H
Result	L	L	L	L	L	L	L	L	D	L	W	D	D	W	L	D	L	L	W	L	L	L	W	L	L	W	L	W	L	L	L	D	W	W

Source: Hartford schedule
A = Away; H = Home; W = Win; D = Draw; L = Loss

==== Match results ====
The league announced home openers for every club on December 14, 2018. The inaugural home match in Hartford Athletic history was scheduled for May 4, with the club facing Charlotte Independence; although it was initially anticipated that the game would be played at Dillon Stadium, it and six other home matches were later moved to Rentschler Field due to construction delays. Hartford were to take part in the home openers for four other clubs, facing Atlanta United 2 on March 9, Louisville City on March 23, Indy Eleven on March 30, and Pittsburgh Riverhounds SC on April 13.

Hartford Athletic's full schedule was released on December 19. The club's inaugural season will consist of 34 league matches, including home and away games against every Eastern Conference opponent. Hartford will be one of six new teams in the Eastern Conference: Birmingham Legion, Loudoun United, and Memphis 901 are also joining as expansion clubs, while Saint Louis FC and Swope Park Rangers move over from the Western Conference.

March 9 1	Atlanta United 2	2–0	Hartford Athletic	Kennesaw, GA
7:30 PM EST	Gallagher 30'; Vazquez 80'; Conway (yellow card) 90+1'	Report	David (yellow card) 72'	Stadium: Fifth Third Bank Stadium; Attendance: 2,037; Referee: Gustavo Solorio

March 16 2	Charleston Battery	2–1	Hartford Athletic	Charleston, SC
7:30 PM EDT	Lewis 17'; Woodbine (yellow card) 49'; Marini 73', (yellow card) 90'	Report	Rasmussen (yellow card) 52', (goal) 83' (pen.)	Stadium: MUSC Health Stadium; Attendance: 2,044; Referee: Rosendo Mendoza

March 23 3	Louisville City	2–1	Hartford Athletic	Louisville, KY
7:00 PM EDT	Spencer 14', (yellow card) 90'; de Wit 33' (o.g.)	Report	Lyngø (yellow card) 4'; Brown 6'; Jørgensen (yellow card) 67'; de Wit (yellow card) 90+4'	Stadium: Louisville Slugger Field; Attendance: 8,561; Referee: Charles Murphy

March 30 4	Indy Eleven	1–0	Hartford Athletic	Indianapolis, IN
7:00 PM EDT	Lyngø 40' (o.g.); Ayoze (yellow card) 58'; Gibson (yellow card) 63'; Matern (yellow card) 69'	Report		Stadium: Lucas Oil Stadium; Attendance: 20,251; Referee: Lukasz Szpala

April 6 5	Tampa Bay Rowdies	4–0	Hartford Athletic	St. Petersburg, FL
7:30 PM EDT	Guenzatti 37', 78'; Najem 58'; Diakité (yellow card) 67'; Tinari 71'	Report	Williams (yellow card) 73'; de Wit (yellow card) 86'	Stadium: Al Lang Stadium; Attendance: 4,360; Referee: Thomas Snyder

April 13 6	Pittsburgh Riverhounds SC	3–1	Hartford Athletic	Pittsburgh, PA
7:00 PM EDT	Dos Santos 14'; Kerr 74'; Brett 81' (pen.)	Report	Curinga (yellow card) 44'; David (yellow card) 50'; Angulo 54'; Lyngø (yellow card) 64'	Stadium: Highmark Stadium; Attendance: 5,182; Referee: Austin Saini

April 17 7	New York Red Bulls II	4–0	Hartford Athletic	Montclair, NJ
7:00 PM EDT	Zajec (yellow card) 17'; Stroud 53'; Barlow 64'; Etienne 71'; Lema 89'	Report	de Wit (yellow card) 40'	Stadium: MSU Soccer Park at Pittser Field; Attendance: 721; Referee: Lorant Varga

April 27 8	North Carolina FC	4–1	Hartford Athletic	Cary, NC
7:00 PM EDT	Lomis 5'; Brotherton 45+2', (yellow card) 52'; Miller 47'; Kristo 81'	Report	Gentile (yellow card) 41'; Dixon 58'; Curinga (yellow card) 90+2'	Stadium: Sahlen's Stadium; Attendance: 5,097; Referee: Gabriele Giusti

May 4 9	Hartford Athletic	1–1	Charlotte Independence	East Hartford, CT
7:00 PM EDT	Steeves 12'; Martin (yellow card) 79'	Report	Mansally 3'; Maria (yellow card) 39'; Jones (yellow card) 90+1'	Stadium: Rentschler Field; Attendance: 11,346; Referee: David Barrie

May 10 10	Hartford Athletic	1–2	Memphis 901	East Hartford, CT
7:00 PM EDT	Lee 31'	Report	Muckette 24'; Metzger (yellow card) 29'; Charpie (yellow card) 36'; Collier 70'	Stadium: Rentschler Field; Attendance: 5,045; Referee: Lukasz Szpala

May 19 11	Loudoun United	1–2	Hartford Athletic	Washington, D.C.
7:30 PM EDT	Villatoro (yellow card) 31'; Lyngø 64' (o.g.); Campos (yellow card) 88'	Report	Angulo 59', 68'; Gentile (yellow card) 90+2'	Stadium: Audi Field; Referee: Eric Tattersall

May 25 12	Hartford Athletic	1–1	Ottawa Fury FC	East Hartford, CT
7:00 PM EDT	Martin (yellow card) 45+1'; Dalgaard 47' de Wit (yellow card) 60'	Report	Samb 22'; Fall (yellow card) 49'; Mannella (yellow card) 64'	Stadium: Rentschler Field; Attendance: 5,346; Referee: Lorant Varga

June 1 13	Hartford Athletic	1–1	North Carolina FC	East Hartford, CT
7:00 PM EDT	Swartz 1'; Curinga (yellow card) 23'; Lee (yellow card) 57'	Report	Chester 58'; Guillén (yellow card) 61'	Stadium: Rentschler Field; Attendance: 5,003; Referee: Mark Allatin

June 8 14	Hartford Athletic	2–1	Saint Louis FC	East Hartford, CT
7:00 PM EDT	Swartz 27'; Rasmussen 85' (pen.); Downs (yellow card) 86'	Report	Bahner 16'; Abend (yellow card) 79'	Stadium: Rentschler Field; Attendance: 5,132; Referee: John Griggs

June 16 15	Hartford Athletic	2–3	Nashville SC	East Hartford, CT
3:00 PM EDT	Dalgaard 32' de Wit 58'; Gdula (yellow card) 90+4'	Report	Ríos 31', (yellow card) 88'; Moloto 62'; Lancaster 85'	Stadium: Rentschler Field; Attendance: 4,489; Referee: Luis Arroyo

June 22 16	Birmingham Legion	2–2	Hartford Athletic	Birmingham, AL
8:00 PM EDT	Kobayashi (yellow card) 26'; Hoffman 31'; Fisher (yellow card) 42'; Lopez 52'; Turner (yellow card) 77'	Report	Swartz 14'; Gdula 43'; Jørgenson (yellow card) 62'; Rasmussen (yellow card) 89'; Curinga (yellow card) 90+7'	Stadium: BBVA Compass Field; Attendance: 4,609; Referee: Eric Tattersall

June 28 17	Hartford Athletic	0–3	Bethlehem Steel FC	East Hartford, CT
7:30 PM EDT	Lyngø (yellow card) 90+4'	Report	Moumbagna 17', (yellow card) 52'; Rayyan 37'; Harriel (yellow card) 55'; Borgelin (yellow card) 90'; Cortes 90+1'	Stadium: Rentschler Field; Attendance: 5,012; Referee: Lukasz Szpala

July 6 18	Memphis 901	4–1	Hartford Athletic	Memphis, TN
8:30 PM EDT	Collier 6', 11', 75'; Metzger (yellow card) 50'; Burch (yellow card) 57'; Morton (yellow card) 67'; Kunga 80'	Report	Downs (yellow card) 8' de Wit (yellow card) 20'; Jørgenson 30', (yellow card) 90'; Swartz (yellow card) 53'; Dixon (yellow card) 57'	Stadium: AutoZone Park; Attendance: 6,726; Referee: Gabriele Giusti

July 13 19	Hartford Athletic	2–1	Indy Eleven	Hartford, CT
7:00 PM EDT	Angulo 58'; Wojcik 72'	Report	Ayoze 88' (pen.); Hackshaw (yellow card) 89'	Stadium: Dillon Stadium; Attendance: 5,500; Referee: Sergii Demianchuk

July 17 20	Swope Park Rangers	4–3	Hartford Athletic	Kansas City, KS
8:00 PM EDT	Hernandez 7'; Rowe 27', 30', (yellow card) 63'; Freeman 50'; Karani (yellow card) 61'; Riley (yellow card) 64'; Segbers (yellow card) 75'	Report	Barrera (yellow card) 45+2'; Riley 46' (o.g.); Dixon 58'; Davey (yellow card) 69'; Curinga (yellow card) 71'; Steeves 74'; Rasmussen (yellow card) 90+3'	Stadium: Children's Mercy Park; Attendance: 521; Referee: Kevin Broadley

July 20 21	Hartford Athletic	2–3	Charleston Battery	Hartford, CT
7:00 PM EDT	Davey (yellow card) 39'; Wojcik 57'; Jørgenson 65' de Wit (yellow card) 71'; Barrera (yellow card) 90'	Report	Lewis 40'; Bosua (yellow card) 69'; Guerra 79'; Marini 80'	Stadium: Dillon Stadium; Attendance: 3,117; Referee: Adam Kilpatrick

July 27 22	Hartford Athletic	2–4	Pittsburgh Riverhounds SC	Hartford, CT
7:00 PM EDT	Jørgenson 47', (yellow card) 90+4'; Dalgaard 84'	Report	Dos Santos 13'; Velarde 37'; Curinga 38' (o.g.); Brett 76'	Stadium: Dillon Stadium; Attendance: 4,606; Referee: Calin Radosav

August 1 23	Bethlehem Steel FC	0–3	Hartford Athletic	Chester, PA
5:00 PM EDT	Mbaizo (yellow card) 31'; Ofeimu (yellow card) 38' (yellow-red card) 76'; Zandi (yellow card) 63'; Turner (yellow card) 67'	Report	Due (yellow card) 23'; Curinga (yellow card) 24'; Bedoya 28'; Dixon 50'; Wojcik 84'	Stadium: Talen Energy Stadium; Attendance: 325; Referee: Danielle Chesky

August 7 24	Nashville SC	4–0	Hartford Athletic	Nashville, TN
8:00 PM EDT	Tribbett 51'; Ríos 56'; Winn 64'; Lee 69' (o.g.)	Report	Jørgenson (red card) 5'; Dixon (yellow card) 53'	Stadium: First Tennessee Park; Attendance: 5,796; Referee: Eric Tattersall

August 10 25	Hartford Athletic	1–5	New York Red Bulls II	Hartford, CT
1:00 PM EDT	Gdula (yellow card) 20'; Dalgaard 31'; Davey (red card) 53'; Lee (red card) 53'; Dixon (yellow card) 67'	Report	Bezecourt (penalty missed) 57', 81'; Elney 64'; Nealis 75'; Stroud 82'; Löbe 90+2'	Stadium: Dillon Stadium; Attendance: 4,262; Referee: Elton García

August 24 26	Hartford Athletic	3–2	Atlanta United 2	Hartford, CT
7:00 PM EDT	Williams 27' (pen.); Wojcik 77', 89', (yellow card) 90'; Barrera (yellow card) 81'	Report	Wyke (yellow card) 50'; Carleton 57', (red card) 85'; Vazquez 59'	Stadium: Dillon Stadium; Attendance: 4,810; Referee: Lorant Varga

September 1 27	Saint Louis FC	3–2	Hartford Athletic	Fenton, MO
8:30 PM EDT	Darces 16'; Greig 38', 65'; Reynolds (yellow card) 59'; Bahner (yellow card) 71'	Report	Reynolds 29' (o.g.); Dalgaard 67'; Barrera (yellow card) 75'; Angulo (red card) 90+6'	Stadium: Toyota Stadium; Attendance: 4,068; Referee: Lukasz Szpala

September 7 28	Hartford Athletic	5–1	Loudoun United	Hartford, CT
7:00 PM EDT	Barrera 5'; Dixon 7', 32'; Williams 10'; Swartz 40'; Jørgensen (yellow card) 54'	Report	Wild 21'; Garay (red card) 51'; Lubahn (yellow card) 62'	Stadium: Dillon Stadium; Attendance: 4,582; Referee: Elvis Osmanovic

September 14 29	Hartford Athletic	0–1	Louisville City	Hartford, CT
7:00 PM EDT	de Wit (yellow card) 69'; Barrera (yellow card) 82'; Dixon (yellow card) 90+2'	Report	Matsoso 59'; Thiam (yellow card) 65'; Craig (yellow card) 71'; Ownby (yellow card) 90+3'	Stadium: Dillon Stadium; Attendance: 4,742; Referee: Matthew Franz

September 22 30	Ottawa Fury FC	4–1	Hartford Athletic	Ottawa, ON
2:00 PM EDT	Barry 2' (pen.), 16' (pen.), 66'; François 18'; Mannella (yellow card) 71'	Report	Angulo 65'	Stadium: TD Place Stadium; Attendance: 5,505; Referee: Filip Dujic

September 28 31	Charlotte Independence	4–0	Hartford Athletic	Matthews, NC
7:00 PM EDT	Bocanegra (yellow card) 26', (goal) 75'; George (yellow card) 55'; A. Martínez 60'; Mansally (yellow card) 64'; E. Martínez 74' (pen.), 90+3'	Report	Barrera (yellow card) 59'	Stadium: Sportsplex at Matthews; Attendance: 2,319; Referee: Tori Penso

October 5 32	Hartford Athletic	2–2	Swope Park Rangers	Hartford, CT
7:00 PM EDT	Swartz (yellow card) 45'; Lee (yellow card) 45+2'; Williams 57'; Barrera 62'; Gdula (yellow card) 83'; Downs (yellow card) 89'; Gentile (yellow card) 90+4'	Report	Zé Pedro (yellow card) 31'; Harris (yellow card) 33', (goal) 90+7'; Lepley (yellow card) 41'; Allach 67'	Stadium: Dillon Stadium; Attendance: 5,012; Referee: Jonathan Bilinski

October 9 33	Hartford Athletic	4–0	Birmingham Legion	Hartford, CT
8:00 PM EDT	Angulo 56'; Bedoya 62' de Wit (yellow card) 74'; Barrera 81'; Wojcik 86'	Report	Lopez (yellow card) 70'	Stadium: Dillon Stadium; Attendance: 2,746; Referee: Ismir Pekmic

October 19 34	Hartford Athletic	2–1	Tampa Bay Rowdies	Hartford, CT
7:00 PM EDT	Williams (yellow card) 40', (goal) 47'; Gdula (yellow card) 62'; Wojcik 90+3'	Report	Johnson (yellow card) 62' (yellow-red card) 68'; Mkosana 73'; Diakité (yellow card) 80'	Stadium: Dillon Stadium; Attendance: 4,674; Referee: Sergii Demianchuk

=== U.S. Open Cup ===
As a member of the USL Championship, Hartford Athletic will enter the tournament in the second round, to be played May 14–15, 2019.

May 14 Second round	Hartford Athletic (Connecticut)	2–1	(New York (state)) New York Cosmos B	West Hartford, CT
7:30 PM EDT	Swartz 16'; Jörgensen 25'; Wojcik (yellow card) 34'; Gentile (yellow card) 74'	Report	Dennis (yellow card) 24'; Bardic 57'	Stadium: Al-Marzook Field; Attendance: 400; Referee: T. Snyder

May 29 Third round	Memphis 901 FC (Tennessee)	4–0	(Connecticut) Hartford Athletic	Memphis, TN
7:00 pm CDT	Burch 6' (pen.); Graf 21', 59'; Lindley (yellow card) 45'; Hackworth 83'	Report	Curinga (yellow card) 19' de Wit (yellow card) 39' (yellow-red card) 61'	Stadium: Mike Rose Soccer Complex; Attendance: 1,819; Referee: Leland Grant

== Statistics ==
=== Appearances and goals ===
No.	Pos	Nat	Player	Total		USLC		U.S. Open Cup	
No.	Pos	Nat	Player	Apps	Goals	Apps	Goals	Apps	Goals
2	DF	(United States) USA	Kyle Curinga	24	0	19+3	0	2	0
3	DF	(United States) USA	Raymond Lee	32	1	30	1	2	0
4	DF	(Netherlands) NED	Sem de Wit	35	1	33	1	2	0
5	MF	(United States) USA	Tyler David	6	0	6	0	0	0
7	FW	(Denmark) DEN	Sebastian Dalgaard	28	5	24+3	5	+1	0
8	MF	(Denmark) DEN	Mads Jørgensen	27	4	23+2	3	1+1	1
9	FW	(Colombia) COL	José Angulo	30	6	21+8	6	1	0
10	MF	(Denmark) DEN	Philip Rasmussen	20	2	15+4	2	1	0
11	FW	(United States) USA	Alex Dixon	28	5	21+6	5	1	0
12	FW	(United States) USA	Wojciech Wojcik	33	7	11+20	7	1+1	0
14	MF	(England) ENG	Ryan Williams	27	4	19+7	4	1	0
15	DF	(Cape Verde) CPV	Klisman Sousa	0	0	0	0	0	0
16	GK	(United States) USA	Mike Novotny	0	0	0	0	0	0
17	MF	(Wales) WAL	Jonathan Brown	32	1	22+8	1	1+1	0
18	GK	(United States) USA	Jacob Lissek	11	0	8+1	0	2	0
19	FW	(United States) USA	Mac Steeves	16	2	5+10	2	+1	0
20	DF	(United States) USA	Scott DeVoss	0	0	0	0	0	0
21	MF	(United States) USA	Nicky Downs	25	0	11+12	0	2	0
23	MF	(United States) USA	Collin Martin	7	0	7	0	0	0
33	MF	(United States) USA	Harry Swartz	21	5	20	4	1	1
33	DF	(England) ENG	Alex Davey	13	0	11+2	0	0	0
24	DF	(United States) USA	Logan Gdula	16	1	14+1	1	1	0
22	GK	(United States) USA	Cody Cropper	9	0	9			
80	MF	(Colombia) COL	Danny Barrera	17	3	16+1	3	0	0
92	FW	(United States) USA	Giuseppe Gentile	13	0	3+10	0	0	0
Players who left Hartford during the season:
6	MF	(United States) USA	Luis Argudo	2	0	2	0	0	0
26	DF	(Denmark) DEN	Nikolaj Lyngø	11	0	8+2	0	1	0
22	GK	(United States) USA	Jon Kempin	2	0	2	0	0	0
1	GK	(Denmark) DEN	Frederik Due	15	0	15	0	0	0

Source: Hartford stats

=== Disciplinary record ===
No.	Pos.	Name	USLC		U.S. Open Cup		Total	
No.	Pos.	Name	Yellow card	Red card	Yellow card	Red card	Yellow card	Red card
2	DF	(United States) Kyle Curinga	6	0	1	0	7	0
4	DF	(Netherlands) Sem de Wit	8	0	2	0	10	0
5	MF	(United States) Tyler David	2	0	0	0	2	0
8	MF	(Denmark) Mads Jørgensen	5	1	0	0	5	1
10	MF	(Denmark) Philip Rasmussen	3	0	0	0	3	0
26	DF	(Denmark) Nikolaj Lyngø	2	0	0	0	2	0
9	CF	(Colombia) Jose Angulo	0	1	0	0	0	1
30	LB	(United States) Raymond Lee	2	1	0	0	2	1
26	CB	(England) Alex Davey	2	1	0	0	2	1
80	MF	(Colombia) Danny Barrera	6	0	0	0	6	0
11	FW	(United States) Alex Dixon	4	0	0	0	4	0
24	DF	(United States) Logan Gdula	4	0	0	0	4	0
21	MF	(United States) Nicky Downs	3	0	0	0	3	0
92	FW	(United States) Giuseppe Gentile	3	0	0	0	3	0
26	DF	(United States) Nikolaj Lyngø	3	0	0	0	3	0
14	MF	(England) Ryan Williams	2	0	0	0	2	0
3	DF	(United States) Raymond Lee	2	0	0	0	2	0
33	MF	(United States) Harry Swartz	2	0	0	0	2	0
5	MF	(United States) Tyler David	2	0	0	0	2	0
23	MF	(United States) Collin Martin	2	0	0	0	2	0
12	FW	(Poland) Wojciech Wojcik	1	0	0	0	1	0
1	GK	(Denmark) Frederik Due	1	0	0	0	1	0

Source: Hartford stats

=== Clean sheets ===
No.	Name	USLC	U.S. Open Cup	Total	Games Played		
No.	Name	22	(United States) Cody Cropper	1	0	1	9
16	(United States) Mike Novotny	0	0	0	0		
18	(United States) Jacob Lissek	0	0	0	9		
Players who left Hartford during the season:
22	(United States) Jon Kempin	0	0	0	2		
1	(Denmark) Frederik Due	1	0	1	15		

Source: Hartford stats

== Transfers ==
=== In ===
Pos.	Player	Transferred from	Fee/notes	Date	Source
FW	(Colombia) José Angulo	(United States) OKC Energy	Signed to a one-year contract.	Dec 18, 2018	
FW	(United States) Alex Dixon	(United States) OKC Energy	Signed to a one-year contract.	Dec 18, 2018	
FW	(Poland) Wojciech Wojcik	(United States) New York Cosmos B	Signed to a one-year contract.	Dec 18, 2018	
FW	(Denmark) Sebastian Dalgaard	(Denmark) Middelfart G&BK	Signed to a one-year contract.	Jan 3, 2019	
DF	(Netherlands) Sem de Wit	(United States) FC Cincinnati	Signed to a one-year contract.	Jan 3, 2019	
MF	(Denmark) Mads Jørgensen	(Denmark) BK Marienlyst	Signed to a one-year contract.	Jan 3, 2019	
MF	(Denmark) Philip Rasmussen	(United States) OKC Energy	Signed to a one-year contract.	Jan 3, 2019	
MF	(United States) Nicky Downs	(United States) Yale Bulldogs	Signed to a one-year contract.	Jan 17, 2019	
DF	(United States) Raymond Lee	(United States) Pittsburgh Riverhounds SC	Signed to a one-year contract.	Jan 17, 2019	
DF	(Denmark) Nikolaj Lyngø	(Denmark) AaB	Signed to a one-year contract.	Jan 17, 2019	
FW	(United States) Mac Steeves	(United States) Houston Dynamo	Signed to a one-year contract.	Jan 17, 2019	
GK	(Denmark) Frederik Due	(Denmark) Randers	Signed to a one-year contract.	Jan 23, 2019	
FW	(United States) Giuseppe Gentile	(United States) Richmond Kickers	Signed to a one-year contract.	Jan 23, 2019	
MF	(Wales) Jonathan Brown	(United States) OKC Energy	Signed to a one-year contract.	Jan 30, 2019	
DF	(United States) Kyle Curinga	(United States) Tampa Bay Rowdies	Signed to a one-year contract.	Jan 30, 2019	
MF	(United States) Tyler David	(Finland) Bollklubben-46	Signed to a one-year contract.	Jan 30, 2019	
GK	(United States) Jacob Lissek	(United States) Penn FC	Signed to a one-year contract.	Jan 30, 2019	
GK	(United States) Mike Novotny	(Sweden) Stöde IF	Signed to a one-year contract.	Jan 30, 2019	
DF	(Cape Verde) Klisman Sousa	(United States) Providence Friars	Signed to a one-year contract.	Feb 21, 2019	
MF	(England) Ryan Williams	(England) Tranmere Rovers	Signed to a one-year contract.	Feb 21, 2019	
DF	(United States) Scott DeVoss	(United States) Denver Pioneers	Terms of the contract were undisclosed.	Mar 2, 2019	

=== Loan in ===
Pos.	Player	Parent club	Length/Notes	Beginning	End	Source
MF	(United States) Luis Argudo	(United States) Columbus Crew SC	On a match-by-match basis.	April 11, 2019	Apr 23, 2019	
GK	(United States) Jon Kempin	(United States) Columbus Crew SC	On a match-by-match basis.	April 11, 2019	Apr 23, 2019	
MF	(United States) Collin Martin	(United States) Minnesota United FC	Duration of the 2019 USL Championship season.	Apr 23, 2019	Oct 25, 2019	
GK	(United States) Cody Cropper	(United States) New England Revolution	Remainder of the season	Aug 16, 2019	Oct 27, 2019	
DF	(United States) Logan Gdula	(United States) FC Cincinnati	Remainder of the season	May 18, 2019	Oct 27, 2019	

=== Loan out ===
Pos.	Player	Loanee club	Length/Notes	Beginning	End	Source
DF	(Cape Verde) Klisman Sousa	(United States) FC Tucson	Duration of the 2019 USL League One season.	Apr 11, 2019	Oct 27, 2019	
DF	(United States) Scott DeVoss	(United States) FC Tucson	Duration of the 2019 USL League One season.	Apr 11, 2019	Oct 27, 2019	

== Awards ==
=== USLC Goal of the Week ===
Week	Player	Opponent	Link
6	(Colombia) José Angulo	Pittsburgh Riverhounds SC	

== Kits ==
Home	Away	Charity Alternate

Type	Shirt	Shorts	Socks	First appearance / Record
Home	Green	Green	Green	Match 3 vs. Louisville / 5–4–7
Away	White	White	White	Match 1 vs. Atlanta / 2–1–14
Charity; Alternate	Orange	Orange	Orange	Match 28 vs. Loudoun / 1-0-0

== See also ==
- Hartford Athletic
- 2019 in American soccer
- 2019 USL Championship season
