= 2019 Louisville City FC season =

Louisville City
2019 season
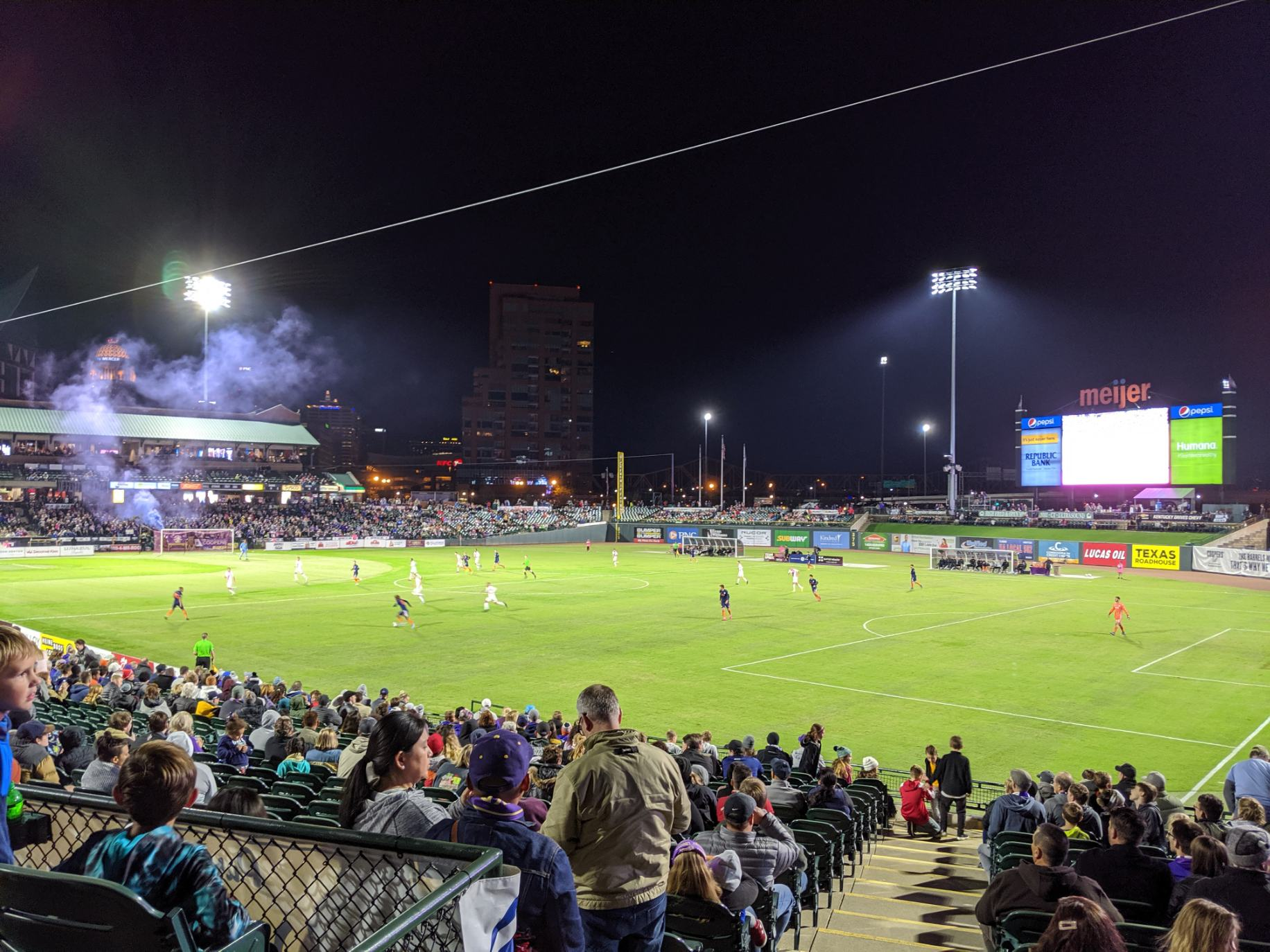
- Owner: John Neace
- Manager: John Hackworth
- Stadium: Louisville Slugger Field
- USL: Eastern Conf.: 4th
- U.S. Open Cup: Fourth Round
- USL Playoffs: Runner-Up
- Top goalscorer: League: Magnus Rasmussen (13 goals); All: Magnus Rasmussen (16 goals)
- Highest home attendance: League/All: 12,188 (October 12 vs. Swope Park Rangers)
- Lowest home attendance: League: 6,811 (April 6 vs. Pittsburgh Riverhounds); All: 1,403 (May 29 vs. Birmingham Legion FC (USOC))
- Average home league attendance: 9,041
- Biggest win: 8–3 (October 12 vs. Swope Park Rangers)
- Biggest defeat: 1–4 (March 9 vs. North Carolina FC)
Home colors	Away colors	Third colors

The 2019 Louisville City FC season was the club's fifth season in Louisville, Kentucky playing in the United Soccer League Championship, which as of 2019 is the second-tier league in the United States soccer league system.

It was Louisville City's final season at Louisville Slugger Field, a baseball park in downtown Louisville. The team opened the new Lynn Family Stadium in the nearby Butchertown neighborhood for the 2020 season.

== Current squad ==
As of June 29, 2019

No.	Position	Nation	Player
1	GK	USA	Tim Dobrowolski
2	DF	USA	Taylor Peay
3	DF	FRA	Alexis Souahy
4	DF	USA	Sean Totsch
5	DF	ENG	Paco Craig
7	MF	DEN	Magnus Rasmussen
8	DF	USA	Akil Watts
9	FW	GER	Luke Spencer
10	MF	USA	Brian Ownby
11	MF	IRL	Niall McCabe
12	FW	LES	Sunny Jane
13	GK	USA	Chris Hubbard
14	FW	SEN	Abdou Mbacke Thiam
15	DF	USA	Pat McMahon
16	MF	USA	Geoffrey Dee
19	MF	USA	Oscar Jimenez
21	DF	JAM	Shaun Francis
22	MF	USA	George Davis IV
23	FW	USA	Richard Ballard
27	MF	LES	Napo Matsoso
29	FW	FRA	Antoine Hoppenot
30	GK	USA	Casey Clark
36	MF	USA	Paolo DelPiccolo
39	GK	GER	Ben Lundt (on loan from FC Cincinnati)
61	MF	USA	Elijah Wynder
80	MF	JAM	Devon Williams

USL Academy Contract

== Transfers ==
=== In ===
No.	Pos.	Player	Transferred from	Fee/notes	Date	Source
2	DF	(United States) Taylor Peay	(United States) Real Monarchs	Free Transfer	December 11, 2018	
12	FW	(Lesotho) Sunny Jane	(Cambodia) Phnom Penh Crown FC	Free Transfer	December 19, 2018	
14	FW	(Senegal) Abdou Mbacke Thiam	(United States) University of Connecticut	Free Transfer	January 15, 2019	
77	FW	(Zimbabwe) Lucky Mkosana	(United States) Penn FC	Free Transfer	December 19, 2018	
16	MF	(United States) Geoffrey Dee	(United States) University of Louisville	Free Transfer	March 6, 2019	

=== Out ===
No.	Pos.	Player	Transferred to	Fee/notes	Date	Source
14	FW	(Serbia) Ilija Ilić	(United States) Indy Eleven	Free Transfer	December 3, 2018	
1	GK	(Trinidad and Tobago) Greg Ranjitsingh	(United States) Orlando City SC	Undisclosed Fee	December 19, 2018	
24	DF	(United States) Kyle Smith	(United States) Orlando City SC	Undisclosed Fee	December 19, 2018	
9	FW	(England) Cameron Lancaster	(United States) Nashville SC	Free Transfer	December 20, 2018	
17	MF	(United States) Jose Carranza	Unattached		March 23, 2019	

=== Loans in ===
No.	Pos.	Player	Loaned from	Fee/notes	Start date	End date	Source
39	GK	(United States) Ben Lundt	(United States) FC Cincinnati	Undisclosed Fee	February 7, 2019	November 18, 2019	

== Competitions ==
=== Exhibitions ===
All times in Eastern time.

February 6 Preseason	Orlando City SC	1–0	Louisville City FC	Orlando, Florida
EDT	Moutinho			Stadium: Orlando City Stadium; Attendance: Closed-door

February 9 Preseason	Nashville SC	2–1	Louisville City FC	Bradenton, Florida
EDT	Hume 24'; Winn 70'	Report	Craig 45'	Stadium: IMG Academy

February 14 Preseason	New England Revolution	1–3	Louisville City FC	Bradenton, Florida
EDT	Caicedo (yellow card) 47'; Anibaba (yellow card) 50'; Rennicks 68'; Zahibo (yellow card) 77'	Report	Williams 3'; McCabe 29'; Rasmussen 65'	Stadium: IMG Academy

February 16 Preseason	USF Bulls	2–3	Louisville City FC	Bradenton, Florida
EDT	Goal		Rasmussen; Spencer; DelPiccolo	Stadium: IMG Academy

February 20 Preseason	Memphis 901 FC	2–4	Louisville City FC	Nashville, Tennessee
EDT	Najem 32'; 65'	Report	Spencer 20' (pen.), 33'; Mkosana 67'; Matsoso 88'	Stadium: Vanderbilt University

February 24 Preseason	Kentucky Wildcats	1–1	Louisville City FC	Lexington, Kentucky
EDT	Guindon 42'	Report	Jane 85'	Stadium: Wendell & Vickie Bell Soccer Complex

March 2 Preseason	Louisville Cardinals	1–3	Louisville City FC	Louisville, Kentucky
EDT	Fonseca 37' (pen.)	LCFC Report; UL Report	McCabe 53'; Williams 78'; Souahy 84'	Stadium: Dr. Mark & Cindy Lynn Stadium

March 16 Midseason	Chattanooga Red Wolves SC	1–1	Louisville City FC	Chattanooga, Tennessee
10:45 EDT	Caparelli 88'	Report	Rasmussen 45'	Stadium: David Stanton Field

=== USL Championship ===
==== Eastern Conference standings ====
Pos	Team	Pld	W	D	L	GF	GA	GD	Pts	Qualification
2	Nashville SC	34	20	7	7	59	26	+33	67	Conference Quarterfinals
3	Indy Eleven	34	19	6	9	48	29	+19	63	Conference Quarterfinals
4	Louisville City FC	34	17	9	8	58	41	+17	60	Conference Quarterfinals
5	Tampa Bay Rowdies	34	16	10	8	61	33	+28	58	Conference Quarterfinals
6	New York Red Bulls II	34	17	6	11	74	51	+23	57	Conference Quarterfinals

Source: USL Championship Standings
Rules for classification: 1) total wins; 2) total goal differential; 3) total goals scored; 4) points earned against top four Conference finishers; 5) disciplinary points; 6) coin toss or drawing of lots

==== Results summary ====
Overall								Home						Away					
Pld	W	D	L	GF	GA	GD	Pts	W	D	L	GF	GA	GD	W	D	L	GF	GA	GD
34	17	9	8	58	41	+17	60	10	4	3	38	21	+17	7	5	5	20	20	0

Last updated: September 8, 2019.
Source: Match reports

Round	1	2	3	4	5	6	7	8	9	10	11	12	13	14	15	16	17	18	19	20	21	22	23	24	25	26	27	28	29	30	31	32	33	34
Stadium	A	A	H	H	H	A	H	H	A	A	H	A	H	H	A	H	A	H	A	H	A	A	H	A	H	H	A	A	H	H	A	A	H	A
Result	L	W	W	L	L	D	W	W	L	W	D	D	W	W	L	D	D	W	D	L	L	W	W	W	W	D	D	W	W	D	W	L	W	W

Updated to match(es) played on August 11, 2019. Source: Match reports
A = Away; H = Home; W = Win; D = Draw; L = Loss

On December 19, 2018, the USL announced their 2019 season schedule.
All times in regular season on Eastern Daylight Time (UTC-04:00)

==== Results ====
March 9 1	North Carolina FC	4–1	Louisville City FC	Cary, North Carolina
3:00 PM EST	Lomis 34'; McCabe 50'; Ewolo 53'; Kristo 83'	Report	Jane 90+4'	Stadium: Sahlen's Stadium at WakeMed Soccer Park; Attendance: 3,213; Referee: Matt Franz; Assistant referees: Jeremy Smith; Justin Howard

March 15 2	Atlanta United 2	0–1	Louisville City FC	Kennesaw, Georgia
7:30 PM EDT	Metcalf (yellow card) 5'; Asiedu (yellow card) 62'	Report	Thiam 72'	Stadium: Fifth Third Bank Stadium; Attendance: 1,571; Referee: Elton Garcia; Assistant referees: Zach McWhorter; Richonne Clark; Fourth official: Brandon Adams

March 23 3	Louisville City FC	2–1	Hartford Athletic	Louisville, Kentucky
7:00 PM EDT	Spencer 14', (yellow card) 90' de Wit 33' (o.g.)	Report	Lyngø (yellow card) 4'; Brown 6'; Jørgensen (yellow card) 67' de Wit (yellow card) 90+4'	Stadium: Louisville Slugger Field; Attendance: 8,561; Referee: Charles Murphy; Assistant referees: Benjamin Hall-Volpenhein; Jeffrey Swartzel; Fourth official: Chris Schurfranz

March 31 4	Louisville City FC	2–3	Birmingham Legion FC	Louisville, Kentucky
10:00 AM EDT	Rasmussen 30'; Craig (yellow card) 47'; Laurent 81' (o.g.)	Report	Laurent (yellow card) 21'; Kasim 31'; Hoffman 36'; Wright 87'	Stadium: Louisville Slugger Field; Attendance: 6,811; Referee: Mike Lavergne; Assistant referees: Ben Pilgrim; Ethan Buege; Fourth official: Chad Collins
Note: Match originally scheduled for March 30, 2019, 7:00 pm EDT kickoff

April 6 5	Louisville City FC	0–1	Pittsburgh Riverhounds SC	Louisville, Kentucky
7:00 PM EDT	Mkosana (yellow card) 78'; Rasmussen (yellow card) 89'	Report	Greenspan (yellow card) 29'; Brett 74' (pen.); James (yellow card) 75'	Stadium: Louisville Slugger Field; Attendance: 8,544; Referee: Greg Dopka; Assistant referees: Matthew Rodman; Benjamin Hall-Volpenhein; Fourth official: William Gaither III

April 13 6	Tampa Bay Rowdies	1–1	Louisville City FC	St. Petersburg, Florida
7:30 PM EDT	Tinari 15'; Hoppenot (yellow card) 21'; Guenzatti (yellow card) 75'; Ekra (yellow card) 78'; Oduro (yellow card) 85'	Report	Jimenez (yellow card) 68'; Williams (yellow card) 85'; Thiam 88'	Stadium: Al Lang Stadium; Referee: Lorant Varga; Assistant referees: Walter Heatherly; Abdel Kuttaineh; Fourth official: Miguel Martes

April 20 7	Louisville City FC	1–0	Ottawa Fury FC	Louisville, Kentucky
7:00 PM EDT	Mkosana 60'	Report		Stadium: Louisville Slugger Field; Attendance: 7,110; Referee: Farhad Dadkho; Assistant referees: Tom Felice; Matthew Seem; Fourth official: Malik Oudghiri

April 30 8	Louisville City FC	2–1	Memphis 901 FC	Louisville, Kentucky
7:00 PM EDT	Craig (yellow card) 5'; Rasmussen 33'; Mkosana 61', (yellow card) 84'	Report	Thiam 71' (o.g.); Burch (yellow card) 84'	Stadium: Louisville Slugger Field; Attendance: 7,816; Referee: Ismir Pekmic; Assistant referees: Eric Wood; Noah Matos; Fourth official: William Gaither III

May 6 9	Swope Park Rangers	3–2	Louisville City FC	Kansas City, Kansas
8:00 PM EDT	Hernandez 30'; Akhmatov 34', (yellow card) 45+2'; Rwatubyaye 90'	Report	Rasmussen 49'; Spencer 58'; McCabe (red card) 88'	Stadium: Children's Mercy Park; Attendance: 214; Referee: Rosendo Mendoza; Assistant referees: Truman Berghall; Matthew Seem; Fourth official: Matt Gaudreau

May 11 10	Birmingham Legion FC	0–3	Louisville City FC	Birmingham, Alabama
8:00 PM EDT		Report	Rasmussen 6'; Mkosana 24'; Spencer 53'	Stadium: BBVA Compass Field; Attendance: 3,877; Referee: Matt Franz; Assistant referees: Jennifer Garner; Tiffini Turpin; Fourth official: Matthew Thompson

May 18 11	Louisville City FC	0–0	Saint Louis FC	Louisville, Kentucky
7:00 PM EDT	Jimenez (yellow card) 41'; Craig (yellow card) 80'; Francis (yellow card) 90'; Williams (yellow card) 90+2'	Report	Abend (yellow card) 35'	Stadium: Louisville Slugger Field; Attendance: 9,688; Referee: Guido Gonzales, Jr. Assistant referees: Benjamin Hall-Volpenhein; Christopher Slane; Fourth official: Chad Collins

May 25 12	Bethlehem Steel FC	2–2	Louisville City FC	Chester, Pennsylvania
7:00 PM EDT	Mbaizo (yellow card) 31'; Moumbagna (red card) 37'; Willis 51' (pen.), 57'; Topey (yellow card) 87'; Ofeimu (yellow card) 89' (yellow-red card) 90+2'	Report	Spencer 26'; Craig (yellow card) 30'; Matsoso (red card) 37'; Mkosana 46'; Rasmussen (yellow card) 56'; Thiam (yellow card) 87'	Stadium: Talen Energy Stadium; Attendance: 219; Referee: Kevin Broadley; Assistant referees: Jonah Kind; Ben Pilgrim; Fourth official: Ariel Raban

June 1 13	Louisville City FC	4–1	Charleston Battery	Louisville, Kentucky
7:00 PM EDT	Davis 3'; Rasmussen 21' (pen.); Jimenez (yellow card) 49'; Craig (yellow card) 67' (yellow-red card) 90+2'; Marini 74' (o.g.); Ownby (red card) 79'; McCabe 87'	Report	Mason (red card) 19'; Bosua 50'; Van Schaik (yellow card) 86'; Piggott (yellow card) 90'	Stadium: Louisville Slugger Field; Attendance: 8,369; Referee: Elvis Osmanovic; Assistant referees: Trent Robert Van Haitsma; Matthew Osterhouse; Fourth official: Johann Pedolzky

June 8 14	Louisville City FC	2–1	Loudoun United FC	Louisville, Kentucky
7:00 PM EDT	Rasmussen 1'; Totsch 39'; Peay (yellow card) 45'; McCabe (yellow card) 45'	Report	Yow 49'; Nyeman (yellow card) 50'; Hawkins (yellow card) 90+4'	Stadium: Louisville Slugger Field; Attendance: 8,135; Referee: Marcos DeOliveira; Assistant referees: Ryan Graves; Jeffrey Swartzel; Fourth official: Anthony Frizzell

June 16 15	New York Red Bulls II	1–0	Louisville City FC	Montclair, New Jersey
3:00 PM EDT	Louro (yellow card) 45+2'; Jørgenson 83'	Report	Matsoso (yellow card) 17'; DelPiccolo (yellow card) 18'; Craig (yellow card) 45+2'	Stadium: MSU Soccer Park; Referee: Elijio Arreguin; Assistant referees: Amilcar Sicaju; Patrick Casey; Fourth official: Kevin Cavalcanti

June 22 16	Louisville City FC	1–1	Charlotte Independence	Louisville, Kentucky
7:00 PM EDT	Rasmussen (yellow card) 71'; Spencer 77'; Matsoso (yellow card) 87'; Jane (yellow card) 90+1'	Report	Oduro 12'; Mansally (yellow card) 58'; Taku (yellow card) 90+2'	Stadium: Louisville Slugger Field; Attendance: 9,379; Referee: Elton Garcia; Assistant referees: Benjamin Hall-Volpenhein; Justin Mack; Fourth official: Casie Anderson

June 29 17	Indy Eleven	1–1	Louisville City FC	Indianapolis, Indiana
7:00 PM EDT	Pasher 9'; Farias (yellow card) 45+3'; Osmond (yellow card) 69'; Ayoze (yellow card) 80'	Report	Craig (yellow card) 29'; DelPiccolo (yellow card) 53', (goal) 55'; Souahy (yellow card) 64'	Stadium: Lucas Oil Stadium; Attendance: 10,584; Referee: Farhad Dadkho; Assistant referees: Ian McKay; Jeffrey Swartzel; Fourth official: Ramazan Altun

July 6 18	Louisville City FC	2–1	Nashville SC	Louisville, Kentucky
7:00 PM EDT	Craig 65'; Hoppenot 74'	Report	Ríos 11'; Moloto (yellow card) 72'	Stadium: Louisville Slugger Field; Attendance: 9,892; Referee: Lorant Varga; Assistant referees: Tom Felice; Jeffrey Skinker; Fourth official: Youssef Elmessoussi

July 14 19	Ottawa Fury FC	1–1	Louisville City FC	Ottawa, Ontario
2:00 PM EDT	Fall 56' (pen.); Meilleur-Giguère (yellow card) 77'; Obasi (yellow card) 90+2'	Report	Rasmussen 67', (yellow card) 81'	Stadium: TD Place; Attendance: 5,770; Referee: Juan Márquez; Assistant referees: Andre Pickler; Sean Hornsby; Fourth official: Maxime Blouin

July 20 20	Louisville City FC	0–1	Bethlehem Steel FC	Louisville, Kentucky
7:00 PM EDT	Craig (yellow card) 45'	Report	Cortes 26', (yellow card) 85'; Real (yellow card) 90+3'	Stadium: Louisville Slugger Field; Attendance: 8,965; Referee: Guido Gonzales Jr. Assistant referees: Walter Heatherly; Trent Robert Van Haitsma; Fourth official: Steve Eordogh

July 28 21	Loudoun United FC	3–0	Louisville City FC	Washington, D.C.
7:30 PM EDT	A. Bustamante 22'; Murphy (yellow card) 68'; Martinez (yellow card) 72'; Amoh 84'; Nyeman 87'	Report	Souahy (red card) 30'; Ownby (yellow card) 90+2'	Stadium: Audi Field; Attendance: 593; Referee: Dejan Susak; Assistant referees: Nick Balcer; Eric Wood; Fourth official: Brendan Orino

August 3 22	Charlotte Independence	0–1	Louisville City FC	Matthews, North Carolina
7:00 PM EDT	Martínez (yellow card) 72' (yellow-red card) 72'; Johnson (yellow card) 90+4'	Report	Craig (yellow card) 29' (yellow-red card) 60'; McMahon (yellow card) 47'; Spencer 80'	Stadium: Sportsplex at Matthews; Attendance: 1,835; Referee: Malik Badawi; Assistant referees: Ian McKay; Jordan Davis; Fourth official: John Matto

August 11 23	Louisville City FC	5–1	Atlanta United 2	Louisville, Kentucky
3:00 PM EDT	Ownby 16'; McMahon 41'; McCabe 75'; Spencer 83'; Rasmussen 85'	Report	Decas (yellow card) 49'; Hernández (yellow card) 65'; Conway 72'; Metcalf (yellow card) 86'	Stadium: Louisville Slugger Field; Attendance: 9,292; Referee: Matthew Thompson; Assistant referees: Brooke Mayo; Ryan Graves; Fourth official: Jackson Krauser

August 17 24	Charleston Battery	1–2	Louisville City FC	Charleston, South Carolina
7:30 PM EDT	Guerra 7'; Anunga (yellow card) 41'	Report	Totsch (yellow card) 13'; Rasmussen 30' (pen.), (yellow card) 81'; Williams (yellow card) 67'; McMahon (yellow card) 74'; Davis 88'	Stadium: MUSC Health Stadium; Attendance: 1,972; Referee: Rosendo Mendoza; Assistant referees: Ryan Graves; Jeremy Smith; Fourth official: Mychal Frost

August 24 25	Louisville City FC	1–0	North Carolina FC	Louisville, Kentucky
3:00 PM EDT	Rasmussen 55', (yellow card) 74'; Totsch (yellow card) 76'; McMahon (yellow card) 84'	Report	Miller (yellow card) 78'	Stadium: Louisville Slugger Field; Attendance: 9,168; Referee: Elvis Osmanovic; Assistant referees: Walter Heatherly; Noah Matos; Fourth official: Aaron Rawlins

August 30 26	Louisville City FC	1–1	Indy Eleven	Louisville, Kentucky
7:00 PM EDT	Craig (yellow card) 21'; Thiam 70', (yellow card) 82'; McCabe (yellow card) 90+4'	Report	Pasher 43'; Newton (yellow card) 82'; Ouimette (yellow card) 87'; Ayoze (yellow card) 90'	Stadium: Louisville Slugger Field; Attendance: 9,211; Referee: Mark Allatin; Assistant referees: Trent Robert Van Haitsma; Zach McWhorter; Fourth official: Chris Schurfranz

September 7 27	Pittsburgh Riverhounds SC	0–0	Louisville City FC	Pittsburgh, Pennsylvania
7:00 PM EDT	Dover (yellow card) 33'	Report	Souahy (yellow card) 31'	Stadium: Highmark Stadium; Attendance: 3,526; Referee: Elton Garcia; Assistant referees: Ryan Graves; Nick Balcer; Fourth official: Brandon Rea

September 14 28	Hartford Athletic	0–1	Louisville City FC	Hartford, Connecticut
7:00 PM EDT	de Wit (yellow card) 69'; Barrera (yellow card) 82'; Dixon (yellow card) 90+2'	Report	Matsoso 59'; Thiam (yellow card) 65'; Craig (yellow card) 71'; Ownby (yellow card) 90+3'	Stadium: Dillon Stadium; Attendance: 4,742; Referee: Matthew Franz; Assistant referees: Justen Lopez; Patrick Casey; Fourth official: Daniel Aloi

September 21 29	Louisville City FC	5–3	New York Red Bulls II	Louisville, Kentucky
7:00 PM EDT	Jimenez (yellow card) 17', (goal) 24'; Matsoso (yellow card) 29', (goal) 31', 33'; Hoppenot 45+2'; Craig (yellow card) 54'; McCabe 59'	Report	Bezecourt 20'; Stroud 37' (pen.); Boateng (yellow card) 62'; Koffi (yellow card) 66'; Sowe 71'	Stadium: Louisville Slugger Field; Attendance: 9,946; Referee: Malik Badawi; Assistant referees: Jeffrey Swartzel; Zach McWhorter; Fourth official: Ramazan Altun

September 28 30	Louisville City FC	2–2	Tampa Bay Rowdies	Louisville, Kentucky
7:00 PM EDT	Craig 35'; Matsoso (yellow card) 30', (goal) 79'	Report	Morad (yellow card) 34'; Doherty (yellow card) 36' (yellow-red card) 83'; Guenzatti (yellow card) 45+1', (goal) 87' (pen.); Mkosana 89'; McCarthy (yellow card) 90+4'	Stadium: Louisville Slugger Field; Attendance: 10,360; Referee: Jon Freemon; Assistant referees: Tom Felice; Art Arustamyan; Fourth official: Brandon Artis

October 5 31	Saint Louis FC	0–1	Louisville City FC	Fenton, Missouri
8:30 PM EDT	Kamdem (yellow card) 51'	Report	Rasmussen 12'	Stadium: Toyota Stadium; Attendance: 4,512; Referee: Guido Gonzales, Jr. Assistant referees: Jeffrey Swartzel; Justen Lopez; Fourth official: Phillip Gomez

October 8 32	Nashville SC	2–1	Louisville City FC	Nashville, Tennessee
8:00 PM EDT	Washington 5'; King (yellow card) 45+1'; Moloto (yellow card) 59'; Akinyode (yellow card) 62'; Ríos (yellow card) 81'; Ockford 90+2'; Belmar (yellow card) 90+4'	Report	Davis (yellow card) 41'; Craig (yellow card) 51'; Spencer 79'; Williams (yellow card) 90+2'	Stadium: First Tennessee Park; Attendance: 5,837; Referee: Lukasz Szpala; Assistant referees: Walter Heatherly; Eric Wood; Fourth official: Judson Holden

October 12 33	Louisville City FC	8–3	Swope Park Rangers	Louisville, Kentucky
7:00 PM EDT	Matsoso 36'; Souahy 40'; Hoppenot 43', (yellow card) 81'; Ownby 54'; Rasmussen 72', 78'; DelPiccolo (yellow card) 84'; Ballard 85'; Davis 88'	Report	Zé Pedro 7'; Busio 19', (yellow card) 45+1'; Vanacore-Decker 34'; Allach (yellow card) 61'; Hernandez (yellow card) 73'	Stadium: Louisville Slugger Field; Attendance: 12,188; Referee: Eric Tattersall; Assistant referees: Art Arustamyan; Matthew Rodman; Fourth official: Chris Schurfranz

October 19 34	Memphis 901 FC	1–2	Louisville City FC	Memphis, Tennessee
8:00 PM EDT	Epps 9'	Report	Williams 37', (yellow card) 87'; Rasmussen (yellow card) 42'; Hoppenot 78'	Stadium: AutoZone Park; Attendance: 6,845; Referee: Lorant Varga; Assistant referees: Tom Felice; Justin Howard; Fourth official: Rebecca Luther

==== USL Championship Playoffs ====
Eastern Conference Play-In; October 23
7	North Carolina FC	2
10	Birmingham Legion FC	3

Eastern Conference Play-In; October 23
8	Ottawa Fury FC	1 (4)
9	Charleston Battery (p)	1 (5)

Western Conference Play-In; October 23
7	Sacramento Republic	2
10	New Mexico United	1

Western Conference Play-In; October 23
8	Austin Bold FC	2
9	LA Galaxy II	0

Conference Quarterfinals; October 26	Conference Semifinals; November 1–2
1	Pittsburgh Riverhounds SC	7
10	Birmingham Legion FC	0
1	Pittsburgh Riverhounds SC	1
4	Louisville City FC (a.e.t.)	2
4	Louisville City FC	2
5	Tampa Bay Rowdies	1
Eastern Conference
3	Indy Eleven	1
6	New York Red Bulls II	0
3	Indy Eleven	1
2	Nashville SC	0
2	Nashville SC	3
9	Charleston Battery	1
1	Phoenix Rising FC (p)	0 (8)
8	Austin Bold FC	0 (7)
1	Phoenix Rising FC	1
4	Real Monarchs SLC	2
4	Real Monarchs SLC	6
5	Orange County SC	2
Western Conference
3	Fresno FC	2
6	El Paso Locomotive FC	3
6	El Paso Locomotive FC	3
7	Sacramento Republic	0
2	Reno 1868 FC	1
7	Sacramento Republic	3

Conference Final; November 9
4	Louisville City FC (a.e.t.)	3
3	Indy Eleven	1
4	Real Monarchs SLC (a.e.t.)	2
6	El Paso Locomotive FC	1

USL Championship Final; November 17
4	Louisville City FC	1
4	Real Monarchs SLC	3

October 27, 2019 First round	Louisville City FC	2–1	Tampa Bay Rowdies	Louisville, Kentucky
7:00 p.m. EDT	Rasmussen 23', 24'; Ownby (yellow card) 56'	Report	Ekra (yellow card) 40'; Diakité (yellow card) 70'; Guenzatti 80'	Stadium: Louisville Slugger Field; Attendance: 4,636; Referee: Farhad Dadkho; Assistant referees: Jeffrey Skinker; Tyler Wyrostek; Fourth official: Eric Tattersall

November 2, 2019 Quarter Final	Pittsburgh Riverhounds SC	1–2 (a.e.t.)	Louisville City FC	Pittsburgh, Pennsylvania
7:00 p.m. EDT	Vancaeyezeele 11'; Greenspan (yellow card) 48'	Report	Spencer 51', (yellow card) 85'; McMahon (yellow card) 54'; Craig (yellow card) 70'; DelPiccolo 118'	Stadium: Highmark Stadium; Attendance: 6,073; Referee: Michael Radchuk; Assistant referees: Tom Felice; Ben Pilgrim; Fourth official: Elvis Osmanovic

November 9, 2019 Semi Final	Indy Eleven	1–3 (a.e.t.)	Louisville City FC	Indianapolis, Indiana
3:00 PM EDT	Barrett (yellow card) 45+1'; Pasher 67'; Ouimette (yellow card) 90+2'; Hackshaw (yellow card) 102'	Report	Williams (yellow card) 85'; Thiam (yellow card) 90'; Hoppenot 90+4'; Rasmussen 94'; Ownby (yellow card) 106'; Spencer 113' (pen.)	Stadium: Michael A. Carroll Stadium; Attendance: 7,171; Referee: Guido Gonzales Jr; Assistant referees: Jeffrey Swartzel; Ryan Graves; Fourth official: Victor Rivas

November 17, 2019 Final	Louisville City FC	1–3	Real Monarchs SLC	Louisville, Kentucky
7:30 PM EST	Rasmussen 6'; Williams (yellow card) 89'	Report	Holt 25', (yellow card) 69'; Plewa 45'; Schmitt (yellow card) 59'; Powder 66'	Stadium: Lynn Stadium; Attendance: 7,025; Referee: Tim Ford; Assistant referees: Jeremy Kieso; Cory Richardson; Fourth official: Malik Badawi

=== U.S. Open Cup ===
As a member of the USL Championship, Louisville City entered the tournament in the second round, with their Cup opener played on May 15, 2019.

May 15 Second Round	Louisville City FC (Kentucky)	3–0	(Pennsylvania) Reading United AC	Louisville, Kentucky
7:00 PM EDT	Thiam 12' (McCabe); Totsch (yellow card) 13'; Davis 19'; Jane (yellow card) 36', (goal) 88'	Report		Stadium: Dr. Mark & Cindy Lynn Stadium; Attendance: 1,468; Referee: Brandon Artis; Assistant referees: Mathew Fotia; Chris Schurfranz; Fourth official: William Gaither III

May 29 Third Round	Louisville City FC (Kentucky)	1–0	(Alabama) Birmingham Legion FC	Louisville, Kentucky
7:00 pm EDT	Totsch 90' (pen.); Francis (yellow card) 90+5'	Report	Hollinger-Janzen (yellow card) 21'; Culbertson (yellow card) 82' van Oekel (yellow card) 89'	Stadium: Dr. Mark & Cindy Lynn Stadium; Attendance: 1,403; Referee: Kevin Fikar; Assistant referees: Maggie Short; Casie Anderson; Fourth official: Mathew Fotia

June 12 Fourth Round	FC Cincinnati (Ohio)	2–1 (a.e.t.)	(Kentucky) Louisville City FC	Cincinnati, Ohio
7:30 pm EDT	Adi 23', (yellow card) 116'; Manneh 103', (yellow card) 104'	Report	Mkosana 30'	Stadium: Nippert Stadium; Attendance: 6,895; Referee: Ismir Pekmic; Assistant referees: Brian Marshall; Chris Schurfranz; Fourth official: Austin Saini

== Player statistics ==
=== Top scorers ===
Place	Position	Number	Name	USL	U.S. Open Cup	USL Cup	Total
1	MF	7	(Denmark) Magnus Rasmussen	13	0	4	17
2	FW	9	(United States) Luke Spencer	8	0	2	10
3	MF	27	(Lesotho) Napo Matsoso	5	0	0	5
3	FW	77	(Zimbabwe) Lucky Mkosana	4	1	0	5
3	FW	29	(France) Antoine Hoppenot	4	0	1	5
6	FW	14	(Senegal) Abdou Mbacke Thiam	3	1	0	4
6	MF	22	(United States) George Davis IV	3	1	0	4
8	MF	11	(Republic of Ireland) Niall McCabe	3	0	0	3
9	DF	5	(England) Paco Craig	2	0	0	2
9	FW	10	(United States) Brian Ownby	2	0	0	2
9	FW	12	(Lesotho) Sunny Jane	1	1	0	2
9	DF	4	(United States) Sean Totsch	1	1	0	2
14	DF	15	(United States) Pat McMahon	1	0	0	1
9	MF	36	(United States) Paolo DelPiccolo	1	0	1	2
14	MF	19	(United States) Oscar Jimenez	1	0	0	1
14	DF	3	(France) Alexis Souahy	1	0	0	1
14	FW	23	(United States) Richard Ballard	1	0	0	1
14	MF	80	(Jamaica) Devon Williams	1	0	0	1
Total				55	5	7	67

=== Assist leaders ===
Place	Position	Number	Name	USL	U.S. Open Cup	USL Cup	Total
1	MF	19	(United States) Oscar Jimenez	7	0	0	7
1	MF	11	(Republic of Ireland) Niall McCabe	5	1	1	7
3	MF	10	(United States) Brian Ownby	4	0	1	5
4	FW	9	(United States) Luke Spencer	4	0	0	4
4	MF	7	(Denmark) Magnus Rasmussen	3	1	0	4
4	FW	14	(Senegal) Abdou Mbacke Thiam	3	0	1	4
7	MF	22	(United States) George Davis IV	2	0	0	2
7	DF	3	(France) Alexis Souahy	2	0	0	2
9	DF	2	(United States) Taylor Peay	1	0	0	1
9	MF	21	(Jamaica) Shaun Francis	1	0	0	1
9	DF	4	(United States) Sean Totsch	1	0	0	1
9	MF	80	(Jamaica) Devon Williams	1	0	0	1
9	MF	27	(Lesotho) Napo Matsoso	1	0	0	1
9	MF	29	(France) Antoine Hoppenot	1	0	0	1
Total				36	2	3	41

=== Clean sheets ===
Place	Position	Number	Name	USL	U.S. Open Cup	USL Cup	Total
1	GK	13	(United States) Chris Hubbard	5	2	0	7
2	GK	39	(Germany) Ben Lundt	4	0	0	4
Total				9	2	0	11

=== Disciplinary ===
No.	Pos.	Name	USL		U.S. Open Cup		USL Cup		Total	
No.	Pos.	Name	Booked	Sent off (straight red)	Booked	Sent off (straight red)	Booked	Sent off (straight red)	Booked	Sent off (straight red)
5	DF	(England) Paco Craig	12	2	0	0	1	0	13	2
11	MF	(Republic of Ireland) Niall McCabe	2	1	0	0	0	0	2	1
10	MF	(United States) Brian Ownby	2	1	0	0	2	0	4	1
27	MF	(Lesotho) Napo Matsoso	4	1	0	0	0	0	4	1
14	FW	(Senegal) Abdou Mbacke Thiam	3	0	0	0	1	0	4	0
19	MF	(United States) Oscar Jimenez	4	0	0	0	0	0	4	0
77	FW	(Zimbabwe) Lucky Mkosana	3	0	0	0	0	0	3	0
29	FW	(United States) Antoine Hoppenot	3	0	0	0	0	0	3	0
80	MF	(Jamaica) Devon Williams	5	0	0	0	1	0	6	0
7	MF	(Denmark) Magnus Rasmussen	7	0	0	0	0	0	7	0
21	MF	(Jamaica) Shaun Francis	1	0	1	0	0	0	2	0
9	FW	(United States) Luke Spencer	1	0	0	0	1	0	2	0
2	DF	(United States) Taylor Peay	1	0	0	0	0	0	1	0
15	DF	(United States) Pat McMahon	3	0	0	0	1	0	4	0
5	FW	(Lesotho) Sunny Jane	1	0	1	0	0	0	2	0
4	DF	(United States) Sean Totsch	2	0	1	0	0	0	3	0
36	MF	(United States) Paolo DelPiccolo	3	0	0	0	0	0	3	0
3	DF	(France) Alexis Souahy	2	1	0	0	0	0	2	1
22	MF	(United States) George Davis IV	1	0	0	0	0	0	1	0
29	MF	(France) Antoine Hoppenot	1	0	0	0	0	0	1	0
Total			61	5	3	0	7	0	71	5
