= 2023 Louisville City FC season =

Season of a professional football team

Louisville City FC
2023 season
- Owner: John Neace
- Manager: Danny Cruz
- Stadium: Lynn Family Stadium
- USL: Eastern Conf.: 5th
- 2023 U.S. Open Cup: Third round
- USL Playoffs: Eastern Conference Finals
- Top goalscorer: League: Harris (9 goals); All: Lancaster (11 goals)
- Highest home attendance: 13,248 (7–29 vs. IND)
- Lowest home attendance: 7,285 (8–9 vs. CHS)
- Average home league attendance: 10,549
- Biggest win: 0–3 (8–1 at TUL)
- Biggest defeat: 0–5 (4–1 vs. SAC)
Home colors	Away colors	Third colors

The 2023 Louisville City FC season was the club's ninth season of competition. Louisville City competed in the USL Championship, the second tier of professional soccer in the United States.

== Background ==
The previous season was the first season since 2019 not to be impacted by the COVID-19 pandemic. It was full 34 match regular that did away with divisions. Instead opting for a single table for each conference. It was also the first season since 2019 in which the U.S. Open Cup was held.

The team won the Eastern Conference in the penultimate match of the season against Detroit City FC, and finished the year with a club record 72 points and earning a bye into the Conference Semi-finals. They advanced to the USL Championship match by defeating the Tampa Bay Rowdies in the Conference Finals, avenging Conference Finals losses to Tampa Bay in the previous two seasons. They lost the USL Championship match to San Antonio FC. In the U.S. Open Cup the team reached the Round of 16 for the first time since 2018, losing at home to MLS side Nashville SC.

Kyle Morton and Elijah Wynder became the first Louisville City players to earn the league's Golden Glove and Comeback Player of the Year awards respectively, while Kyle Morton and Sean Totsch were both selected for all league teams.

== Summary ==
=== March and April ===
Louisville City opened the USL season with back to back matches in California. Defeating Orange County and Monterey Bay 1–3 and 0–1 on March 11 and 18 respectively. With Niall McCabe scoring the opening goal of the season. On March 25 they played their home opener against El Paso. A match they would lose 0–3 in front of record crowd for an opening match. This was also only the third multi-goal loss at Lynn Family Stadium. They returned to California for their next match; this time against Sacramento. They would lose this match 5–0 which was the worst league loss in club history. After giving up 8 goals over 2 matches reigning USL golden glove winner Kyle Morton was effectively replaced as first choice goal keeper by rookie Oliver Semmle. Semmle would go on to post four consecutive clean sheets before giving up his first league goal in the 52nd minute against Memphis.

This would be the start of a streak of five matches unbeaten. Beginning with a pair of 1–0 victories over Detroit and San Antonio in a rematch of the previous seasons' USL Final. Followed up by draws against Charleston and Memphis. During this opening stretch of the campaign goals were well distributed amongst team. Six different players scored across the first 8 league games. With only Harris scoring a second goal giving Louisville City a total of 7 goals over that time frame. This gave Louisville an average of 0.875 goals per game. The lowest such rate to begin a season in club history. The Memphis match was also the last match where Joshua Wynder would appear before making a record breaking USL transfer to Benfica.

=== May and June ===
Following a break for the Kentucky Derby Louisville returned home to defeat Miami FC 3–1. Only the second multi-goal performance of the season and first since the opening match. For the following two matches returned to scoring only a single goal per match. With the first match being a 1–2 home loss in front of a record mid-week crowd to FC Tulsa with Phillip Goodrum scoring the winning goal in the 89th minute. Ending a 5 match streak of allowing no more than one goal per match. The second match was a 0–1 away victory in a rivalry match Indy Eleven. Louisville's first victory in LIPAFC since the 2021 season.

In the following match Semmle earned another clean sheet in a scoreless draw against Hartford. Not only did Louisville fail to score they also didn't have a shot on target. Louisville would then return home to face Memphis. Louisville would find the scoresheet again as Harris scored his team leading fourth league goal. However, Memphis went on the win the game 1–3. The first time since the pandemic shortened season of 2020 that Louisville would lose back-to-back home games. For the next match Louisville travelled on June 17 to western conference side Phoenix. In this match Louisville scored two goals. The first match since May 13 where Louisville scored multiple goals. Louisville was leading the match 1–2 until the 74th minute when Manuel Arteaga converted a penalty to draw Phoenix level. Phoenix was then awarded another penalty in 80th minute. This penalty, taken by Danny Trejo, was saved by Semmle preserving a 2–2 draw and marking the beginning of a four match unbeaten streak. In the next match Louisville played another western conference side. This time at home against Las Vegas in the first ever meeting between the two clubs. Semmle would earn his league leading seventh clean sheet with a Enoch Mushagalusa goal leading to a 1–0 for the home side. Mushagalusa's first goal since the opening match of the season and the beginning of three match clean sheet streak for Semmle.

=== July and August ===
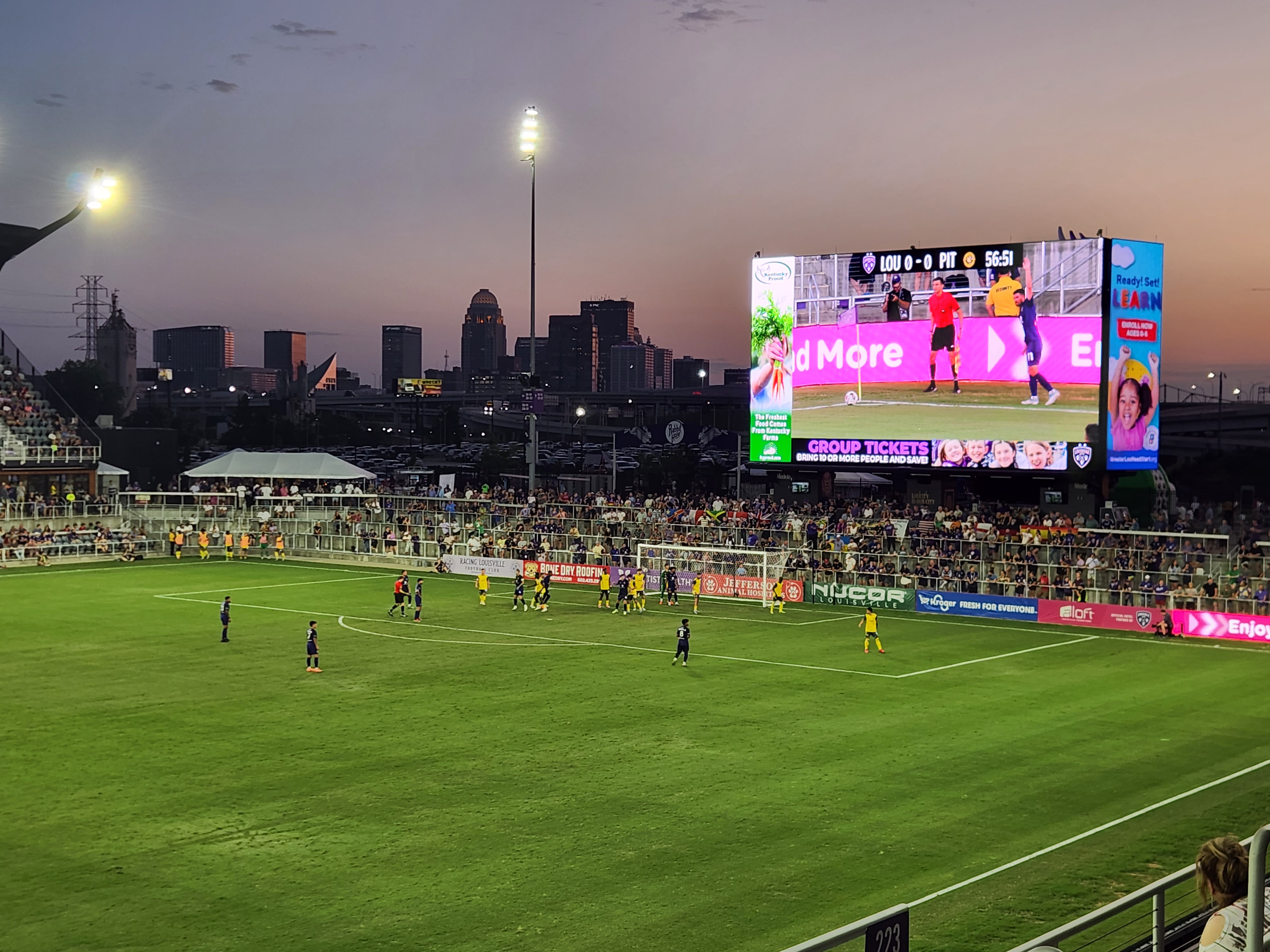
Louisville City Corner Kick at Lynn Family Stadium against Pittsburgh Riverhounds

On July 1 Louisville travelled to Pittsburgh to play the conference leading Riverhounds. A match played to a goalless draw in the rain. Louisville would fail to have a shot on target but did have an Elijah Wynder shot cleared off the line by Dani Rovira. Next, Louisville returned home to play Loudoun United in Sean Totsch's 200th appearance for the club. This began a stretch of six home league matches out of eight. A match they won 1–0 as Cameron Lancaster scored his first goal since the opening match of the season. This marked the halfway point of the season. Over the first half of the season Louisville scored an average of 1 goal per game. The lowest such average to open the season in club history and second lowest in the conference. Eight different players scored with Harris being the club leader with four. On the defensive side of the field Louisville and Semmle lead the league with nine clean sheets; setting a club record for number of clean sheets in the opening half of a 34 match season. The club conceded 18 goals. The second lowest goals allowed in the conference; trailing Pittsburgh.

To begin the second half of the season Louisville played Pittsburgh for the second time in three matches. Louisville would again fail to score while a 68th goal by Albert Dikwa led to a 0–1 defeat. The following match Louisville played Detroit away. Detroit came into the match on a six-game winless streak and went ahead in the 5th minute on a Ben Morris goal. After halftime Totsch would score an own goal as Louisville failed to find the scoresheet for the second match in a row. Marking the first lose to Detroit in team history. Louisville then returned home to face Birmingham in a match that would mark McCabe's 200th appearance for the club. Louisville took the lead in the 34th minute on a Dylan Mares goal. However, Birmingham would score twice in the second half including a stoppage time goal by Alex Crognale. Leading to Louisville's third consecutive loss. The first three match losing streak since the club's inaugural season. Louisville ended the month of July against the Indy Eleven in the return leg of the LIPAFC rivalry. In front of the largest home crowd of the season to date Wynder and Lancaster both found the back of the net with Oscar Jimenez assisting on both goals. Winning the season series against Indy for the first time 2020. This marked only the third victory over the last 10 matches as Louisville only earned 12 points out of the 30 in June and July.

Louisville opened August on the road against FC Tulsa and turned in what Head Coach Danny Cruz called a true 'Louisville City performance'. Louisville would register three goals while recording a clean sheet for the largest victory of the season to date. This marked the first back-to-back wins of the season since early April as well as the first back-to-back multi goal performances of the season overall. With a goal in the 58th minute Lancaster's became the first Louisville player to score in consecutive games while Semmle set a USL Championship rookie record with his eleventh clean sheet. Louisville followed that performance with two consecutive draws at home. First 1–1 draw in the rain against Charleston followed by a 2–2 draw against Rio Grande. In both matches Louisville would take the lead only to allow game tying goals in the 80th minute. Lancaster scored the lone goal against Charleston creating a streak of three consecutive scoring matches. Against Rio Grande Elijah Wynder scored the Louisville's second goal marking the first time he registered multiple goals in a single season. The draws extended Louisville's unbeaten streak to four. A streak that ended the following on the road against Birmingham. Louisville allowed a goal by Enzo Martínez in the fifth minute followed by a Neco Brett penalty while failing to score goal. The first time Louisville lost multiple games to Birmingham during the same season. Louisville closed out the month of August at home in their first ever match against western conference side Oakland. A Johnny Rodriguez goal right before half time put Oakland ahead while Brian Ownby would score an equalizer in the 71st minute. Eight minutes into stoppage time Oscar Jimenez put Louisville ahead with his first goal of the season leading to a 2–1 victory. While Louisville won the game this marked the fourth consecutive game without a clean sheet. The longest streak of the season to date.

=== September and October ===
Louisville next travelled to Colorado Springs to play the Switchbacks which began a stretch of five matches out of six away from home. Louisville and Colorado exchanged goals in the first half as Gonzalez scored a header off of a corner in the 22nd minute while Romario Williams responded with a goal in the 41st. In the second half Louisville would regain the lead off of another header following a corner in the 49th minute. This time scored by Wynder. Louisville added to their lead in the 88th minute as midseason signing Maarten Pouwels scored his first goal for the club. This goal proved to be vital as Colorado earned a penalty in the 90th minute which was converted by Williams for his second goal of the game. This gave Louisville a 2–3 victory and their first ever victory over Colorado. Louisville then went to Florida to play Tampa Bay in a rematch of the previous three season's Eastern Conference's final as well as Paolo DelPiccolo's 250th appearance in the USL Championship. In this match Tampa Bay went ahead just before halftime while Louisville drew level in the 46th minute as Cal Jennings and Harris exchanged goals. Tampa Bay would regain the lead in the 61st minute when Jennings completed a brace giving Tampa a 2–1 victory. Louisville returned home on September 16 to play San Diego. Louisville's only home match in September. In this match Louisville would immediately take the lead as Harris scored off a rebound of Gonzalez's attempt in the fifth minute. This was only goal of the game as Semmle earned a clean sheet. His first in six matches. Louisville then returned to the road to play Miami FC in what would be the highest scoring match they played this season. The match was a back-and-forth event with Louisville taking one goal leads on three separate occasions only for Miami to score equalizers. Totsch earned a brace after scoring the Louisville's opening goal as well their closing goal when he converted a penalty in the 74th minute. With a goal by Harris sandwiched in between. Totsch would then give up a penalty by tripping Joaquín Rivas in box in the 86th minute. Rivas converted the penalty for his second goal of the game to give Miami a 4–3 victory. Louisville next travelled Leesburg, VA to play Loudoun United in the remnants of Tropical Storm Ophelia. In this match Louisville gave up the opening goal to Zach Ryan in the 20th minute and went into the half trailing 1–0. After the break they drew level as substitute Dylan Mares scored a goal 6 minutes after entering the pitch. Then in stoppage time Mares earned the assist on the game-winning goal by Harris to give Louisville a 1–2 win. With this win Louisville cliched a spot in the USL Playoffs for ninth consecutive season. It was also the 150 league win in club history. Only the third club in league history to reach that mark. Louisville ended September with a match against New Mexico United. Their last game of the season away from home and first ever match in New Mexico. Louisville's performance in the match was described by Head Coach Danny Cruz as a disgrace as Louisville was shut out for the first time in seven games. Ending Harris' four match goal scoring streak. New Mexico scored twice despite have two men sent off. Including a goal by Nicky Hernandez while playing with a one-man disadvantage.

Louisville City closed out the USL season with two home matches. The first being against Hartford Athletic on October 7 and the second against Tampa Bay on October 14. In the match against bottom of the table Hartford both teams would go into the half time scoreless. After the break Rasmus Thellufsen would find the back of the net in the 58th minute. For his first goal both for Louisville City and for an American club. Despite having eight shots on target this was the Louisville's only goal of the game. Meanwhile, Hartford scored an equalizer in the 75th minute leading to the match ending in a 1–1 draw. The first point that Hartford had earned away from home since July 22. The in season finale against Tampa Bay, Louisville immediately fell behind as JJ Williams scored 28 seconds into the match. 18 minutes later Louisville drew level on a Tampa Bay own goal. Only to fall behind again as Cal Jennings scored twice in quick succession. His second brace in as many games against Louisville this season. Lancaster would score his eighth and Louisville final goal of the season in stoppage time. Louisville's only shot on target of the match. However it wasn't enough as Louisville lost 2–3.

Louisville finished the regular season with 50 points and a record of 14–12–8. The first time that they reached double digit losses in team history. Furthermore, their average points per game of 1.47 and goal differential of −3 were record lows for the club while they were shutout a record 9 times. The team finished 5th in their conference and 10th in the league overall. Both the worst such finishes in team history. For the second consecutive Harris was the top goal scorer with 9. The first time in club history that the Louisville failed to have a double-digit goal scorer. On the defensive side of the pitch Semmle set a USL Championship Rookie record with 12 clean sheets. Tied with Charleston's Trey Muse for the most clean sheets in the USL Championship this year as well as the second most clean sheets in team history. Despite these difficulties the team still set a new high in attendance averaging 10,549 fans a game. Besting the previous season's record of 10,465.

=== USL Cup Playoffs ===
For the first time in club history Louisville began the playoffs away from home. Travelling to play a Memphis side who were missing their top two goal scorers in the Conference Quarterfinals. In a repeat of events from their final match of the regular season Louisville immediately fell behind. As Bruno Lapa scored 32 seconds into the match. 18 minutes later Louisville would score an equalizer when Lancaster found the back of the net off of a Moguel corner kick. The scoreline did not change for the rest of the game as the match went into extra time. Following two scoreless extra periods the match went to a Penalty shoot-out. In the shoot-out both Goalkeepers failed to save a penalty as both teams took all five kicks. On Memphis' fifth with Louisville leading by one and needing a conversion to extend the shoot-out Aiden McFadden miss the target as his shot went wide. Giving Louisville a 4–5 shoot-out victory. In the Conference Semi-finals Louisville returned home to play 8th seeded Detroit. Who defeated regular season champions, Pittsburgh, the round before. This match was a one-sided event led by veterans Ownby and Lancaster. In the 14th minutes Ownby was fouled in the box by Michael Bryant allowing Louisville to take the lead as Lancaster converted the ensuing penalty. Ownby himself was the next to find the scoresheet when scored in the 43rd minute despite calls for a handball. In the second half Lancaster and Ownby linked up again when Lancaster chested in an Ownby cross. 92 seconds later Lancaster contributed to another goal as he dispossessed Matt Lewis near midfield and passed it to Gonzalez for Louisville's fourth and final goal. The first time across all competitions this season that Louisville scored four goals. On the other side of the ball Detroit managed one shot on target on six attempts as Semmle earned his first cleansheet in the playoffs as Louisville won 4–0. This sent Louisville to the Eastern Conference finals for the ninth consecutive season. Every year since the formation of the club. For the final they travelled to play USL Championship founding member Charleston in their first ever Eastern Conference finals match. In the match, Louisville conceded the opening in the fifth minute. After Ownby fouled Nick Markanich outside the penalty area giving a Charleston a free kick. Which Arturo Rodríguez was able to put into the back of the net. Charleston would pull farther ahead when Markanich was fouled again. This time in the penalty area by Manny Perez giving Charleston a penalty kick which was successfully converted by Augustine Williams in the 58th minute. Already down two goals Louisville then went down a man when Moguel was shown two yellows in a span of three minutes. Louisville eventually found the score sheet when mid-season signing, Kyle Adams, scored his first goal for club in the 90th minute. However, this wasn't enough as Louisville lost 2–1. Ending their season.

== Current squad ==
As of July 27, 2023

No.	Pos.	Nation	Player
1	GK	USA	Kyle Morton
3	DF	USA	Amadou Dia
4	DF	USA	Sean Totsch
5	MF	DEN	Rasmus Thellufsen
6	DF	USA	Wesley Charpie
8	MF	USA	Carlos Jr. Moguel
9	FW	ESP	Jorge González
10	FW	USA	Brian Ownby
11	MF	IRL	Niall McCabe
12	MF	USA	Tyler Gibson
14	FW	USA	Wilson Harris
15	DF	USA	Manny Perez
17	FW	ENG	Cameron Lancaster
18	GK	USA	Danny Faundez
19	DF	USA	Oscar Jimenez
21	FW	USA	Ray Serrano
22	MF	USA	Dylan Mares
23	MF	USA	Elijah Wynder
28	GK	GER	Oliver Semmle
30	DF	JAM	Jordan Scarlett
32	DF	NZL	Kyle Adams
36	MF	USA	Paolo DelPiccolo
51	DF	USA	Ramzi Qawasmy
66	DF	USA	Joshua Wynder
67	MF	USA	Owen Damm
70	FW	DEN	Maarten Pouwels
70	FW	USA	Isaac Cano
71	FW	USA	Colin Elder
72	DF	USA	Travis Smith

USL Academy Contract

=== Out on loan ===
No.	Pos.	Nation	Player
63	DF	USA	Sebastian Sanchez (on loan to Union Omaha)

== Competitions ==
=== Preseason friendlies ===
January 30	Nashville SC	0–0	Louisville City	Nashville, Tennessee
		Report		Stadium: Geodis Park

February 4	Sporting Kansas City	2–2	Louisville City	Phoenix, Arizona
	Walter 75' (pen.), 90'	Report	Gonzalez 54'; Harris 67'	Stadium: GCU Stadium

February 6	Colorado Springs Switchbacks FC	0–3	Louisville City	Phoenix, Arizona
		Report	Ownby 13'; Damm; Thellufsen	Stadium: Kino Sports Complex; Attendance: 0 (Behind closed doors)
Note: Part of FC Tucson's Desert Showcase

February 6	New Mexico United	2–2	Louisville City	Phoenix, Arizona
	Hamilton 32'; Wehan 51'	Report	Harris 1'; Ownby 74'	Stadium: Kino Sports Complex; Attendance: 0 (Behind closed doors)
Note: Part of FC Tucson's Desert Showcase

February 11	Austin FC	3–1	Louisville City	Austin, TX
	Zardes 17'; Driussi 24'; Fagúndez 90'	Report	Wynder 64'	Stadium: St. David's Performance Center

February 18	Seattle Sounders FC	2–1	Louisville City	Tukwila, Washington
	Héber 6'; Roldan 21'	Report	Mares 70'	Stadium: Starfire Sports; Attendance: 0 (Behind closed doors)

February 25	Louisville City	2–2	One Knoxville SC	Louisville, KY
	Harris 7'; Mushagalusa 20'	Report	Vowinkel 34'; Waldeck 90'	Stadium: Thurman-Hutchins Park

March 4	Pittsburgh Riverhounds SC	0–0	Louisville City	Pittsburgh, Pennsylvania
		Report		Stadium: Highmark Stadium

=== USL Championship ===
==== Standings – Eastern Conference ====
Pos	Team	Pld	W	L	T	GF	GA	GD	Pts	Qualification
1	Pittsburgh Riverhounds SC (S)	34	19	5	10	50	29	+21	67	Playoffs
2	Tampa Bay Rowdies	34	19	9	6	60	39	+21	63	Playoffs
3	Charleston Battery	34	17	9	8	47	43	+4	59	Playoffs
4	Memphis 901 FC	34	14	10	10	59	53	+6	52	Playoffs
5	Louisville City FC	34	14	12	8	41	44	−3	50	Playoffs
6	Indy Eleven	34	13	11	10	46	38	+8	49	Playoffs
7	Birmingham Legion FC	34	14	16	4	44	53	−9	46	Playoffs
8	Detroit City FC	34	11	15	8	30	39	−9	41	Playoffs
9	Miami FC	34	11	15	8	43	44	−1	41	
10	FC Tulsa	34	10	15	9	43	55	−12	39	
11	Loudoun United FC	34	7	23	4	36	61	−25	25	
12	Hartford Athletic	34	4	24	6	40	79	−39	18	

Source: USL Championship Standings
(S) Players' Shield winner

==== Results summary ====
Overall								Home						Away					
Pld	W	D	L	GF	GA	GD	Pts	W	D	L	GF	GA	GD	W	D	L	GF	GA	GD
34	14	8	12	41	44	−3	50	8	3	6	21	20	+1	6	5	6	20	24	−4

Last updated: October 16, 2023.
Source: Match reports

Round	1	2	3	4	5	6	7	8	9	10	11	12	13	14	15	16	17	18	19	20	21	22	23	24	25	26	27	28	29	30	31	32	33	34
Stadium	A	A	H	A	H	H	A	A	H	H	A	A	H	A	H	A	H	H	A	H	H	A	H	H	A	H	A	A	H	A	A	A	H	H
Result	W	W	L	L	W	W	D	D	W	L	W	D	L	D	W	D	W	L	L	L	W	W	D	D	L	W	W	L	W	L	W	L	D	L

Updated to match(es) played on October 16, 2023. Source: Match reports
A = Away; H = Home; W = Win; D = Draw; L = Loss

All times in regular season on Eastern Daylight Time (UTC-04:00) unless otherwise noted

==== Match results ====
March 11 1	Orange County SC	1–3	Louisville City	Irvine, California
10:00 pm EST	Richards (yellow card) 37'; Iloski 40', (yellow card) 45+3'; Partida (yellow card) 41'	Report	McCabe 4'; Lancaster (yellow card) 19', (goal) 57'; Totsch (yellow card) 71'; Mushagalusa 88'	Stadium: Championship Soccer Stadium; Attendance: 4,267; Referee: Ekaterina Koroleva; Assistant referees: Seth Martin; Matthew Schwartz; Fourth official: Adrian Gonzalez

March 18 2	Monterey Bay FC	0–1	Louisville City	Seaside, California
10:00 pm	Boone (yellow card) 22'; Dixon (yellow card) 34'; Murphy (yellow card) 65'	Report	Perez (yellow card) 33'; Ownby 48', (yellow card) 55' (yellow-red card) 67'; Del Piccolo (yellow card) 68'	Stadium: Cardinale Stadium; Attendance: 3,019; Referee: Elton Garcia; Assistant referees: Christian Clerc; Bennett Savage; Fourth official: Alexis Da Silva

March 25 3	Louisville City	0–3	El Paso Locomotive FC	Louisville, Kentucky
3:00 pm	Moguel (yellow card) 41'; Gibson (yellow card) 90+1'	Report	Rose (yellow card) 23'; Navarro 39'; Zacarías 45'; Solignac (yellow card) 52'; Petrović 57'	Stadium: Lynn Family Stadium; Attendance: 10,881; Referee: Elvis Osmanovic; Assistant referees: Chris Schurfranz; Rhett Hammil; Fourth official: Christopher Slane

April 1 4	Sacramento Republic FC	5–0	Louisville City	Sacramento, California
10:00 pm	Felipe 5'; Gurr 24'; Cicerone 28', 71'; Viader (yellow card) 40'; Vitiello (yellow card) 57'; Keko 90+1' (pen.)	Report		Stadium: Heart Health Park; Attendance: 10,881; Referee: Ricardo Fierro; Assistant referees: Bhavik Dutt; Peter Hanson; Fourth official: Adrian Gonzalez

April 8 5	Louisville City	1–0	Detroit City FC	Louisville, Kentucky
3:00 pm	Harris 80'	Report	Rodriguez (yellow card) 45+2'	Stadium: Lynn Family Stadium; Attendance: 9,548; Referee: Sergii Demianchuk; Assistant referees: Tom Felice; Brian Marshall; Fourth official: Jervis Atagana

April 15 6	Louisville City	1–0	San Antonio FC	Louisville, Kentucky
7:30 pm	Harris 23'; Lancaster (yellow card) 78'; Jimenez (yellow card) 90'; Wynder (yellow card) 90+4'	Report	Parano (yellow card) 3'; Bailey (yellow card) 20'; Gomez (yellow card) 58'; Batista (yellow card) 71'; Marcina (yellow card) 76'	Stadium: Lynn Family Stadium; Attendance: 11,589; Referee: Malik Badawi; Assistant referees: Art Arustamyan; Nicholas Balcer; Fourth official: Kevin Fikar

April 22 7	Charleston Battery	0–0	Louisville City	Mount Pleasant, South Carolina
7:30 pm	Williams (yellow card) 7' (yellow-red card) 90'; Allan (yellow card) 81'; Dodson (yellow card) 84'; Trager (yellow card) 86'	Report	Thellufsen (yellow card) 66'; Moguel (yellow card) 88'	Stadium: Patriots Point Soccer Complex; Referee: Calin Radosav; Assistant referees: Jeffrey Skinker; Marcus Moss; Fourth official: John Rush
Note: Kick off was delayed to 8:06 pm due to weather.

April 29 8	Memphis 901 FC	1–1	Louisville City	Memphis, Tennessee
8:00 pm	Fernando 52'	Report	Totsch 9'	Stadium: AutoZone Park; Attendance: 3,644; Referee: Matt Thompson; Assistant referees: Nick Goyette; Michael Mysiewicz; Fourth official: Albert Kyei-Mensah

May 13 9	Louisville City	3–1	Miami FC	Louisville, Kentucky
7:00 pm	Mares 7', (yellow card) 33'; Cruz (yellow card) 24'; Jimenez (yellow card) 31'; Ownby 62'; Totsch 70' (pen.)	Report	Murphy 11' (pen.); Chapman-Page (yellow card) 43'; Akinyode (yellow card) 77'	Stadium: Lynn Family Stadium; Attendance: 11,279; Referee: Elijio Arreguin; Assistant referees: Ethan Buege; Jackson Krauser; Fourth official: Patricia McCracken

May 24 10	Louisville City	1–2	FC Tulsa	Louisville, Kentucky
7:30 pm	Gonzalez 29'; Del Piccolo (yellow card) 33'; Charpie (yellow card) 78'; Dia (yellow card) 90+5'	Report	Fernandez (yellow card) 23'; Bird 77'; Goodrum 89'; Suárez (yellow card) 90+1'; Dyer (yellow card) 90+5'	Stadium: Lynn Family Stadium; Attendance: 11,434; Referee: Abdou Ndiaye; Assistant referees: Jeffrey Skinker; Tom Felice; Fourth official: Benjamin Meyer

May 27 11	Indy Eleven	0–1	Louisville City	Indianapolis, Indiana
7:00 pm	Lindley (yellow card) 11'; Vázquez (yellow card) 29'; Jérôme (yellow card) 77'; Martínez (yellow card) 84'	Report	Harris 20'; Pouwels (yellow card) 90+3'	Stadium: Carroll Stadium; Attendance: 9,532; Referee: Elvis Osmanovic; Assistant referees: Art Arustamyan; Eric Del Rosario; Fourth official: Jackson Krauser

June 3 12	Hartford Athletic	0–0	Louisville City	Hartford, Connecticut
7:00 pm	Hoppenot (yellow card) 76'	Report	Mushagalusa (yellow card) 72'; Gibson (yellow card) 82'	Stadium: Trinity Health Stadium; Attendance: 5,098; Referee: Luis Diego Arroyo; Assistant referees: Mike Nickerson; Patrick Casey; Fourth official: Christian Centeno

June 10 13	Louisville City	1–3	Memphis 901 FC	Louisville, Kentucky
8:00 pm	Damm (yellow card) 17'; Thellufsen (yellow card) 25'; Gibson (yellow card) 55'; Harris 71'	Report	Pickering 45+2'; Ward (yellow card) 60'; Damm 69' (o.g.); Glass (yellow card) 73' da Costa 74'	Stadium: Lynn Family Stadium; Attendance: 10,706; Referee: Eric Tattersall; Assistant referees: Chris Schurfranz; Jacob Little; Fourth official: Kevin Fikar

June 17 14	Phoenix Rising FC	2–2	Louisville City	Phoenix, Arizona
10:30 pm	Harvey 5'; Krutzen (yellow card) 45+2'; Armenakas (yellow card) 53'; Arteaga 74' (pen.)	Report	Totsch 42' (pen.); Mares 57'; Dia (yellow card) 73'; Cruz (yellow card) 90+4'	Stadium: Sky Harbor Stadium; Referee: Sergii Demianchuk; Assistant referees: Matt Trotter; Noah Kenyawani; Fourth official: Killian Richardson

June 24 15	Louisville City	1–0	Las Vegas Lights FC	Louisville, Kentucky
8:00 pm	Serrano (yellow card) 28'; Mares (yellow card) 35'; Mushagalusa 77'	Report	Ledesma (yellow card) 60'; Ingram (yellow card) 65'; Díaz (yellow card) 87'	Stadium: Lynn Family Stadium; Attendance: 10,653; Referee: Melvin Rivas; Assistant referees: Eric Burton; Christian Little; Fourth official: Benjamin Meyer

July 1 16	Pittsburgh Riverhounds SC	0–0	Louisville City	Pittsburgh, Pennsylvania
7:00 pm	Etou (yellow card) 51'; Forbes (yellow card) 51'	Report	Harris (yellow card) 49'; Wynder (yellow card) 64'; Charpie (yellow card) 76'; Lancaster (yellow card) 85'	Stadium: Highmark Stadium; Attendance: 4,435; Referee: Austin Saini; Assistant referees: Nicholas Balcer; Eric Del Rosario; Fourth official: Gary Gutierrez

July 8 17	Louisville City	1–0	Loudoun United FC	Louisville, Kentucky
8:00 pm	Lancaster 53'; McCabe (yellow card) 79'; Dia (yellow card) 90+4'; DelPiccolo (yellow card) 90+6'	Report	Morris (yellow card) 49'; Leerman (yellow card) 71'; Hopkins (yellow card) 81'; Chica (yellow card) 90'	Stadium: Lynn Family Stadium; Attendance: 9,709; Referee: John Matto; Assistant referees: Ethan Buege; Christopher Slane; Fourth official: Rebecca Luther
Note: Kick off was delayed to 9:00 pm due to weather.

July 12 18	Louisville City	0–1	Pittsburgh Riverhounds SC	Louisville, Kentucky
8:00 pm	Moguel (yellow card) 60'	Report	Griffin (yellow card) 51'; Dikwa 68'	Stadium: Lynn Family Stadium; Attendance: 8,882; Referee: Greg Dopka; Assistant referees: Jeremy Smith; Chris Schurfranz; Fourth official: Jackson Krauser

July 19 19	Detroit City FC	2–0	Louisville City	Detroit, Michigan
7:00 pm	Morris 5', (yellow card) 84'; Bryant (yellow card) 45'; Totsch 60' (o.g.); Rodriguez (yellow card) 79'; Steinwascher (yellow card) 90+6'	Report	Jimenez (yellow card) 78'; Charpie (yellow card) 82'; Pouwels (yellow card) 90+6'	Stadium: Keyworth Stadium; Attendance: 6,382; Referee: Alexis Da Silva; Assistant referees: Mike Nickerson; Matthew Seem; Fourth official: Jacob Little

July 22 20	Louisville City	1–2	Birmingham Legion FC	Louisville, Kentucky
8:00 pm	Mares 35', (yellow card) 70'; McCabe (yellow card) 57'; Ownby (yellow card) 67'	Report	Smith (yellow card) 14'; Crognale (yellow card) 19', (goal) 90+2'; Agudelo 55'; Rufe (yellow card) 77'	Stadium: Lynn Family Stadium; Attendance: 9,584; Referee: Abdou Ndiaye; Assistant referees: Austin Holt; Jeffrey Skinker; Fourth official: Alex Beehler

July 29 21	Louisville City	2–0	Indy Eleven	Louisville, Kentucky
8:00 pm	Wynder 28'; Lancaster 65'	Report	Dambrot (yellow card) 61'; Quinn (yellow card) 67'; Diz (yellow card) 86'; Boudadi (yellow card) 90+4'	Stadium: Lynn Family Stadium; Attendance: 13,248; Referee: Ricardo Fierro; Assistant referees: Matthew Rodman; Stephen Milhoan; Fourth official: Zach McWhorter

August 4 22	FC Tulsa	0–3	Louisville City	Tulsa, Oklahoma
9:00 pm	Ruxi (yellow card) 45+7'; Bird (yellow card) 57'; Dyer (yellow card) 68'	Report	Totsch 31', (yellow card) 741'; Thellufsen (yellow card) 45+6'; Lancaster 58'; Charpie (yellow card) 68'; Harris 80'	Stadium: ONEOK Field; Attendance: 4,277; Referee: Joshua Encarnacion; Assistant referees: Art Arustamyan; Jason Guillen; Fourth official: Brandon Queri

August 9 23	Louisville City	1–1	Charleston Battery	Louisville, Kentucky
8:00 pm	Lancaster 67'	Report	Palma (yellow card) 73'; Ycaza 80'	Stadium: Lynn Family Stadium; Attendance: 7,285; Referee: Brandon Stevis; Assistant referees: Nicholas Balcer; Eric Burton; Fourth official: Benjamin Meyer

August 12 24	Louisville City	2–2	Rio Grande Valley FC	Louisville, Kentucky
8:00 pm	Perez (yellow card) 29'; Mares 42', (yellow card) 58'; Wynder 72'	Report	Cabezas 50'; Galindrez 80'; Ackwei (red card) 90+7'	Stadium: Lynn Family Stadium; Attendance: 10,678; Referee: Elton Garcia; Assistant referees: Ben Rigel; Jackson Krauser; Fourth official: Kevin Fikar

August 19 25	Birmingham Legion FC	2–0	Louisville City	Birmingham, Alabama
7:30 pm	Martínez 5'; Brett 24' (pen.); Crognale (yellow card) 46'; Mensah (yellow card) 81'	Report	Jimenez (yellow card) 45+4'; Lancaster (yellow card) 59'; Charpie (yellow card) 90+6'	Stadium: Legion Field; Referee: Matthew Corrigan; Assistant referees: Jeremy Smith; Ethan Buege; Fourth official: Wes Caouette

August 26 26	Louisville City	2–1	Oakland Roots SC	Louisville, Kentucky
7:30 pm	Cruz (yellow card) 45+5'; Ownby 71'; Jimenez 90+8'	Report	Rodriguez 45+6'; Morad (yellow card) 45'; Hackshaw (yellow card) 81'; Blanchette (yellow card) 87'	Stadium: Lynn Family Stadium; Attendance: 10,584; Referee: Abdou Ndiaye; Assistant referees: Tiffini Turpin; Christopher Slane; Fourth official: Matt Geringer

September 2 27	Colorado Springs Switchbacks	2–3	Louisville City	Colorado Springs, Colorado
9:00 pm	Williams 41', 90' (pen.), (yellow card) 59'; Beckford (yellow card) 73'; Skundrich (yellow card) 79'; Hogan (yellow card) 83'	Report	Moguel (yellow card) 4'; Gonzalez 22'; Del Piccolo (yellow card) 42'; Wynder 49'; Serrano (yellow card) 62'; Pouwels 88'; Lancaster (yellow card) 90+3'	Stadium: Weidner Field; Attendance: 7,457; Referee: Gerald Flores; Assistant referees: Ricardo Ocampo; William Aten; Fourth official: Marcelo Soto

September 9 28	Tampa Bay Rowdies	2–1	Louisville City	St. Petersburg, Florida
7:30 pm	Lasso (yellow card) 37'; Jennings 39', 61'; Williams (yellow card) 86'	Report	Moguel (yellow card) 5'; Del Piccolo (yellow card) 21'; Charpie (yellow card) 43'; Harris 46'; Wynder (yellow card) 72'; Adams (yellow card) 77'	Stadium: Al Lang Stadium; Referee: Elijio Arreguin; Assistant referees: Zeno Cho; Diego Lucio; Fourth official: JJ Bilinski

September 16 29	Louisville City	1–0	San Diego Loyal SC	Louisville, Kentucky
7:30 pm	Harris 5'; Charpie (yellow card) 22'; Gibson (yellow card) 73'; Serrano (yellow card) 75'; Perez (yellow card) 87'	Report	Conway (yellow card) 78'	Stadium: Lynn Family Stadium; Attendance: 11,121; Referee: Nabil Bensalah; Assistant referees: Nicholas Balcer; Jacob Little; Fourth official: Noah Matos

September 20 30	Miami FC	4–3	Louisville City	Miami, Florida
7:00 pm	Sorto 32'; Segbers (yellow card) 35'; Rivas 62', 86' (pen.) de Freitas 78'; Repetto (yellow card) 90+3'	Report	Totsch 15', 74' (pen.); Wynder (yellow card) 30'; Harris 48'; Charpie (yellow card) 79'	Stadium: Riccardo Silva Stadium; Attendance: 1,007; Referee: Elvis Osmanovic; Assistant referees: Art Arustamyan; Rhett Hammil; Fourth official: John Ocampo

September 23 31	Loudoun United FC	1–2	Louisville City	Leesburg, Virginia
6:30 pm	Ryan 20'; Turner (yellow card) 32'; Rocha (yellow card) 40'	Report	Adams (yellow card) 39'; Harris (yellow card) 56', (goal) 90+1'; Mares (yellow card) 79', (goal) 74'	Stadium: Segra Field; Attendance: 1,271; Referee: Kyle Johnston; Assistant referees: Amilcar Sicaju; Max Smith; Fourth official: Nick Karnovsky

September 30 32	New Mexico United	2–0	Louisville City	Albuquerque, New Mexico
9:00 pm	Borgelin (yellow card) 15' (yellow-red card) 53'; Swartz 32'; Portillo (yellow card) 59'; Hernandez 74', (yellow card) 70' (yellow-red card) 75'	Report	Moguel (yellow card) 49'	Stadium: Isotopes Park; Attendance: 11,102; Referee: Corbyn May; Assistant referees: Cameron Siler; Benjamin Davis; Fourth official: Osvaldo Delgado Landeros

October 7 33	Louisville City	1–1	Hartford Athletic	Louisville, Kentucky
7:30 pm	Mares (yellow card) 37'; Ownby (yellow card) 45+2'; Thellufsen 58'; Charpie (yellow card) 74'	Report	Makangila (yellow card) 25'; Merrill 75'; Rice (yellow card) 90+4'; Barrera (yellow card) 90+7'	Stadium: Lynn Family Stadium; Attendance: 9,927; Referee: Benjamin Meyer; Assistant referees: Eric Burton; Christian Little; Fourth official: Kevin Fikar

October 14 34	Louisville City	2–3	Tampa Bay Rowdies	Louisville, Kentucky
7:30 pm	Kleemann 19' (o.g.); Ownby (yellow card) 26'; Adams (yellow card) 57'; Lancaster (yellow card) 78', (goal) 90+2'	Report	Williams 1'; Ekra (yellow card) 29'; Jennings 36', 38'; Kleemann (yellow card) 43'; Antley (yellow card) 43'; Areman (yellow card) 82'	Stadium: Lynn Family Stadium; Attendance: 12,230; Referee: Nabil Bensalah; Assistant referees: Eric Del Rosario; Stephen Milhoan; Fourth official: Jackson Krauser

==== USL Cup Playoffs ====
The top eight teams in each USL Championship conference advanced to the 2023 USL Championship Playoffs. Louisville City entered the playoffs as the fifth seed out of the Eastern Conference.

Conference Quarterfinals; October 21–22	Conference Semifinals; October 27–28
E1	Pittsburgh Riverhounds SC	0
E8	Detroit City FC	1
E8	Detroit City FC	0
E5	Louisville City FC	4
E4	Memphis 901 FC	1 (4)
E5	Louisville City FC (p)	1 (5)
Eastern Conference
E3	Charleston Battery	5
E6	Indy Eleven	0
E3	Charleston Battery	2
E7	Birmingham Legion FC	1
E2	Tampa Bay Rowdies	0
E7	Birmingham Legion FC	3
W1	Sacramento Republic FC	1
W8	New Mexico United	0
W1	Sacramento Republic FC	3
W4	San Antonio FC	1
W4	San Antonio FC	1
W5	Colorado Springs Switchbacks	0
Western Conference
W3	San Diego Loyal SC	3
W6	Phoenix Rising FC (a.e.t.)	4
W6	Phoenix Rising FC (a.e.t.)	2
W2	Orange County SC	1
W2	Orange County SC	1
W7	El Paso Locomotive FC	0

Conference Finals; November 4
E5	Louisville City FC	1
E3	Charleston Battery	2
W1	Sacramento Republic FC	1
W6	Phoenix Rising FC	2

USL Championship Final; November 12
E3	Charleston Battery	1 (2)
W6	Phoenix Rising FC (p)	1 (3)

October 21, 2023 Conference Quarter-finals	Memphis 901 FC	1–1 (a.e.t.) (4–5 p)	Louisville City FC	Memphis, Tennessee
6:30 pm EDT	Lapa 1'; Paul (yellow card) 24'; Ward (yellow card) 62'; Kissiedou (yellow card) 73'; Careaga (yellow card) 118'	Report	Lancaster 18'; Semmle (yellow card) 24'; Perez (yellow card) 90+5'; McCabe (yellow card) 117'	Stadium: AutoZone Park; Attendance: 3,587; Referee: Elton García; Assistant referees: Nicholas Balcer; Zach McWhorter; Fourth official: Kevin Broadley
	Penalties
	Hyndman (penalty scored); Molloy (penalty scored); Smith (penalty scored); Careaga (penalty scored); McFadden (penalty missed)		(penalty scored) Totsch; (penalty scored) Harris; (penalty scored) Mares; (penalty scored) McCabe; (penalty scored) Jimenez

October 28, 2023 Conference Semi-finals	Louisville City FC	4–0	Detroit City FC	Louisville, Kentucky
7:30 pm EDT	Lancaster 14' (pen.), 59'; Ownby 43'; Gonzalez 60'	Report	Bryant (yellow card) 14'	Stadium: Lynn Family Stadium; Attendance: 7,959; Referee: Ricardo Fierro; Assistant referees: Ben Rigel; Ricardo Ocampo; Fourth official: Jeremy Scheer

November 4, 2023 Conference Finals	Charleston Battery	2–1	Louisville City FC	Mount Pleasant, South Carolina
7:30 pm EDT	Rodríguez 5' (yellow card) 69'; Williams 58' (pen.); Allan (yellow card) 90+4'	Report	Ownby (yellow card) 4'; Moguel (yellow card) 83' (red card) 86'; Adams 90'; Cruz (yellow card) 90+1'	Stadium: Patriots Point Soccer Complex; Attendance: 4,438; Referee: Elvis Osmanovic; Assistant referees: Seth Barton; Darren Bandy; Fourth official: Matt Thompson

=== U.S. Open Cup ===
As a member of the USL Championship, Louisville City entered the tournament in the Second Round, with their Cup opener played on April 5, 2023. They opened the competition against Lexington SC. The first competitive match against a fellow club from the state of Kentucky. Following their second round win they advanced to play MLS side FC Cincinnati. The first River Cities Cup derby since the 2019. A match they lost 1–0.

April 5 2nd	Louisville City (Kentucky)	1–0	(Kentucky) Lexington SC	Louisville, Kentucky
7:00 pm	Totsch 69'; DelPiccolo (yellow card) 71'	Report	Dlamini (yellow card) 39'; Mohammed (yellow card) 67'; James (yellow card) 80'; Robertson (yellow card) 90+4'	Stadium: Lynn Family Stadium; Attendance: 4,205; Referee: Nabil Bensalah; Assistant referees: Chris Schurfranz; Jackson Krauser; Fourth official: Kevin Kernen

April 26 3rd	FC Cincinnati (Ohio)	1–0	(Kentucky) Louisville City	Cincinnati, OH
7:00 pm	Jimenez (yellow card) 40'; Ordóñez 85'	Report		Stadium: TQL Stadium; Attendance: 10,062; Referee: Calin Radosav; Assistant referees: Michael Nickerson; Zach Mcwhorter; Fourth official: Luke Sobota

== Player statistics ==
=== Goals ===
Place	Pos.	No.	Name	USL	USOC	USL Playoffs	Total
1	FW	17	(England) Cameron Lancaster	8	0	3	11
2	FW	14	(United States) Wilson Harris	9	0	0	9
3	MF	22	(United States) Dylan Mares	5	0	0	5
3	DF	4	(United States) Sean Totsch	4	1	0	5
3	MF	10	(United States) Brian Ownby	3	0	1	5
6	MF	23	(United States) Elijah Wynder	3	0	0	3
6	FW	9	(Spain) Jorge Gonzalez	2	0	1	3
8	FW	77	(Democratic Republic of the Congo) Enoch Mushagalusa	2	0	0	2
9	MF	11	(Republic of Ireland) Niall McCabe	1	0	0	1
9	MF	19	(United States) Oscar Jimenez	1	0	0	1
9	FW	70	(Denmark) Maarten Pouwels	1	0	0	1
9	MF	5	(Denmark) Rasmus Thellufsen	1	0	0	1
9	DF	32	(New Zealand) Kyle Adams	0	0	1	1
Total				40	1	6	47

=== Assists ===
Place	Pos.	No.	Name	USL	USOC	USL Playoffs	Total
1	MF	10	(United States) Brian Ownby	4	0	1	5
2	FW	21	(United States) Ray Serrano	4	0	0	4
2	FW	8	(United States) Carlos Moguel Jr.	3	0	1	4
4	DF	3	(United States) Amadou Dia	3	0	0	3
4	DF	15	(United States) Manny Perez	3	0	0	3
6	MF	19	(United States) Oscar Jimenez	2	0	0	2
6	FW	14	(United States) Wilson Harris	2	0	0	2
6	MF	12	(United States) Tyler Gibson	2	0	0	2
6	MF	22	(United States) Dylan Mares	2	0	0	2
6	FW	17	(England) Cameron Lancaster	1	0	1	2
11	FW	77	(Democratic Republic of the Congo) Enoch Mushagalusa	1	0	0	1
11	MF	67	(United States) Owen Damm	1	0	0	1
11	MF	23	(United States) Elijah Wynder	1	0	0	1
11	MF	36	(United States) Paolo DelPiccolo	0	1	0	1
11	MF	11	(Republic of Ireland) Niall McCabe	1	0	0	1
Total				30	1	3	34

=== Clean sheets ===
Place	Pos.	No.	Name	USL	USOC	USL Playoffs	Total
1	GK	28	(Germany) Oliver Semmle	12	1	1	14
Total				12	1	1	14

=== Disciplinary ===
No.	Pos.	Name	USL		U.S. Open Cup		USL Cup		Total	
No.	Pos.	Name	Booked	Sent off (straight red)	Booked	Sent off (straight red)	Booked	Sent off (straight red)	Booked	Sent off (straight red)
8	MF	(United States) Carlos Moguel Jr.	6	0	0	0	0	1	6	1
10	MF	(United States) Brian Ownby	3	1	0	0	1	0	4	1
6	DF	(United States) Wesley Charpie	9	0	0	0	0	0	9	0
17	FW	(England) Cameron Lancaster	6	0	0	0	0	0	6	0
22	MF	(United States) Dylan Mares	6	0	0	0	0	0	6	0
36	MF	(United States) Paolo DelPiccolo	5	0	1	0	0	0	6	0
19	DF	(United States) Oscar Jimenez	4	0	0	0	0	0	4	0
12	MF	(United States) Tyler Gibson	4	0	0	0	0	0	4	0
23	MF	(United States) Elijah Wynder	4	0	0	0	0	0	4	0
3	DF	(United States) Amadou Dia	3	0	0	0	0	0	3	0
70	FW	(Denmark) Maarten Pouwels	3	0	0	0	0	0	3	0
15	MF	(United States) Manny Perez	3	0	0	0	1	0	4	0
21	FW	(United States) Ray Serrano	3	0	0	0	0	0	3	0
32	DF	(New Zealand) Kyle Adams	3	0	0	0	0	0	3	0
11	MF	(Republic of Ireland) Niall McCabe	2	0	0	0	1	0	3	0
4	DF	(United States) Sean Totsch	2	0	0	0	0	0	2	0
5	MF	(Denmark) Rasmus Thellufsen	2	0	0	0	0	0	2	0
14	FW	(United States) Wilson Harris	2	0	0	0	0	0	2	0
77	FW	(Democratic Republic of the Congo) Enoch Mushagalusa	1	0	0	0	0	0	1	0
4	MF	(United States) Owen Damm	1	0	0	0	0	0	1	0
28	GK	(Germany) Oliver Semmle	0	0	0	0	1	0	1	0
Total			72	1	1	0	4	1	77	2
