= Maarten Pouwels =

Dutch footballer

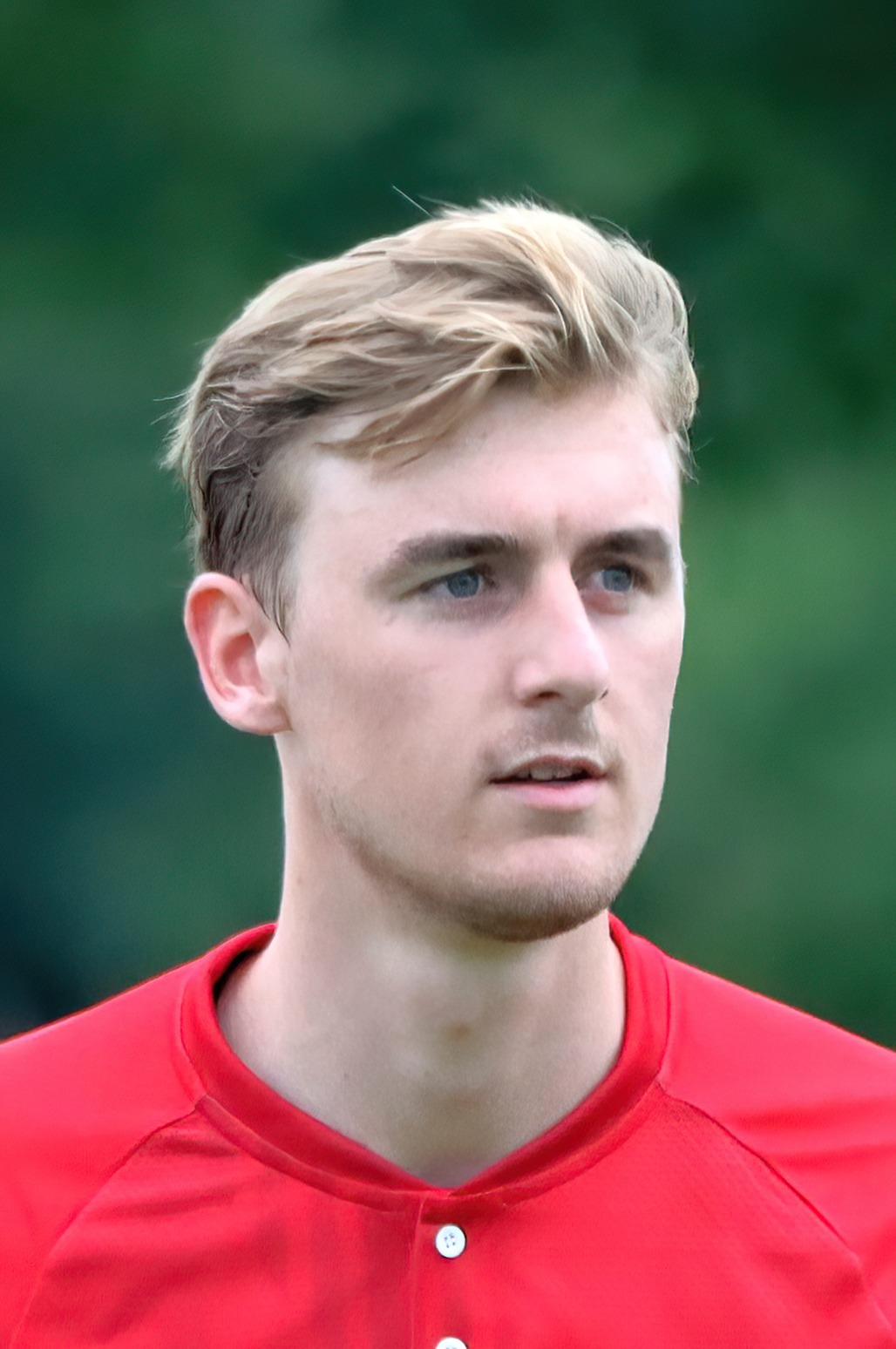

Personal information
- Date of birth: 28 August 1998 (age 28)
- Place of birth: Dalfsen, Netherlands
- Height: 2.00 m (6 ft 7 in)
- Position: Forward

Youth career
- 2005–2018: SV Dalfsen

Senior career*
Years	Team	Apps	(Gls)
2018–2020	Go Ahead Eagles	32	(7)
2020–2021	SC Cambuur	9	(0)
2021–2023	Almere City	48	(7)
2023	Louisville City	16	(1)
2024	Emmen	10	(1)
2025	Waterford	13	(0)
- * Club domestic league appearances and goals as of 09:27, 6 August 2025 (UTC)

Maarten Pouwels (born 28 August 1998) is a Dutch professional footballer who plays as a forward.

== Club career ==
Pouwels played for SV Dalfsen from 2003 to 2018. In the summer of 2018, he joined Go Ahead Eagles on a one-year amateur contract. He made his league debut against Jong FC Utrecht, coming on for Thomas Verheydt fifteen minutes before the end, and made it 4–0 eight minutes before the end from a pass by Jaroslav Navrátil. On 31 August 2018, he replaced Verheydt after sixty-six minutes against MVV Maastricht and scored the winning goal four minutes later, from a pass by Istvan Bakx. He then signed a two-year contract.

When this contract ended, he left the Deventer club. In August, he signed with SC Cambuur for two seasons, with an option for an additional year. Pouwels played nine games for Cambuur, who won the championship and were promoted to the Eredivisie. He did not move up with the club: he was allowed to leave on a free transfer and signed for Almere City.

In May 2023, he joined Louisville City of the USL Championship in the United States. He scored his first goal for the club on 3 September against the Colorado Springs Switchbacks. He left Louisville following the 2023 season.

== Career statistics ==
As of match played 30 May 2025

Appearances and goals by club, season and competition
Club	Season	League			National Cup		Other		Total	
Club	Season	Division	Apps	Goals	Apps	Goals	Apps	Goals	Apps	Goals
Go Ahead Eagles	2018–19	Eerste Divisie	19	3	1	0	2	0	22	3
Go Ahead Eagles	2019–20	Eerste Divisie	13	4	3	0	–		16	4
Go Ahead Eagles	Total		32	7	4	0	2	0	38	7
Cambuur	2020–21	Eerste Divisie	9	0	2	1	–		11	1
Almere City	2021–22	Eerste Divisie	34	7	1	0	–		35	7
Almere City	2022–23	Eerste Divisie	14	0	1	0	0	0	15	0
Almere City	Total		48	7	2	0	0	0	50	7
Louisville City	2023	USL Championship	16	1	0	0	–		16	1
Emmen	2023–24	Eerste Divisie	10	1	0	0	2	0	12	1
Waterford	2025	League of Ireland Premier Division	13	0	0	0	2	0	15	0
Career total			128	15	8	1	4	0	141	18

== Honours ==
Cambuur

- Eerste Divisie: 2020–21
