= Sem de Wit =

Dutch footballer

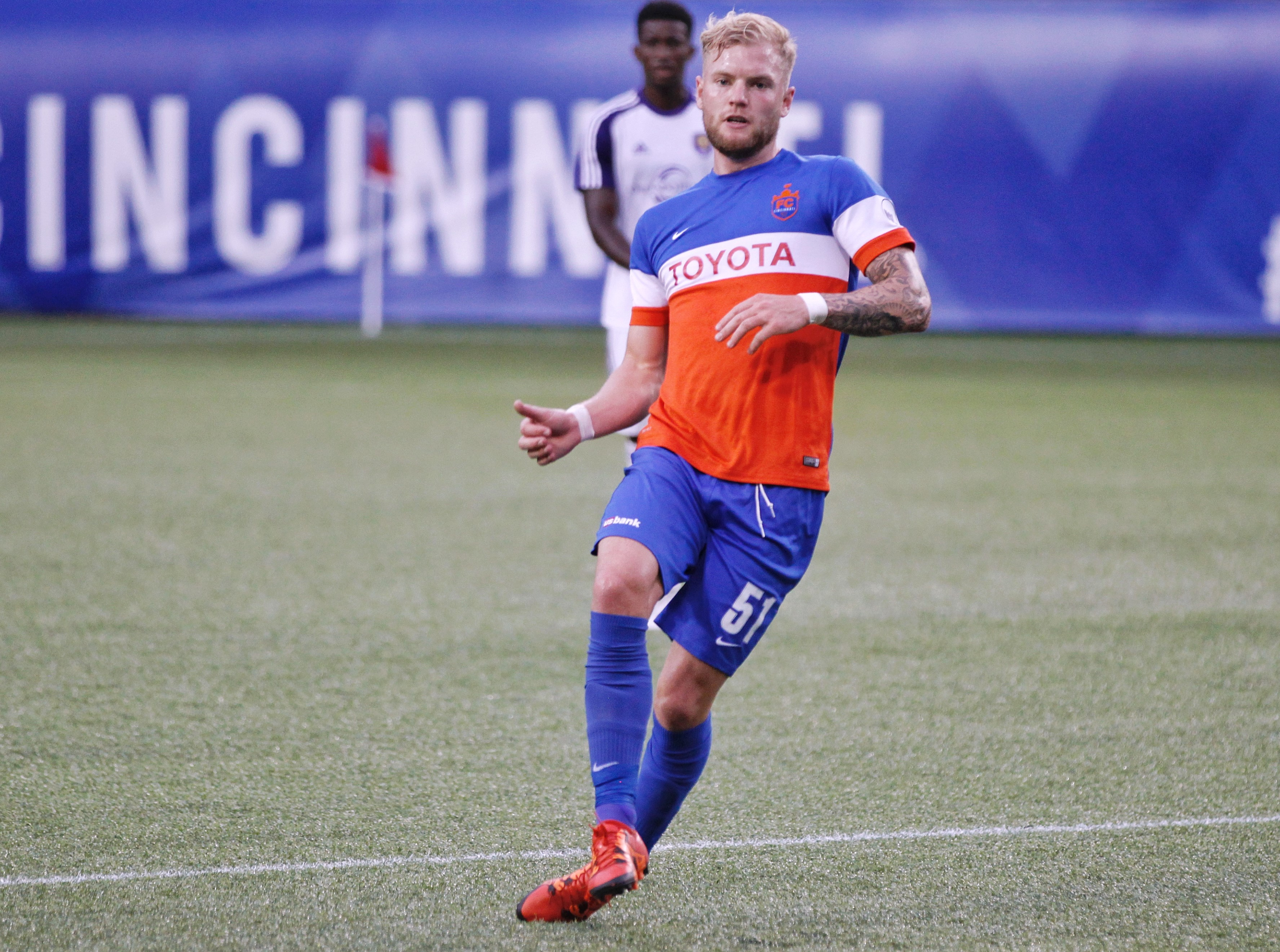

Personal information
- Date of birth: 30 March 1995 (age 31)
- Place of birth: Utrecht, Netherlands
- Height: 1.84 m (6 ft 1/2 in)
- Position: Centre-back

Team information
- Current team: DVS '33
- Number: 21

Youth career
- VV Hierden
- DVS '33
- –2012: Almere City

Senior career*
Years	Team	Apps	(Gls)
2012–2014	Almere City	27	(0)
2014	Dordrecht	0	(0)
2014–2016	ADO Den Haag	0	(0)
2014	→ Dordrecht (loan)	0	(0)
2015	→ Fortuna Sittard (loan)	14	(0)
2016–2017	Whitecaps FC 2	40	(0)
2017	→ Vancouver Whitecaps FC (loan)	0	(0)
2017–2018	FC Cincinnati	12	(1)
2019	Hartford Athletic	33	(1)
2020–2021	SV Straelen	10	(1)
2021–2022	Alhaurín		
2022–2025	DVS '33	91	(8)
Total		227	(11)

International career
2012	Netherlands U18	1	(0)
- * Club domestic league appearances and goals

Sem de Wit (born 30 March 1995) is a Dutch former footballer who plays as a centre-back.

== Career ==
=== Netherlands ===
After playing for various youth teams in the Netherlands, de Wit made his debut for Almere City FC on 14 September 2012 vs. SC Cambuur. Across 2 seasons with Almere City, he made 28 total appearances (27 in the Eerste Divisie).

de Wit then joined ADO Den Haag, and was loaned out to FC Dordrecht. However, he did not make any appearances for Dordrecht's first team. de Wit later joined Fortuna Sittard on loan, where he made 14 appearances in the 2014–15 Eerste Divisie.

=== United States ===
After playing four seasons in the Netherlands, de Wit joined USL club Vancouver Whitecaps 2. He was called up to the first team six times, making his debut in a 2016 friendly against Crystal Palace FC. In 2017, he signed a short-term non-MLS agreement with the club to appear for the club in the Canadian Championship, appearing for the club on 23 May against the Montreal Impact.

de Wit joined FC Cincinnati ahead of the 2017 USL season.

Ahead of their inaugural season in 2019, de Wit joined USL Championship side Hartford Athletic.

=== Germany ===
Ahead of the 2020–21 season, de Wit joined Regionalliga West club SV Straelen.
