= Klisman Sousa =

Cape Verdean footballer

Personal information
- Date of birth: February 12, 1996 (age 30)
- Place of birth: Sal, Cape Verde
- Height: 6 ft 1 in (1.85 m)
- Position: Defender

Team information
- Current team: Fall River FC

College career
| Years | Team | Apps | (Gls) |
| 2015–2018 | Providence Friaers | 55 | (1) |

Senior career*
| Years | Team | Apps | (Gls) |
| 2019 | Hartford Athletic | 0 | (0) |
| 2019 | → FC Tucson (loan) | 2 | (0) |
| 2020– | Fall River FC | | |

International career
| 2022– | United States futsal | 0 | (0) |
- * Club domestic league appearances and goals as of 6 October 2022

Klisman Sousa (born February 12, 1996) is a Cape Verdean professional footballer who plays as a defender who currently plays for amateur club Fall River FC.

== Career ==
=== College ===
Sousa spent all four years of his college career at the Providence College between 2015 and 2018, scoring 1 goal and tallying 6 assists in 55 appearances.

=== Professional ===
On February 21, 2019, Sousa joined USL Championship side Hartford Athletic ahead of their inaugural season.

On April 11, 2019, Sousa was loaned to USL League One side FC Tucson.

=== International ===
In May 2022, Sousa joined the United States national futsal team at training camp in Wesley Chapel, Florida. In October 2022, Sousa was named to the squad for the 2022 Umag Futsal Nations Cup.
