= Carlos Moguel Jr. =

American soccer player (born 2003)

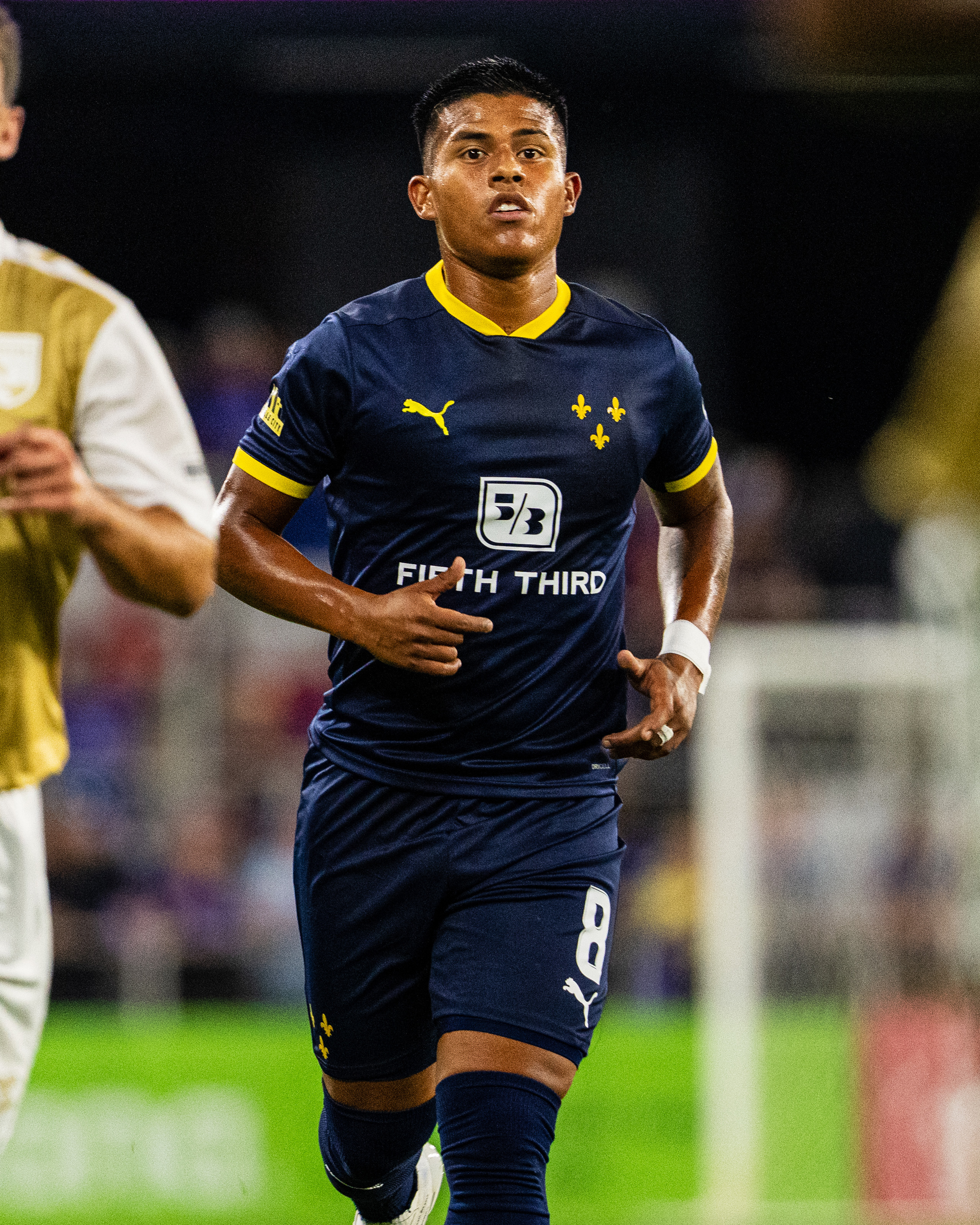
- Moguel Jr. with Louisville City in 2025

Personal information
- Date of birth: June 21, 2003 (age 23)
- Place of birth: Shelbyville, Kentucky, United States
- Height: 5 ft 8 in (1.72 m)
- Position: Midfielder

Team information
- Current team: Louisville City
- Number: 16

Youth career
- –2021: Louisville City

Senior career*
Years	Team	Apps	(Gls)
2021–	Louisville City	59	(1)
2025	→ New Mexico United	6	(1)
- * Club domestic league appearances and goals as of November 7, 2026

Carlos Moguel Jr. (born June 21, 2003) is an American professional soccer player who plays as a midfielder for USL Championship side Louisville City FC.

== Career ==
=== Youth ===
Moguel attended Martha Layne Collins High School in Shelbyville, Kentucky, where he was a Louisville Courier-Journal All-Area nominee and honorable mention to the All-State list. He played as part of the Louisville City academy and went on to sign a USL Academy contract with the club on February 22, 2021, allowing him to retain his NCAA eligibility, but also to play with the club's senior team.

=== Professional ===
==== Louisville City FC ====
On September 27, 2021, Moguel signed a full professional contract with Louisville City to compete in the USL Championship. He made his debut for Louisville on October 23, 2021, appearing as a 79th–minute substitute during a 3–1 win over Memphis 901.

==== New Mexico United ====
On August 26, 2025, New Mexico United announced they had acquired Moguel on loan from Louisville City for the remainder of the 2025 USL Championship season.

== Career statistics ==
As of match played March 1, 2024

Appearances and goals by club, season and competition
Club	Season	League			Cup		Continental		Total	
Club	Season	Division	Apps	Goals	Apps	Goals	Apps	Goals	Apps	Goals
Louisville City FC	2021	USL Championship	1	0	—		—		1	0
Louisville City FC	2022	USL Championship	13	0	3	0	—		16	0
Louisville City FC	2023	USL Championship	22	0	2	0	—		24	0
