= Jacob Lissek =

American soccer player

Personal information
- Date of birth: August 17, 1992 (age 34)
- Place of birth: Highlands Ranch, Colorado, United States
- Height: 6 ft 4 in (1.93 m)
- Position: Goalkeeper

Youth career
- 2008–2010: Colorado Rush

College career
Years	Team	Apps	(Gls)
2010–2013	Fairleigh Dickinson Knights	73	(0)

Senior career*
Years	Team	Apps	(Gls)
2015	Charlotte Independence	0	(0)
2016–2017	Oklahoma City Energy	0	(0)
2017	→ FC Dallas (loan)	0	(0)
2017	FC Dallas	0	(0)
2018	Penn FC	0	(0)
2019	Hartford Athletic	9	(0)

Managerial career
- 2019: Hartford Hawks (assistant)
- 2023–: Denver Pioneers (assistant)
- * Club domestic league appearances and goals as of October 21, 2019

Jacob Lissek
Medal record

Representing United States

Football

Maccabiah Games
Gold medal – first place	2013 Maccabiah	Football

Jacob Lissek (born August 17, 1992) is an American former professional soccer player who plays as a goalkeeper. He played college soccer for Fairleigh Dickinson University, and set the Knights’ all-time career record for shutouts (26). After college, he was with Charlotte Independence, Oklahoma City Energy, FC Dallas (loan), FC Dallas, Penn FC, and Hartford Athletic. Lissek won a gold medal with Team USA at the 2013 Maccabiah Games in Israel.

== Early and personal life ==
Lissek was born in Highlands Ranch, Colorado, to Dan and Ellyn Lissek, and is Jewish. He is 6 feet 4 inches (193 cm) tall.

== Playing career ==
=== High school ===
Lissek attended Rock Canyon High School. In 2008, he and the school's soccer team won the Colorado 4a state championship. That season he was named second team all-league.

=== College ===
Lissek spent all four years of his college career at Fairleigh Dickinson University (Management, '14) between 2010 and 2013, for the Fairleigh Dickinson Knights. Lissek played goalkeeper, and the team won the Northeast Conference (NEC) Championship and reached the third round of the NCAA Tournament in 2012. He holds the Knights’ all-time career record for shutouts (26). He was an NSCAA All-North Atlantic Region Third Team selection his junior year in 2012, when he had a goals-against average of 0.93, was NEC Player of the Week on September 3, 2013, and twice was a member of the NEC All-Tournament Team, and was the NEC Tournament MVP in 2012.

=== Professional ===
Lissek began his professional career with USL Pro side Charlotte Independence when he joined on June 5, 2015. He was with them until March 2016.

Lissek in March 2016 joined USL side Oklahoma City Energy. He was with them until February 2018.

On April 29, 2017, Lissek was loaned to MLS side FC Dallas. Dallas made his loan permanent in April 2017. He was with them until February 2018.

Following his release from Dallas, on February 15, 2018, Lissek signed for Penn FC. He was with them for one season, until January 2019, but did not make a first-team appearance.

On January 30, 2019, Lissek joined USL Championship side Hartford Athletic ahead of their inaugural season. Lissek made his professional debut when he started Hartford's first ever game, a 2–0 loss to Atlanta United 2. He would be in goal for his and the team's first win, in a 2-1 U.S. Open Cup victory over New York Cosmos B on March 15, 2019. Lissek was not re-signed at the end of the 2019 season.

== Coaching career ==
In 2019 he also became the Hartford Hawks' men's soccer team's goalkeeper coach at the University of Hartford.

In 2023, Lissek became the goalkeeper coach for the University of Denver.

== International ==
Lissek played for Team USA at the 2013 Maccabiah Games in Israel. The team won the gold medal, defeating Argentina in the final. Lissek was named the goalkeeper of the tournament.
