= Tyler David =

American soccer player (born 1994)

Personal information
- Date of birth: March 1, 1994 (age 32)
- Place of birth: Lakeville, Minnesota, United States
- Height: 6 ft 2 in (1.88 m)
- Positions: Defender; midfielder

Team information
- Current team: Minneapolis City

Youth career
- 2007–2011: Minnesota Thunder

College career
Years	Team	Apps	(Gls)
2012–2015	Saint Louis Billikens	79	(3)

Senior career*
Years	Team	Apps	(Gls)
2016–2017	Saint Louis FC	50	(1)
2018	BK-46	19	(0)
2019	Hartford Athletic	6	(0)
2020	Union Omaha	13	(0)
2021	Des Moines Menace	2	(0)
2022–	Minneapolis City	1	(0)

Managerial career
- 2022–: Marcy-Holmes Rangers
- * Club domestic league appearances and goals as of June 8, 2023

Tyler David (born March 1, 1994) is an American professional soccer player who plays as a defender for Minneapolis City SC in USL League Two and the National Premier Soccer League. David is also the coach for the Marcy-Holmes Rangers in the Minneapolis City SC Futures League.

== Career ==
=== Amateur ===
From 2007 to 2011, David played for the Minnesota Thunder in the United States Soccer Development Academy, captaining the team all five years.

David played four years of college soccer at Saint Louis University between 2012 and 2015, and was named to the Atlantic 10's All-Conference First Team in his senior season.

=== Professional ===
David was drafted in the fourth round (76th overall) of the 2016 MLS SuperDraft by Vancouver Whitecaps FC. Released by the Whitecaps during training camp without a contract, he then signed with USL side Saint Louis FC on March 6, 2016. David made his debut with the club on March 26, appearing as a substitute in a match against the Real Monarchs.

After a season in Finland with Kakkonen club BK-46, David returned to the United States to join USL Championship side Hartford Athletic ahead of their inaugural season.

On February 17, 2020, David moved to USL League One side Union Omaha ahead of their inaugural season as a club. He was released by Omaha following their 2020 season.

David returned to Minnesota in 2022 to play for Minneapolis City SC and to coach the Marcy-Holmes Rangers in their Futures League. On April 18, 2022, David was voted Futures League Mentor Coach of the Year for leading the Rangers to the championship match.
