= Mads Jørgensen (footballer, born 1998) =

Danish association football player

Personal information
- Date of birth: 5 July 1998 (age 28)
- Place of birth: Odense, Denmark
- Height: 1.88 m (6 ft 2 in)
- Position: Midfielder

Team information
- Current team: Middelfart Boldklub
- Number: 8

Youth career
- –2017: OB

Senior career*
Years	Team	Apps	(Gls)
2017–2019	BK Marienlyst	28	(9)
2019–2020	Hartford Athletic	38	(5)
2021–	Middelfart BK	13	(3)
- * Club domestic league appearances and goals as of 8 July 2021

Mads Jørgensen (born 5 July 1998) is a Danish professional footballer who plays as a midfielder for Danish Second division club Middelfart Boldklub.

== Career ==
Jørgensen played with the Odense Boldklub youth and U19 teams until his contract was transferred to third tier Danish club BK Marienlyst on 1 July 2017. He was named team Captain for the 2018 season at age 19. In January 2019, Jørgensen was released from his contract in order to sign with USL Championship club Hartford Athletic He was second on the team in minutes among midfielders despite missing the last four games of the season with an MCL injury. Soon after the conclusion of the USL 2019 season Hartford re-signed Jørgensen for the 2020 season. For the 2020 season Jørgensen played in twelve matches of the abbreviated season and scored two goals for Hartford.

In February 2021, Jørgensen signed a two-year deal with Middelfart Boldklub of the Danish 2nd Division. He scored his first goal for the club on 20 March 2021 in a 3–0 win vs. Thisted FC.

== Personal life ==
Jørgensen has a large tattoo of his mother on his upper arm. He became a vegetarian in 2019.
