= Nikolaj Lyngø =

Danish footballer (born 1998)

Personal information
- Date of birth: 3 February 1998 (age 28)
- Place of birth: Aalborg, Denmark
- Height: 1.96 m (6 ft 5 in)
- Position: Centre-back

Youth career
- Jetsmark
- Aabybro IF
- Aalborg KFUM
- 2013–2014: Vejle
- 2014–2017: AaB

Senior career*
Years	Team	Apps	(Gls)
2017–2019	AaB	1	(0)
2018	→ Jammerbugt (loan)	16	(2)
2019	Hartford Athletic	10	(0)
2019–2021	Jammerbugt	60	(5)
- * Club domestic league appearances and goals as of 20:33, 20 December 2021 (UTC)

Nikolaj Lyngø (born 3 February 1998) is a Danish footballer who plays as a defender.

== Career ==
After spending a year at Vejle Idrætsefterskole from 2013 to 2014 and playing in the Vejle Boldklub youth academy in the meantime, Lyngø moved to AaB in 2014, where he signed a two-and-a-half year youth contract.

In mid-June 2017, it was announced that Lyngø was promoted to AaB's first team squad on a permanent basis together with U19 teammate Marco Ramkilde. He made his professional debut for AaB on 4 May 2018, when was in the starting lineup and played the entire match in a 2–1 away loss to AC Horsens.

On 3 August 2018, he was sent on a six-month loan to third-tier Danish 2nd Division club Jammerbugt FC until 31 December 2018, when his contract with AaB also expired. He made 16 appearances during the autumn of 2018 and scored two goals for Jammerbugt.

Former AaB player Jimmy Nielsen, stated on 7 November 2018 that he and Hartford Athletic, where he worked as head coach, had brought Lyngø to the American USL Championship. Lyngø signed a one-year agreement with an option for another year. He signed as a free agent, as Lyngø had his contract expire at AaB. He made 10 appearances in the spring of 2019 for Hartford Athletic.

At the beginning of July 2019, Lyngø returned to Jammerbugt after six months in the United States. Upon his return, he signed a one-year contract. Lyngø left Jammerbugt at the end of 2021.
