= 2022 Louisville City FC season =

Louisville City FC
2022 season
- Owner: John Neace
- Manager: Danny Cruz
- Stadium: Lynn Family Stadium
- USL: Eastern Conf.: 1st
- 2022 U.S. Open Cup: Round of 16
- USL Playoffs: Runner-Up
- Top goalscorer: League: Harris (15 goals); All: Harris (17 goals)
- Highest home attendance: 14,673 (8-13 vs. TBR)
- Lowest home attendance: 8,318 (3-12 vs. ATL)
- Average home league attendance: 10,465
- Biggest win: 6–0 (7–9 at NY)
- Biggest defeat: 0–2 (5-21 vs. MB); 1–3 (11/13 at SA)

The 2022 Louisville City FC season was the club's eighth season of competition. Louisville City competes in the USL Championship, the second tier of professional soccer in the United States.

== Background ==
The previous season was impacted by COVID-19 pandemic, though to a lesser extent than the 2020 season. The main alteration was to the regular season schedule, which saw Louisville City play seven division opponents four times each to reduce travel distance and frequency. The U.S. Open Cup was also cancelled for the second straight year due to the effects of the pandemic. Louisville City also began the season with Lynn Family Stadium open to limited capacity crowds, before expanding to maximum capacity on June 12, 2021. Louisville City had its highest attendance of the season on that date with 12,115.

The team won the Central Division with a victory at Birmingham Legion FC on the final matchday of the season, and advanced through the playoffs before falling in extra time to Tampa Bay Rowdies in the Eastern Conference final. Standout right back Jonathan Gómez tallied eight assists and a pair goals on the year. After being named the league's Young Player of the Year and to the All-League First Team at the conclusion of the season, Gómez was transferred to Real Sociedad of Spain's La Liga, Louisville City's first direct transfer to a top-flight European club. Cameron Lancaster led Louisville City in scoring with 21 goals in all comps and was named to the All-League Second Team, while Brian Ownby was the team leader in assists with 10. Defender Sean Totsch was named to the All-League First Team for the second consecutive season.

In addition to Jonathan Gómez's transfer, a number of other players departed the club. Louisville City reloaded from a variety of sources, bringing in players from other USL Championship and Major League Soccer clubs, signing Louisville City Academy players, and picking up free agents from the European and collegiate ranks. Prior season loanee Jorge Gonzalez stayed with the team and signed a contract with Louisville City.

== Current squad ==
As of March 1, 2022

No.	Pos.	Nation	Player
1	GK	USA	Kyle Morton
3	DF	USA	Amadou Dia
4	DF	USA	Sean Totsch
6	DF	USA	Wesley Charpie
7	MF	LES	Napo Matsoso
8	MF	USA	Carlos Moguel Jr.
9	FW	ESP	Jorge González
10	MF	USA	Brian Ownby
11	MF	IRL	Niall McCabe
12	MF	USA	Tyler Gibson
13	MF	USA	Corben Bone
14	FW	USA	Wilson Harris
15	MF	USA	Manny Perez
17	FW	ENG	Cameron Lancaster
19	DF	USA	Oscar Jimenez
21	MF	USA	Ray Serrano
24	GK	USA	Parker Siegfried
30	DF	GER	Jan-Erik Leinhos
32	DF	ESP	Ían Soler
36	MF	USA	Paolo DelPiccolo
66	DF	USA	Joshua Wynder
68	FW	USA	Hunter Sekelsky
77	FW	COD	Enoch Mushagalusa

USL Academy Contract

=== Out on loan ===
No.	Pos.	Player	Nation
18	GK	USA	Danny Faundez (on loan to Northern Colorado Hailstorm)
23	MF	USA	Elijah Wynder (on loan to FC Tucson)
63	DF	USA	Sebastian Sanchez (on loan to South Georgia Tormenta)
67	MF	USA	Owen Damm (on loan to Northern Colorado Hailstorm)

== Competitions ==
=== Preseason friendlies ===
January 30, 2022	Austin FC	v	Louisville City	Austin, Texas
				Stadium: St. David's Performance Center
Note: Result not published

February 5, 2022	Columbus Crew	Canceled	Louisville City	Columbus, Ohio
				Stadium: OhioHealth Performance Center
Note: Match cancelled due to weather conditions

February 12, 2021	Grand Canyon Antelopes	0–3	Louisville City	Phoenix, Arizona
	Mushagalusa; Moguel; Serrano			Stadium: GCU Stadium

February 16, 2022	El Paso Locomotive FC	2–5	Louisville City	Tucson, Arizona
2:00 PM MT/4:00 PM ET	Hinds	Report	Lancaster, Ownby; Gonzalez,	Stadium: Kino Sports Complex

February 19, 2022	Phoenix Rising FC	2–2	Louisville City	Phoenix, Arizona
7:00 PM MT/9:00 PM ET	King 17'; Calistri 65'	Report	DelPiccolo 45+1'; Harris 54'	Stadium: Phoenix Rising Soccer Complex

February 26, 2022	Pittsburgh Riverhounds SC	1–1	Louisville City	Pittsburgh, Pennsylvania
2:00 PM ET	Dixon 31' (pen.)	Report	Harris 12'	Stadium: Highmark Stadium

March 5, 2022	St. Louis City 2	1–0	Louisville City	Maryland Heights, Missouri
3:00 PM CT/4:00 PM ET	Dias 62'	Report		Stadium: Creve Coeur Park Soccer Complex

=== USL Championship ===
==== Standings — Eastern Conference ====
Pos	Team	Pld	W	L	T	GF	GA	GD	Pts	Qualification
1	Louisville City FC	34	22	6	6	65	28	+37	72	Qualification for the Conference Semifinals
2	Memphis 901 FC	34	21	8	5	67	33	+34	68	Playoffs
3	Tampa Bay Rowdies	34	20	7	7	73	33	+40	67	Playoffs
4	Birmingham Legion FC	34	17	10	7	56	37	+19	58	Playoffs
5	Pittsburgh Riverhounds SC	34	16	9	9	50	38	+12	57	Playoffs
6	Miami FC	34	15	9	10	47	32	+15	55	Playoffs
7	Detroit City FC	34	14	8	12	44	30	+14	54	Playoffs
8	FC Tulsa	34	12	16	6	48	58	−10	42	
9	Indy Eleven	34	12	17	5	41	55	−14	41	
10	Hartford Athletic	34	10	18	6	47	57	−10	36	
11	Loudoun United FC	34	8	22	4	36	74	−38	28	
12	Charleston Battery	34	6	21	7	41	77	−36	25	
13	Atlanta United 2	34	6	23	5	39	85	−46	23	
14	New York Red Bulls II	34	3	25	6	24	76	−52	15	

Source: USL Championship Standings

==== Results summary ====
Overall								Home						Away					
Pld	W	D	L	GF	GA	GD	Pts	W	D	L	GF	GA	GD	W	D	L	GF	GA	GD
34	22	6	6	65	28	+37	72	13	2	2	38	14	+24	9	4	4	27	14	+13

Last updated: October 17, 2022.
Source: Match reports

Round	1	2	3	4	5	6	7	8	9	10	11	12	13	14	15	16	17	18	19	20	21	22	23	24	25	26	27	28	29	30	31	32	33	34
Stadium	H	H	A	H	A	A	A	A	H	A	A	H	H	A	H	A	H	H	A	H	A	H	H	A	A	A	H	A	A	H	H	A	H	H
Result	W	W	W	D	D	W	W	D	W	W	L	L	W	L	W	W	W	W	W	D	W	W	W	W	L	L	W	D	D	W	L	W	W	W

Updated to match(es) played on October 17, 2022. Source: Match reports
A = Away; H = Home; W = Win; D = Draw; L = Loss

==== Match results ====
For the 2022 USL Championship season, divisional separation of clubs used in the 2021 season was dropped. Louisville City will compete within the Eastern Conference. They will also face eight cross-conference opponents, most for the first time in competitive matches: LA Galaxy II, Monterey Bay FC, Orange County SC, El Paso Locomotive FC, Sacramento Republic FC, and Rio Grande Valley FC.

March 12 1	Louisville City	1–0	Atlanta United 2	Louisville, Kentucky
7:30 PM ET	Harris (yellow card) 57', (goal) 70'; Wynder (yellow card) 64'	Report	Brick (yellow card) 69'	Stadium: Lynn Family Stadium; Attendance: 8,318; Referee: Melvin Rias; Assistant referees: Matthew Rodman; Chris Schurfranz; Fourth official: Sean Yink-Kehinde

March 19 2	Louisville City	2–0	Miami FC	Louisville, Kentucky
7:30 PM ET	Dia (yellow card) 18'; DelPiccolo (yellow card) 30', (goal) 36'; Gibson (yellow card) 45'; Harris (yellow card) 51'; Matsoso (yellow card) 70'; Ownby 74', (yellow card) 82'	Report	Pérez (yellow card) 10'; Palacios (yellow card) 18'; Williams (yellow card) 53'	Stadium: Lynn Family Stadium; Attendance: 8,846; Referee: Gerald Flores; Assistant referees: Ethan Buege; Erix Burton; Fourth official: Chris Schurfranz

March 23 3	New York Red Bulls II	0–2	Louisville City	Montclair, New Jersey
7:00 PM ET	Castillo (yellow card) 20'; Filipe (yellow card) 62'; Conte (yellow card) 77' (red card) 86'	Report	Serrano 18'; Mushagalusa (yellow card) 57'; Del Piccolo (yellow card) 62'; Morton (yellow card) 63'; Harris 88'	Stadium: MSU Soccer Park at Pittser Field; Attendance: 182; Referee: Adam Kilpatrick; Assistant referees: Ian Mangione; Zeno Cho; Fourth official: Kenneth Rojas

March 26 4	Louisville City	1–1	Indy Eleven	Louisville, Kentucky
7:30 PM ET	Totsch 53'; Ownby (yellow card) 84'; Dia (yellow card) 89'	Report	Pinho 22'; Timmer (yellow card) 34'; Briggs (yellow card) 86'	Stadium: Lynn Family Stadium; Attendance: 8,551; Referee: Eric Tattersall; Assistant referees: Justin Howard; Mike Nickerson; Fourth official: Nabil Bensalah

April 2 5	Birmingham Legion FC	0–0	Louisville City	Birmingham, Alabama
7:30 PM ET	Santos (yellow card) 18'; Kavita (yellow card) 40'	Report	DelPiccolo (yellow card) 28'; Matsoso (red card) 42'; Bone (yellow card) 53'; Totsch (yellow card) 86'	Stadium: Protective Stadium; Attendance: 5,075; Referee: Elton Garcia; Assistant referees: Zach McWhorter; Austin Holt; Fourth official: Jervis Atagana

April 10 6	Loudoun United FC	0–2	Louisville City	Leesburg, Virginia
4:00 PM ET	Ku-Pietro (yellow card) 55'; Diarra (yellow card) 68'	Report	Harris 4'; Wynder (yellow card) 28'; Ownby 53'; Gonzalez (yellow card) 65'; Totsch (yellow card) 75'; Gibson (yellow card) 77'; Mushagalusa (yellow card) 89'	Stadium: Segra Field; Attendance: 1,444; Referee: Luis Arroyo; Assistant referees: Max Smith; William Aten; Fourth official: Joe Franks

April 16 7	San Diego Loyal FC	2–5	Louisville City	San Diego, California
7:00 PM PT/10:00 PM ET	Carleton 14' (pen.), (yellow card) 54'; Fodrey (yellow card) 45+1'; Adams (yellow card) 49'; Vassell 52', (yellow card) 89'; Stoneman (red card) 82'	Report	Harris 4'; Totsch 51' (pen.), (yellow card) 15' (yellow-red card) 56'; Charpie 45+4'; McCabe 83' (pen.); Ownby 90+4'	Stadium: Torero Stadium; Attendance: 3,482; Referee: Michael Radchuk; Assistant referees: Christian Clerc; Hunter Zachwieja; Fourth official: Gustavo Barrientos

April 23 8	Charleston Battery	1–1	Louisville City	Mount Pleasant, South Carolina
5:00 PM ET	Cichero 32'; Weber (yellow card) 34'; Apodaca (yellow card) 71'; Kuzminsky (yellow card) 90+2'	Report	DelPiccolo (yellow card) 59'; Mushagalusa (yellow card) 66', (goal) 73'; Soler (yellow card) 79'	Stadium: Patriots Point Soccer Complex; Attendance: 3,044; Referee: Gabriele Giusti; Assistant referees: Joe Suchoski; Ben Rigel; Fourth official: Izlen Peksenar

April 30 9	Louisville City	2–0	Pittsburgh Riverhounds SC	Louisville, Kentucky
7:30 PM ET	Harris 20'; Mushagalusa 39'	Report	Peters (yellow card) 30'; Ordoñez (yellow card) 49'; D. Kelly (red card) 80'	Stadium: Lynn Family Stadium; Attendance: 11,093; Referee: Elvis Osmanovic; Assistant referees: Walt Heatherly; Chris Schurfranz; Fourth official: Christopher Slane

May 4 10	Atlanta United 2	0–4	Louisville City	Kennesaw, Georgia
7:30 PM ET	Washington (yellow card) 81'; Morales (yellow card) 87'	Report	DelPiccolo 5'; McCabe (yellow card) 27', (goal) 52'; Totsch (yellow card) 36'; Gonzalez 60'; Matsoso 85'	Stadium: Fifth Third Bank Stadium; Attendance: 640; Referee: Kyle Johnston; Assistant referees: Kevin Lock; Zach McWhorter; Fourth official: Madzid Coric

May 13 11	LA Galaxy II	4–3	Louisville City	Carson, California
7:30 PM PT/10:30 PM ET	Dunbar 19', 60'; Doyle (yellow card) 50'; Davila 63' (pen.); Judd (yellow card) 72'; Salazar 76'; Neal (yellow card) 90+2'	Report	Serrano 2'; DelPiccolo (yellow card) 9'; McCabe (yellow card) 17', (goal) 51'; Soler (yellow card) 62'; Harris 76'; Wynder (yellow card) 84'	Stadium: Dignity Health Sports Park; Referee: Ricardo Fierro; Assistant referees: Jennifer Garner; Salvador Reyes; Fourth official: Karen Callado

May 21 12	Louisville City	0–2	Monterey Bay FC	Louisville, Kentucky
7:30 PM ET	Gonzalez (yellow card) 29'; Dia (yellow card) 68'; McCabe (yellow card) 70'; Charpie (yellow card) 78'	Report	Fehr (yellow card) 55', (goal) 58'; Gleadle 77'; Conneh (yellow card) 90+7'	Stadium: Lynn Family Stadium; Attendance: 10,617; Referee: Nabil Bensalah; Assistant referees: Mike Nickerson; Ethan Buege; Fourth official: Chris Schurfranz

May 28 13	Louisville City	4–1	FC Tulsa	Louisville, Kentucky
2:00 PM ET	Gonzalez (yellow card) 34'; Lancaster 45+3' (pen.), (yellow card) 45+5', (goal) 53'; Obinwa 65' (o.g.); Harris 90+2'	Report	Williams (yellow card) 18'; Fenwick (yellow card) 32'; Brown 34', (yellow card) 85'	Stadium: Lynn Family Stadium; Attendance: 9,326; Referee: Thomas Snyder; Assistant referees: Benjamin Meyer; Justin Howard; Fourth official: Erin Patterson

June 5 14	Tampa Bay Rowdies	1–0	Louisville City	St. Petersburg, Florida
7:30 PM ET	Fernandes 43' (pen.); LaCava (yellow card) 70'; Tejada (yellow card) 90'; Guillén (yellow card) 90+2'	Report		Stadium: Al Lang Stadium; Attendance: 4,119; Referee: Matthew Conger; Assistant referees: Jeremy Smith; Rhett Hammil; Fourth official: Jamie Crosby
Note: Match originally scheduled for June 4.

June 18 15	Louisville City	3–1	Orange County SC	Louisville, Kentucky
8:00 PM ET	Mushagalusa 40'; Dia (yellow card) 65'; Totsch 75' (pen.); Harris 85' (pen.); Wynder (yellow card) 87'; Ownby (yellow card) 90+5'; Charpie (yellow card) 90+5'	Report	Pedersen (yellow card) 26'; Skendi (yellow card) 39'; Torres 44'; Osundina (yellow card) 49'; Partida (yellow card) 83'	Stadium: Lynn Family Stadium; Attendance: 10,848; Referee: Kevin Broadley; Assistant referees: Zach McWhorter; Chris Schurfranz; Fourth official: Nabil Bensalah

June 25 16	Hartford Athletic	0–2	Louisville City	Hartford, Connecticut
1:00 PM ET	Barrera (yellow card) 18'; Jadama (yellow card) 55'; Hertzog (yellow card) 82'	Report	Wynder (yellow card) 14'; Totsch 64'; DelPiccolo 79'	Stadium: Dillon Stadium; Referee: Jalen Gray; Assistant referees: Tom Felice; Ian Mangione; Fourth official: Christian Centeno

July 2 17	Louisville City	2–1	Birmingham Legion FC	Louisville, Kentucky
8:00 PM ET	Wynder 32'; Gonzalez (yellow card) 63'; Totsch 83' (pen.); Matsoso (yellow card) 90+7'	Report	Lopez (yellow card) 9' (yellow-red card) 65'; Martínez (yellow card) 33', (goal) 52'; Marlon (yellow card) 57'; Kavita (yellow card) 80'; Crognale (yellow card) 81'	Stadium: Lynn Family Stadium; Attendance: 9,627; Referee: John Griggs; Assistant referees: Eric Burton; Christopher Slane; Fourth official: Kevin Fikar

July 9 18	Louisville City	6–0	New York Red Bulls II	Louisville, Kentucky
8:00 PM ET	Ownby 14', 71'; Gonzalez 23'; Mushagalusa 32', 59', 64'	Report	Knapp (yellow card) 13'	Stadium: Lynn Family Stadium; Attendance: 10,462; Referee: Nabil Bensalah; Assistant referees: Zach McWhorter; Eric del Rosario; Fourth official: Noah Matos

July 16 19	Memphis 901 FC	1–2	Louisville City	Memphis, Tennessee
8:30 PM ET	Seagrist (yellow card) 9' (yellow-red card) 45+1'; Molloy (yellow card) 39'; Goodrum 66', (yellow card) 85'; Kelly (yellow card) 71'; Paul (yellow card) 80'; Muse (red card) 90+3'	Report	Gonzalez (yellow card) 26'; Dia (yellow card) 50' (yellow-red card) 62'; Morton (yellow card) 62'; Ownby 72', 81'	Stadium: AutoZone Park; Attendance: 4,834; Referee: Michael Radchuk; Assistant referees: Chris Schurfranz; Ben Rigel; Fourth official: DeShun Beard

July 20 20	Louisville City	0–0	Phoenix Rising FC	Louisville, Kentucky
7:00 PM ET		Report	Lambert (yellow card) 6'; Njie (yellow card) 37'	Stadium: Lynn Family Stadium; Attendance: 10,494; Referee: Thomas Snyder; Assistant referees: Nicholas Balcer; Mike Nickerson; Fourth official: Youssef Elmessoussi

July 30 21	El Paso Locomotive FC	0–1	Louisville City	El Paso, Texas
9:30 PM ET	Gómez (yellow card) 25'	Report	Gonzalez 52'; Mushagalusa (yellow card) 77'	Stadium: Southwest University Park; Attendance: 6,461; Referee: Gabriele Giusti; Assistant referees: Salma Perez; Francisco Bermudez; Fourth official: Dreaux Plair

August 6 22	Louisville City	4–1	Charleston Battery	Louisville, Kentucky
8:00 PM ET	Ownby 30'; Mushagalusa 52'; Harris 67'; Totsch 89'; Charpie (yellow card) 90+2'	Report	Paterson (yellow card) 35'; Kwakwa (red card) 63'; Pérez (yellow card) 80'	Stadium: Lynn Family Stadium; Attendance: 11,981; Referee: Joshua Encarnacion; Assistant referees: Justin Howard; Eric Burton; Fourth official: Erin Patterson

August 13 23	Louisville City	1–0	Tampa Bay Rowdies	Louisville, Kentucky
7:30 PM ET	Gibson (yellow card) 29'; Harris 63'	Report	Guillén (yellow card) 50'	Stadium: Lynn Family Stadium; Attendance: 14,673; Referee: Natalie Simon; Assistant referees: Ben Pilgrim; Jamie Duling; Fourth official: Jervis Atagana

August 20 24	Detroit City FC	0–1	Louisville City	Hamtramck, Michigan
7:30 PM ET	Bryant (yellow card) 74'	Report	Totsch 66' (pen.); Charpie (red card) 69'; Harris (yellow card) 86' (yellow-red card) 90+4'	Stadium: Keyworth Stadium; Attendance: 6,011; Referee: Matt Thompson; Assistant referees: Art Arustamyan; Nicholas Balcer; Fourth official: Austin Saini
Note: Charpie's Red Card was later rescinded.

August 27 25	Miami FC	1–0	Louisville City	University Park, Florida
7:00 PM ET	Murphy 4'; Craig (yellow card) 82'	Report	DelPiccolo (yellow card) 31'	Stadium: Riccardo Silva Stadium; Attendance: 1,263; Referee: Elton Garcia; Assistant referees: Justin Howard; Corey Wilt; Fourth official: Gabriele Giusti

August 31 26	Indy Eleven	2–1	Louisville City	Indianapolis, Indiana
7:00 PM ET	Pinho (yellow card) 12', (goal) 28', 78' (pen.); Dambrot (yellow card) 45+6'; Hackshaw (yellow card) 68'; Ingram (yellow card) 85'	Report	Serrano 8'; Moguel (yellow card) 13'; Gonzalez (yellow card) 24'; Charpie (yellow card) 57'	Stadium: Carroll Stadium; Attendance: 8,275; Referee: Elvis Osmanovic; Assistant referees: Nicholas Balcer; Eric del Rosario; Fourth official: Youssef Elmessoussi

September 3 27	Louisville City	3–1	Sacramento Republic FC	Louisville, Kentucky
7:30 PM ET	Harris 9'; Dia (yellow card) 24'; Totsch 45', (yellow card) 51'; Ownby (yellow card) 77'; Wynder 87'	Report	Jauregui (yellow card) 27'; Cuello 29'	Stadium: Lynn Family Stadium; Attendance: 9,292; Referee: Kevin Broadley; Assistant referees: Chris Schurfranz; Eric Burton; Fourth official: Christopher Slane

September 7 28	FC Tulsa	2–2	Louisville City	Tulsa, Oklahoma
8:30 PM ET	da Costa 11'; Diz Pe 82'	Report	Mushagalusa 35', 73'; Totsch (yellow card) 88'; Dia (yellow card) 88'	Stadium: Oneok Field; Attendance: 3,013; Referee: Sergii Demianchuk; Assistant referees: Chris Canales; Shane Kennard; Fourth official: Jose Lara

September 10 29	Pittsburgh Riverhounds SC	0–0	Louisville City	Pittsburgh, Pennsylvania
7:00 PM ET		Report	Charpie (yellow card) 15'; Wynder (yellow card) 45'; Jimenz (yellow card) 60'; Gonzalez (yellow card) 73'; DelPiccolo (yellow card) 81'	Stadium: Highmark Stadium; Attendance: 4,233; Referee: Melvin Rivas; Assistant referees: Ethan Buege; Stephen Milhoan; Fourth official: Austin Saini

September 17 30	Louisville City	4–2	Loudoun United FC	Louisville, Kentucky
7:30 PM ET	Mushagalusa 4'; Harris 20'; Totsch 25' (pen.); Ownby 64'; Serrano (red card) 90+2'	Report	Freeman (yellow card) 19'; Ku-DiPietro 44'; Diarra 62', (yellow card) 90+3'; Liadi (yellow card) 88'	Stadium: Lynn Family Stadium; Attendance: 11,345; Referee: Nabil Bensalah; Assistant referees: Noah Kenyawani; Nicholas Balcer; Fourth official: Zach McWhorter

September 23 31	Louisville City	1–2	Memphis 901 FC	Louisville, Kentucky
7:30 PM ET	Mushagalusa (yellow card) 29'; Harris 47'; Gibson (red card) 90+7'	Report	Fernando (yellow card) 29'; Dodson 61'; Smith 90+5'; Logue (yellow card) 90+5'; Goodrum (red card) 90+7'; Buckmaster (red card) 90+7'	Stadium: Lynn Family Stadium; Attendance: 10,808; Referee: Gabriele Giusti; Assistant referees: Matthew Rodman; Mike Nickerson; Fourth official: Eric Burton

October 1 32	Rio Grande Valley FC	0–1	Louisville City	Edinburg, Texas
8:30 PM ET	Pimentel (yellow card) 73'; Pinzón (yellow card) 80'; Ward (yellow card) 90+2'	Report	Harris 32', (yellow card) 76'; Moguel (yellow card) 64'; Pino (yellow card) 86'	Stadium: H-E-B Park; Attendance: 4,748; Referee: Ricardo Fierro; Assistant referees: Tiffini Turpin; Conrado Garcia; Fourth official: Edgar Garcia

October 5 33	Louisville City	2–1	Detroit City FC	Louisville, Kentucky
7:30 PM ET	Harris 61'; Wynder 64'; Lancaster (yellow card) 80'	Report	Wynne (yellow card) 33'; Carroll (yellow card) 34'; Hoppenot 42'; Diop (yellow card) 72'	Stadium: Lynn Family Stadium; Attendance: 9,524; Referee: JC Griggs; Assistant referees: Stephen Milhoan; Noah Matos; Fourth official: Youssef Elmessoussi

October 15 34	Louisville City	2–1	Hartford Athletic	Louisville, Kentucky
7:30 PM ET	Dia (yellow card) 37'; DelPiccolo 45'; Charpie (yellow card) 72'; Totsch (yellow card) 90+1'; Lancaster 90+4' (pen.)	Report	Yacoubou (yellow card) 34'; Prpa (yellow card) 43'; Martínez 74'; McGlynn (yellow card) 80'	Stadium: Lynn Family Stadium; Attendance: 12,096; Referee: Calin Radosav; Assistant referees: Zach McWhorter; Zeno Cho; Fourth official: Benjamin Meyer

==== USL Cup Playoffs ====
The top seven teams in each USL Championship conference advanced to the 2022 USL Championship Playoffs, with the conference winners each receiving a bye to the conference semifinals. Louisville City entered the playoffs as the top seed out of the Eastern Conference.

Conference Quarterfinals; October 22–23	Conference Semifinals; October 28–30
E1	Louisville City FC (p)	2 (5)
E5	Pittsburgh Riverhounds SC	2 (3)
E4	Birmingham Legion FC	2 (7)
E5	Pittsburgh Riverhounds SC (p)	2 (8)
Eastern Conference
E2	Memphis 901 FC	3
E7	Detroit City FC	1
E2	Memphis 901 FC	0
E3	Tampa Bay Rowdies	1
E3	Tampa Bay Rowdies	3
E6	Miami FC	1
W1	San Antonio FC	3
W7	Oakland Roots SC	0
W2	San Diego Loyal SC	0
W7	Oakland Roots SC	3
Western Conference
W3	Colorado Springs Switchbacks FC	3
W6	Rio Grande Valley FC	0
W3	Colorado Springs Switchbacks FC (a.e.t.)	2
W4	Sacramento Republic FC	1
W4	Sacramento Republic FC	2
W5	New Mexico United	0

Conference Finals; November 5–6
E1	Louisville City FC (a.e.t.)	1
E3	Tampa Bay Rowdies	0
W1	San Antonio FC	2
W3	Colorado Springs Switchbacks FC	0

USL Championship Final; November 13
E1	Louisville City FC	1
W1	San Antonio FC	3

October 29 Conference Semi-finals	Louisville City FC	2–2 (a.e.t.) (5–3 p)	Pittsburgh Riverhounds SC	Louisville, Kentucky
7:30 PM EDT	Wynder (yellow card) 28'; Perez 83', (yellow card) 88'; Lancaster 85' (pen.); Dia (yellow card) 155'	Report	Cicerone 14', 47', (yellow card) 103'; Rovira (yellow card) 45+2'; Williams (yellow card) 54'; Wiedt (yellow card) 84'; Dikwa (yellow card) 90+4'	Stadium: Lynn Family Stadium; Attendance: 8,509; Referee: Elijio Arreguin; Assistant referees: Justin Howard; Rhett Hammil; Fourth official: Adam Kilpatrick
	Penalties
	Totsch (penalty scored); Wynder (penalty scored); Jimenez (penalty scored); Matsoso (penalty scored); Moguel (penalty scored)		(penalty missed) Griffin; (penalty scored) Forbes; (penalty scored) Sims; (penalty scored) Dikwa

November 5 Conference finals	Louisville City FC	1–0 (a.e.t.)	Tampa Bay Rowdies	Louisville, Kentucky
7:30 PM EDT	Totsch (yellow card) 48'; Bone (red card) 82'; Charpie (yellow card) 100'; Wynder 108'	Report	Hilton (yellow card) 84'; Harris (yellow card) 90+3'; Dos Santos (yellow card) 106'	Stadium: Lynn Family Stadium; Attendance: 11,563; Referee: Mark Allatin; Assistant referees: Tiffini Turpin; Ricardo Ocampo; Fourth official: Ricardo Fierro

November 13 USL Championship Final	San Antonio FC	3–1	Louisville City FC	San Antonio, Texas
7:30 PM CST	Patiño 45+3' (pen.), 70'; Garcia (yellow card) 47'; Delem (yellow card) 62'; Adeniran 64'	Report	Lancaster (yellow card) 44'; Danny Faundez (yellow card) 61'; Ownby 78'; Mushagalusa (yellow card) 80'	Stadium: Toyota Field; Attendance: 8,534; Referee: Lukasz Szpala; Assistant referees: Kevin Klinger; Ian McKay; Fourth official: Matt Thompson; MVP: Patiño

=== U.S. Open Cup ===
April 6 2nd	Louisville City (Kentucky)	1–0	(Tennessee) Chattanooga Red Wolves SC	Louisville, Kentucky
7:30 PM ET	DelPiccolo (yellow card) 24'; Harris 75', (yellow card) 87'	Report	Bement (yellow card) 43'; Hernández (yellow card) 59'	Stadium: Lynn Family Stadium; Attendance: 4,520; Referee: Nabil Bensalah

April 20 3rd	Louisville City (Kentucky)	0–0 (a.e.t.) (9–8 p)	(Missouri) St. Louis City 2	Louisville, Kentucky
7:30 PM ET		Report		Stadium: Lynn Family Stadium; Referee: Kyle Johnston
	Penalties
	Totsch (penalty scored); Harris (penalty scored); Gonzalez (penalty missed); Matsoso (penalty scored); Moguel (penalty scored); Pino (penalty scored); Serrano (penalty scored); Leinhos (penalty scored); Gibson (penalty scored); Wynder (penalty scored)		(penalty missed) Schneider; (penalty scored) Di Rosa; (penalty scored) Hiebert; (penalty scored) Armstrong; (penalty scored) Yaro; (penalty scored) Rivas; (penalty scored) Heard; (penalty scored) Volmar; (penalty scored) Awuah; (penalty missed) Armstrong

May 10 Round of 32	Detroit City FC (Michigan)	1–1 (a.e.t.) (2–4 p)	(Kentucky) Louisville City FC	Hamtramck, Michigan
7:30 pm EDT	Rodriguez 14' (pen.); Atuahene (yellow card) 44'; Forbes (yellow card) 107'	Report	Harris 24', (yellow card) 52'; Bone (yellow card) 42'; Totsch (yellow card) 110'	Stadium: Keyworth Stadium; Attendance: 6,837; Referee: Calin Radosav
	Penalties
	Rodriguez (penalty scored); Williams (penalty missed); Hoppenot (penalty scored); Carroll (penalty missed)		(penalty scored) Totsch; (penalty scored) McCabe; (penalty scored) Harris; (penalty scored) Pino

May 25 Round of 16	Louisville City FC (Kentucky)	1–2	(Tennessee) Nashville SC (MLS)	Louisville, Kentucky
7:00 pm EDT	Ownby 37'; McCabe (yellow card) 86'; Gonzalez (yellow card) 90+6'	Report	Loba 39'; Haakenson (yellow card) 48'; Mukhtar 89'	Stadium: Lynn Family Stadium; Attendance: 8,638; Referee: Eric Tatersall

== Player statistics ==
=== Goals ===
Place	Pos.	No.	Name	USL	USOC	USL Playoffs	Total
1	FW	14	(United States) Wilson Harris	15	2	0	17
2	MF	10	(United States) Brian Ownby	9	1	1	11
3	FW	77	(Democratic Republic of the Congo) Enoch Mushagalusa	10	0	0	10
4	DF	4	(United States) Sean Totsch	9	0	0	9
5	MF	36	(United States) Paolo DelPiccolo	4	0	0	4
5	FW	17	(England) Cameron Lancaster	3	0	1	4
7	FW	9	(Spain) Jorge Gonzalez Asensi	3	0	0	3
7	MF	11	(Republic of Ireland) Niall McCabe	3	0	0	3
7	MF	21	(United States) Ray Serrano	3	0	0	3
10	DF	66	(United States) Joshua Wynder	2	0	0	2
10	MF	23	(United States) Elijah Wynder	1	0	1	2
12	MF	7	(Lesotho) Napo Matsoso	1	0	0	1
12	DF	6	(United States) Wesley Charpie	1	0	0	1
12	MF	15	(United States) Manny Perez	0	0	1	1
Total				64	3	4	71

=== Assists ===
Place	Pos.	No.	Name	USL	USOC	USL Playoffs	Total
1	DF	2	(United States) Amadou Dia	8	1	0	9
2	MF	11	(Republic of Ireland) Niall McCabe	5	0	0	5
3	MF	10	(United States) Brian Ownby	4	0	0	4
3	MF	13	(United States) Corben Bone	3	1	0	4
5	FW	77	(Democratic Republic of the Congo) Enoch Mushagalusa	3	0	0	3
5	FW	14	(United States) Wilson Harris	3	0	0	3
5	MF	21	(United States) Ray Serrano	3	0	0	3
8	FW	9	(Spain) Jorge Gonzalez Asensi	2	0	0	2
8	MF	15	(United States) Manny Perez	2	0	0	2
8	MF	36	(United States) Paolo DelPiccolo	2	0	0	2
8	DF	6	(United States) Wesley Charpie	1	0	1	2
12	GK	1	(United States) Kyle Morton	1	0	0	1
12	MF	7	(Lesotho) Napo Matsoso	1	0	0	1
12	MF	19	(United States) Oscar Jimenez	1	0	0	1
Total				39	2	1	42

=== Clean sheets ===
Place	Pos.	No.	Name	USL	USOC	USL Playoffs	Total
1	GK	1	(United States) Kyle Morton	13	1	0	14
2	GK	18	(United States) Danny Faundez	2	1	1	4
Total				15	2	1	18

=== Disciplinary ===
No.	Pos.	Name	USL		U.S. Open Cup		USL Cup		Total	
No.	Pos.	Name	Booked	Sent off (straight red)	Booked	Sent off (straight red)	Booked	Sent off (straight red)	Booked	Sent off (straight red)
2	DF	(United States) Amadou Dia	7	1	0	0	1	0	8	1
9	FW	(Spain) Jorge Gonzalez Asensi	7	0	1	0	0	0	8	0
36	MF	(United States) Paolo DelPiccolo	7	0	1	0	0	0	8	0
66	DF	(United States) Joshua Wynder	6	0	0	0	1	0	7	0
4	DF	(United States) Sean Totsch	6	1	1	0	1	0	8	1
6	DF	(United States) Wesley Charpie	6	1	0	0	1	0	7	1
77	FW	(Democratic Republic of the Congo) Enoch Mushagalusa	5	0	0	0	1	0	6	0
10	MF	(United States) Brian Ownby	3	0	0	0	0	0	3	0
11	MF	(Republic of Ireland) Niall McCabe	3	0	1	0	0	0	4	0
12	MF	(United States) Tyler Gibson	3	1	0	0	0	0	3	1
14	FW	(United States) Wilson Harris	3	1	2	0	0	0	5	1
32	DF	(United States) Ían Pino Soler	3	0	0	0	0	0	3	0
8	DF	(United States) Carlos Moguel	2	0	0	0	0	0	2	0
17	FW	(England) Cameron Lancaster	2	0	0	0	1	0	3	0
13	MF	(United States) Corben Bone	2	0	1	0	0	1	3	1
1	GK	(United States) Kyle Morton	2	0	0	0	0	0	2	0
7	MF	(Lesotho) Napo Matsoso	2	1	0	0	0	0	2	1
19	MF	(United States) Oscar Jimenez	1	0	0	0	0	0	1	0
21	MF	(United States) Ray Serrano	0	1	0	0	0	0	0	1
15	MF	(United States) Manny Perez	0	0	0	0	1	0	1	0
18	GK	(United States) Danny Faundez	0	0	0	0	1	0	1	0
Total			70	7	7	0	8	1	85	8
