= 2021 Louisville City FC season =

Louisville City
2021 season
- Owner: John Neace
- Manager: Danny Cruz
- Stadium: Lynn Family Stadium
- USL: Division: 1st Conference: 2nd Overall: 4th
- USL Playoffs: Eastern Conference Finals
- U.S. Open Cup: Not Held
- Top goalscorer: Cameron Lancaster (21)
- Biggest win: LOU 3–0 MEM (6/12); LOU 4–1 SKC (8/7)
- Biggest defeat: All by 1 goal
Home colors	Away colors

The 2021 Louisville City FC season was the club's seventh season of competition. City competed in the USL Championship, the second tier of soccer in the United States.

== Background ==
The previous season was significantly altered due to the COVID-19 pandemic. Louisville City played one match to start the USL Championship season on March 7, 2020, before the season was suspended on March 12, 2020. Louisville City resumed the season on July 12, 2020, under an abbreviated 16-game season instead of 32. Stadium capacity was capped at 4,900; or about 31% of stadium capacity, to enforce social distancing measures.

Louisville City FC finished the truncated 2020 season with a record of 11–2–3, which was good enough to finish in first in Group E, first in the eastern conference, and second overall in the league. City reached the Eastern Conference Final, or semifinals of the USL Championship Playoffs before losing to the Tampa Bay Rowdies.

Cameron Lancaster led Louisville in scoring with 10 goals across all competitions, good enough for the fifth highest goal scoring tally in the league. Lancaster, along with league Goalkeeper of the Year Ben Lundt, defender Sean Totsch, and midfielder Speedy Williams, were named to the All-League First Team.

== Current squad ==
As of June 3, 2021

No.	Position	Nation	Player
1	GK	USA	Chris Hubbard
3	DF	FRA	Alexis Souahy
4	DF	USA	Sean Totsch
6	DF	USA	Wesley Charpie
7	MF	LES	Napo Matsoso
8	DF	USA	Akil Watts
9	FW	ESP	Jorge Gonzalez (on loan from Portland Timbers)
10	MF	USA	Brian Ownby
11	MF	IRL	Niall McCabe
12	MF	USA	Tyler Gibson
13	MF	USA	Corben Bone
14	FW	SEN	Abdou Mbacke Thiam
15	DF	USA	Pat McMahon
16	GK	FRA	Simon Lefebvre
17	FW	ENG	Cameron Lancaster
19	MF	USA	Oscar Jimenez
20	FW	USA	Jimmy McLaughlin
21	FW	USA	Kyle Greig
22	MF	USA	George Davis IV
23	MF	USA	Elijah Wynder
24	GK	USA	Parker Siegfried
29	MF	FRA	Antoine Hoppenot
36	MF	USA	Paolo DelPiccolo
42	DF	USA	Jonathan Gómez
66	DF	USA	Joshua Wynder

== Competitions ==
=== Preseason friendlies ===
March 3, 2021	Louisville City	7–0	Centre Colonels	Louisville, Kentucky
	Lancaster,, Thiam,			Stadium: Louisville City Training Facility; Attendance: 0

March 13, 2021	FC Cincinnati	0–3	Louisville City	Milford, Ohio
1:30 PM EDT			Thiam 37' (pen.); Ownby 63'; Davis IV 85'	Stadium: Mercy Health Training Center; Attendance: 0

March 20, 2021	Nashville SC	4–0	Louisville City	Brentwood, Tennessee
4:30 PM EST	Sapong 7' (Mukhtar); Mukhtar 17' (pen.), 19' (Godoy); Trialist 58' (Haakenson)	NSH Report; LOU Report		Stadium: Jeffrey Kuhn Field at Currey Ingram Academy
Note: Played in three 30-minute periods.

March 25, 2021	Austin FC	v	Louisville City	Austin, Texas
TBD EST				Stadium: Lewis–Chen Family Field
Note: Result not published.

March 28, 2021	Houston Dynamo	2–0	Louisville City	Houston, Texas
2:00 PM EST	Picault 5'; Urruti 27'	LOU Report		Stadium: Houston Sports Park
Note: Extra 25 minutes played after initial 90.

April 3, 2021	Chattanooga FC	2–3	Louisville City	Chattanooga, Tennessee
2:00 PM EST	Hoffstatter 10'; (yellow card) 73'; Hernandez 74' (red card) 86'	Louisville Report; Chattanooga Report	(yellow card) 42'; DelPiccolo 66'; McLaughlin 73'; Lancaster 83'	Stadium: Finley Stadium; Attendance: 1,767

April 7, 2021	Louisville City	v	FC Cincinnati	Louisville, Kentucky
TBA				Stadium: Lynn Family Stadium
Note: Match cancelled by FC Cincinnati

April 11, 2021	Greenville Triumph	2–4	Louisville City FC	Greenville, South Carolina
1:00 PM EST	Lomis,		Lancaster, Ownby; Davis IV	Stadium: Legacy Early College Field

April 16, 2021	Louisville City	2–0	Pittsburgh Riverhounds	Louisville, Kentucky
3:00 PM EST	Jimenez 2'; Bone 80'	USL Report	Perez (penalty missed) 55	Stadium: Lynn Family Stadium

=== USL Championship ===
Louisville City entered the season coached by John Hackworth, who had been at the helm since August 2018. On April 27, 2021, it was announced that Hackworth and Louisville City had mutually terminated Hackworth's contract; Danny Cruz was named the interim head coach. On October 11, 2021, Cruz was named the permanent head coach.

==== Standings — Central Division ====
Pos	Team	Pld	W	L	T	GF	GA	GD	Pts	Qualification
1	Louisville City FC	32	18	7	7	61	37	+24	61	Advance to USL Championship Playoffs
2	Birmingham Legion FC	32	18	8	6	51	31	+20	60	Advance to USL Championship Playoffs
3	Memphis 901 FC	32	14	10	8	47	42	+5	50	Advance to USL Championship Playoffs
4	FC Tulsa	32	14	13	5	49	48	+1	47	Advance to USL Championship Playoffs
5	OKC Energy FC	32	8	11	13	30	38	−8	37	
6	Indy Eleven	32	9	15	8	32	47	−15	35	
7	Atlanta United 2	32	8	14	10	47	56	−9	34 (Note: The USL awarded a 3–0 win to Atlanta United 2 after Sporting Kansas City II fielded Jake Davis who was an ineligible player. The original score was 1–0 for Sporting Kansas City II.)	
8	Sporting Kansas City II	32	4	20	8	33	64	−31	20	

Source: USL

==== Results summary ====
Overall								Home						Away					
Pld	W	D	L	GF	GA	GD	Pts	W	D	L	GF	GA	GD	W	D	L	GF	GA	GD
32	18	7	7	61	37	+24	61	12	2	2	37	17	+20	6	5	5	24	20	+4

Last updated: October 30, 2021.
Source: Match reports

Round	1	2	3	4	5	6	7	8	9	10	11	12	13	14	15	16	17	18	19	20	21	22	23	24	25	26	27	28	29	30	31	32
Stadium	H	H	H	H	A	H	H	A	H	A	A	H	H	A	A	H	H	H	A	A	H	A	A	A	A	A	H	H	A	A	H	A
Result	W	D	W	L	L	W	W	W	D	W	L	W	W	D	W	W	W	W	D	L	L	W	D	W	D	D	W	W	L	L	W	W

Updated to match(es) played on October 30, 2021. Source: Match reports
A = Away; H = Home; W = Win; D = Draw; L = Loss

==== Match results ====
For the 2021 USL Championship season, Louisville City was placed in the Central Division. The club played four matches against each divisional opponent (two home, two away), and four other matches against teams outside the division. Louisville City faced San Diego Loyal SC, Colorado Springs Switchbacks FC, and New Mexico United for the first time in their history. For the first time in their history, Louisville City completed a full-length regular season without a player being sent off, and without a multi-goal loss, accomplishments the team would sustain through the playoff run.

April 24 1	Louisville City FC	2–0	Atlanta United 2	Louisville, Kentucky
7:30 PM ET	Souahy (yellow card) 25'; Totsch (yellow card) 37'; Jimenez (yellow card) 39'; DelPiccolo 69', 87'	Report	Kamdem (yellow card) 33'	Stadium: Lynn Family Stadium; Attendance: 7,652; Referee: Lukasz Szpala; Assistant referees: Walt Heatherly; Chris Schurfranz; Fourth official: Nabil Bensalah

May 8 2	Louisville City FC	1–1	Birmingham Legion FC	Louisville, Kentucky
7:30 PM ET	McMahon 3', (yellow card) 58'; Hubbard (yellow card) 60'; DelPiccolo (yellow card) 61'; Souahy (yellow card) 75'; Gómez (yellow card) 90'	Report	Brett 60' (pen.)	Stadium: Lynn Family Stadium; Attendance: 7,652; Referee: Joshua Encarnacion; Assistant referees: Matthew Rodman; Nicholas Balcer; Fourth official: Nabil Bensalah

May 22 3	Louisville City FC	2–1	San Diego Loyal SC	Louisville, Kentucky
7:30 PM ET	Lancaster 45+3' (pen.); McCabe (yellow card) 45+4'; Matsoso (yellow card) 50'; Grieg 88'	Report	Spencer (yellow card) 45+4'; E. Martin (yellow card) 76'; C. Martin (yellow card) 78'; Donovan (red card) 89'; Blake 90+1'	Stadium: Lynn Family Stadium; Attendance: 7,652; Referee: Ismir Pekmic; Assistant referees: Tyler Wyrostek; Walt Heatherly; Fourth official: Chris Schurfranz

May 29 4	Louisville City FC	1–2	Indy Eleven	Louisville, Kentucky
7:30 PM ET	Lancaster (yellow card) 11'; Bone 45'; DelPiccolo (yellow card) 71'; Hubbard (yellow card) 88'	Report	Hamilton 63' (pen.), 89' (pen.); Seagrist (yellow card) 77'	Stadium: Lynn Family Stadium; Attendance: 10,731; Referee: Elijio Arreguin; Assistant referees: Matthew Rodman; Jeffrey Skinker; Fourth official: Nabil Bensalah

June 6 5	Atlanta United 2	1–0	Louisville City FC	Kennesaw, Georgia
7:30 PM ET	Mertz (yellow card) 17'; McFadden 26'; Mejia (yellow card) 32'; Stanley (yellow card) 44'; Allan (yellow card) 67'; Benítez (yellow card) 78'; Fortune (yellow card) 90+6'	USL Report; Soccerway Rpt	Greig (yellow card) 56'; McCabe (penalty missed) 81'	Stadium: Fifth Third Bank Stadium; Attendance: 835; Referee: Chris Ruska; Assistant referees: Jeremy Smith; Ben Rigel; Fourth official: Madzid Coric

June 12 6	Louisville City FC	3–0	Memphis 901 FC	Louisville, Kentucky
7:30 PM ET	Ownby (yellow card) 22', (goal) 70'; Charpie 58'; Lancaster 68' (pen.); McCabe (yellow card) 72'	Report	Segbers (yellow card) 16'; Thomas (yellow card) 50' (yellow-red card) 57'	Stadium: Lynn Family Stadium; Attendance: 12,115; Referee: Greg Dopka; Assistant referees: Justen Lopez; Mike Nickerson; Fourth official: Chris Schurfranz

June 16 7	Louisville City FC	2–0	Birmingham Legion FC	Louisville, Kentucky
7:30 PM ET	McCabe (yellow card) 24'; Lancaster 25' (pen.); Matsoso 48'	Report	Crognale (yellow card) 90'	Stadium: Lynn Family Stadium; Attendance: 9,576; Referee: Lukasz Szpala; Assistant referees: Matthew Seem; Chris Schurfranz; Fourth official: Michael Samour

June 19 8	FC Tulsa	2–3	Louisville City FC	Tulsa, Oklahoma
7:00 PM CT/8:00 PM ET	da Costa 23'; Marlon 55'; Rivas (yellow card) 60'	Report	Lancaster 2', 10' (pen.); Gómez 7'; McCabe (yellow card) 88'	Stadium: Oneok Field; Attendance: 3,976; Referee: Brandon Stevis; Assistant referees: Francisco Bermudez; Truman Berghall; Fourth official: Connor Stockton

June 26 9	Louisville City FC	3–3	Indy Eleven	Louisville, Kentucky
7:30 PM ET	DelPiccolo 6'; Gómez 14'; Bone (yellow card) 32', (goal) 78'; Hoppenot (yellow card) 70'	Report	Smith 9', (yellow card) 33'; Hackshaw 20'; Arteaga 41'; Vassell (yellow card) 74'	Stadium: Lynn Family Stadium; Attendance: 10,927; Referee: Gabriele Giusti; Assistant referees: Chris Shurfranz; Christopher Slane; Fourth official: Michael Samour

July 2 10	Sporting Kansas City II	2–4	Louisville City FC	Kansas City, Kansas
7:00 PM CT/8:00 PM ET	Duke (yellow card) 21'; R Smith 13'; Mushagalusa (yellow card) 42'; Jones 80'	Report	Greig 5', 67'; Ownby 57'; Souahy 59'; Davis IV (yellow card) 81'	Stadium: Children's Mercy Park; Referee: Kevin Fikar

July 10 11	FC Tulsa	3–2	Louisville City FC	Tulsa, Oklahoma
3:00 PM CT/4:00 PM ET (moved forward from 7:00 PM CT to avoid weather)	Marlon 6'; Kibato 16'; Corrales (yellow card) 22' da Costa 40'; Suarez (yellow card) 65'; Moloto (yellow card) 81'	Report	Hoppenot (yellow card) 5'; Greig 45+1'; Lancaster 61'; Watts (yellow card) 90+1'	Stadium: Oneok Field; Attendance: 3,006; Referee: Matthew Corrigan; Assistant referees: Nicholas Balcer; Shane Kennard; Fourth official: Brandon Queri

July 14 12	Louisville City FC	3–1	OKC Energy FC	Louisville, Kentucky
7:30 PM ET	Charpie 14', (yellow card) 62'; McMahon (yellow card) 19'; Lancaster 41'; Gómez (yellow card) 46'; Bone 55'; DelPiccolo (yellow card) 78'	Report	Donovan (yellow card) 13'; Ward (yellow card) 57'; Bijev 61'	Stadium: Lynn Family Stadium; Attendance: 10,032; Referee: Thomas Snyder; Assistant referees: Tom Felice; Mike Nickerson; Fourth official: Chris Schurfranz

July 17 13	Louisville City FC	2–0	Atlanta United 2	Louisville, Kentucky
7:30 PM ET	Matsoso 54', (yellow card) 73'; McLaughlin 63'; Greig (yellow card) 82'; González (yellow card) 89'	Report	Wiley (yellow card) 34'; McFadden (yellow card) 90'	Stadium: Lynn Family Stadium; Attendance: 11,105; Referee: Gerald Flores; Assistant referees: Matthew Rodman; Chris Schurfranz; Fourth official: Seun Yinka-Kehinde

July 23 14	Colorado Springs Switchbacks FC	1–1	Louisville City FC	Colorado Springs, Colorado
7:00 PM MT/9:00 PM ET	Hodge (yellow card) 33'; Makangila (yellow card) 65'; Mayaka (yellow card) 70'; Ngalina 87'; Lewis (yellow card) 89'	USL Report; Soccerway Rpt	Ownby (yellow card) 31'; Hoppenot (yellow card) 70', (goal) 74'; Greig (yellow card) 79'	Stadium: Weidner Field; Attendance: 6,488; Referee: Jeremy Scheer; Assistant referees: Eric Wood; Matthew Seem; Fourth official: Laura Rodriguez

July 28 15	Sporting Kansas City II	1–2	Louisville City FC	Kansas City, Kansas
7:00 PM CT/8:00 PM ET	Duke (yellow card) 53'; Cisneros 89'; Mushagalusa (yellow card) 90+4'	Report	Gibson (yellow card) 6'; González 46'; Greig 56'; McMahon (yellow card) 72'	Stadium: Children's Mercy Park; Referee: Kevin Broadley

July 31 16	Louisville City FC	2–1	OKC Energy FC	Louisville, Kentucky
7:30 PM ET	Donovan 37' (o.g.); J Wynder (yellow card) 45'; Lancaster 76' (pen.); Gómez (yellow card) 90+2'	Report	Bijev 87' (pen.)	Stadium: Lynn Family Stadium; Attendance: 10,602; Referee: Adam Kilpatrick

August 7 17	Louisville City FC	4–1	Sporting Kansas City II	Louisville, Kentucky
7:30 PM ET	González 45+3'; Ownby 71'; Lancaster 75'; Matsoso (yellow card) 84'; Hoppenot (yellow card) 87'; McLaughlin 90+4'	USL Report; Soccerway Rpt	Jones (yellow card) 9'; Mushagalusa 68'; Davis (yellow card) 89'	Stadium: Lynn Family Stadium; Attendance: 10,470; Referee: Elton García; Assistant referees: Walter Heatherly; Christopher Slane; Fourth official: Noah Matos

August 14 18	Louisville City FC	2–1	FC Tulsa	Louisville, Kentucky
7:30 PM ET	Lancaster 10', 66'; McMahon (yellow card) 66'; Gómez (yellow card) 85'	Report	Sheldon (yellow card) 72'; Moloto (yellow card) 81'; Bourgeois 90+1'; Bird (yellow card) 90+3'	Stadium: Lynn Family Stadium; Attendance: 10,675; Referee: Malik Badawi; Assistant referees: Ben Pilgrim; John Krill; Fourth official: Chris Schurfranz

August 22 19	OKC Energy FC	0–0	Louisville City FC	Oklahoma City, Oklahoma
6:00 PM CT/7:00 PM ET	Ellis-Hayden (yellow card) 45+3'	Report	J. Wynder (yellow card) 53'	Stadium: Taft Stadium; Attendance: 1,993; Referee: Calin Radosav

August 28 20	Birmingham Legion FC	2–1	Louisville City FC	Birmingham, Alabama
6:30 PM CT/7:30 PM ET	Dean (yellow card) 16'; Lopez (yellow card) 44'; Brett 51'; Williams 78'	Report	Watts (yellow card) 50'; DelPiccolo 62'	Stadium: BBVA Field; Referee: Brad Jensen

September 3 21	Louisville City FC	0–1	FC Tulsa	Louisville, Kentucky
TBD CDT	DelPiccolo (yellow card) 68'; Ownby (yellow card) 82'	Report	Suárez 20'; Marlon (yellow card) 47'; Lewis (yellow card) 71'; Da Costa (yellow card) 79'; Fenwick (yellow card) 90+3'	Stadium: Lynn Family Stadium; Attendance: 10,206; Referee: John Matto

September 7 22	Hartford Athletic	2–4	Louisville City FC	Hartford, Connecticut
7:00 PM ET	Obregón Jr. 31'; Dodson 44'; Boudadi (yellow card) 52'	Report	Lancaster 7'; Souahy (yellow card) 19'; Ownby (yellow card) 26', (goal) 56'; González 29'; Totsch (yellow card) 47'; Hoppenot 59', (yellow card) 85'	Stadium: Dillon Stadium; Attendance: 4,159; Referee: Sergii Demianchuk

September 12 23	OKC Energy FC	1–1	Louisville City FC	Oklahoma City, Oklahoma
6:00 PM CT/7:00 PM ET	Ellis-Hayden 25'; Batista (yellow card) 65'	Report	DelPiccolo 45+5', (yellow card) 62'; Davis IV (yellow card) 63'	Stadium: Taft Stadium; Attendance: 1,579; Referee: Matthew Thompson

September 18 24	Indy Eleven	0–2	Louisville City FC	Indianapolis, Indiana
7:00 PM ET	Hackshaw (yellow card) 57'; Arteaga (yellow card) 60'; Timmer (yellow card) 65'; Farr (yellow card) 71'	Report	DelPiccolo (yellow card) 32'; Hoppenot 41'; Lancaster 69'; McCabe (yellow card) 80'; Souahy (yellow card) 83'	Stadium: Carroll Stadium; Attendance: 6,499; Referee: Jeremy Scheer

September 25 25	Memphis 901 FC	1–1	Louisville City FC	Memphis, Tennessee
7:00 PM CT/8:00 PM ET	Murphy 3'; Oduro (yellow card) 55'; Fortune (yellow card) 84'; Segbers (yellow card) 88'	Report	Lancaster 8'; Ownby (yellow card) 23'; DelPiccolo (yellow card) 55'; Hoppenot (yellow card) 64'; Greig (yellow card) 87'	Stadium: AutoZone Park; Attendance: 3,616; Referee: Calin Radosav

September 29 26	Atlanta United 2	1–1	Louisville City FC	Kennesaw, Georgia
7:30 PM ET	Goodrum (yellow card) 31'; Bauer 40'	Report	Lancaster 51'; Gómez (yellow card) 60'; Davis (yellow card) 84'; DelPiccolo (yellow card) 87'	Stadium: Fifth Third Bank Stadium; Attendance: 680; Referee: John Griggs

October 3 27	Louisville City FC	3–1	New Mexico United	Louisville, Kentucky
3:00 PM ET	DelPiccolo 8', 14'; McLaughlin 75'; McCabe (yellow card) 77'; Ownby (yellow card) 84'	Report	Tetteh (yellow card) 24'; Moreno 45+2', (yellow card) 54'; Suggs (yellow card) 74'; Azira (yellow card) 88'	Stadium: Lynn Family Stadium; Attendance: 10,349; Referee: Mark Allatin; Assistant referees: Ben Pilgrim; Chris Schurfranz; Fourth official: Seun Yinka-Kehinde

October 9 28	Louisville City FC	4–3	Sporting Kansas City II	Louisville, Kentucky
7:30 PM ET	DelPiccolo 8'; Totsch (yellow card) 15'; Lancaster 30' (pen.), 90+4'; McLaughlin (yellow card) 82'; Jimenez 88'	Report	Davis (yellow card) 24', (goal) 45+1', 84'; Roberts 85'; Ch. Duke (yellow card) 90+3'	Stadium: Lynn Family Stadium; Attendance: 10,762; Referee: Nabil Bensalah; Assistant referees: Brian Marshall; Amilcar Sicaju; Fourth official: Christopher Slane

October 13 29	Memphis 901 FC	2–1	Louisville City FC	Memphis, Tennessee
7:00 PM CT/8:00 PM ET	Oduro (yellow card) 25'; Salazar 45'; Kissiedou (yellow card) 57'; Fortune (yellow card) 61'; Segbers 78'	LOU Report; USL Report	DelPiccolo 12'; Charpie (yellow card) 30'; J Wynder (yellow card) 35'	Stadium: AutoZone Park; Attendance: 3,034; Referee: Jonathan Bilinski

October 16 30	Indy Eleven	1–0	Louisville City FC	Indianapolis, Indiana
7:00 PM ET	Arteaga 85'; Buckmaster (yellow card) 90+2'	Report	DelPiccolo (yellow card) 43'; Gómez (yellow card) 78'; McCabe (yellow card) 82'	Stadium: Carroll Stadium; Attendance: 6,499; Referee: Ricardo Fierro

October 23 31	Louisville City FC	3–1	Memphis 901 FC	Louisville, Kentucky
7:30 PM ET	Lancaster 21', 45+3', 65' (pen.); Ownby (yellow card) 25'	Report	Dacres (yellow card) 36'; Salazar 41'; Kissiedou (yellow card) 70'	Stadium: Lynn Family Stadium; Attendance: 10,900; Referee: Joshua Encarnacion

October 30 32	Birmingham Legion FC	0–1	Louisville City FC	Birmingham, Alabama
6:30 PM CT/7:30 PM ET	Asiedu (yellow card) 34'; James (yellow card) 87'	Report	Jimenez (yellow card) 38'; Gomez (yellow card) 55'; Gonzalez (yellow card) 75'; Hoppenot 82'	Stadium: BBVA Field; Referee: Matthew Thompson

==== USL Cup Playoffs ====
The top four teams in each of the four USL Championship divisions advanced to the 2021 USL Championship Playoffs. Louisville City entered the playoffs as the top seed out of the Central Division, and second overall seed in the Eastern Conference.

Conference Quarterfinals; November 5–7	Conference Semifinals; November 13
A1	Tampa Bay Rowdies	6
C4	FC Tulsa	2
A1	Tampa Bay Rowdies	1
C2	Birmingham Legion FC	0
C2	Birmingham Legion FC	w/o
A3	Pittsburgh Riverhounds SC
Eastern Conference
A2	Charlotte Independence	3
C3	Memphis 901 FC	1
A2	Charlotte Independence	0
C1	Louisville City FC	1
C1	Louisville City FC	1
A4	Miami FC	0
M1	El Paso Locomotive FC	0
P4	Oakland Roots SC	1
P4	Oakland Roots SC	0 (5)
P2	Orange County SC (p)	0 (6)
P2	Orange County SC	1
M3	Colorado Springs Switchbacks FC	0
Western Conference
M2	San Antonio FC	2
P3	San Diego Loyal SC	0
M2	San Antonio FC	3
M4	Rio Grande Valley FC Toros	1
P1	Phoenix Rising FC	3 (3)
M4	Rio Grande Valley FC Toros (p)	3 (4)

Conference Finals; November 20
A1	Tampa Bay Rowdies (a.e.t.)	3
C1	Louisville City FC	2
P2	Orange County SC (p)	1 (5)
M2	San Antonio FC	1 (3)

USL Championship Final; November 28
A1	Tampa Bay Rowdies	1
P2	Orange County SC	3

November 6 Conf. Quarterfinals	Louisville City FC	1–0	Miami FC	Louisville, Kentucky
8:00 PM ET	Gonzalez 74'; Lancaster (yellow card) 87'; Greig (yellow card) 89'	Report	Craig (yellow card) 24'; Da Silva (yellow card) 72'	Stadium: Lynn Family Stadium; Attendance: 9,097; Referee: Elton Garcia

November 13 Conf. Semifinals	Louisville City FC	1–0	Charlotte Independence	Louisville, Kentucky
7:30 PM ET	DelPiccolo (yellow card) 5'; Ownby (yellow card) 21'; McCabe (yellow card) 44'; Lancaster 89' (pen.)	Report	Kelly (yellow card) 34'; Parra (yellow card) 44'; Riascos (yellow card) 76'; Martínez (yellow card) 87'; Pack (yellow card) 87'; Fuchs (yellow card) 90+2'; Johnson (yellow card) 90+6'	Stadium: Lynn Family Stadium; Attendance: 9,155; Referee: Elijio Arreguin

November 20 Conf. Finals	Tampa Bay Rowdies	3–2 (a.e.t.)	Louisville City FC	St. Petersburg, Florida
7:30 PM ET	Tejada (yellow card) 43'; Dos Santos (yellow card) 77', (goal) 102'; Wyke (yellow card) 83'; Mkosana 83', 90+6'; Guillén (yellow card) 98'	Report	Ownby (yellow card) 5', (goal) 10'; Lasso 23' (o.g.); Gómez (yellow card) 55'; Jimenez (yellow card) 100'	Stadium: Al Lang Stadium; Attendance: 7,120; Referee: Lukasz Szpala

=== U.S. Open Cup ===
On March 29, 2021, the U.S. Soccer Federation announced a truncated format for the 2021 U.S. Open Cup. 16 clubs would participate, each entering at the same time in a Round of 16: 8 from MLS to be determined by league table position after three weeks of play; 4 from the USL Championship, specifically each conference finalist from the 2020 USL Championship Playoffs, including Louisville City; Greenville Triumph SC of USL League One; Detroit City FC of the NISA, and Open Division sides FC Golden State Force and Newtown Pride FC. All non-MLS sides would be drawn against an MLS side for the Round of 16. The competition would begin in May and conclude by the end of June.

On April 16, 2021, the U.S. Soccer Federation announced that the competition would not go forward in the spring as planned, and that it would evaluate holding the competition later in the year.

On July 20, 2021, in conjunction with announcing a tentative schedule for the 2022 U.S. Open Cup, the U.S. Soccer Federation also declared that the 2021 edition of the competition was officially cancelled.

== Player statistics ==
=== Top scorers ===
Place	Pos.	No.	Name	USL	USL Playoffs	Total
1	FW	17	(England) Cameron Lancaster	20	1	21
2	MF	36	(United States) Paolo DelPiccolo	9	0	9
3	FW	21	(United States) Kyle Greig	5	0	5
3	MF	10	(United States) Brian Ownby	4	1	5
5	MF	29	(France) Antoine Hoppenot	4	0	4
5	FW	9	(Spain) Jorge Gonzalez	3	1	4
7	MF	13	(United States) Corben Bone	3	0	3
7	MF	20	(United States) Jimmy McLaughlin	3	0	3
9	DF	42	(United States) Jonathan Gomez	2	0	2
9	DF	6	(United States) Wes Charpie	2	0	2
9	MF	7	(Lesotho) Napo Matsoso	2	0	2
12	DF	15	(United States) Pat McMahon	1	0	1
12	DF	3	(France) Alexis Souahy	1	0	1
12	MF	19	(United States) Oscar Jimenez	1	0	1
-	-	-	Opponent own goals	1	1	2
Total				61	4	65

=== Assist leaders ===
Place	Pos.	No.	Name	USL	USL Playoffs	Total
1	MF	10	(United States) Brian Ownby	10	0	10
2	DF	42	(United States) Jonathan Gomez	8	0	8
3	MF	13	(United States) Corben Bone	6	1	7
4	MF	29	(France) Antoine Hoppenot	4	0	4
4	MF	19	(United States) Oscar Jimenez	3	1	4
6	FW	21	(United States) Kyle Greig	2	0	2
6	MF	11	(Republic of Ireland) Niall McCabe	2	0	2
6	DF	3	(France) Alexis Souahy	2	0	2
6	DF	15	(United States) Pat McMahon	2	0	2
10	MF	22	(United States) George Davis IV	1	0	1
10	MF	36	(United States) Paolo DelPiccolo	1	0	1
10	DF	6	(United States) Wes Charpie	1	0	1
10	DF	8	(United States) Akil Watts	1	0	1
10	FW	14	(Senegal) Abdou Mbacke Thiam	1	0	1
Total				42	2	44

=== Clean sheets ===
Place	Pos.	No.	Name	USL	USL Playoffs	Total
1	GK	1	(United States) Chris Hubbard	6	2	8
2	GK	24	(United States) Parker Siegfried	1	0	1
Total				7	2	9

=== Disciplinary ===
The 2021 season was Louisville City's first full-length campaign without having a player sent off. However, the club accumulated more yellow cards than any previous season.

No.	Pos.	Name	USL	USL Playoffs	Total
No.	Pos.	Name	Booked	Booked	Booked
36	MF	(United States) Paolo DelPiccolo	9	1	10
42	MF	(United States) Jonathan Gómez	8	1	9
10	MF	(United States) Brian Ownby	7	2	9
11	MF	(Republic of Ireland) Niall McCabe	7	1	8
15	DF	(United States) Pat McMahon	6	0	6
29	MF	(France) Antoine Hoppenot	6	0	6
21	FW	(United States) Kyle Greig	4	1	5
3	DF	(France) Alexis Souahy	4	0	4
7	MF	(Lesotho) Napo Matsoso	3	0	3
22	MF	(United States) George Davis IV	3	0	3
4	DF	(United States) Sean Totsch	3	0	3
66	DF	(United States) Joshua Wynder	3	0	3
19	MF	(United States) Oscar Jimenez	2	1	3
1	GK	(United States) Chris Hubbard	2	0	2
8	DF	(United States) Akil Watts	2	0	2
6	DF	(United States) Wes Charpie	2	0	2
9	FW	(Spain) Jorge Gonzalez	2	0	2
17	FW	(England) Cameron Lancaster	1	1	2
13	MF	(United States) Corben Bone	1	0	1
12	MF	(United States) Tyler Gibson	1	0	1
20	MF	(United States) Jimmy McLaughlin	1	0	1
Total			77	8	85
