= Derby City Rovers =

- Full name: Derby City Rovers
- Nickname: Rovers
- Founded: 2010; 16 years ago
- Dissolved: July 2018; 7 years ago
- Stadium: King Louie's Sports Complex
- Head Coach: Lee Chalmers
- League: USL League Two
- 2018: 6th, Great Lakes Division; Playoffs: DNQ
- Website: http://www.roverssoccer.com
Home colors	Away colors

Derby City Rovers were an American semi-professional soccer team based in Louisville, Kentucky, United States. Derby City was also known for their elite-level youth teams that played in local, state, regional and national leagues. Founded in 2010 as the River City Rovers, the team played in USL League Two, the fourth tier of the American Soccer Pyramid.

The team played its home games at the King Louie's Sports Complex located in Louisville. The team's colors were blue, white and gold.

== History ==
River City Rovers was announced as a USL Premier Development League expansion franchise on November 18, 2010. They played their first competitive game on May 19, 2011, a 0–0 tie with fellow expansion team Akron Summit Assault. In May 2014, the club became the Derby City Rovers. Derby City Rovers PDL and Youth Academy ceased operations in July 2018 and there are no plans to return to the pitch.

== Year-by-year ==
Year	Division	League	Regular season	Playoffs	Open Cup
2011	4	PDL	9th, Great Lakes	Did not qualify	Did not qualify
2012	4	PDL	3rd, Great Lakes	Division Semi-final *	Did not qualify
2013	4	PDL	7th, Great Lakes	Did not qualify	1st round
2014	4	PDL	6th, South Atlantic	Did not qualify	Did not qualify
2015	4	PDL	7th, South Atlantic	Did not qualify	Did not qualify
2016	4	PDL	3rd, Great Lakes	Did not qualify	Did not qualify
2017	4	PDL	6th, Great Lakes	Did not qualify	1st round
2018	4	PDL	6th, Great Lakes	Did not qualify	Did not qualify

* Although Rovers qualified for post season play, they ceded the match that was to be played July 17, 2012 to Forest City London.

== Head coaches ==
- (Jamaica) Tyrone Marshall (2014)
- Lee Chalmers (2015–2016)
- Nathan Pitcock (2017)
- Ace Gonya (2018)

== Notable former players ==
- (United States) Andrew Farrell (soccer)
- (Lesotho) Napo Matsoso
- (South Africa) Two-Boys Gumede
- (United States) Trey Muse
- (United States) Chris Hubbard (soccer)
- (United States) Amar Sejdić
- (United States) Paolo DelPiccolo
- (United States) Richard Ballard
- (Finland) Aleksi Pahkasalo
- (Finland) Matias Pyysalo
- (Kenya) Haji Abdikadir
- (United States) Brooks Thompson (soccer)
- (United States) Alejandro García (soccer, born 1994)

== Stadium ==
- Centurion Soccer Fields, Louisville, Kentucky (2011–2014)
- Woehrle Athletic Complex, Jeffersonville, Indiana (2014–2017)
- King Louie's Sports Complex, Louisville, Kentucky (2018)

== See also ==
- Sports in Louisville, Kentucky
