= Kyle Morton =

American soccer player (born 1994)

Personal information
- Full name: Kyle Stuart Morton
- Date of birth: March 31, 1994 (age 32)
- Place of birth: West Chester, Pennsylvania, United States
- Height: 6 ft 4 in (1.93 m)
- Position: Goalkeeper

Youth career
- Philadelphia Union

College career
Years	Team	Apps	(Gls)
2012–2016	James Madison Dukes	69	(0)

Senior career*
Years	Team	Apps	(Gls)
2015	Reading United	11	(0)
2016	Lehigh Valley United	10	(0)
2016	OKC Energy U23	2	(0)
2017	Rochester Rhinos	1	(0)
2018–2019	Pittsburgh Riverhounds	24	(0)
2020	Saint Louis FC	14	(0)
2021	Houston Dynamo	1	(0)
2021	→ Memphis 901 (loan)	5	(0)
2022–2023	Louisville City	31	(0)
- * Club domestic league appearances and goals as of October 18, 2023

Kyle Stuart Morton (born March 31, 1994) is an American professional soccer player who plays as a goalkeeper.

== Career ==
=== College and amateur ===
Morton attended Henderson High School, where he played on the school soccer team and served as the team captain as a senior. He played club soccer for Penn Fusion and also spent time with the Philadelphia Union Academy.

Morton played college soccer at James Madison University between 2012 and 2016, receiving a medical redshirt during 2013. He made third team All-CAA for his final three seasons.

While in college, Morton also played with Premier Development League sides Reading United AC, Lehigh Valley United and OKC Energy U23.

=== Professional ===
==== Rochester Rhinos ====
Morton signed his first professional deal with United Soccer League club Rochester Rhinos on March 7, 2017. He made his Rhinos debut on May 18 in a 3–0 win over FC Motown in a U.S. Open Cup match. That would be his only appearance for Rochester and following the 2017 season, the team decided to go on hiatus.

==== Pittsburgh Riverhounds ====
On January 26, 2018, Morton joined USL side Pittsburgh Riverhounds. He made his Riverhounds debut on April 7, keeping a clean sheet in a 4–0 victory against Toronto FC II. He ended his first season in Pittsburgh with 3 appearances and 3 clean sheets, missing most of the season due to a torn ACL.

In 2018, Morton made 24 appearances in the regular season and kept 13 clean sheets, tied for 2nd most in the league, helping the Riverhounds finish first in the Eastern Conference. He played in both of Pittsburgh's playoff games as the Riverhounds reached the Conference Semifinals, where they lost 2–1 to Louisville City in extra time.

==== Saint Louis FC ====
On January 3, 2020, Morton moved to USL Championship side Saint Louis FC. He made his debut for Saint Louis on March 7, a 4–1 win over Miami FC. In a shortened season due to the COVID-19 pandemic, Morton made 14 appearances and kept 2 clean sheets to help Saint Louis qualify for the playoffs. He played in both of their playoff games as Saint Louis reached the Conference Semifinals, where they lost to Louisville City 2–0. Saint Louis FC folded following the 2020 USL Championship season.

==== Houston Dynamo ====
Morton signed with Major League Soccer side Houston Dynamo on January 27, 2021. On July 9, 2021, Morton was loaned to USL Championship side Memphis 901. He made his debut for Memphis on July 10, making 8 saves and keeping a clean sheet in a 1–0 win over Birmingham Legion. Morton was named USL Championship Player of the Week and made the Team of the Week following his performance against Birmingham. He made 5 appearances while with Memphis, keeping 2 clean sheets. Houston recalled him from his loan on August 18. On November 3, in the final game of Houston's season, Morton made his Dynamo and MLS debut, making 4 saves in a 2–0 loss to CF Montréal. Following the 2021 season, Morton's contract option was declined by Houston.

=== Louisville City FC ===
Morton signed with Louisville City FC on December 28, 2021. He was released by Louisville following the 2023 season.

== Career statistics ==
As of November 10, 2021

Club	Season	League			Open Cup		Playoffs		Continental		Total	
Club	Season	Division	Apps	Goals	Apps	Goals	Apps	Goals	Apps	Goals	Apps	Goals
Reading United	2015	PDL	11	0	0	0	—		—		11	0
Lehigh Valley United	2016	PDL	10	0	0	0	—		—		10	0
OKC Energy U23	2016	PDL	2	0	0	0	2	0	—		4	0
Rochester Rhinos	2017	United Soccer League	0	0	1	0	0	0	—		1	0
Pittsburgh Riverhounds	2018	United Soccer League	3	0	0	0	0	0	—		3	0
Pittsburgh Riverhounds	2019	USL Championship	24	0	2	0	2	0	—		28	0
Pittsburgh Riverhounds	Riverhounds Total		27	0	2	0	2	0	0	0	31	0
Saint Louis FC	2020	USL Championship	14	0	—		2	0	—		16	0
Houston Dynamo	2021	Major League Soccer	1	0	—		—		—		1	0
Memphis 901 (loan)	2021	USL Championship	5	0	—		0	0	—		5	0
Louisville City FC	2022	USL Championship	28	0	4	0	0	0	—		32	0
Career Total			98	0	7	0	6	0	0	0	111	0

== Honors ==
Individual

- USL Championship Golden Glove: 2022
- USL Championship All League Second Team : 2022

== Personal life ==
Morton attended Henderson High School, where he played on the school soccer team as well as on the school football team as kicker. He attended James Madison University, where he majored in kinesiology.

His brother is fellow professional soccer goalkeeper, Todd Morton, who currently plays for Philadelphia Union II.
