= Joshua Wynder =

American soccer player (born 2005)

- Wynder in 2026

Personal information
- Full name: Joshua Liam Wynder
- Date of birth: May 2, 2005 (age 21)
- Place of birth: Louisville, Kentucky, United States
- Height: 6 ft 2 in (1.88 m)
- Position: Center-back

Team information
- Current team: New England Revolution (on loan from Benfica)
- Number: 66

Youth career
- 2020–2021: Louisville City

Senior career*
Years	Team	Apps	(Gls)
2021–2023	Louisville City	38	(2)
2023–2025	Benfica B	32	(4)
2025–	Benfica	0	(0)
2026–	→ New England Revolution (loan)	5	(1)

International career^{‡}
2022	United States U17	1	(0)
2022	United States U19	5	(0)
2023–2025	United States U20	15	(1)
- * Club domestic league appearances and goals as of October 15, 2026 ‡ National team caps and goals as of October 10, 2025

Joshua Liam Wynder (born May 2, 2005) is an American professional soccer player who plays as a center-back for Major League Soccer club New England Revolution, on loan from Primeira Liga club Benfica.

== Club career ==
Wynder signed a USL Academy contract with USL Championship side Louisville City in February 2021. On June 3, 2021, Wynder signed a professional deal with the club.

On June 8, 2023, Wynder joined Portuguese club Benfica for a fee of $1.2 million and add-ons, the largest transfer fee to date for a USL player. He was initially assigned to the B team, competing in Liga Portugal 2.

On September 3, 2026, Wynder joined Major League Soccer club New England Revolution on loan through the end of the 2027 Sprint Season. He made his Revolution debut on September 13, coming on as a 69th-minute substitute for Jackson Yueill in a 2–1 win over Chicago Fire FC. He scored his first goal for the Revolution on October 14 in a 3–2 victory over FC Cincinnati.

== International career ==
In April 2022, Wynder was selected for the 33-player USYNT U-19 squad. The then 17-year old Wynder captained the side in his debut win over England.

Wynder played in four of the five United States games in the 2023 FIFA U-20 World Cup. The U.S. exited the tournament in the quarterfinals with a 0–2 loss against Uruguay.

In April 2023, Wynder was selected in the 23-man roster for the men's national team friendly against Mexico, which ended in a 1–1 draw. He did not feature in the game itself.

== Personal life ==
Joshua's brother, Elijah, plays for LA Galaxy.

== Career statistics ==
=== Club ===
As of match played May 11, 2025

Appearances and goals by club, season and competition
Club	Season	League			National cup (Note: Includes U.S. Open Cup, Taça de Portugal)		League cup		Continental		Other		Total	
Club	Season	Division	Apps	Goals	Apps	Goals	Apps	Goals	Apps	Goals	Apps	Goals	Apps	Goals
Louisville City	2021	USL Championship	11	0	—		—		—		—		11	0
Louisville City	2022	USL Championship	21	2	3	0	—		—		3 (Note: Appearances in USL Championship play-offs)	0	27	2
Louisville City	2023	USL Championship	6	0	—		—		—		—		6	0
Louisville City	Total		38	2	3	0	—		—		3	0	44	2
Benfica B	2023–24	Liga Portugal 2	1	0	—		—		—		—		1	0
Benfica B	2024–25	Liga Portugal 2	31	4	—		—		—		—		31	4
Benfica B	Total		32	4	—		—		—		—		32	4
Benfica	2024–25	Primeira Liga	0	0	1	0	0	0	0	0	0	0	1	0
Career total			70	6	4	0	0	0	0	0	3	0	77	6
