= Ian Pino =

Spanish footballer

Ian Soler
Personal information
- Full name: Ian Soler Pino
- Date of birth: 23 January 1996 (age 30)
- Place of birth: Prats de Lluçanès, Spain
- Height: 1.88 m (6 ft 2 in)
- Position: Midfielder

Youth career
- Damm
- 2013–2014: Espanyol
- 2014–2015: Almería
- 2015–2016: Fulham

Senior career*
Years	Team	Apps	(Gls)
2016–2017	Jumilla	9	(0)
2017–2019	Málaga B	23	(0)
2019–2021	Zemplín Michalovce	42	(2)
2021–2022	Zagłębie Lubin	9	(0)
2022–2023	Louisville City	14	(0)
2023	Riteriai	16	(1)
2024	Alessandria	15	(1)
2024–2026	Tirana	47	(1)
2026–	Drenica	0	(0)
- * Club domestic league appearances and goals as of 3 May 2024

Ian Soler Pino (born 23 January 1996) is a Spanish footballer who plays as a midfielder.

== Club career ==
Born in Prats de Lluçanès, Barcelona, Catalonia, Pino represented Damm, Espanyol and Almería before moving abroad with Fulham on 5 September 2015. After only playing for the club's under-23 squad, he returned to his home country the following July after agreeing to a contract with Segunda División B side Jumilla.

Pino made his senior debut on 11 September 2016, coming on as a substitute in a 2–0 home win against Real Murcia. On 11 January of the following year, he moved to Málaga and was assigned to the reserves in Tercera División.

Pino scored his first senior goal on 22 January 2017, netting his team's fourth in a 4–3 defeat of Motril. He made his first team debut on 28 November, starting in a 1–1 home draw against Numancia for the season's Copa del Rey.

On 18 February 2022, Soler signed with USL Championship side Louisville City. On 9 March 2023, Soler and Louisville mutually agreed to terminate his contract to allow him to return to Europe.

In March 2023 he signed with Lithuanian Riteriai Club. On 15 March 2023 he made his A Lyga debut against Dainava. On 22 October 2023, he scored against Banga. On 16 November 2023 it was announced he would leave the club.

== Career statistics ==
As of match played 3 November 2024

Appearances and goals by club, season and competition
Club	Season	League			National cup (Note: Includes Copa del Rey, Slovak Cup, Polish Cup, U.S. Open Cup, Lithuanian Cup, Coppa Italia, Albanian Cup)		Continental		Other		Total	
Club	Season	Division	Apps	Goals	Apps	Goals	Apps	Goals	Apps	Goals	Apps	Goals
Jumilla	2016-17	Segunda División B	9	0	—		—		—		9	0
Málaga	2017-18	La Liga	0	0	1	0	—		—		1	0
Málaga B	2018-19	Segunda División B	23	0	—		—		—		23	0
Zemplín Michalovce	2019-20	Slovak 1st League	14	1	0	0	—		0	0	14	1
Zemplín Michalovce	2020-21	Slovak 1st League	28	1	1	0	—		—		29	1
Zemplín Michalovce	Total		42	2	1	0	—		0	0	43	2
Zagłębie Lubin	2021-22	Ekstraklasa	9	0	1	0	—		—		10	0
Louisville City	2022	USL Championship	14	0	3	0	—		0	0	17	0
Riteriai	2023	A Lyga	16	1	1	0	—		—		17	1
Alessandria	2023-24	Serie C	15	1	0	0	—		—		15	1
Tirana	2024-25	Kategoria Superiore	12	0	0	0	2 (Note: Appearance(s) in UEFA Europa Conference League)	0	—		14	0
Career total			140	4	7	0	2	0	0	0	149	4
