= Elijah Wynder =

American soccer player (born 2003)

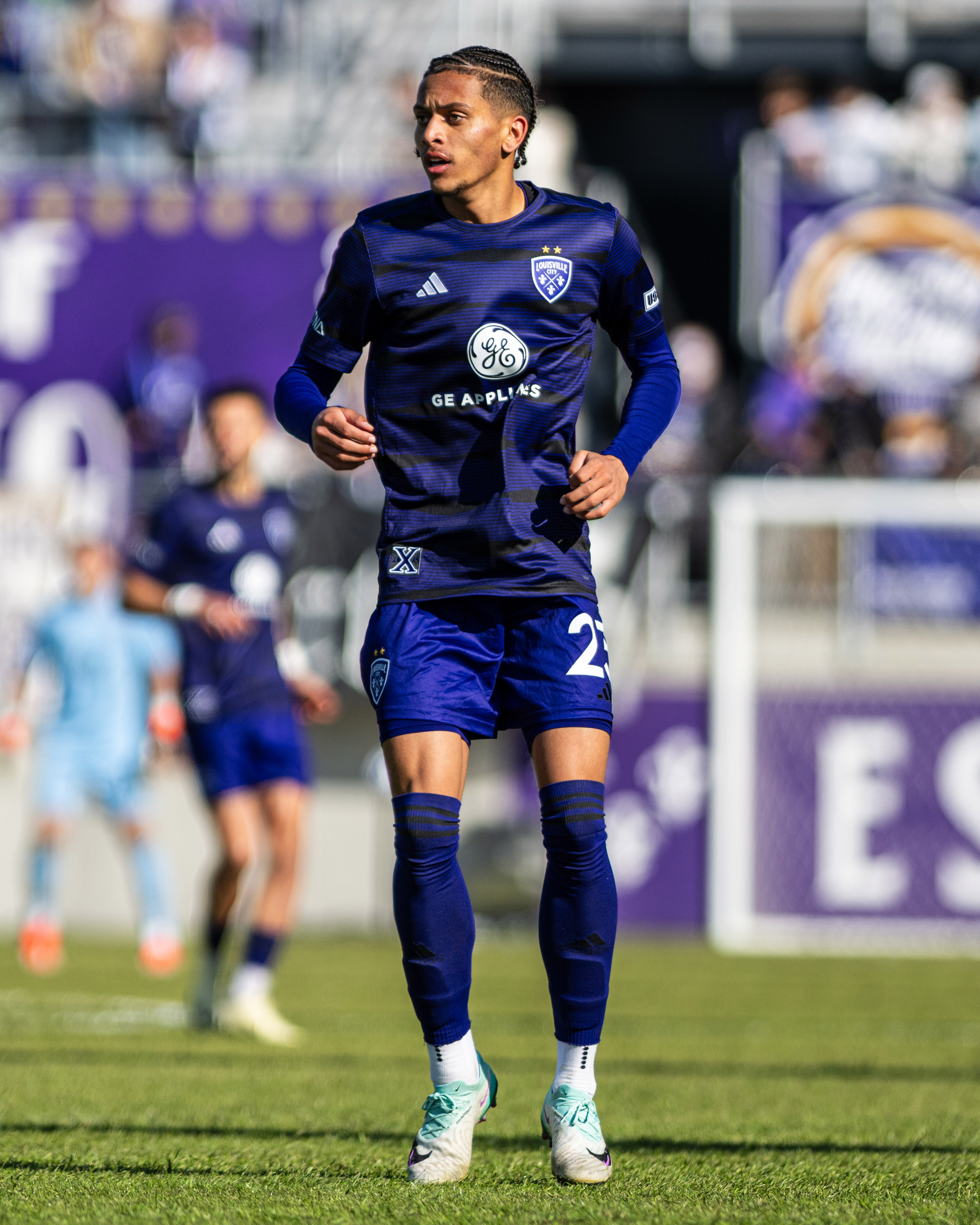
- Elijah Wynder playing for Louisville City in 2024

Personal information
- Full name: Elijah Wynder
- Date of birth: March 10, 2003 (age 23)
- Place of birth: Oldham County, Kentucky, United States
- Height: 6 ft 1 in (1.86 m)
- Position: Midfielder

Team information
- Current team: LA Galaxy
- Number: 22

Youth career
- Louisville City

Senior career*
Years	Team	Apps	(Gls)
2020–2024	Louisville City	71	(10)
2022	→ FC Tucson (loan)	12	(0)
2025–	LA Galaxy	12	(1)
2025–	Ventura County FC	1	(0)
- * Club domestic league appearances and goals as of 13:39, June 2, 2025 (UTC)

Elijah Wynder (born March 10, 2003) is an American professional soccer player who plays as a midfielder for Major League Soccer club LA Galaxy.

== Club career ==
Wynder signed a USL Academy contract with USL Championship side Louisville City on April 10, 2019. He made his professional debut though for the club on August 15, 2020, against Loudoun United. He came on as a 67th-minute substitute for Corben Bone as Louisville City won 2–0. A month after signing with the first team, Wynder suffered a season ending injury, missing the entire 2021 season.

Louisville loaned Wynder to FC Tucson on February 10, 2022, with the option to recall Wynder after June 1, 2022. On July 9, Louisville announced that they would recall Wynder from his loan after 12 appearances for Tucson.

Wynder was signed by Major League Soccer side LA Galaxy on January 26, 2025, to a three-year deal with an option for an additional year. The transfer fee was the largest received by a USL club for a domestic transfer.

Wynder made his MLS and LA Galaxy debut on February 23, 2025, coming off the bench in a 2–0 home defeat to San Diego FC.

== Personal life ==
Wynder is the older brother of Benfica B defender Joshua Wynder.

== Career statistics ==
=== Club ===
As of match played June 1, 2025

Appearances and goals by club, season and competition
Club	Season	League			Playoffs		National cup		Continental		Total	
Club	Season	Division	Apps	Goals	Apps	Goals	Apps	Goals	Apps	Goals	Apps	Goals
Louisville City	2019	USL Championship	0	0	0	0	1	0	—		1	0
Louisville City	2020	USL Championship	1	0	0	0	—		—		1	0
Louisville City	2021	USL Championship	0	0	0	0	—		—		0	0
Louisville City	Total		1	0	0	0	1	0	—		2	0
FC Tucson (loan)	2022	USL League One	12	0	—		2	0	—		14	0
FC Tucson (loan)	Total		12	0	—		2	0	—		14	0
Louisville City	2022	USL Championship	10	1	3	1	—		—		13	2
Louisville City	2023	USL Championship	28	3	2	0	2	0	—		32	3
Louisville City	2024	USL Championship	33	6	2	0	2	0	—		37	6
Louisville City	Total		71	10	7	1	4	0	—		82	11
LA Galaxy	2025	Major League Soccer	9	0	0	0	0	0	2	0	11	0
LA Galaxy	Total		9	0	0	0	0	0	2	0	11	0
Ventura County FC (loan)	2025	MLS Next Pro	1	0	0	0	0	0	—		0	0
Ventura County FC (loan)			1	0	0	0	0	0	—		1	0
Career total			94	10	7	1	7	0	2	0	110	11

== Honors ==
Individual

- USL Championship Comeback Player of the Year: 2022
- USL Championship Second Team All-League: 2024
- USL Championship Young Player of the Year: 2024
