= Chris Hubbard (soccer) =

American soccer player (born 1994)

Personal information
- Full name: Christopher Hubbard
- Date of birth: November 23, 1994 (age 31)
- Place of birth: Louisville, Kentucky, U.S.
- Height: 1.90 m (6 ft 3 in)
- Position: Goalkeeper

Youth career
- 2009–2012: Trinity Shamrocks

College career
| Years | Team | Apps | (Gls) |
| 2013–2017 | Notre Dame Fighting Irish | 63 | (0) |

Senior career*
| Years | Team | Apps | (Gls) |
| 2013 | River City Rovers | 3 | (0) |
| 2018–2021 | Louisville City | 45 | (0) |
- * Club domestic league appearances and goals as of November 5, 2021

Chris Hubbard (born November 23, 1994) is an American retired soccer player.

== Career ==
=== College and amateur ===
Hubbard played college soccer at the University of Notre Dame between 2013 and 2017. He served as backup goalkeeper during the 2013 and 2014 season, before securing the starting job in the latter three seasons.

In 2013, Hubbard also appeared for USL PDL side River City Rovers.

=== Professional ===
On January 8, 2018, Hubbard signed for United Soccer League side Louisville City.

Hubbard made his Louisville City debut on May 15, 2019, starting in a Lamar Hunt US Open Cup fixture against Reading United AC. He made his professional league debut one-month later in a 1–0 loss to New York Red Bulls II on June 16, 2019.

Following the 2021 season, Hubbard announced his retirement from playing professional soccer.
