= Danny Faundez =

American soccer player (born 1993)

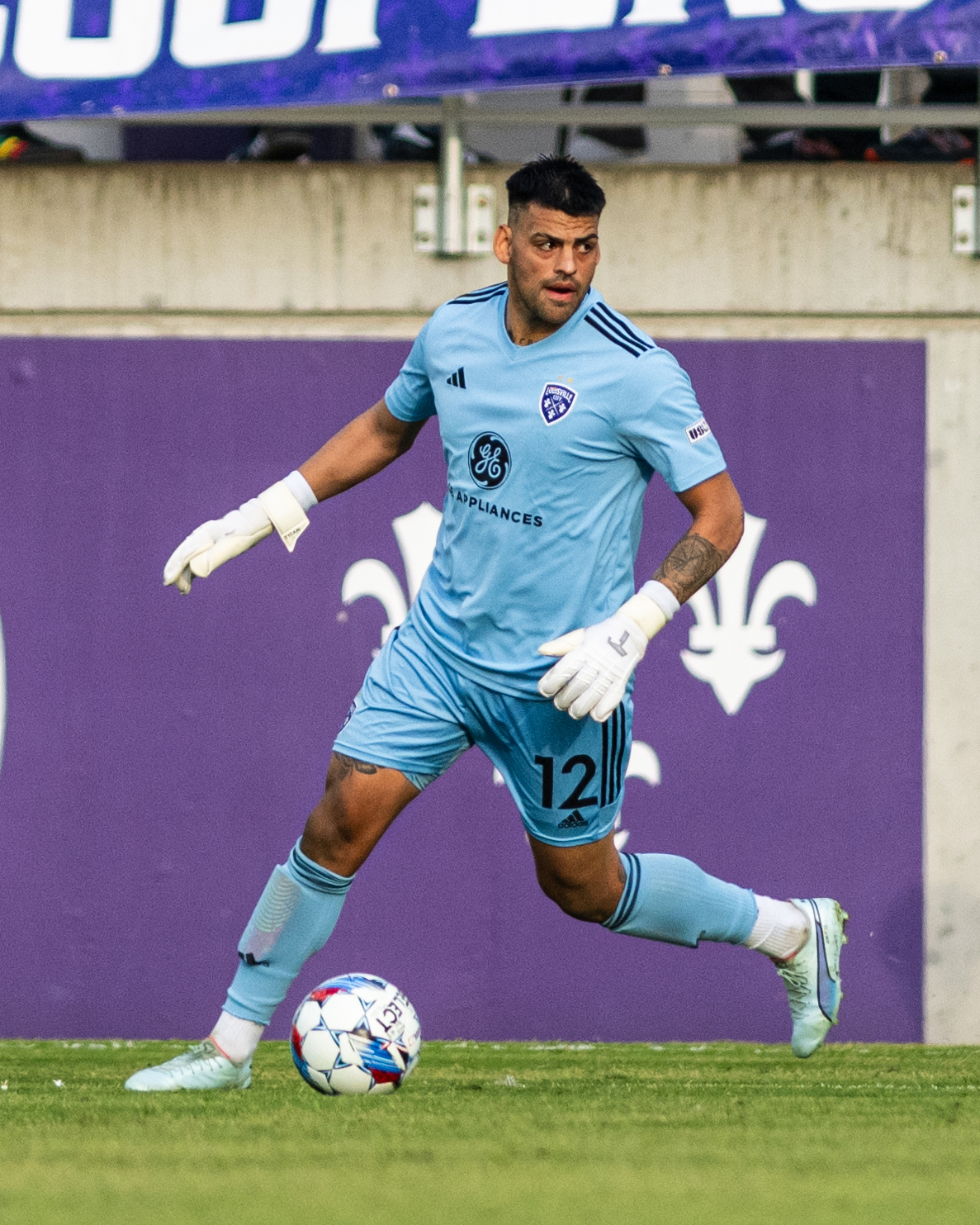
- Danny Faundez playing for Louisville City FC in 2024

Personal information
- Full name: Daniel Faundez
- Date of birth: February 2, 1993 (age 33)
- Place of birth: Seattle, Washington, United States
- Height: 6 ft 1 in (1.86 m)
- Position: Goalkeeper

Team information
- Current team: Louisville City
- Number: 12

Youth career
- –2012: Santiago Wanderers
- 2012–2014: Everton

College career
Years	Team	Apps	(Gls)
2014–2015	Bellevue Bulldogs		

Senior career*
Years	Team	Apps	(Gls)
2015	Seattle Sounders FC 2	0	(0)
2020–2021	Orange County SC	0	(0)
2022–	Louisville City	24	(0)
2022	→ Northern Colorado Hailstorm (loan)	1	(0)
- * Club domestic league appearances and goals as of November 7, 2026

Danny Faundez (born February 2, 1993) is an American professional soccer player who plays as a goalkeeper for USL Championship club Louisville City.

== Club career ==
=== Youth and college ===
Faundez played in Chile with Santiago Wanderers and then Everton's youth academy for three years, before attending Bellevue College, where he played college soccer.

=== Professional ===
On August 19, 2015, Faundez signed with United Soccer League side Seattle Sounders FC 2.

After a period out of the game, Faundez signed with USL Championship side Orange County SC in 2020. He re-signed with the club ahead of their 2021 season.

On February 22, 2022, Faundez signed with USL Championship club Louisville City after a successful trial. On April 6, 2022, Faundez was loaned to USL League One's ahead of their inaugural season. He made his professional debut the same day, starting in a Lamar Hunt U.S. Open Cup game against Colorado Springs Switchbacks.

== Personal life ==
His family is from Viña del Mar, Chile, and he holds dual American-Chilean citizenship.
