= Sean Totsch =

American soccer player (born 1991)

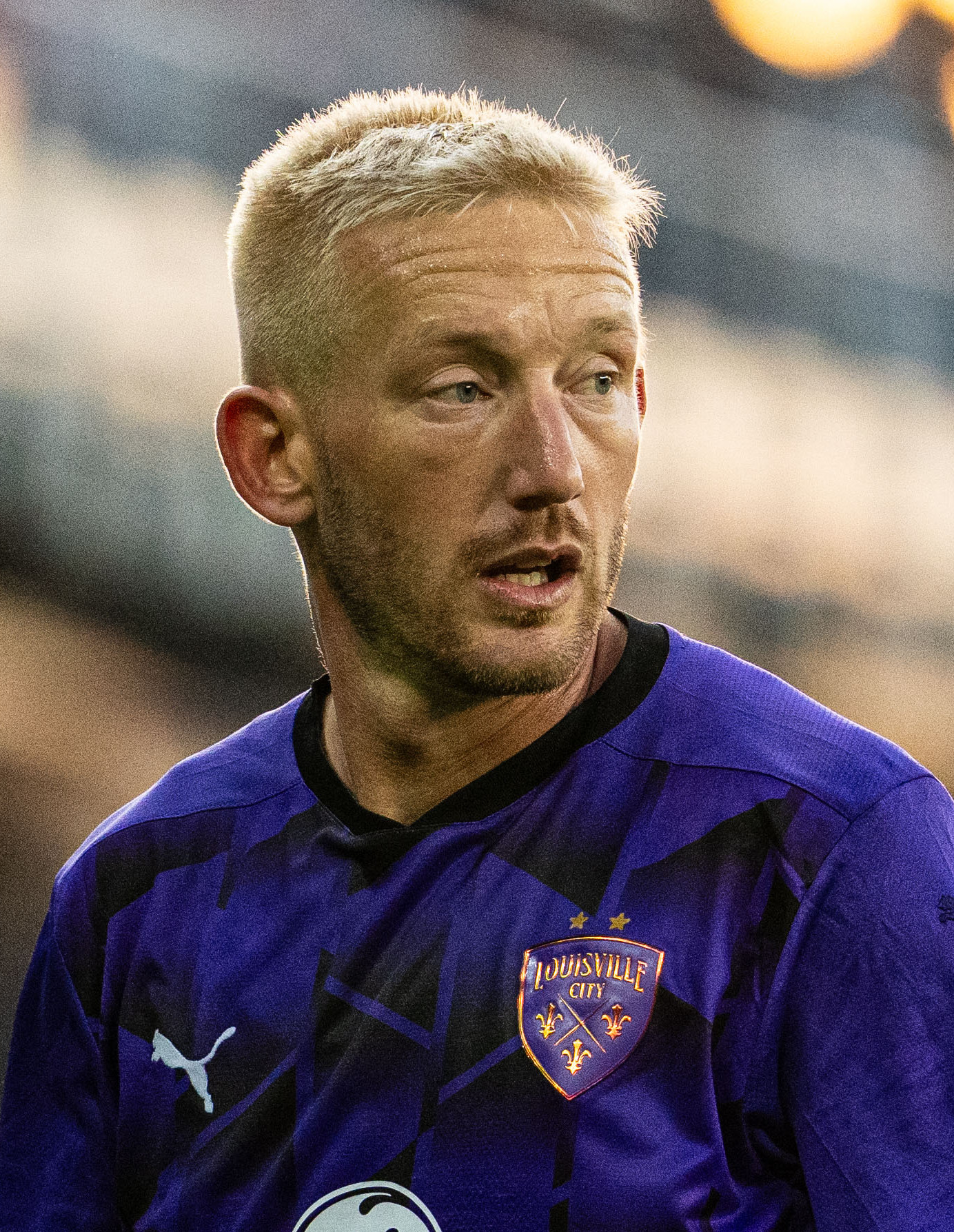
- Totsch playing for Louisville City in 2025

Personal information
- Full name: Sean William Totsch
- Date of birth: September 16, 1991 (age 35)
- Place of birth: Fargo, North Dakota, United States
- Height: 6 ft 2 in (1.88 m)
- Positions: Defender; midfielder

Team information
- Current team: Louisville City
- Number: 4

College career
Years	Team	Apps	(Gls)
2010–2013	Northern Illinois Huskies	64	(6)

Senior career*
Years	Team	Apps	(Gls)
2012–2013	Chicago Fire U-23	18	(1)
2015–2016	Rochester Rhinos	44	(1)
2017–	Louisville City	284	(29)
- * Club domestic league appearances and goals as of November 7, 2026

Sean William Totsch (/toʊtʃ/ TOHCH; born September 16, 1991) is an American soccer player currently playing for Louisville City in the USL Championship. Sean previously played indoor soccer for the Milwaukee Wave in the Major Arena Soccer League.

== Early life ==
=== Personal ===
Sean Totsch was born in Fargo, North Dakota to parents Beverly and James Totsch. He has three siblings, an older sister, Jennifer, and two younger brothers, Elliot and Ryan. He would later move to Oswego, Illinois, a suburb of Chicago, and attend high school at Oswego High School.

=== College and youth ===
Totsch graduated from high school early and played college soccer at Northern Illinois University between 2010 and 2013. During his time there he would play in 64 matches while scoring 6 goals. During his senior season he was the only NIU player to start in every match.

Totsch also appeared for USL PDL club Chicago Fire U-23 between 2012 and 2013. He would play in eighteen league matches, scoring one goal as well as playing in one U.S. Open Cup match.

== Club career ==
=== Rochester Rhinos ===
==== 2015 season ====
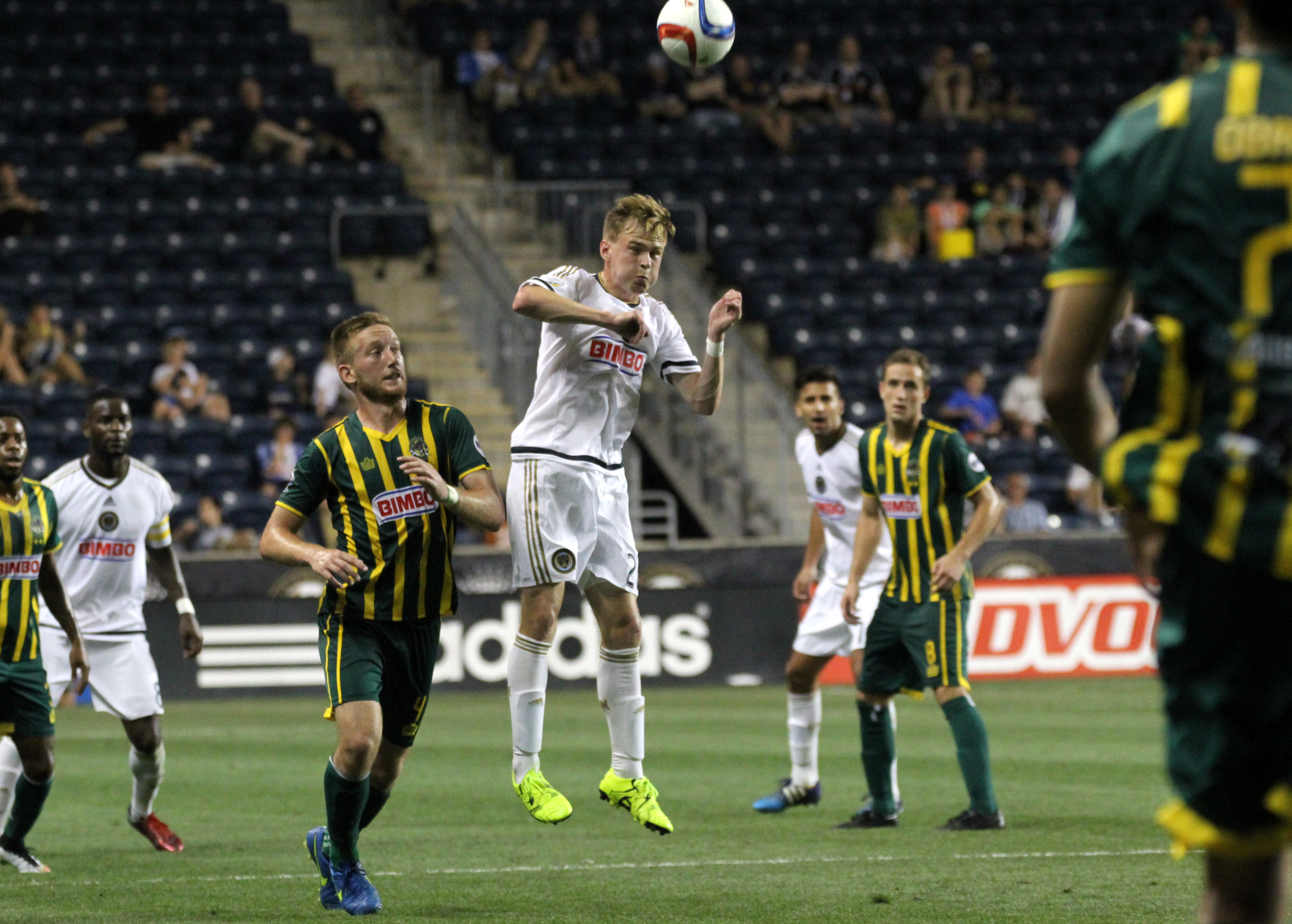
Totsch playing for Rochester Rhinos as Jimmy McLaughlin of Philadelphia Union makes a header in the 2015 U.S. Open Cup

Totsch signed with United Soccer League club Rochester Rhinos on March 13, 2015. He would appear in 22 of Rochester's 28 regular season matches as well as one match in the U.S. Open Cup. He first professional goal on September 19 in a 3–2 win against the New York Red Bulls II; his only goal of the season. He would also play in two of Rochester's three USL Cup matches helping Rochester to both the USL Regular Season and USL Cup championships.

==== 2016 season ====
Totsch would score one goal and appear in 22 of Rochester's 30 regular season matches. His lone goal came on July 29 in a 1–1 draw against Harrisburg City Islanders. He would also play one match in the U.S. Open Cup as well as both of Rochester's USL Cup matches.

=== Louisville City FC ===
==== 2017 season ====
On January 10 Totsch signed with United Soccer League club Louisville City FC and he made his debut on March 25 in Louisville's season opener against Saint Louis. He would play in 30 of Louisville's 32 regular season matches and score his lone league goal on August 23 against Harrisburg City Islanders. He'd also play in one U.S. Open Cup match while scoring one goal as well as all four of Louisville's USL Cup matches. Totsch and Louisville would go on to win the USL Cup Final against Swope Park Rangers.

==== 2018 season ====
Totsch had his contract renewed with Louisville City FC and he made his season debut on March 17 against USL expansion side Nashville SC. He went on to appear in 27 of Louisville's 34 league matches without scoring a goal. He also appeared in all five of Louisville's U.S. Open Cup matches as Louisville reached the quarter-finals of the competition for the first time in its history. This included a 3–2 victory over the New England Revolution of MLS; Louisville's first victory over an MLS side. His only goal of the year came in the third round of the Open Cup against Saint Louis which would be his lone goal of the match. Totsch also appeared as a substitute in all four of Louisville's USL Cup playoff matches as he and Louisville went on to win the USL Cup Final against Phoenix.

== Honors ==
=== Club ===
Rochester Rhinos

- USL (Regular Season) (1): 2015
- USL Cup (1): 2015

Louisville City FC

- USL Cup (2): 2017, 2018

=== Individual ===
- USL Championship All League First Team (3): 2020, 2021, 2022
- USL Championship All League Second Team: 2023, 2024
