= Parker Siegfried =

American soccer player

Personal information
- Date of birth: February 17, 1997 (age 29)
- Place of birth: Granville, Ohio, United States
- Height: 6 ft 1 in (1.85 m)
- Position: Goalkeeper

Youth career
- 2011–2015: Columbus Crew

College career
| Years | Team | Apps | (Gls) |
| 2015–2019 | Ohio State Buckeyes | 72 | (0) |

Senior career*
| Years | Team | Apps | (Gls) |
| 2017–2018 | Asheville City | 21 | (0) |
| 2020 | South Georgia Tormenta | 0 | (0) |
| 2020 | Detroit City | 2 | (0) |
| 2021–2022 | Louisville City | 10 | (0) |
| 2021 | → Sporting Kansas City (loan) | 0 | (0) |
- * Club domestic league appearances and goals as of October 18, 2022

Parker Siegfried (born February 17, 1997) is a retired American professional soccer player who played as a goalkeeper.

== Career ==
=== Youth, college & amateur ===
Siegfried played with the Columbus Crew academy prior to playing college soccer at Ohio State University in 2015. He redshirted in 2015, before going on to make 72 appearances for the team and achieving 18 shutouts. During his time with the Buckeyes, Siegfried was named Big Ten All-Freshman Team in 2016, was a two-time Academic All-Big Ten in 2016 and 2017, and a Four-time OSU Scholar-Athlete.

In 2017 and 2018, Siegfried played with NPSL side Asheville City. He went on to make 21 regular season appearances for the club.

=== Professional ===
==== MLS SuperDraft ====
On January 13, 2020, Siegfried was selected 74th overall in the 2020 MLS SuperDraft by New York City FC. However, he did not sign the club.

==== South Georgia Tormenta ====
On April 8, 2020, Siegfried signed with USL League One side South Georgia Tormenta. He was released by Tormenta on September 8, 2020, without having made a first team appearance for the club.

==== Detroit City ====
Immediately following his release, it was announced that Siegfried had joined Detroit City for their first full season in the National Independent Soccer Association. He went on to help the club win the NISA Fall Championship.

==== Louisville City ====
On March 17, 2021, Siegfried signed with USL Championship side Louisville City FC following a success trial with the club.

On April 15, 2021, Major League Soccer side Sporting Kansas City brought in Siegfried on a season-long loan following an injury crisis among their goalkeepers. Kansas City acquired his Major League Soccer rights from New York City FC in exchange for a 3rd round 2023 MLS SuperDraft pick. However, he returned to Louisville in late May.

Following the 2022 season, Siegfried retired from playing soccer to pursue other career opportunities outside the sport.
