= Enoch Mushagalusa =

Congolese footballer

Personal information
- Date of birth: November 13, 1999 (age 26)
- Place of birth: Kinshasa, DR Congo
- Height: 5 ft 11 in (1.80 m)
- Position: Forward

Team information
- Current team: Valletta
- Number: 2

Youth career
- 2012–2018: Colorado Rapids

College career
Years	Team	Apps	(Gls)
2018	Salt Lake Bruins	17	(27)

Senior career*
Years	Team	Apps	(Gls)
2017–2018	Colorado Rapids U-23	4	(0)
2020–2021	Sporting Kansas City II	43	(9)
2022–2023	Louisville City	64	(14)
2023	→ San Diego Loyal (loan)	4	(0)
2024	Hartford Athletic	7	(1)
2024	→ Pittsburgh Riverhounds (loan)	4	(0)
2024–	Valletta	19	(6)
- * Club domestic league appearances and goals as of 3 May 2025

Enoch Mushagalusa (born November 13, 1999) is a Congolese professional footballer who currently plays for Maltese Challenge League club Valletta.

== Career ==
=== College and amateur ===
After playing with the Colorado Rapids academy from the under-15's, Mushagalusa went on to play one year of college soccer at Salt Lake Community College in 2018, where he scored 27 goals in 17 appearances. He had previously committed to play at Fort Lewis College.

In 2017 and 2018, Mushagalusa played in the USL PDL with Colorado Rapids U23 and tallied a total of 53 goals in 85 U.S. Soccer Development Academy appearances with the Rapids Academy.

=== Professional ===
Mushagalusa was set to continue playing college soccer at the University of South Carolina in 2020, but instead opted to opted to sign a professional contract with USL Championship side Sporting Kansas City II on February 26, 2020. He made his professional debut on March 8, 2020, appearing as a 60th-minute substitute in a 1–2 loss to Charlotte Independence.

On 18 January 2022, Mushagalusa signed with Louisville City. On 12 July 2022, Mushagalusa was named USL Championship Player of the Week for Week 18 of the 2022 season, after scoring his first career hat trick in a 6–0 victory over New York Red Bulls II.

In July 2023, Louisville City loaned Mushagalusa to San Diego Loyal in a transaction that saw Kyle Adams join Louisville on a full-time basis. Louisville City recalled Mushagalusa from the loan ahead of the September 22 roster freeze, making him eligible for the 2023 playoffs.

On December 20, 2023, Mushagalusa signed for Hartford Athletic. On June 18, 2024, he joined USL Championship side Pittsburgh Riverhounds on loan for the remainder of the season. However, after only playing 4 matches for the club, Mushagalusa was recalled from loan by Hartford and joined Valletta in Malta on a permanent deal. He made his debut in the 3–0 win against Sirens FC. He scored his first goal for the Maltese club in a 6–0 win over Lija Athletic.
