= Jorge Gonzalez (footballer, born 1998) =

Spanish footballer

Jorge González
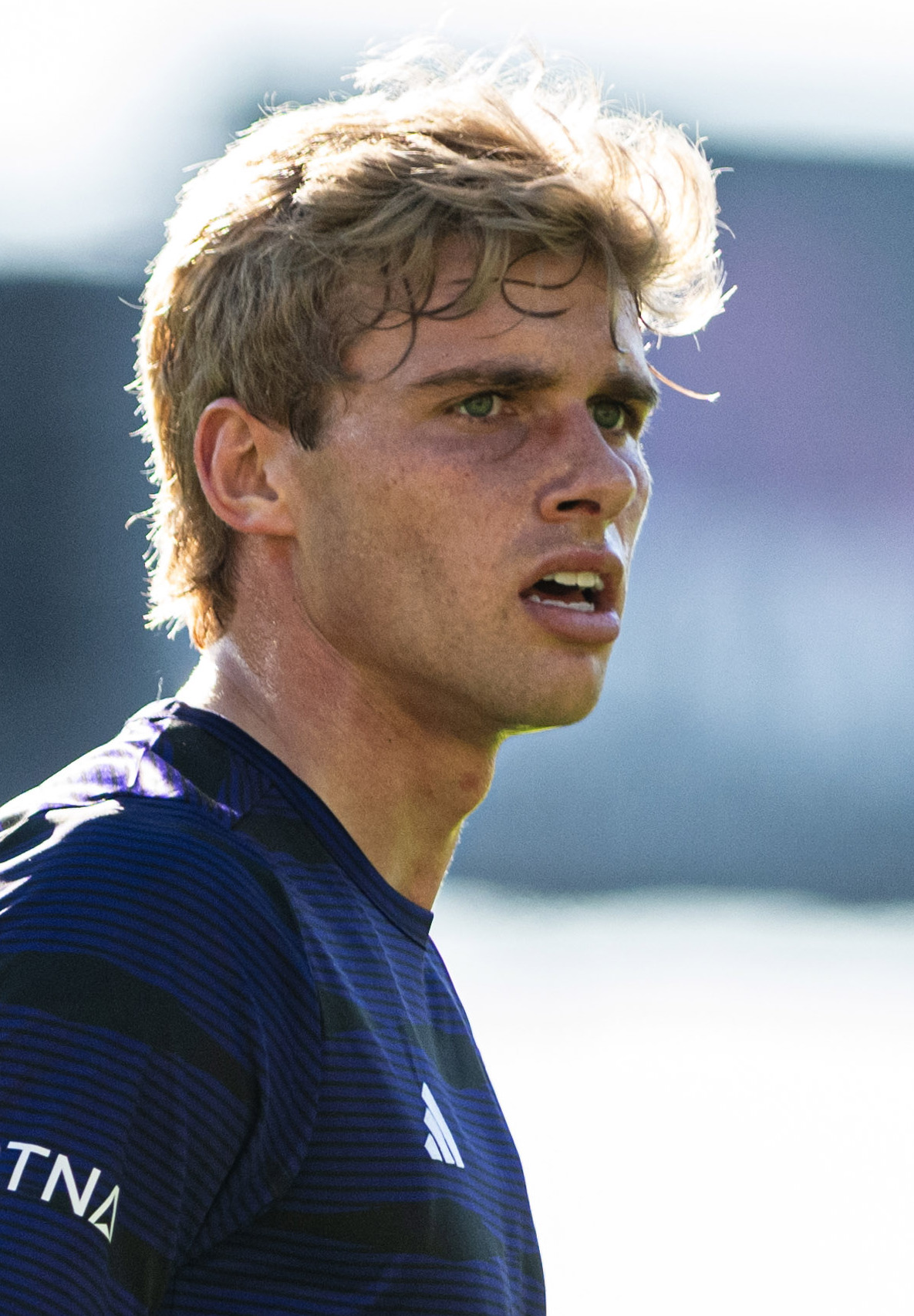
- González with Louisville City in 2024

Personal information
- Full name: Jorge González Asensi
- Date of birth: October 29, 1998 (age 28)
- Place of birth: Valencia, Spain
- Height: 5 ft 11 in (1.80 m)
- Position: Attacking midfielder

College career
Years	Team	Apps	(Gls)
2016	Mercyhurst Lakers	18	(14)
2017–2019	SIU Edwardsville Cougars	50	(18)

Senior career*
Years	Team	Apps	(Gls)
2019	Chicago FC United	4	(2)
2020	Portland Timbers 2	10	(8)
2021	Portland Timbers	0	(0)
2021	→ Louisville City (loan)	18	(3)
2022–2024	Louisville City	58	(8)
- * Club domestic league appearances and goals as of 7 November 2024

Jorge González Asensi (born 29 October 1998) is a former Spanish footballer who currently played as a midfielder.

== Career ==
=== Mercyhurst University ===
In 2016, González attended Mercyhurst University in Erie, Pennsylvania to play college soccer. In his freshman year he made 18 appearances, scoring 14 goals and tallying four assists, and was also named PSAC Freshman of the Year.

=== Southern Illinois University Edwardsville ===
González transferred to Southern Illinois University Edwardsville for his sophomore year in 2017, where he played for three seasons, making 50 appearances and totaling 18 goals and five assists. While with the Cougars, González was chosen as a first team All-North Region by United Soccer Coaches after earning Mid-American Conference Player of the Year honors.

=== Chicago FC United ===
While at college, González also appeared for USL League Two side Chicago FC United in 2019.

=== MLS SuperDraft ===
On 13 January 2020, González was selected 76th overall in the 2020 MLS SuperDraft by Los Angeles FC. However, he was not signed by the club.

=== Portland Timbers 2 ===
On 5 March 2020, González signed with USL Championship side Portland Timbers 2. He made his professional debut on 3 August 2020, starting in a 4–0 loss to rivals Tacoma Defiance. Timbers 2 opted to stop operating following the 2020 season.

=== Portland Timbers ===
On 2 April 2021, González was signed by the Portland Timbers to a one-year contract with a club option for an additional year and loaned to Louisville City FC for the 2021 season. Following the 2021 season, Portland opted to decline their contract option on Gonzalez.

=== Louisville City FC ===
After spending the 2021 season on loan with Louisville City FC, Gonzalez signed a permanent contract with LouCity in January 2022.
