= Brian Ownby =

American soccer player (born 1990)

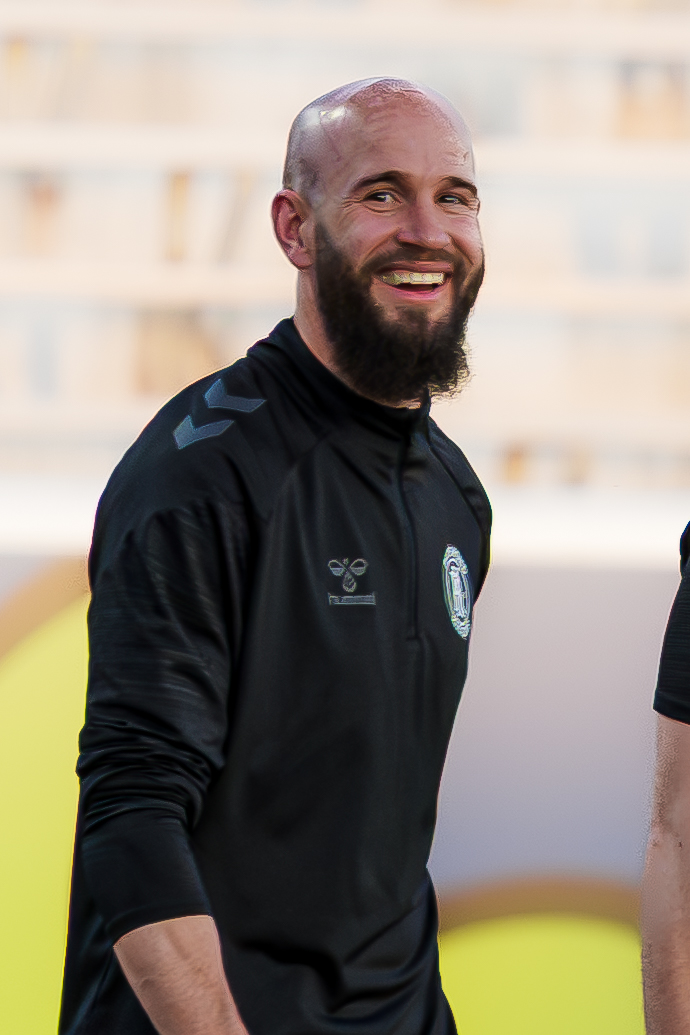
- Ownby in 2026

Personal information
- Full name: Brian Tyler Ownby
- Date of birth: July 16, 1990 (age 36)
- Place of birth: Glen Allen, Virginia, United States
- Height: 5 ft 11 in (1.80 m)
- Positions: Forward; winger

Team information
- Current team: Richmond Kickers (head coach)

Youth career
- Richmond Strikers

College career
Years	Team	Apps	(Gls)
2008–2011	Virginia Cavaliers		

Senior career*
Years	Team	Apps	(Gls)
2011	Reading United	4	(4)
2012–2014	Houston Dynamo	29	(0)
2013	→ Richmond Kickers (loan)	19	(7)
2014	→ Pittsburgh Riverhounds SC (loan)	5	(1)
2015–2016	Richmond Kickers	39	(7)
2017–2025	Louisville City	179	(24)
Total		275	(43)

International career
2009	United States U20	10	(1)

Managerial career
- 2026–: Richmond Kickers
Medal record
Representing United States
Runner-up	CONCACAF U-20 Championship	2009
- * Club domestic league appearances and goals as of October 25, 2025

Brian Tyler Ownby (born July 16, 1990) is an American professional coach and former professional soccer player. He is currently head coach of the Richmond Kickers.

== Early life ==
=== Personal ===
Ownby was born in Glen Allen, Virginia to parents Steve and Andrea Ownby and has a younger brother named Eric. He first played competitive soccer with the academy and Travel teams of the Richmond Strikers. He attended Deep Run High School where he played soccer and became the school's all-time leading goal scorer. As a Senior in 2008 Ownby led Deep Run to a 22-2-1 record and the Virginia Group AAA state championship. In the Championship match he earned an assist on the lone goal of the match as Deep Run defeated Robinson Secondary School 1–0. After the season he was named Virginia's Soccer Player of the Year and to the All-State First Team.

=== College and Youth ===
Ownby played four years of college soccer at the University of Virginia between 2008 and 2011. During his Freshman year he scored five goals and added four assists over 19 matches and was named to the ACC All-Freshman and All-Tournament teams. He was also named to the Soccer America All-Freshman and to the NSCAA All-South Atlantic Region second teams. He was limited by injury during his Sophomore year and played in fifteen matches scoring three goals and one assist. Ownby and Virginia went on to win the 2009 NCAA Division I Men's Soccer Championship with Ownby being named to the all tournament team. He scored the golden goal against the Wake Forest Demon Deacons in the NCAA semifinal. As a Junior he appeared in 20 matches scoring seven goals with three assists earning first team All-ACC honors. As a Senior he appeared in 18 matches scoring six goals with two assists earning second team All-ACC honors.

After college, Ownby played one season with Reading United AC of the Premier Development League. He scored four goals in four matches with Reading.

== Club career ==
=== Houston Dynamo ===
==== 2012 season ====
Ownby was selected by the Houston Dynamo with the 7th pick in the first round of the 2012 MLS Supplemental Draft and signed his first professional contract after a month long trial. He made his professional debut on May 29 in the US Open Cup against San Antonio. He made seven league appearances for Houston as well as one appearance in the US Open Cup. Houston would go on to win the Western Conference playoffs although Ownby didn't participate in any of their MLS Cup matches.

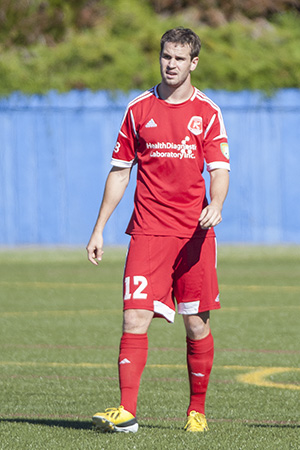
Ownby with the Richmond Kickers in 2013

==== 2013 season ====
===== Loan to Richmond Kickers =====
On March 22, 2013, Ownby was sent to the USL Pro side Richmond Kickers on loan from the Dynamo until September 2013. He appeared in nineteen of Richmond's league matches scoring seven goals with six assists as well as both of their USL Cup matches. Richmond and Ownby finished the USL Pro regular season with the best overall record; winning the Commissioner's Cup.

===== Return to Houston =====
After his loan to Richmond, Ownby appeared in three league matches for Houston. He also made his first appearance in a continental club competition when he was used as a substitute in the CONCACAF Champions League against W Connection F.C. on August 20.

==== 2014 season ====
Due to injuries to other players, Ownby began the 2014 season as part of Houston's senior roster and made his season debut March 15 against Montreal. He played in 21 league matches for Houston and made two appearances in the US Open cup.

===== Loan to Pittsburgh Riverhounds =====
Ownby went on several loan periods with Houston's USL affiliate, Pittsburgh. With Pittsburgh, Ownby made five appearances, scoring one goal. He was released by Houston in November 2014.

=== Richmond Kickers ===
==== 2015 season ====
Ownby signed with the Richmond Kickers of the United Soccer League on February 9, 2015 and he made his season debut on April 10 against Wilmington; a match where he scored a goal. He made appearances in twelve of Richmond's 28 league matches, with four goals and one assist, as well as playing and scoring one goal in one of Richmond's US Open Cup matches. Ownby's season was cut short when he sustained a serious injury to his right shoulder in a June 14 match against Montreal. He had season ending surgery eleven days later.

==== 2016 season ====
After an unsuccessful trial with the Colorado Rapids of MLS, Ownby re-signed with Richmond for the 2016 Season. He made his season debut March 25 in a 3–1 victory against Harrisburg and went on to appear in 26 of Richmond's 30 league matches scoring three goals. Of the four league matches in which he did not participate, two were due to a concussion that he sustained on August 21 against Orlando City B. He also played one match each for Richmond in the US Open Cup and the USL Cup Playoffs without scoring a goal.

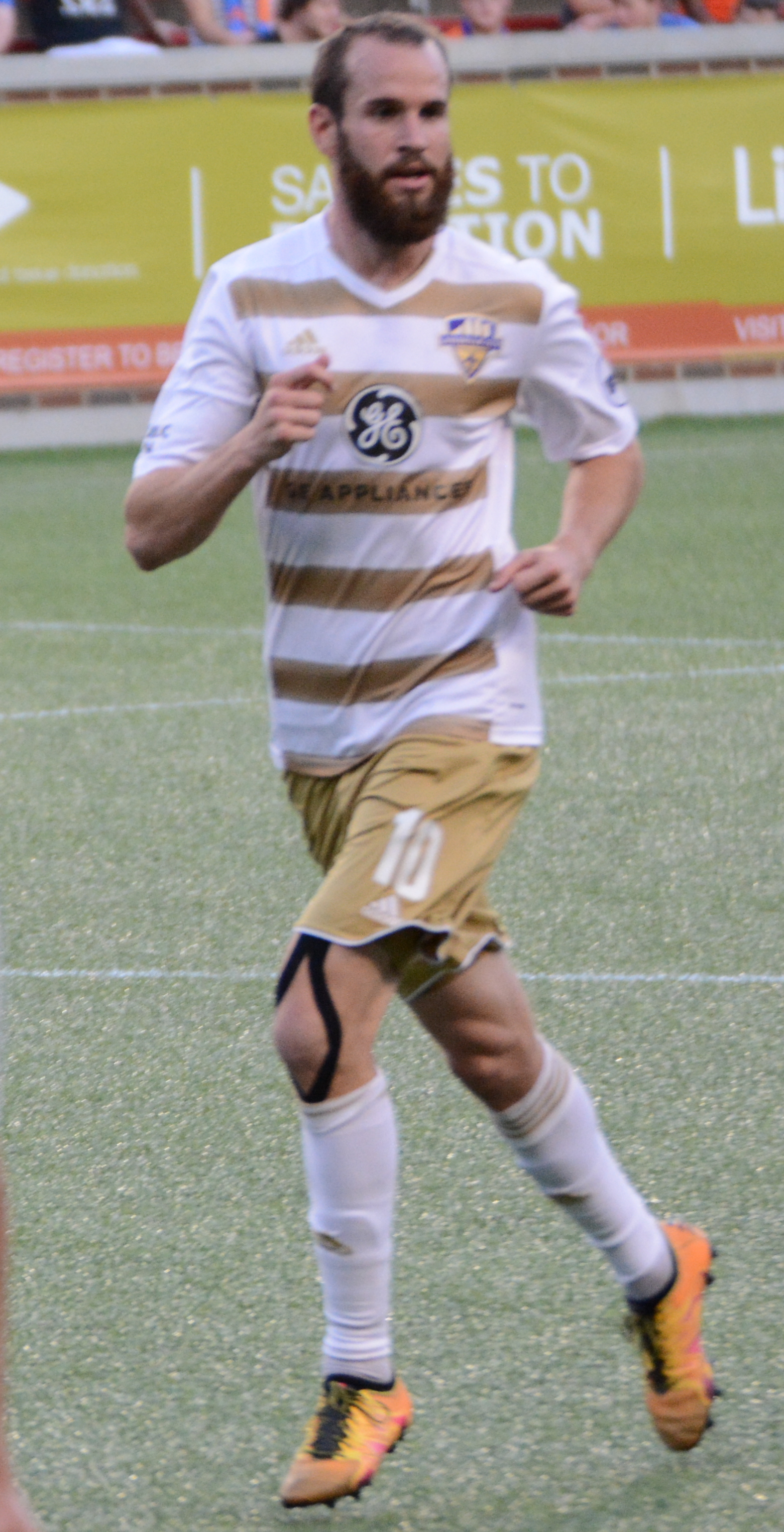
Ownby with Louisville City in 2017

=== Louisville City ===
==== 2017 season ====
Ownby signed with USL side Louisville City FC on January 18, 2017 and made his season debut March 25 against Saint Louis. He made an appearance in 23 of Louisville's 32 league matches, scoring four goals with four assists. He also appeared in one of Louisville's two US Open Cup matches, going goalless. In the USL Cup Playoffs, he made an appearance in all four of Louisville's matches. Ownby, along with Stefano Bonomo of New York Red Bulls II, was the top goal scorer of the playoffs with three team leading goals. Ownby and Louisville went on to win the USL Cup Final against Swope Park.

==== 2018 season ====
Ownby remained with Louisville City FC for the 2018 season. He missed the first three matches of the season due to illness and made his season debut on April 14 against Richmond. He made appearances in 22 of Louisville's 34 league matches, missing several more matches due to a concussion, and failed to score a goal during league play. He also appeared in all five of Louisville's U.S. Open Cup matches, as Louisville reached the quarter-finals of the competition for the first time in its history. This included a 3–2 victory over the New England Revolution of MLS; Louisville's first victory over an MLS side. He, along with Cameron Lancaster, led the team with two goals scored in the competition, including the decisive goal against New England. Ownby also appeared in all four of Louisville's USL Cup playoff matches, as he and Louisville went on to win the USL Cup Final against Phoenix. For the second consecutive season he was the top goal scorer of the playoffs, along with Didier Drogba and Michael Seaton, with three goals each. This led the team.

== Coaching career ==
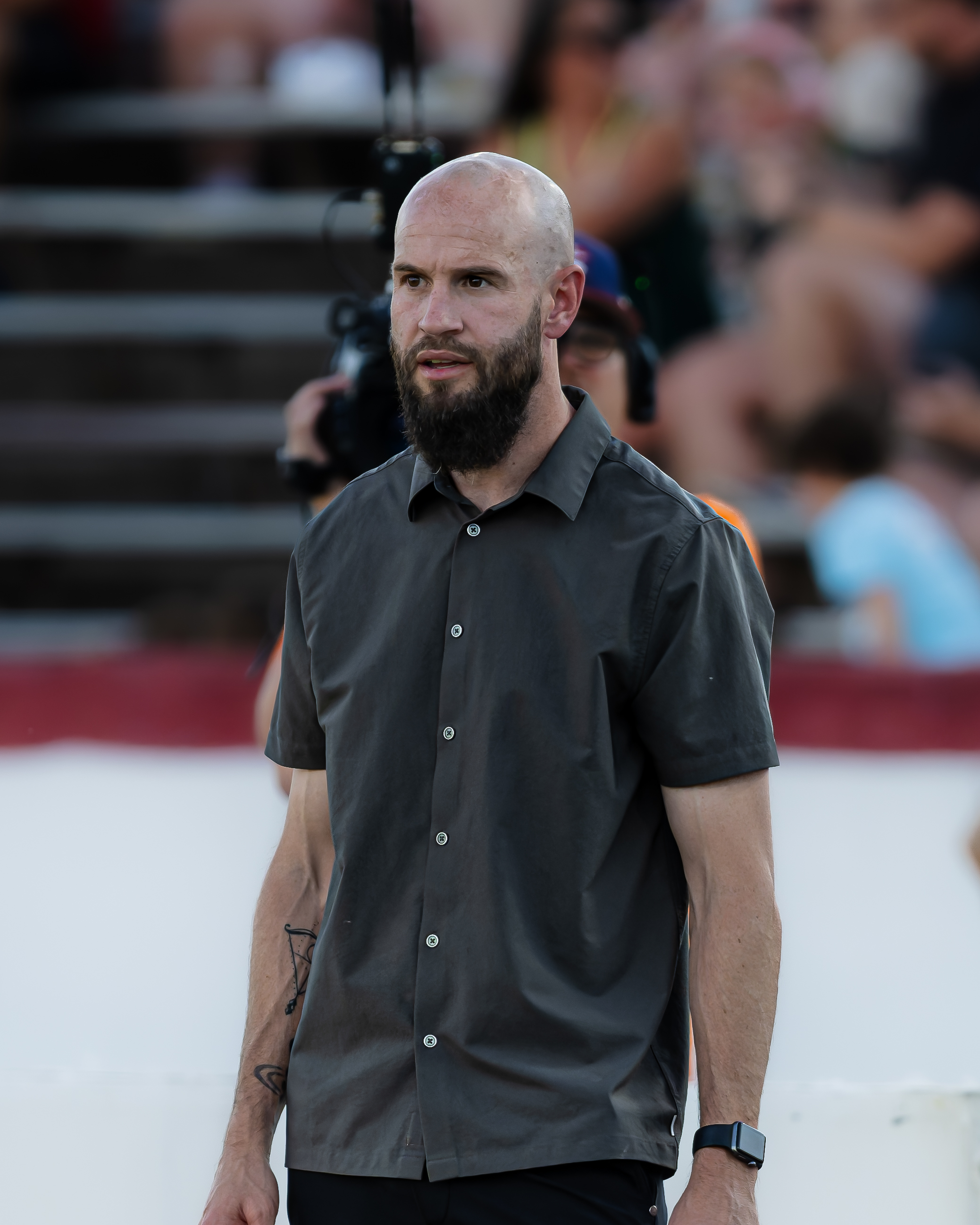
Ownby as head coach of the Richmond Kickers in 2026

On 12 January 2026, return to the Richmond Kickers as assistant coach.

On 15 June, after the club parted ways with outgoing manager Darren Sawatzky, he officially became the interim manager of the Kickers. His first game as interim manager came in a 2–0 loss against USL League One expansion club, Fort Wayne FC. His team were also crushed in a 5–1 loss against Portland Hearts of Pine.

On 28 October 2026, Ownby was offically named head coach of the Richmond Kickers.

== International ==
Ownby served as alternate for United States U-17 national team thirty-man roster for 2007 FIFA U-17 World Cup. He was a member of the U-18 national team that competed in Lisbon, and the U-20 national team at FIFA U-20 World Cup and scored a goal in a group stage match against Cameroon.

== Honors ==
=== Club ===
Houston Dynamo

- Major League Soccer Eastern Conference Championship (1): 2012

Richmond Kickers

- USL (Regular Season) (1): 2013

Louisville City FC

- USL Cup (2): 2017, 2018
