= Napo Matsoso =

Mosotho footballer (born 1994)

Personal information
- Full name: Napo Davis Matsoso
- Date of birth: 27 May 1994 (age 32)
- Place of birth: Maseru, Lesotho
- Height: 5 ft 6 in (1.68 m)
- Position: Midfielder

Youth career
- Rovers Youth Academy

College career
Years	Team	Apps	(Gls)
2013–2016	Kentucky Wildcats	72	(18)

Senior career*
Years	Team	Apps	(Gls)
2014	Derby City Rovers	7	(0)
2016	Reading United AC		
2018	Mississippi Brilla	10	(4)
2018–2022	Louisville City	89	(11)
2023–2024	Oakland Roots	51	(1)

International career^{‡}
2017–	Lesotho	2	(0)
- * Club domestic league appearances and goals as of 13:06, 31 October 2024 (UTC) ‡ National team caps and goals as of 19:32, 17 January 2018 (UTC)

Napo Davis Matsoso is a Mosotho footballer who plays as a midfielder for the Lesotho national team.

Matsoso was drafted 31st overall by the New England Revolution in the second round of the 2017 MLS SuperDraft.

== Honors ==
Louisville City

- USL Cup: 2018
