= Wesley Charpie =

American soccer player

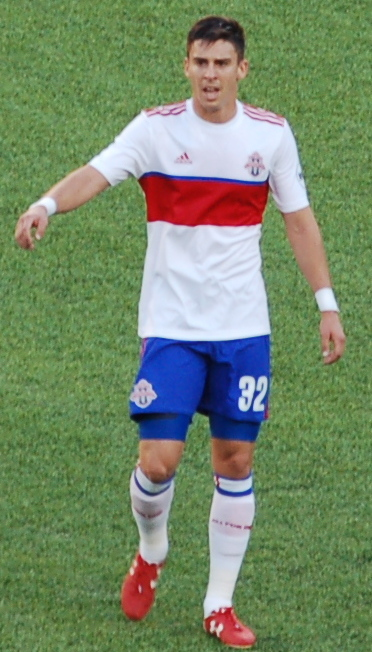
- Charpie playing for Toronto FC II in 2016

Personal information
- Full name: Wesley Andrew Charpie
- Date of birth: November 4, 1992 (age 33)
- Place of birth: Tarpon Springs, Florida, United States
- Height: 1.83 m (6 ft 0 in)
- Position: Defender

Team information
- Current team: Real Monarchs
- Number: 67

Youth career
- 2009–2011: Clearwater Chargers

College career
Years	Team	Apps	(Gls)
2011–2014	South Florida Bulls	81	(5)

Senior career*
Years	Team	Apps	(Gls)
2013–2014	Reading United	16	(2)
2015–2016	Toronto FC II	43	(0)
2017	Saint Louis FC	19	(0)
2018	Jacksonville Armada	10	(2)
2019	Memphis 901	28	(0)
2020–2024	Louisville City	115	(5)
2025–	Real Monarchs	15	(1)
- * Club domestic league appearances and goals as of January 15, 2025

Wesley Andrew Charpie (born November 4, 1992) is an American professional soccer player who currently plays for MLS Next Pro club Real Monarchs.

== Career ==
=== College and amateur ===
Charpie spent his entire college career at the University of South Florida. He made a total of 81 appearances for the Bulls and tallied five goals and 21 assists.

Charpie also played in the Premier Development League for Reading United.

=== Professional ===
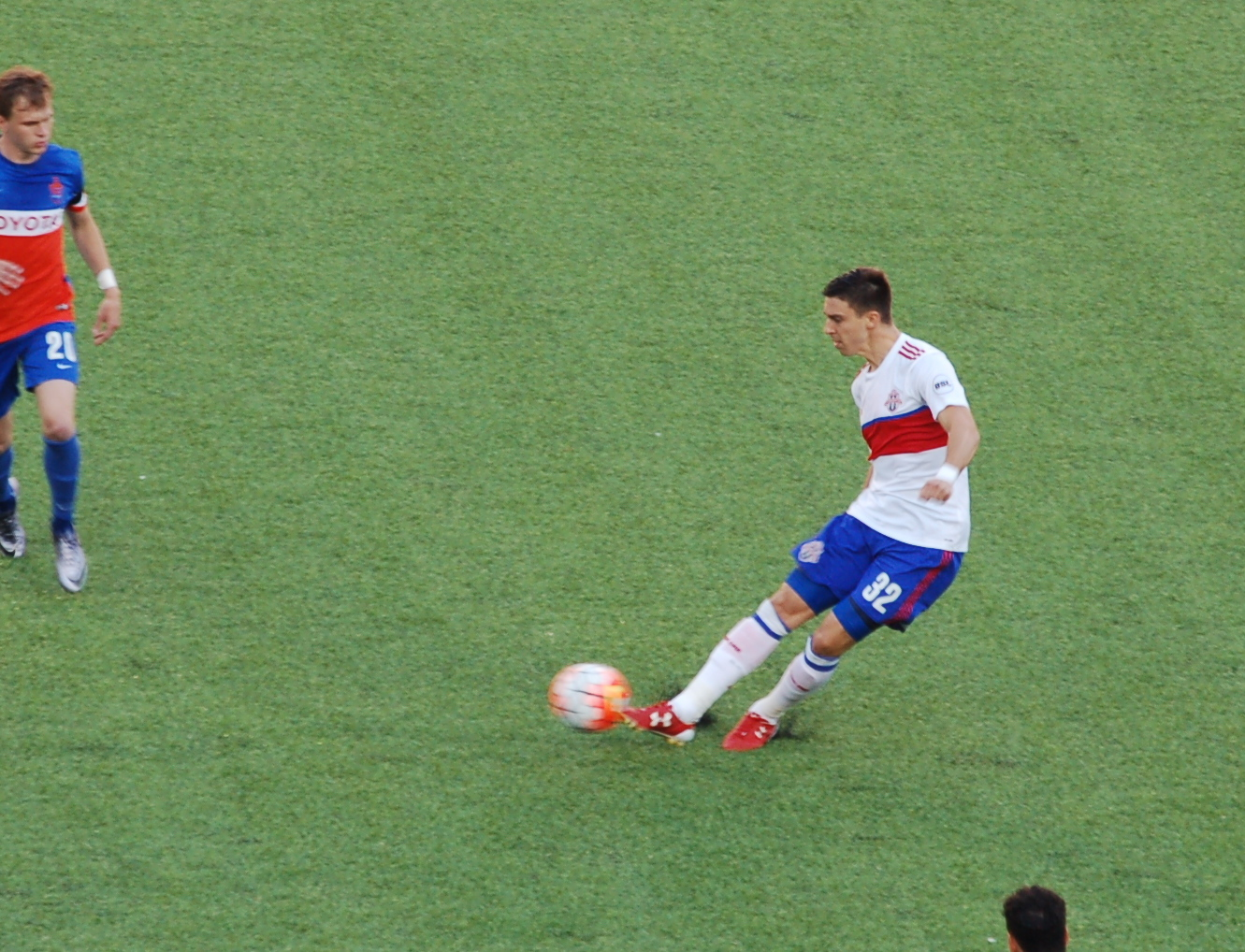
Wesley Charpie with Toronto FC II in 2016

On January 15, 2015, Charpie was selected in the second round (29th overall) of the 2015 MLS SuperDraft by Toronto FC. However, he ended up signing with USL affiliate club Toronto FC II. On March 21, he made his professional debut in a 3–2 defeat to Charleston Battery.

On November 22, 2016, Saint Louis FC has agreed to a contract with midfielder Octavio Guzmán, defender Wesley Charpie, and midfielder Mats Bjurman, pending United Soccer League and United States Soccer Federation approval.

In January 2025, Charpie left Louisville City in order to move closer to his girlfriend, Utah Royals player Kaleigh Riehl.
