= Paolo DelPiccolo =

American soccer player

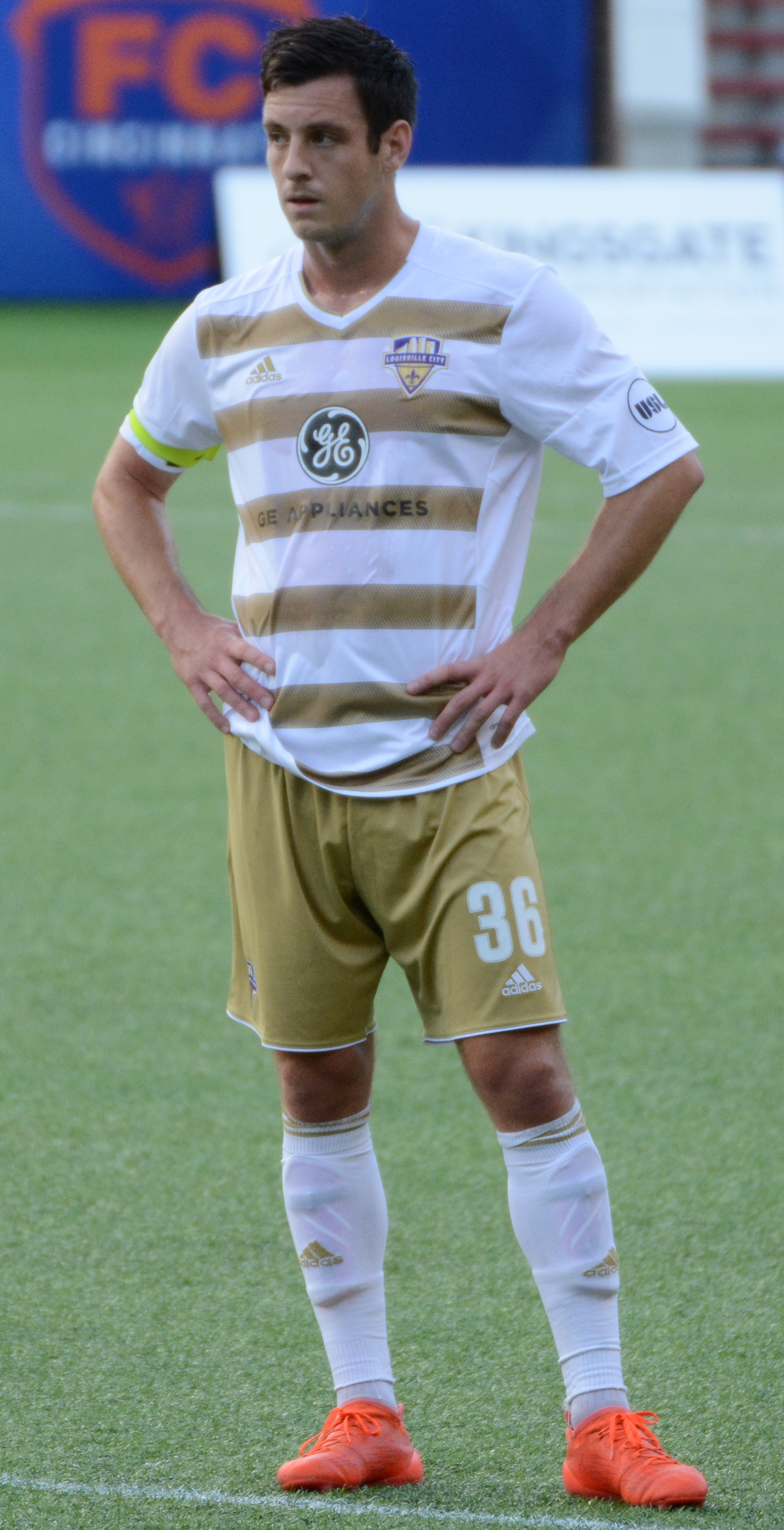
- DelPiccolo playing for Louisville City in 2017

Personal information
- Full name: Paolo DelPiccolo
- Date of birth: 28 May 1991 (age 35)
- Place of birth: Wheat Ridge, Colorado, United States
- Height: 1.84 m (6 ft 0 in)
- Position: Midfielder

College career
Years	Team	Apps	(Gls)
2009–2012	Louisville Cardinals	88	(5)

Senior career*
Years	Team	Apps	(Gls)
2013	Eintracht Frankfurt II	7	(1)
2013	Montreal Impact	0	(0)
2014	New England Revolution	0	(0)
2014	Arizona United	27	(2)
2015	Charlotte Independence	26	(0)
2016–2023	Louisville City	203	(23)

Managerial career
- 2018: Louisville City (joint interim)
- 2024–: Louisville City (assistant)
- * Club domestic league appearances and goals as of October 18, 2023

Paolo DelPiccolo (born May 28, 1991) is an American retired soccer player who is currently an assistant coach for Louisville City in the USL Championship.

== Career ==
=== College and amateur ===
DelPiccolo played four years of college soccer at the University of Louisville between 2009 and 2012.

=== Professional career ===
DelPiccolo was drafted 27th overall by Montreal Impact in the 2013 MLS SuperDraft. However, he opted to move abroad and signed with Eintracht Frankfurt in January 2013.

DelPiccolo was released by Frankfurt at the end of their 2012–13 season and signed with Montreal Impact on July 5, 2013. He was waived at the end of the season by Montreal without making a first team appearance and was subsequently signed by New England Revolution in the MLS Waiver Draft on November 25, 2013. However, DelPiccolo was waived by New England just before the start of the 2014 MLS season on March 10, 2014.

On April 10, 2014, DelPiccolo signed with USL Pro club Arizona United. On January 22, 2015, DelPiccolo signed with the Charlotte Independence.

DelPiccolo signed with USL's Louisville City FC on February 2, 2016. On March 22, 2022, DelPiccolo became just the 12th player in USL Championship history to reach 200 regular season appearances during a 1–1 draw against Indy Eleven.

After eight seasons with Louisville, DelPiccolo retired as the club's all-time appearances leader on January 22, 2024. He moved into coaching roles, as an assistant for the USL Championship first team, and also with the club's academy.

== Honors ==
=== Club ===
Louisville City FC

- USL Cup (2): 2017, 2018

=== Individual ===
- USL Cup Final MVP: 2017

== Personal life ==
As of March 2020, DelPiccolo is in a relationship with Katie George, a former University of Louisville volleyball player and Miss Kentucky USA and journalist with the ACC Network.
