= 2018 Louisville City FC season =

Louisville City
2018 season
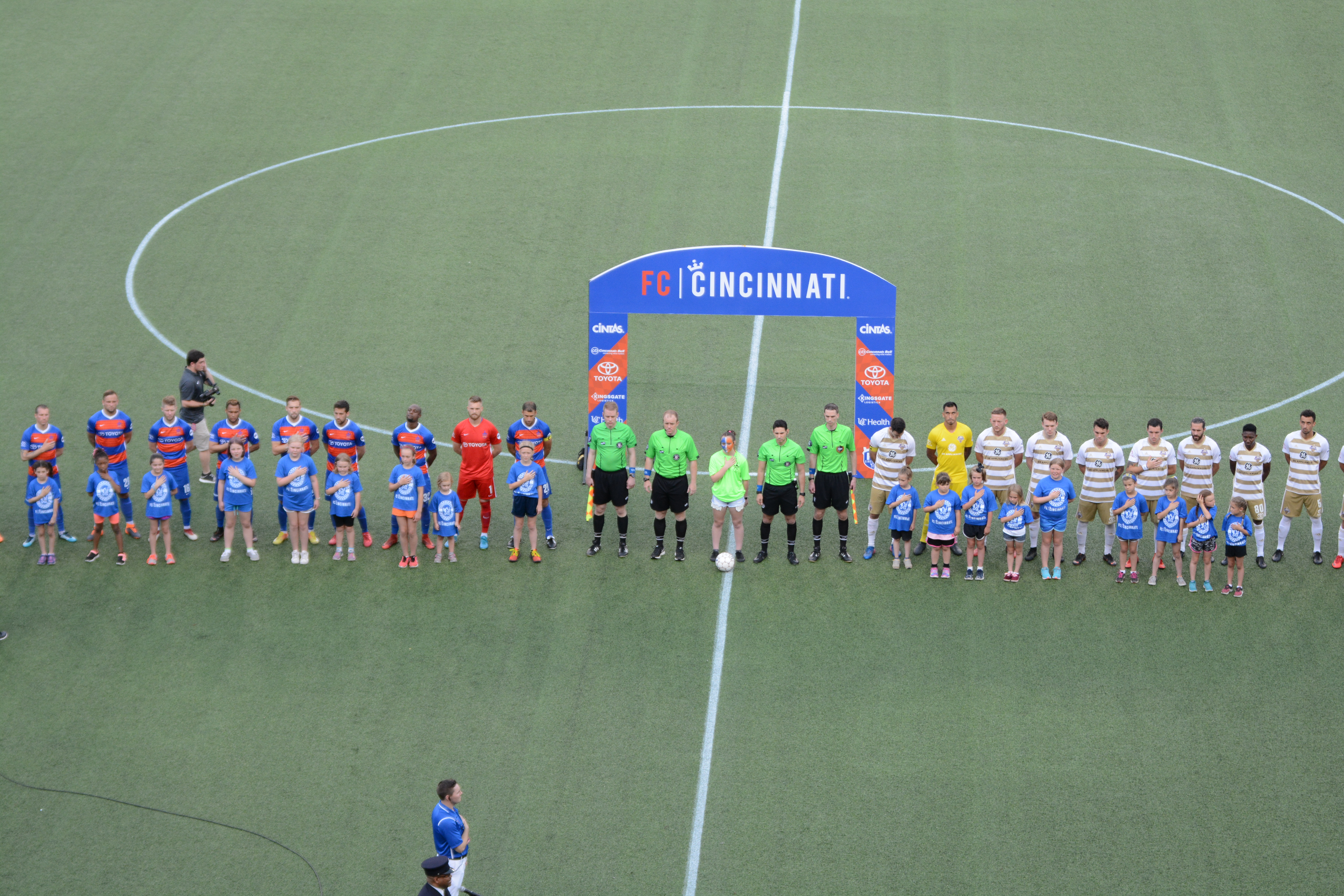
- FC Cincinnati vs Louisville City
- Owner: John Neace
- Manager: James O'Connor (before June 30th); John Hackworth (August 2nd–onwards)
- Stadium: Louisville Slugger Field
- USL: 2nd, Eastern
- U.S. Open Cup: Quarter-finals
- USL playoffs: Champions
- Top goalscorer: League: Cameron Lancaster (25 goals); All: Cameron Lancaster (28 goals)
- Highest home attendance: 10,686 (October 13 vs. Indy Eleven)
- Lowest home attendance: 6,009 (April 14 vs. Richmond Kickers)
- Average home league attendance: 7,888
- Biggest win: 0–6 (August 25 vs. Richmond Kickers)
- Biggest defeat: 4-1 (August 28 vs. Toronto FC II)
Home colors	Away colors	Third colors

The 2018 Louisville City FC season was the club's fourth season in Louisville, Kentucky playing in the United Soccer League, which as of 2018 is the second-tier league in the United States soccer league system.

The club began their pre-season campaign on February 24 before the league commenced on March 17. They also competed in the U.S. Open Cup entering in the second round. They entered the season as the reigning USL Cup champions and became the first team in USL history to successfully defend their title.

== Current squad ==
final roster

No.	Name	Nationality	Date of birth (age)	Previous club
Goalkeepers
1	Greg Ranjitsingh	(Trinidad and Tobago)	July 18, 1993 (age 33)	(United States) Mercer University
13	Chris Hubbard	(United States)	November 23, 1994 (age 31)	(United States) University of Notre Dame
28	Tim Dobrowolski	(United States)	September 7, 1993 (age 33)	(United States) Loyola University Chicago
Defenders
3	Alexis Souahy	(France)	January 13, 1995 (age 31)	(United States) Bowling Green State University
4	Sean Totsch	(United States)	September 16, 1991 (age 35)	(United States) Rochester Rhinos
5	Paco Craig	(England)	October 19, 1992 (age 34)	(United States) Young Harris College
15	Pat McMahon	(United States)	November 5, 1986 (age 39)	(United States) FC Cincinnati
21	Shaun Francis	(Jamaica)	October 2, 1986 (age 40)	(United States) Montreal Impact
24	Kyle Smith	(United States)	January 9, 1992 (age 34)	(United States) Transylvania University
Midfielders
6	Magnus Rasmussen	(Denmark)	April 18, 1993 (age 33)	(Denmark) BK Frem
10	Brian Ownby	(United States)	July 16, 1990 (age 36)	(United States) Richmond Kickers
11	Niall McCabe	(Republic of Ireland)	October 6, 1990 (age 36)	(United States) Chattanooga FC
17	Jose Carranza	(United States)	January 18, 1999 (age 27)	(United States) Atlanta United 2
19	Oscar Jimenez	(United States)	November 3, 1989 (age 37)	(United States) Mississippi Brilla
22	George Davis IV	(United States)	August 5, 1987 (age 39)	(United States) Richmond Kickers
23	Richard Ballard	(United States)	January 26, 1994 (age 32)	(United States) Indiana University
27	Napo Matsoso	(Lesotho)	May 27, 1994 (age 32)	(United States) University of Kentucky
36	Paolo DelPiccolo	(United States)	May 28, 1991 (age 35)	(United States) Charlotte Independence
80	Devon Williams	(Jamaica)	April 8, 1992 (age 34)	(United States) New York Red Bulls II
Forwards
9	Cameron Lancaster	(England)	November 5, 1992 (age 33)	(England) St Albans City
12	Luke Spencer	(United States)	November 28, 1990 (age 35)	(United States) FC Cincinnati
14	Ilija Ilić	(Serbia)	April 26, 1991 (age 35)	(United States) Young Harris College

== Transfers ==
=== In ===
No.	Pos.	Player	Transferred from	Fee/notes	Date	Source
6	MF	(Denmark) Magnus Rasmussen	(Denmark) Boldklubben Frem	Free Transfer	January 4, 2018	
13	GK	(United States) Chris Hubbard	(United States) University of Notre Dame	Free Transfer	January 11, 2018	
3	DF	(France) Alexis Souahy	(United States) Bowling Green State University	Free Transfer	January 15, 2018	
15	DF	(United States) Pat McMahon	(United States) FC Cincinnati	Free Transfer	December 5, 2017	
21	DF	(Jamaica) Shaun Francis	(United States) Montreal Impact	Free Transfer	March 9, 2018	
17	MF	(United States) Jose Carranza	(United States) Atlanta United 2	Free Transfer	August 20, 2018	
27	MF	(Lesotho) Napo Matsoso	(United States) Mississippi Brilla	Free Transfer	September 14, 2018	

=== Out ===
No.	Pos.	Player	Transferred to	Fee/notes	Date	Source
13	GK	(United States) Micah Bledsoe	(United States) Nashville SC	Free Transfer	February 9, 2018	
15	DF	(United States) Sean Reynolds	(United States) Saint Louis FC	Free Transfer	December 9, 2017	
8	MF	(Israel) Guy Abend	(United States) Reno 1868 FC	Free Transfer	December 12, 2017	
7	MF	(Canada) Mark-Anthony Kaye	(United States) Los Angeles FC	Undisclosed Fee	February 5, 2018	
6	DF	(United States) Tarek Morad	(United States) Tampa Bay Rowdies	Free Transfer	August 8, 2018	

=== Loans in ===
No.	Pos.	Player	Loaned from	Fee/notes	Start date	End date	Source
9	DF	(United States) James Sands	(United States) New York City FC	Undisclosed Fee	August 15, 2018	September 1, 2018	
39	FW	(United States) Jonathan Lewis	(United States) New York City FC	Undisclosed Fee	September 15, 2018	October 13, 2018	

== Competitions ==
=== Pre-season ===
February 24, 2018 Friendly	Louisville City FC	3–1	Young Harris College	Jeffersonville, Indiana
11:00AM EST	Lancaster 56'; Rasmussen 65'; McCabe 90'	Report	Young Harris Forward 56'	Stadium: Woehrle Soccer Complex

March 3, 2018 Friendly	Northern Kentucky University	0–4	Louisville City FC	Highland Heights, Kentucky
1:00PM EST		Report	Smith 6'; Spencer 15', 24'; McCabe 88'	Stadium: NKU Soccer Stadium

March 7, 2018 Friendly	Lipscomb University	0–3	Louisville City FC	Elizabethtown, Kentucky
7:30PM EST		Report	Lancaster 17'; Rasmussen 41'; Davis IV 47'; Totsh (yellow card) 60'	Stadium: Elizabethtown Sports Park

March 10, 2018 Friendly	Saint Louis FC	1–1	Louisville City FC	Evansville, Indiana
5:00PM EST	3' (o.g.)	Report	McCabe 72'	Stadium: Arad McCutchan Stadium

=== USL ===
==== Eastern Conference standings ====
Pos	Team	Pld	W	D	L	GF	GA	GD	Pts	Qualification
1	FC Cincinnati (X)	34	23	8	3	72	34	+38	77	Conference Playoffs
2	Louisville City FC (C)	34	19	9	6	71	38	+33	66	Conference Playoffs
3	Pittsburgh Riverhounds SC	34	15	14	5	47	26	+21	59	Conference Playoffs
4	Charleston Battery	34	14	14	6	47	34	+13	56	Conference Playoffs
5	New York Red Bulls II	34	13	13	8	71	59	+12	52	Conference Playoffs

Source: 2018 USL standings
Rules for classification: 1) total wins; 2) total goal differential; 3) total goals scored; 4) points earned against top four Conference finishers; 5) disciplinary points; 6) coin toss or drawing of lots
(C) Champions; (X) Regular Season League Champion

==== Results summary ====
Overall								Home						Away					
Pld	W	D	L	GF	GA	GD	Pts	W	D	L	GF	GA	GD	W	D	L	GF	GA	GD
34	19	9	6	71	38	+33	66	9	5	3	32	21	+11	10	4	3	39	17	+22

Last updated: October 13, 2018.
Source: Match reports

Round	1	2	3	4	5	6	7	8	9	10	11	12	13	14	15	16	17	18	19	20	21	22	23	24	25	26	27	28	29	30	31	32	33	34
Stadium	H	H	A	H	A	H	A	A	H	A	A	H	A	H	H	A	A	H	A	H	A	H	A	A	H	H	H	A	A	H	A	A	H	H
Result	W	W	W	W	D	W	L	L	W	W	D	D	D	L	D	W	L	W	W	D	W	D	W	W	L	D	L	D	W	W	W	W	W	W

Updated to match(es) played on October 13, 2018. Source: Match reports
A = Away; H = Home; W = Win; D = Draw; L = Loss

==== Results ====
March 17 1	Louisville City FC	2–0	Nashville SC	Louisville, Kentucky
3:00PM	Spencer 56', (yellow card) 81'; McCabe 66'	Report	LaGrassa (yellow card) 79'	Stadium: Louisville Slugger Field; Attendance: 7,933; Referee: Ismir Pekmic; Assistant referees: Maggie Short; Kevin Lock; Fourth official: Brandon Artis

March 31 2	Louisville City FC	1–0	Tampa Bay Rowdies	Louisville, Kentucky
7:30PM	McMahon (yellow card) 26'; Jimenez 69'	Report	Hristov (yellow card) 60'; Collins (yellow card) 70'	Stadium: Louisville Slugger Field; Attendance: 6,336; Referee: Jon Freemon; Assistant referees: Paul Terry; Chad Collins; Fourth official: Aaron Hernandez

April 7 3	FC Cincinnati	0–1	Louisville City FC	Cincinnati, Ohio
7:00PM	Ledesma (yellow card) 35'	Report	Lancaster 13', (yellow card) 47'; Ilić (yellow card) 90+5'	Stadium: Nippert Stadium; Attendance: 25,667; Referee: Joseph Dickerson; Assistant referees: Cory Richardson; Jame Duling; Fourth official: William Gaither III

April 14 4	Louisville City FC	2–1	Richmond Kickers	Louisville, Kentucky
7:30PM	Smith 64' (pen.); Davis IV 90+1'	Report	Shriver 18'; Cordovés (yellow card) 66'	Stadium: Louisville Slugger Field; Attendance: 6,009; Referee: Joshua Brooks; Assistant referees: Kevin Lock; Matthew Seem; Fourth official: Johann Pedolzky

April 21 5	Atlanta United 2	1–1	Louisville City FC	Lawrenceville, Georgia
7:00PM	Shannon (yellow card) 51'; Carleton 90+1' (pen.)	Report	Totsch (yellow card) 44'; Lancaster 66'; Williams (yellow card) 84'; Ownby (yellow card) 90'	Stadium: Coolray Field; Attendance: 4,135; Referee: Elvis Osmanovic; Assistant referees: Jon Skinner; Kevin Huet; Fourth official: Amin Hadzic

April 28 6	Louisville City FC	3–1	Bethlehem Steel FC	Louisville, Kentucky
7:30PM	Lancaster 13', 22'; Ilić 17'; Ownby (yellow card) 73'	Report	Mbaizo (yellow card) 24'; Epps 44'	Stadium: Louisville Slugger Field; Referee: David Barrie; Assistant referees: Benjamin Hall-Volpenhein; Kevin Lock; Fourth official: Casie Anderson

May 5 7	Indy Eleven	1–0	Louisville City FC	Indianapolis, Indiana
12:00PM	McInerney (yellow card) 67'; Ayoze 78' (pen.) (yellow card) 79'; Braun (yellow card) 90+5'; Fôn Williams (yellow card) 90+7'	Report	DelPiccolo (yellow card) 36'; Craig (yellow card) 77'; Ownby (yellow card) 90+2'	Stadium: Lucas Oil Stadium; Attendance: 9,008; Referee: Jon Freemon; Assistant referees: Adrienne McDonald; Jeffrey Swartzel; Fourth official: Eric Burton

May 13 8	Nashville SC	2–0	Louisville City FC	Nashville, Tennessee
6:00PM	Moloto 39', 84'; Bourgeois (yellow card) 49'; Doyle (yellow card) 59'; Washington (yellow card) 64'	Report	Lancaster (yellow card) 66'	Stadium: First Tennessee Park; Attendance: 8,610; Referee: Greg Dopka; Assistant referees: Walter Heartherly; Zach McWhorter; Fourth official: Joshua Nobles

May 19 9	Louisville City FC	2–1	Atlanta United 2	Louisville, Kentucky
7:30PM	Lancaster 24'; Craig (yellow card) 80'; Souahy (yellow card) 85'; Ilić 90+1' (pen.)	Report	Kissiedou 31', (yellow card) 69'; Carranza (yellow card) 72'; Nicklaw (yellow card) 90'; Gallagher (yellow card) 90+2'	Stadium: Louisville Slugger Field; Attendance: 8,683; Referee: Ismir pekmic Assistant referees: Benjamin Hall-Volpenhein; Jeffrey Swartzel; Fourth official: Chris Schurfanz

May 26 10	FC Cincinnati	0–2	Louisville City FC	Cincinnati, Ohio
7:30PM	Barrett (yellow card) 28'; Ryan (yellow card) 33'; Keinan (yellow card) 81'	Report	Lancaster 15'; Craig (yellow card) 55'; Davis IV 73'; Williams (yellow card) 85'	Stadium: Nippert Stadium; Attendance: 26,495; Referee: Ramy Touchan; Assistant referees: Kyle Longville; Dan Stupca; Fourth official: Adam Warner

June 9 11	Bethlehem Steel FC	0–0	Louisville City FC	Bethlehem, Pennsylvania
5:00PM	Fontana (yellow card) 45+5'; Chambers (yellow card) 58'	Report	Craig (yellow card) 48'; McMahon (yellow card) 90'	Stadium: Goodman Stadium; Attendance: 3,342; Referee: Lorant Varga; Assistant referees: Zeno (Gyu Ho) Cho; Joshua Encarnacion; Fourth official: Jay Hutchinson

June 16 12	Louisville City FC	3–3	Penn FC	Louisville, Kentucky
7:30PM	DelPiccolo 9'; Ilić 12', 45+1'	Report	Mkosana 1', 63'; Osae (yellow card) 32'; Baffoe 84'	Stadium: Louisville Slugger Field; Attendance: 7,978; Referee: JJ Bilinsk; Assistant referees: Chad Collins; Khary Williams

June 23 13	North Carolina FC	2–2	Louisville City FC	Cary, North Carolina
7:00PM	Ríos 11', 87', (yellow card) 76'; Kandziora (yellow card) 90+2'	Report	Craig 39'; Ilić 59'; McCabe (yellow card) 72'	Stadium: WakeMed Soccer Park; Attendance: 3,554; Referee: Rosendo Mendoza; Assistant referees: Tom Felice; Ryan Graves; Fourth official: Jeremy Smith

June 27 14	Louisville City FC	0–1	Pittsburgh Riverhounds	Louisville, Kentucky
7:30PM	Craig (yellow card) 85'	Report	Dabo (yellow card) 75'; Forbes 79'	Stadium: Louisville Slugger Field; Attendance: 7,126; Referee: Rubiel Vazquez; Assistant referees: Cory Richardson; Benjamin Hall-Volpenhein; Fourth official: Joshua Kelley

June 30 15	Louisville City FC	3–3	New York Red Bulls II	Louisville, Kentucky
7:30PM	Lancaster 8', 36'; Souahy (yellow card) 28'; Ownby (yellow card) 40'; DelPiccolo (yellow card) 45+5'; Ranjitsingh (yellow card) 64'; McCabe (yellow card) 67'; Rasmussen 90+5'	Report	Ndam (yellow card) 20'; White 49'; Cásseres Jr. 64' (pen.); Barlow 87'	Stadium: Louisville Slugger Field; Attendance: 7,689; Referee: Javier Santos Escobar; Assistant referees: Brooke Mayo; Jeffrey Swartzel; Fourth official: Aaron Hernandez

July 7 16	Tampa Bay Rowdies	1–2	Louisville City FC	St. Petersburg, Florida
7:30PM	Flemmings 71'	Report	Smith 22'; Craig (yellow card) 41'; Williams (yellow card) 44'; McMahon (yellow card) 51'; Lancaster 76'; DelPiccolo (yellow card) 88'	Stadium: Al Lang Stadium; Attendance: 5,232; Referee: Guido Gonzales; Assistant referees: Amilcar Sicaju; Albert Escovar; Fourth official: Alexander Derostaing

July 14 17	Charleston Battery	2–1	Louisville City FC	Charleston, South Carolina
7:00PM	Guerra 5'; Hackshaw 27'; Woodbine (yellow card) 35'; Anunga (yellow card) 70'; Kuzminsky (yellow card) 90'	Report	Smith (yellow card) 73'; Mueller 88' (o.g.); Davis IV (yellow card) 90+1'; Jimenez (red card) 90+7'	Stadium: MUSC Health Stadium; Attendance: 2,451; Referee: Greg Dopka; Assistant referees: Walter Heatherly; Dallas Rosier; Fourth official: James Boswell

July 21 18	Louisville City FC	4–1	Charlotte Independence	Louisville, Kentucky
7:30PM	McCabe 21'; Ilić 72' (pen.); Lancaster 81'; Davis IV 87'	Report	George (yellow card) 71'; Herrera 90'	Stadium: Louisville Slugger Field; Attendance: 8,006; Referee: Lorant Varga; Assistant referees: Cory Richardson; Chris Schurfranz; Fourth official: Johann Pedolzky

July 28 19	Ottawa Fury FC	0–3	Louisville City FC	Ottawa, Ontario
2:00PM	Obasi (yellow card) 58'; Taylor (yellow card) 83'	Report	DelPiccolo 13'; Craig 47'; Williams 57'; Souahy (red card) 77'; Ranjitsingh (yellow card) 79'	Stadium: TD Place Stadium; Attendance: 4,096; Referee: Fabrizio Stasolla; Assistant referees: Philippe Bettez Quessy; Andre Pickler; Fourth official: Pierre-Luc Lauziere

August 5 20	Louisville City FC	2–2	Indy Eleven	Louisville, Kentucky
5:00PM	Ilić 17'; Jimenez (yellow card) 44'; Davis 59'; Ownby (yellow card) 90+2'	Report	McInerney 16', 21'; Ouimette (yellow card) 40'; Starikov (yellow card) 74'	Stadium: Louisville Slugger Field; Attendance: 8,437; Referee: Elvis Osmanovic; Assistant referees: John Krill; Matthew Rodman; Fourth official: Zachary McWhorter

August 10 21	New York Red Bulls II	4–6	Louisville City FC	Montclair, New Jersey
7:00PM	Tinari 7', (yellow card) 57'; Kutler 14'; Aguinaga 80'; Ndam 90+1' (pen.)	Report	Ilić 18', 53'; Smith (yellow card) 32'; Lancaster 43', 63', 88'; Davis IV 48'	Stadium: MSU Soccer Park at Pittser Field; Attendance: 713; Referee: Sergii Demianchuk; Assistant referees: Gjovalin Bori; Katarzyna Wasiak; Fourth official: Luis Arroyo

August 18 22	Louisville City FC	0–0	Nashville SC	Louisville, Kentucky
7:30PM	Totsch (yellow card) 68'; Francis (yellow card) 90+4'	Report	Mensah (yellow card) 84'	Stadium: Louisville Slugger Field; Attendance: 9,684; Referee: Ramy Touchan; Assistant referees: Maggie Short; Mike Nickerson; Fourth official: Joshua Brooks

August 22 23	Charlotte Independence	0–3	Louisville City FC	Matthews, North Carolina
7:30PM	Mwape (yellow card) 90'	Report	Lancaster 13' (pen.), 29', (yellow card) 42'; Spencer 65'	Stadium: Sportsplex at Matthews; Attendance: 2,189; Referee: Rubiel Vazquez; Assistant referees: Ryan Graves; Jordan Davis; Fourth official: John Rush

August 25 24	Richmond Kickers	0–6	Louisville City FC	Richmond, Virginia
7:00PM	Hlavaty (yellow card) 40'; Troyer (yellow card) 52'; Agyemang (yellow card) 56'; Nascimento (yellow card) 68'; Yearwood (yellow card) 87'	Report	Lancaster 33'; Davis IV 37'; Carranza 58'; McCabe 61'; Spencer 78', 82'	Stadium: City Stadium (Richmond); Attendance: 5,869; Referee: Eric Tattersall; Assistant referees: JC Griggs; Kristopher Garwood; Fourth official: Nicholas Seymour

August 28 25	Louisville City FC	1–4	Toronto FC II	Louisville, Kentucky
7:00PM	Sands (yellow card) 15'; Ilić 37', (yellow card) 53'; DelPiccolo (yellow card) 78'	Report	Endoh 28', 64'; Mohammed (yellow card) 33'; Eckenrode (yellow card) 47'; Kübel (yellow card) 54'; Johnson 70'; Campbell 90+3'	Stadium: Louisville Slugger Field; Attendance: 6,248; Referee: Lukasz Szpala; Assistant referees: Kevin Fikar; Khary Williams; Fourth official: Casie Anderson
Note: Match was originally scheduled for July 18 but was rescheduled to accommodate the Quarter Final U.S. Open Cup match against the Chicago Fire.

August 31 26	Louisville City FC	2–2	Charleston Battery	Louisville, Kentucky
7:30PM	Lancaster 18', 41'; Jimenez (yellow card) 62'	Report	Guerra (yellow card) 7'; Okonkwo 14'; Rittmeyer 21'; Candela (yellow card) 38'; Bolt (yellow card) 65'; Mueller (yellow card) 74'	Stadium: Louisville Slugger Field; Attendance: 6,971; Referee: Kevin Broadley; Assistant referees: Jeffrey Swartzel; Tom Felice; Fourth official: Eric Burton

September 11 27	Louisville City FC	0–1	FC Cincinnati	Louisville, Kentucky
7:00PM	DelPiccolo (yellow card) 90+3'	Report	Bone 23'; Richey (yellow card) 90+2'	Stadium: Louisville Slugger Field; Attendance: 10,009; Referee: Marcos DeOliveira; Assistant referees: Brooke Mayo; Benjamin Hall-Volpenhein; Fourth official: William Gaither III
Note: Match was suspended in the 38th minute due to downpours and lightning with FC Cincinnati having a 0–1 advantage. It was resumed on September 11.

September 15 28	Pittsburgh Riverhounds	2–2	Louisville City FC	Pittsburgh, Pennsylvania
7:00PM	Greenspan (yellow card) 69'; Ranjitsingh 86' (o.g.); Forbes 90+1' (pen.)	Report	Lancaster 31', (yellow card) 55'; Souahy 70'; Smith (yellow card) 90+4'	Stadium: Highmark Stadium; Attendance: 2,558; Referee: Farhad Dadkho; Assistant referees: Trent Robert Van Haitsma; Alicia Messer; Fourth official: Alfonso Fajardo

September 19 29	Penn FC	0–3	Louisville City FC	Harrisburg, Pennsylvania
6:30PM	Venter (yellow card) 40'	Report	McMahon (yellow card) 24' (yellow-red card) 73'; DelPiccolo 25'; McCabe 28'; Spencer 90+1' (pen.)	Stadium: FNB Field; Attendance: 2,095; Referee: Bardhyl Pashaj; Assistant referees: Tyler Wyrostek; Katarzyna Wasiak; Fourth official: Patrick Sudol

September 22 30	Louisville City FC	4–0	Ottawa Fury FC	Louisville, Kentucky
7:30PM	Davis IV (yellow card) 39', (goal) 45+1'; Lancaster 45+4', 83'; Souahy 78'	Report	Attakora (red card) 39'; Oliveira (red card) 58'	Stadium: Louisville Slugger Field; Attendance: 7,729; Referee: Matt Franz; Assistant referees: Jeffrey Swartzel; Chris Schurfranz

September 29 31	Atlanta United 2	1–4	Louisville City FC	Lawrenceville, Georgia
7:00PM	Williams (yellow card) 44', (goal) 71'; Metcalf (yellow card) 89'	Report	Cochran 24', 69' (o.g.); Smith 37'; Davis IV 41'	Stadium: Coolray Field; Attendance: 2,718; Referee: Eric Tattersall; Assistant referees: Ben Pilgrim; Ben Meyer; Fourth official: Carlos Pielago

October 5 32	Toronto FC II	1–3	Louisville City FC	Toronto, Ontario
8:00PM	Akinola (yellow card) 38'; Okello (yellow card) 67'; Perruzza 88'	Report	Ilić 11'; DelPiccolo (yellow card) 34'; Souahy 40'; Lancaster 81'	Stadium: Lamport Stadium; Attendance: 128; Referee: Pierre-Luc Lauziere

October 9 33	Louisville City FC	2–1	North Carolina FC	Louisville, Kentucky
7:00PM	Craig (yellow card) 25'; Lancaster 47', 84'; Jimenez (yellow card) 72'	Report	Ríos (yellow card) 29', (goal) 38'; Bekker (yellow card) 61'	Stadium: Louisville Slugger Field; Attendance: 6,693; Referee: Tim Ford; Assistant referees: Tom Felice; Cory Richardson; Fourth official: Chris Schurfranz
Note: Match was originally scheduled for March 24 but was postponed due to rain.

October 13 34	Louisville City FC	1–0	Indy Eleven	Louisville, Kentucky
7:30PM	DelPiccolo (yellow card) 25'; Souahy (yellow card) 31'; Lancaster 34' (pen.)	Report	Ouimette (yellow card) 51'; Moses (yellow card) 78'; Mares (yellow card) 82'	Stadium: Louisville Slugger Field; Attendance: 10,686; Referee: Greg Dopka; Assistant referees: Matthew Nelson; Danny Thornberry

==== USL playoffs ====
First round
October 20 – Nippert Stadium
#1 FC Cincinnati (p)	1 (6)
#8 Nashville SC	1 (5)
October 20 – MUSC Health Stadium
#4 Charleston Battery	0
#5 New York Red Bulls II	1
October 20 – Highmark Stadium
#3 Pittsburgh Riverhounds SC	2 (7)
#6 Bethlehem Steel FC (p)	2 (8)
October 20 – Louisville Slugger Field
#2 Louisville City FC	4
#7 Indy Eleven	1
October 20 – Championship Soccer Stadium
#1 Orange County SC	4
#8 Saint Louis FC	0
October 20 – Zions Bank Stadium
#4 Real Monarchs	0
#5 Reno 1868 FC	1
October 19 – PRFC Soccer Complex
#3 Phoenix Rising FC	3
#6 Portland Timbers 2	0
October 20 – Papa Murphy's Park
#2 Sacramento Republic FC	1
#7 Swope Park Rangers	2

Conference Semifinals
October 27 – Nippert Stadium
#1 FC Cincinnati	0
#5 New York Red Bulls II	1
October 27 – Louisville Slugger Field
#6 Bethlehem Steel FC	0
#2 Louisville City FC	2
October 27 – Championship Soccer Stadium
#1 Orange County SC	1
#5 Reno 1868 FC	0
October 26 – PRFC Soccer Complex
#3 Phoenix Rising FC	4
#7 Swope Park Rangers	2

Conference finals
November 2 – Louisville Slugger Field
#5 New York Red Bulls II	1
#2 Louisville City FC	5
November 3 – Championship Soccer Stadium
#1 Orange County SC	1
#3 Phoenix Rising FC	2

USL championship
November 8 – Lynn Stadium (ESPN2)
#2 Louisville City FC	1
#3 Phoenix Rising FC	0

==== Results ====
October 20 First round	Louisville City FC	4–1	Indy Eleven	Louisville, Kentucky
7:30 p.m. EDT	McCabe 29', 48' (yellow card) 66'; Ilić 42'; Lancaster 73'	Report	Mitchell (yellow card) 46'; Saad 67'; Ouimette (yellow card) 72'	Stadium: Louisville Slugger Field; Attendance: 6,763; Referee: Mark Allatin; Assistant referees: Ian McKay; Jeffrey Swartzel; Fourth official: Lukasz Szpala

October 27 Conference Semi-finals	Louisville City FC	2–0	Bethlehem Steel FC	Louisville, Kentucky
7:30 p.m. EDT	Ownby 34', 59' (yellow card) 79'; Smith (yellow card) 64'	Report	Moar (yellow card) 57'; Mbaizo (yellow card) 83'; Ofeimu (yellow card) 86'	Stadium: Louisville Slugger Field; Attendance: 6,881; Referee: Farhad Dadkho; Assistant referees: Walter Heatherly; Brooke Mayo; Fourth official: Ismir Pekmic

November 2 Conference finals	Louisville City FC	5–1	New York Red Bulls II	Louisville, Kentucky
7:30 p.m. EDT	Ilić 23' (pen.), (yellow card) 40'; Spencer 32'; Davis (yellow card) 61'; Craig (yellow card) 65'; Ownby (yellow card) 69', (goal) 81'; Williams 73', 75'; McCabe (yellow card) 80'	Report	Ndam (yellow card) 22'; Tinari (yellow card) 44'; Barlow 60'	Stadium: Louisville Slugger Field; Attendance: 10,059; Referee: Ramy Touchan; Assistant referees: Chris Elliott; Gjovalin Bori; Fourth official: Victor Rivas

November 8 Championship	Louisville City FC	1–0	Phoenix Rising FC	Louisville, Kentucky
8:00 PM EST	Smith (yellow card) 45'; Spencer 62', (yellow card) 90+1'; Ranjitsingh (yellow card) 90+3'	Report	Farrell (yellow card) 39'; Drogba (yellow card) 73'; Lambert (yellow card) 85'	Stadium: Lynn Stadium; Attendance: 7,025; Referee: Joseph Dickerson; Assistant referees: Eric Weisbrod; Logan Brown; Fourth official: Guido Gonzales Jr. Fifth official: Andrew Bigelow; Man of the Match: Spencer

=== U.S. Open Cup ===
Louisville City entered the 2018 U.S. Open Cup with the rest of the United Soccer League in the second round. Louisville reached the quarter finals of the competition for the first time in its history; the only non-MLS side to reach that round. This included a 3–2 victory over the New England Revolution of MLS; Louisville's first victory over an MLS side.

May 16 R2	Louisville City FC (Kentucky)	5–0	(New York (state)) Long Island Rough Riders	Louisville, Kentucky
7:00 PM EDT	Smith 25'; Ilić 37'; Spencer 68'; Ownby 81'; Lancaster 86'	Report		Stadium: Lynn Stadium; Referee: Brandon Artis

May 23 R3	Louisville City FC (Kentucky)	1–0	(Missouri) Saint Louis FC	Louisville, Kentucky
7:00 PM EDT	Totsch 68'	Report	Greig (yellow card) 80'	Stadium: Lynn Stadium; Attendance: 2,008; Referee: Joshua Brooks

June 5 R4	Louisville City FC (Kentucky)	3–2	(Massachusetts) New England Revolution	Louisville, Kentucky
7:00 PM EDT	Jimenez 11', (yellow card) 85'; Lancaster 37'; Ownby 62'	Report	Segbers 5'; McMahon 26' (o.g.); Agudelo (yellow card) 90+4'	Stadium: Lynn Stadium; Attendance: 5,196; Referee: Aaron Hernandez (Kentucky)

June 20 R5	Louisville City FC (Kentucky)	2–1	(Tennessee) Nashville SC	Louisville, Kentucky
7:00 PM EDT	Craig; DelPiccolo (yellow card) 35' (goal) 58'; Ownby (yellow card) 52'	Report	LaGrassa 68' (Davis IV)	Stadium: Lynn Stadium; Attendance: 4,463

July 18 QF	Chicago Fire (Illinois)	4–0	(Kentucky) Louisville City FC	Bridgeview, Illinois
TDB	Nikolić 16' (Katai); Katai 32' (Schweinsteiger); Collier (yellow card) 86' (goal) 90+2' (Corrales); Campos 90'	Report	Craig (yellow card) 62'; DelPiccolo (yellow card) 64'; Smith (red card) 84'; Totsch (yellow card) 89'; Rasmussen (red card) 90+3'	Stadium: Toyota Park; Attendance: 3,322; Referee: Nima Saghafi

== Player statistics ==
=== Top scorers ===
Place	Position	Number	Name	USL	U.S. Open Cup	USL Cup	Total
1	FW	9	(England) Cameron Lancaster	25	2	1	28
2	FW	14	(Serbia) Ilija Ilić	11	1	2	14
3	MF	22	(United States) George Davis IV	8	0	0	8
4	FW	12	(United States) Luke Spencer	5	1	2	8
5	MF	11	(Republic of Ireland) Niall McCabe	4	0	2	6
6	MF	10	(United States) Brian Ownby	0	2	3	5
7	MF	36	(United States) Paolo DelPiccolo	3	1	0	4
7	MF	24	(United States) Kyle Smith	3	1	0	4
9	DF	3	(France) Alexis Souahy	3	0	0	3
9	DF	5	(England) Paco Craig	2	1	0	3
9	MF	80	(Jamaica) Devon Williams	1	0	2	3
12	MF	19	(United States) Oscar Jimenez	1	1	0	2
13	MF	6	(Denmark) Magnus Rasmussen	1	0	0	1
13	MF	17	(United States) Jose Carranza	1	0	0	1
13	DF	4	(United States) Sean Totsch	0	1	0	1
Total				68	11	12	91

=== Assist leaders ===
Place	Position	Number	Name	USL	U.S. Open Cup	USL Cup	Total
1	MF	19	(United States) Oscar Jimenez	10	3	3	16
2	FW	14	(Serbia) Ilija Ilić	10	1	0	11
3	MF	11	(Republic of Ireland) Niall McCabe	4	0	2	6
4	MF	24	(United States) Kyle Smith	5	0	0	5
5	MF	36	(United States) Paolo DelPiccolo	4	0	0	4
5	MF	10	(United States) Brian Ownby	1	1	2	4
7	MF	22	(United States) George Davis IV	2	1	0	3
7	DF	5	(England) Paco Craig	3	0	0	3
9	MF	80	(Jamaica) Devon Williams	2	0	0	2
9	MF	6	(Denmark) Magnus Rasmussen	2	0	0	2
9	DF	21	(Jamaica) Shaun Francis	2	0	0	2
9	FW	9	(England) Cameron Lancaster	2	0	0	2
13	DF	4	(United States) Sean Totsch	1	0	0	1
13	FW	12	(United States) Luke Spencer	1	0	0	1
13	MF	8	(United States) James Sands	1	0	0	1
13	FW	39	(United States) Jonathan Lewis	1	0	0	1
13	MF	17	(United States) Jose Carranza	1	0	0	1
Total				52	6	7	65

=== Clean sheets ===
Place	Position	Number	Name	USL	U.S. Open Cup	USL Cup	Total
1	GK	1	(Trinidad and Tobago) Greg Ranjitsingh	11	0	2	13
2	GK	28	(United States) Tim Dobrowolski	0	2	0	2
Total				11	2	2	15

=== Disciplinary ===
No.	Pos.	Name	USL		U.S. Open Cup		USL Cup		Total	
No.	Pos.	Name	Yellow card	Red card	Yellow card	Red card	Yellow card	Red card	Yellow card	Red card
15	DF	(United States) Pat McMahon	4	1	0	0	0	0	4	1
24	MF	(United States) Kyle Smith	2	0	0	1	2	0	4	1
3	DF	(France) Alexis Souahy	3	1	0	0	0	0	3	1
19	MF	(United States) Oscar Jimenez	3	1	1	0	0	0	4	1
11	MF	(Denmark) Magnus Rasmussen	0	0	0	1	0	0	0	1
36	MF	(United States) Paolo DelPiccolo	8	0	1	0	0	0	9	0
5	DF	(England) Paco Craig	8	0	1	0	1	0	10	0
10	MF	(United States) Brian Ownby	5	0	0	0	2	0	7	0
9	FW	(England) Cameron Lancaster	4	0	0	0	0	0	4	0
80	MF	(Jamaica) Devon Williams	3	0	0	0	0	0	3	0
4	DF	(United States) Sean Totsch	2	0	1	0	0	0	3	0
11	MF	(Republic of Ireland) Niall McCabe	2	0	0	0	2	0	4	0
12	FW	(United States) Luke Spencer	1	0	0	0	1	0	2	0
14	FW	(Serbia) Ilija Ilić	1	0	0	0	1	0	2	0
1	GK	(Trinidad and Tobago) Greg Ranjitsingh	2	0	0	0	1	0	3	0
22	MF	(United States) George Davis IV	2	0	0	0	1	0	3	0
21	DF	(Jamaica) Shaun Francis	1	0	0	0	0	0	1	0
9	MF	(United States) James Sands	1	0	0	0	0	0	1	0
Total			48	3	4	2	11	0	63	5
