= Dirty River Derby =

Association football rivalry in the United States

River Cities Cup
- FC Cincinnati Louisville City
- Other names: Dirty River Derby
- Location: Ohio Valley
- First meeting: CIN 2–3 LOU; 2016 USL (April 16, 2016)
- Latest meeting: CIN 1–0 LOU; 2023 U.S. Open Cup (April 26, 2023)

Statistics
- Total meetings: 12
- Most wins: FC Cincinnati (6)
- Top scorer: Chandler Hoffman (LOU) (3 goals)
- All-time series: Cincinnati: 6 Drawn: 2 Louisville: 4
- Largest victory: LOU 5–0 CIN; 2017 USL (August 12, 2017)

The Dirty River Derby, also known as the River Cities Cup, is a rivalry between American soccer clubs representing Cincinnati, Ohio and Louisville, Kentucky. From 2016 to 2018, the cities were respectively represented in the second-tier league now known as the USL Championship by FC Cincinnati and Louisville City FC. Both teams played in the Eastern Conference of what was then known as the United Soccer League, and the River Cities Cup was contested solely in regular-season matches between the two sides, with the winner of the regular-season series claiming the cup. After the 2018 season, FC Cincinnati ceased USL operations, with the ownership group having been awarded a Major League Soccer franchise that began play under the FC Cincinnati name in 2019. From that point forward, the rivalry only takes place if the two teams are drawn together in the U.S. Open Cup, with the first such meeting after FC Cincinnati's arrival in MLS taking place in 2019.

The teams are located in cities situated on the Ohio River and are separated by roughly 100 miles of Interstate 71. The winner of the regular-season series won the cup for that year.

The last regular-season league match between the teams began on September 11, 2018 (resumed and completed on September 14 due to weather), with FC Cincinnati winning 1–0. The final cup holders are Louisville City, who retained the cup by winning the previous two regular-season matches that season.

== Beginnings ==
=== Previous clubs ===
Before the formation of Louisville City and FC Cincinnati, various soccer clubs, both professional and amateur, played in the respective regions. The Derby City Rovers played in the fourth-division Premier Development League and played at the Woehrle Sports Complex in Louisville's northern suburb, Jeffersonville, Indiana. The Louisville metropolitan area also housed two indoor soccer teams prior to Louisville City: the Louisville Lightning, who played in the Major Arena Soccer League from 2009 until 2013, and the Louisville Thunder who played in the American Indoor Soccer Association from 1984 until 1987.

The rivalry between the two cities long predates the arrival of professional soccer in the region; most notably, the largest universities in the two cities, the University of Cincinnati and University of Louisville, had a longstanding football rivalry that ended in 2013 due to conference realignment.

=== Formation of the USL clubs ===
Both clubs were formed in the early to mid 2010s. The formation of Louisville City FC began with the formation of the club's current supporters group, The Coopers, whom aimed to build a grassroots support base to bring a professional soccer team to Louisville. The following year, a local ownership group invited the owners of Orlando City to meet with the Coopers supporters group. In 2015, the team Louisville City was born and served as the USL affiliate for Orlando City as they jumped from USL to Major League Soccer. In 2016, the affiliation ended with Orlando City creating its own reserve team to field in USL.

That same year, reports swirled of USL seeking expansion into Cincinnati. The formation of the ownership group came from a partnership between the Cincinnati Bengals NFL franchise and the former soccer club in the region, the Cincinnati Kings, when Jeff Berding was named as part of the potential ownership group. In the summer of 2015, more details on the new club were announced. The Lindner family, of American Financial Group headquartered in Cincinnati, was announced the owner of the new club with Carl Lindner III representing the owners at the press conference. Subsequently, the team name "FC Cincinnati" was announced as the club's name, as well as their coach, and stadium.

=== Naming ===
While already unofficially known among fans as "The Dirty River Derby", an online poll by both clubs was released asking fans what their preferred name for the series cup would be. Amongst the options included the "River Cities Cup", the "Steamboat Cup", the "Royal Cup", the "100 Mile Cup" or the "Riverboat Rivalry Cup". On February 5, 2016, it was announced the "River Cities Cup" had won.

== Rivalry ==
=== First season (2016) ===
The two teams played their first match on April 16, 2016, at Nippert Stadium in Cincinnati in front of a then-USL-record crowd of 20,497. Cincinnati jumped to an early lead over Louisville with a sixth-minute goal from Austin Berry. Louisville's Chandler Hoffman scored the first hat-trick in series history, scoring three unanswered goals for Louisville in the next 30 minutes to give Louisville a 3–1 lead over Cincinnati. In the 40th minute, Louisville's Sean Reynolds received the first red card in series history and Louisville played the final 50 minutes down to ten men. Cincinnati was able to score a late goal in the 90th minute, but the match ended 3–2 in Louisville's favor. The return leg in Louisville ended as a scoreless draw as four yellow cards were dished out. Cincinnati would ultimately win the series in 2016 against Louisville, by earning a 2–0 victory on July 23, 2016. USL golden boot winner, Sean Okoli scored the insurance goal.

=== Biting controversy (2017) ===
External image
- Photos taken by EM Dash Photography allegedly show Djiby biting McCabe's face. In one photo, Djiby's face is directly pressed against McCabe's right cheek, and in another, a mark is visible on McCabe's cheek.

The rivalry continued into its second season when Louisville visited Cincinnati for a USL match on Saturday, April 22, 2017. Tensions rose between the clubs after an incident in the 87th minute, when Cincinnati forward Djiby Fall was shown a straight red card and then briefly had an exchange of words with Louisville midfielder Niall McCabe before exiting the pitch. In a post-match interview, Louisville head coach James O'Connor alleged Djiby bit McCabe's cheek during this exchange. FC Cincinnati denied the claims the next day, writing in a statement, "We have seen no evidence to substantiate the allegations made by Louisville City Head Coach James O'Connor and it is our belief his post-match comments are not true. [...] Any attempt to portray Djiby as a dirty player is extremely unfair."

Fans of both clubs clashed on social media for several days in the wake of the allegations. The USL's weekly disciplinary report, published the following Wednesday, announced that Djiby's red card suspension would be extended to six games for "major game misconduct", which they later confirmed was for biting an opponent. FC Cincinnati manager Jeff Berding sent out a newsletter to fans the next day, stating that the USL decision had come after a failed appeal attempt by Cincinnati. He wrote that the club respected the USL decision even though they disagreed with it, and that the club continued to support Djiby, stating, "[we] will welcome him when he returns and I hope you will do the same."

=== Rivalry continues (2017–2018) ===
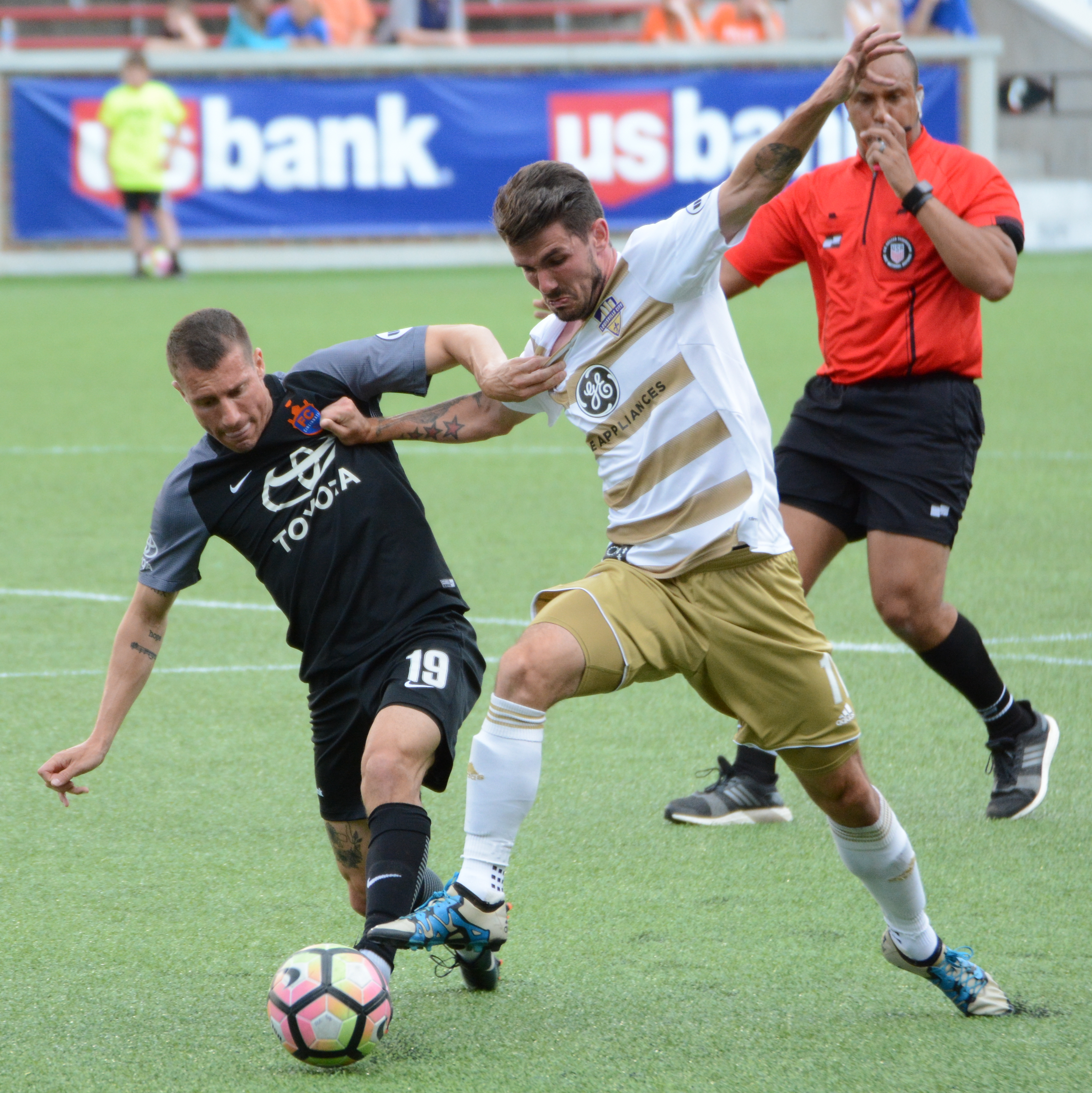
Corben Bone of Cincinnati and Niall McCabe of Louisville fight for the ball in the 2017 U.S. Open Cup.

Louisville and Cincinnati faced each other in their first non-USL match on May 31, 2017, when they met in the third round of the 2017 U.S. Open Cup, again hosted in Cincinnati. Although Djiby's six-game suspension (originating from the previous Cincinnati–Louisville match) had not yet ended, he was allowed to play as in-league suspensions do not apply to the U.S. Open Cup. Cincinnati won 1–0, with Djiby scoring the sole goal at the 48th minute.

The two clubs did not meet again until the next season, when Louisville won 1–0 at FC Cincinnati's home opener on April 7, 2018. Lou City officially retained the cup for 2018 with a 2–0 win on May 26, also at Nippert Stadium. Cincinnati defeated Louisville 1–0 in the final regular season match between the two clubs on September 11, 2018.

=== FC Cincinnati leaves USL (2019–present) ===
FC Cincinnati moved up to Major League Soccer after the 2018 USL season, putting the two teams in different leagues for the first time. The cup is no longer officially recognized since the teams are not guaranteed to compete every season. The two teams have since met twice in the U.S. Open Cup; in the fourth round of the 2019 U.S. Open Cup on June 12, 2019, at Nippert Stadium, and in the third round of the 2023 U.S. Open Cup on April 26, 2023, at TQL Stadium.

== Results ==
Home team is listed on the left, away team is listed on the right. Home team's score is listed first.

Cincinnati win Louisville win Draw

April 16, 2016 USL	FC Cincinnati	2–3	Louisville City FC	Cincinnati, OH
7:00 PM EDT	Berry 6'; Okoli (yellow card) 9'; Delbridge (yellow card) 31'; McMahon 90+2'	USL Report; FCC Report; LC Report	Hoffman 17' (pen.), 24', 33'; Reynolds (yellow card) 28' (yellow-red card) 40'; Montano (yellow card) 89'	Stadium: Nippert Stadium; Attendance: 20,497; Referee: Brandon Artis

June 25, 2016 USL	Louisville City FC	0–0	FC Cincinnati	Louisville, KY
7:30 PM EDT	Reynolds (yellow card) 45'	USL Report; FCC Report; LC Report	Delbridge (yellow card) 39'; Polak (yellow card) 41'; McMahon (yellow card) 61'	Stadium: Louisville Slugger Field; Attendance: 10,062; Referee: Brandon Artis

July 23, 2016 USL	FC Cincinnati	2–0	Louisville City FC	Cincinnati, OH
4:00 PM EDT	Wiedeman 39'; Berry (yellow card) 45'; Okoli 59'; Bone (yellow card) 72'	USL Report; FCC Report; LC Report	Lubahn (yellow card) 13'; Abend (yellow card) 30'; Quinn (yellow card) 50'	Stadium: Nippert Stadium; Attendance: 20,151; Referee: Alex Chilowicz

April 22, 2017 USL	FC Cincinnati	1–1	Louisville City FC	Cincinnati, OH
7:00 PM EDT	Mansaray (yellow card) 30'; Berry (yellow card) 50'; Walker (yellow card) 69'; Quinn 78'; Fall (red card) 86'	FCC Report; LOU Report; Box Score	Ownby 19'; Totsch (yellow card) 20'; DelPiccolo (yellow card) 83'	Stadium: Nippert Stadium; Attendance: 20,437; Referee: Mark Kadlecik

May 31, 2017 USOC	FC Cincinnati	1–0	Louisville City FC	Cincinnati, OH
7:00 PM EDT	Delbridge (yellow card) 27'; Djiby (yellow card) 38', (goal) 49'; Polak (yellow card) 90'	CIN Report; LOU Report; Box Score	Smith (yellow card) 42'; Abend (yellow card) 60'; Craig (yellow card) 91'	Stadium: Nippert Stadium; Attendance: 6,519; Referee: Brandon Artis; Assistant referees: Maggie Short; James Duling; Fourth official: James Ulrich
Note: Media related to FC Cincinnati vs. Louisville City FC, 2017-05-31 at Wikimedia Commons

July 15, 2017 USL	Louisville City FC	2–3	FC Cincinnati	Louisville, KY
7:30 PM EDT	Ilic 8' (pen.); Smith (yellow card) 27'; Davis IV (yellow card) 36'; DelPiccolo (yellow card) 78'; Wiedeman 90+3' (o.g.)	CIN Report; LOU Report	Djiby 16'; Bone (yellow card) 52'; Delbridge 55'; König 77'	Stadium: Louisville Slugger Field; Attendance: 11,632; Referee: Marcos de Oliveira

August 12, 2017 USL	Louisville City FC	5–0	FC Cincinnati	Louisville, KY
7:30PM	McCabe 16'; Spencer 45+2'; Kaye 57'; Ballard 72'; Reynolds 83'	USL Report	Schindler (yellow card) 13'; de Wit (red card) 36'; Walker (yellow card) 76'	Stadium: Louisville Slugger Field; Attendance: 13,812; Referee: Charles Murphy

April 7, 2018 USL	FC Cincinnati	0–1	Louisville City FC	Cincinnati, OH
7:00PM ET	Emmanuel Ledesma (yellow card) 35'	Report	Cameron Lancaster 13', (yellow card) 47'; Ilija Ilić (yellow card) 90+5'	Stadium: Nippert Stadium; Attendance: 25,667; Referee: Joseph Dickerson; Assistant referees: Cory Richardson; Jame Duling; Fourth official: William Gaither III
Note: Media related to FC Cincinnati vs. Louisville City FC, 2018-04-07 at Wikimedia Commons

May 26, 2018 USL	FC Cincinnati	0–2	Louisville City FC	Cincinnati, OH
7:30 EDT	Paddy Barrett (yellow card) 28'; Richie Ryan (yellow card) 33'; Dekel Keinan (yellow card) 81'	Report	Cameron Lancaster 15'; Paco Craig (yellow card) 55'; George Davis IV 73'; Devon Williams (yellow card) 85'	Stadium: Nippert Stadium; Attendance: 26,495; Referee: Ramy Touchan; Assistant referees: Kyle Longville; Dan Stupca; Fourth official: Adam Warner

September 11, 2018 USL	Louisville City FC	0–1	FC Cincinnati	Louisville, KY
7:00 EDT	DelPiccolo (yellow card) 90+3'	USL Report; CIN Report	Bone 23'; Richey (yellow card) 90+2'	Stadium: Louisville Slugger Field; Attendance: 10,009; Referee: Joshua Brooks

June 12, 2019 USOC	FC Cincinnati	2–1 (a.e.t.)	Louisville City FC	Cincinnati, OH
7:30 PM EDT	Adi 23' (yellow card) 117'; Manneh 103' (yellow card) 104'	Report	Mkosana 30'	Stadium: Nippert Stadium; Attendance: 6,895; Referee: Ismir Pekmic

April 26, 2023 USOC	FC Cincinnati	1–0	Louisville City FC	Cincinnati, OH
7:00 PM EDT	Jimenez (yellow card) 40'; Ordóñez 85'	Report		Stadium: TQL Stadium; Attendance: 10,062; Referee: Calin Radosav

== Top goalscorers ==
As of April 26, 2023. Does not include own goals.

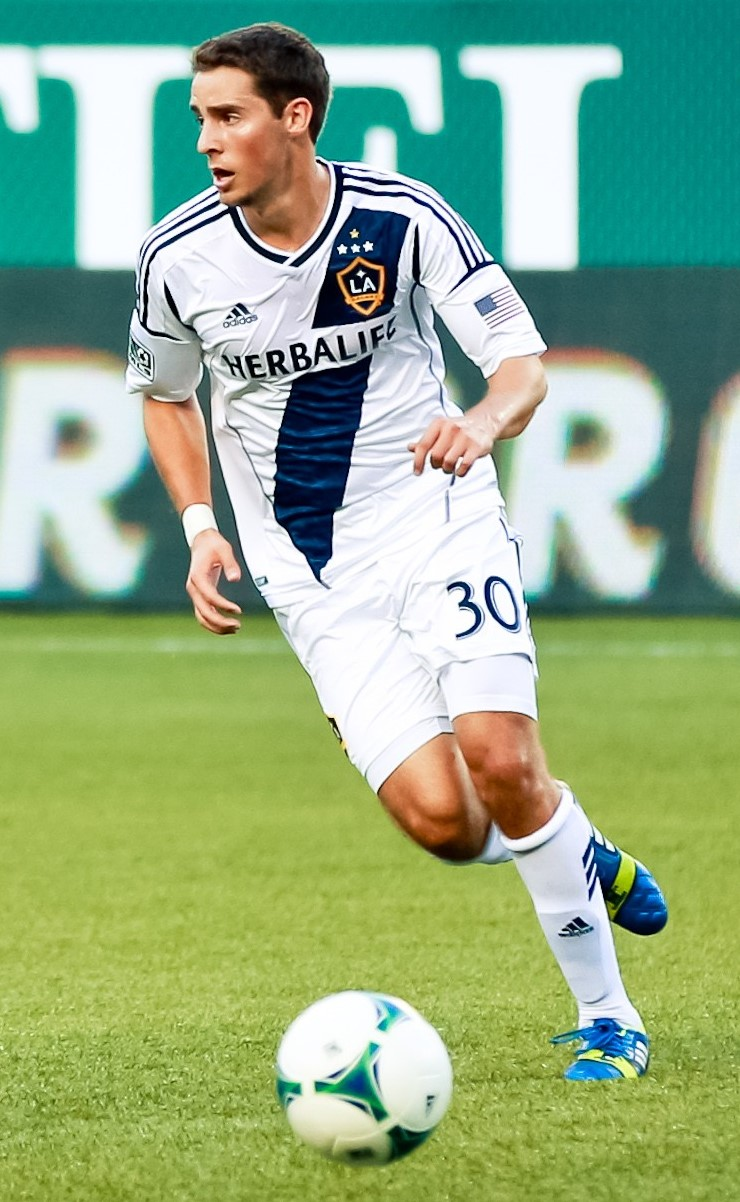
Top scorer, Chandler Hoffman

Position	Name	Team	Goals
1	(United States) Chandler Hoffman	Louisville City FC	3
2	(Senegal) Baye Djiby Fall	FC Cincinnati	2
2	(England) Cameron Lancaster	Louisville City FC	2
4	(Nigeria) Fanendo Adi	FC Cincinnati	1
4	(United States) Richard Ballard	Louisville City FC	1
4	(United States) Austin Berry	FC Cincinnati	1
4	(United States) Corben Bone	FC Cincinnati	1
4	(United States) George Davis IV	Louisville City FC	1
4	(Australia) Harrison Delbridge	FC Cincinnati	1
4	(Serbia) Ilija Ilić	Louisville City FC	1
4	(Canada) Mark-Anthony Kaye	Louisville City FC	1
4	(Denmark) Danni König	FC Cincinnati	1
4	(The Gambia) Kekuta Manneh	FC Cincinnati	1
4	(Republic of Ireland) Niall McCabe	Louisville City FC	1
4	(United States) Pat McMahon	FC Cincinnati	1
4	(Zimbabwe) Lucky Mkosana	Louisville City FC	1
4	(United States) Sean Okoli	FC Cincinnati	1
4	(United States) Arquimides Ordonez	FC Cincinnati	1
4	(United States) Brian Ownby	Louisville City FC	1
4	(United States) Aodhan Quinn	FC Cincinnati	1
4	(United States) Sean Reynolds	Louisville City FC	1
4	(United States) Luke Spencer	Louisville City FC	1
4	(United States) Andrew Wiedeman	FC Cincinnati	1

== Players who played for both clubs ==
As of April 25, 2023

Player	Louisville City FC career			FC Cincinnati career		
Player	Span	Apps	Goals	Span	Apps	Goals
(United States) Aodhan Quinn	2015–2016	57	5	2017	17	2
(United States) Kadeem Dacres	2015–2016	59	9	2017	21	0
(United States) Luke Spencer	2017–2020	93	29	2016	11	0
(United States) Pat McMahon	2018–2021	37	1	2016–2017	28	1
(United States) Corben Bone	2020–2022	65	8	2016–2019	108	16
(United States) Jimmy McLaughlin	2021	21	3	2016–2020	92	11
(United States) Tyler Gibson	2021–2023	71	0	2018	9	0
