= River Cities =

River Cities could refer to:

- the River Cities (train), a passenger train operated by Amtrak
- River Cities Futbol Club, a defunct American women's soccer team
- River Cities LocoMotives, a defunct American indoor football team
- River Cities' Reader, an alternative newspaper in Davenport, Iowa
- River Cities Cup, a soccer rivalry between FC Cincinnati and Louisville City FC
