= Cincinnati–Louisville rivalry (disambiguation) =

Cincinnati–Louisville rivalry may refer to:

- Cincinnati–Louisville rivalry, a college rivalry between University of Cincinnati and University of Louisville
  - The Keg of Nails, a traveling trophy awarded to the winner of the Cincinnati Bearcats vs. Louisville Cardinals football game
- River Cities Cup, a soccer rivalry between FC Cincinnati and Louisville City FC
