= Jonathan Lewis (soccer) =

American soccer player (born 1997)

Personal information
- Full name: Jonathan Jeremy Lewis
- Date of birth: June 4, 1997 (age 29)
- Place of birth: Atlanta, Georgia, U.S.
- Height: 5 ft 7 in (1.70 m)
- Position: Winger

Team information
- Current team: Lexington SC
- Number: 77

Youth career
- 2008–2014: Plantation Eagles
- 2014–2015: Chicago Fire
- 2015: RIASA
- 2015–2016: Kendall SC

College career
Years	Team	Apps	(Gls)
2016	Akron Zips	22	(2)

Senior career*
Years	Team	Apps	(Gls)
2015	Bradford City	0	(0)
2015	→ Farsley Celtic (loan)	1	(0)
2017–2019	New York City FC	31	(3)
2018	→ Louisville City (loan)	5	(0)
2019–2024	Colorado Rapids	144	(26)
2022–2024	Colorado Rapids 2	5	(1)
2025	Barnsley	5	(1)
2026–	Lexington SC	5	(0)

International career^{‡}
2016–2017	United States U20	6	(1)
2019–2021	United States U23	3	(1)
2019–2021	United States	8	(2)
- * Club domestic league appearances and goals as of 11:28, 9 November 2026 (UTC) ‡ National team caps and goals as of February 14, 2024

Jonathan Jeremy Lewis (born June 4, 1997) is an American professional soccer player who plays as a winger for USL Championship club Lexington SC.

Born in Atlanta but raised in Plantation, Florida, Lewis began his career with the Plantation Eagles and the Chicago Fire before being selected to join RIASA in England. There, he attracted interest from a few clubs before signing with League One side Bradford City in July 2015. After a short loan to Farsley Celtic, Lewis returned to the United States and began playing college soccer for the Akron Zips. Following his freshman season, Lewis was selected with the third overall pick by New York City FC in the 2017 MLS SuperDraft.

Lewis spent two and a half seasons with New York City FC, including a short loan at Louisville City, before being traded to the Colorado Rapids in May 2019. Internationally, Lewis initially represented the United States at the under-20 level before making his senior debut in January 2019 against Panama. He was selected as part of the squad for both the 2019 and 2021 Gold Cup squads.

== Early life ==
Born in Atlanta, Georgia, Lewis was raised in Plantation, Florida and attended South Plantation High School. His father is Jamaican and his mother was born in London, England but has family from Trinidad and Tobago. Growing up, Lewis would play pickup games with family members and friends, who he credited with helping him grow his interest in the sport: "My family being Caribbean and British, all they ever did is play and watch soccer. I really liked it from the time I was little; and being in South Florida, so multicultural, soccer was so big down here."

Lewis began playing organized soccer with youth club Plantation Eagles. In 2014, Lewis moved to Illinois and joined the youth academy at the Chicago Fire. He stayed with the academy for a season before returning to Florida. In 2015, Lewis participated in a trial event in Orlando for the Richmond International Academic and Soccer Academy (RIASA) where he was invited to join the academy in England. Lewis impressed scouts for various clubs while participating in friendly matches for RIASA, being invited to trial with Middlesbrough, Fulham, and Bradford City.

On July 7, 2015, Lewis joined League One side Bradford City on a professional two-year contract, initially training with the club's under-18 side. In September 2015, Lewis was loaned out to Northern Premier League side Farsley Celtic where he played in one match before returning to Bradford City. He then left Bradford City on October 12 and returned to the United States, citing homesickness.

== College ==
In August 2016, it was announced that Lewis will play college soccer with the Akron Zips at the University of Akron. He made his collegiate debut on August 26, coming on as a substitute in a 1–0 victory over the Georgetown Hoyas. Two days later, on August 28, Lewis made his first starting appearance in another 1–0 victory against the Seattle Redhawks. He scored his first goal for the Zips on October 26, the first goal in a 2–0 victory over the Ohio State Buckeyes.

On November 13, Lewis started in Akron's 2–1 victory against the Buffalo Bulls which qualified the Zips for the 2016 postseason. Lewis started in both the first and second round for the Zips against the Villanova Wildcats and Indiana Hoosiers. The Zips defeated Villanova 2–0 before succumbing to a 1–0 away defeat against Indiana, knocking them out of the tournament. On November 11, 2021, Lewis was named as the Mid-American Conference Freshman of the Year.

== Club career ==
=== New York City FC ===
On January 7, 2017, it was announced that Lewis had signed a Generation Adidas contract with Major League Soccer and was available to be selected in the 2017 MLS SuperDraft. On January 13, Lewis was selected with the third overall pick by New York City FC, after Abu Danladi and Miles Robinson. He made his debut for the club on March 18, 2017, against the Montreal Impact, coming on as a substitute in a 1–1 draw at Yankee Stadium. Lewis was named into the starting line-up for the first time on July 22 in a 2–1 home victory against the Chicago Fire.

Lewis scored his first professional goal on August 12, the opening goal in a 2–0 away victory against the LA Galaxy. He then scored the winning goal for New York City FC in their next match against the New England Revolution, a late stoppage time winner to give the club a 2–1 victory. Lewis finished his first professional season with 13 appearances, scoring just the two goals.

In June 2018, after the departure of head coach Patrick Vieira, Lewis was hopeful that he could see more time on the pitch under Domènec Torrent. Despite that, Lewis continued to feature on the bench for New York City FC and ended his 2018 season with just 14 appearances, all from the bench, and just one goal.

==== Louisville City (loan) ====
On September 17, 2018, due to lack of playing time with New York City FC, Lewis joined United Soccer League side Louisville City until the end of the 2018 season. He made his debut for the club on September 19, starting in the 3–0 victory against Penn FC. During his time on loan, Lewis played in five matches for Louisville City.

=== Colorado Rapids ===
Finding himself on the bench for New York City FC to start the 2019 season, Lewis was traded to the Colorado Rapids on May 8, 2019, in exchange for $650,000 in targeted allocation money. A few days later, on May 11, Lewis made his debut for the Rapids, starting in a 3–2 defeat against Real Salt Lake. He scored his first goal for the club on May 25 in a 3–2 home victory against the Columbus Crew. He scored his second goal for the Rapids on May 29, an equalizer in a 1–1 draw against the Philadelphia Union.

On December 17, 2020, Lewis signed a new contract with the Colorado Rapids, keeping him at the club until 2024.

=== Barnsley ===
On February 13, 2025, Lewis returned to England, joining EFL League One club Barnsley on a short-term deal until the end of the season. He suffered from injury during his time with the club. He was released by Barnsley at the end of the 2024–25 season.

=== Lexington SC ===
On March 3, 2026 Lexington SC announced they had signed Lewis to a contract for the 2026 USL Championship season.

== International career ==
=== Youth ===
In February 2017, Lewis was selected into the United States under-20 squad for the CONCACAF U-20 Championship in Costa Rica. At the time, Lewis was also being scouting by the Jamaica Football Federation. He made his first appearance for the side on February 21 in their second group stage match against Haiti, playing 71 minutes in the 4–1 victory. He then scored his first goal in their next match against Saint Kitts and Nevis, the second in another 4–1 victory, guaranteeing the United States qualification into the knockout stages. Despite helping the team qualify for that year's FIFA U-20 World Cup, Lewis wasn't selected into the squad due to a lack of game time with New York City FC.

On October 4, 2019, Lewis was call into the United States under-23 team by Jason Kreis. He made his debut for the side on October 15 against El Salvador, scoring the second goal in a 6–1 victory. In March 2021, Lewis was named into the final 20-man roster for the CONCACAF Men's Olympic Qualifying Championship.

=== Senior ===
On December 28, 2018, Lewis was named in Gregg Berhalter's first United States squad for international friendlies against Panama and Costa Rica. He proceeded to make his senior debut on January 27 against Panama, coming on as a 66th-minute substitute for Jeremy Ebobisse in a 3–0 victory. On May 24, 2019, after a bright start to his career with the Colorado Rapids, Lewis was named into the United States preliminary roster for the CONCACAF Gold Cup. He was then selected into Berhalter's final 23-man squad on June 6. During the tournament, Lewis made one appearance against Panama but was an unused substitute for the duration, including the final, a 1–0 loss against Mexico.

Lewis scored his first goals for the United States on January 31, 2021, a brace in a 7–0 victory over Trinidad and Tobago in an international friendly. On July 1, Lewis was named by Berhalter into his second CONCACAF Gold Cup squad.

== Career statistics ==
=== Club ===
As of match played April 5, 2025

Appearances and goals by club, season and competition
Club	Season	League			League cup (Note: Includes MLS Cup playoffs)		National cup (Note: Includes U.S. Open Cup)		Other		Total	
Club	Season	Division	Apps	Goals	Apps	Goals	Apps	Goals	Apps	Goals	Apps	Goals
Bradford City	2015–16	League One	0	0	—		—		—		0	0
Farsley Celtic (loan)	2015–16	NPL Division One	1	0	—		1	0	—		2	0
New York City FC	2017	MLS	11	2	1	0	1	0	—		13	2
New York City FC	2018	MLS	14	1	—		1	0	—		15	1
New York City FC	2019	MLS	6	0	—		—		—		6	0
New York City FC	Total		31	3	1	0	2	0	0	0	34	3
Louisville City (loan)	2018	USL	5	0	—		—		—		5	0
Colorado Rapids	2019	MLS	16	5	—		—		—		16	5
Colorado Rapids	2020	MLS	18	5	1	0	—		—		19	5
Colorado Rapids	2021	MLS	27	7	1	0	—		—		28	7
Colorado Rapids	2022	MLS	33	5	—		1	0	2 (Note: Appearances in CONCACAF Champions League)	0	36	5
Colorado Rapids	2023	MLS	26	1	—		3	3	—		29	4
Colorado Rapids	2024	MLS	24	3	2	0	—		7 (Note: Appearances in Leagues Cup)	1	33	4
Colorado Rapids	Total		144	26	4	0	4	3	9	1	161	30
Colorado Rapids 2	2022	MLS Next Pro	2	1	—		—		—		2	1
Colorado Rapids 2	2023	MLS Next Pro	1	0	—		—		—		1	0
Colorado Rapids 2	2024	MLS Next Pro	2	0	—		—		—		2	0
Colorado Rapids 2	Total		5	1	0	0	0	0	0	0	5	1
Barnsley	2024–25	League One	5	1	—		-		—		5	1
Career total			191	31	5	0	7	3	9	1	212	35

=== International ===
As of match played August 1, 2021

Appearances and goals by national team and year
National team	Year	Apps	Goals
United States	2019	5	0
United States	2020	1	0
United States	2021	2	2
Total		8	2

As of match played August 1, 2021. United States score listed first, score column indicates score after each Lewis goal.

List of international goals scored by Jonathan Lewis
No.	Date	Venue	Cap	Opponent	Score	Result	Competition	Ref.
1	January 31, 2021	Exploria Stadium, Orlando, United States	7	Trinidad and Tobago	1–0	7–0	International friendly	
2	January 31, 2021	Exploria Stadium, Orlando, United States	7	Trinidad and Tobago	6–0	7–0	International friendly	

== Honors ==
United States U20

- CONCACAF Under-20 Championship: 2017

United States

- CONCACAF Gold Cup: 2021
