= George Davis IV =

American soccer player (born 1987)

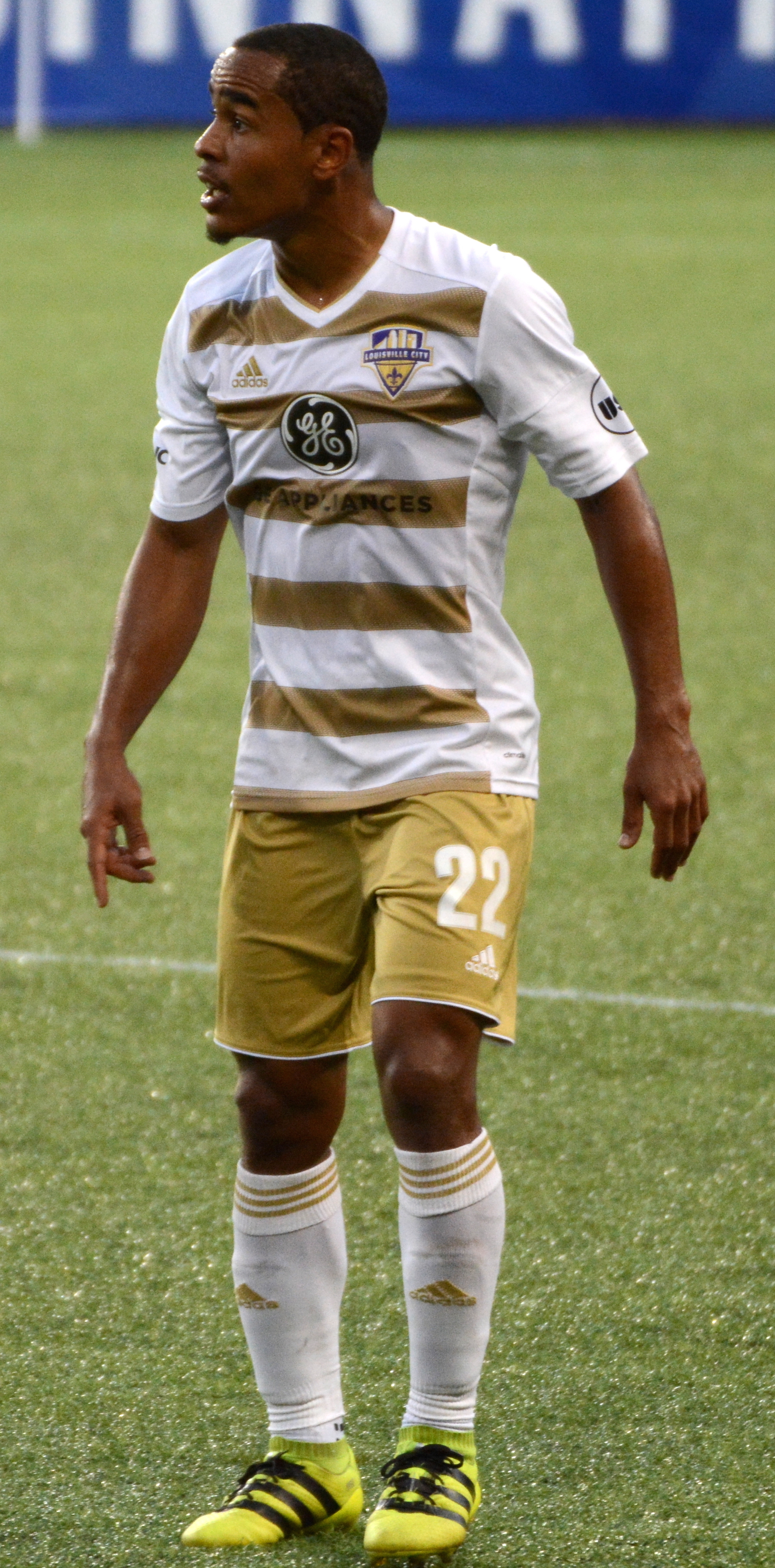
- Davis playing for Louisville City in 2017

Personal information
- Full name: George Davis IV
- Date of birth: August 5, 1987 (age 39)
- Place of birth: Lima, Ohio, United States
- Height: 5 ft 8 in (1.73 m)
- Position: Forward

College career
Years	Team	Apps	(Gls)
2005–2006	Bowling Green Falcons		
2007–2009	Kentucky Wildcats		

Senior career*
Years	Team	Apps	(Gls)
2006	Cleveland Internationals	3	(0)
2010–2011	Dayton Dutch Lions	39	(12)
2012–2013	Los Angeles Blues	39	(8)
2012	→ Orlando City (loan)	7	(0)
2014–2015	Richmond Kickers	53	(19)
2016–2021	Louisville City	123	(23)

Managerial career
- 2012–2016: Northwestern Ohio Racers (assistant)
- 2016–2017: Hanover Panthers (assistant)
- 2018: Louisville City (joint interim)
- * Club domestic league appearances and goals as of November 5, 2021

George Davis IV (born August 5, 1987) is an American former professional soccer player who previously played for Louisville City FC in the USL Championship. Currently, he is the Director of the LouCity & Racing Foundation.

== Early life ==
=== Personal ===
Davis was born in Dayton, Ohio, to George Davis III. He attended Elida High School where he played soccer; lettering in the sport for three years. While at Elida he was named to the Western Buckeye League All League team three times and was named to the All-Northwest District All District team twice.

=== College and youth ===
Davis played two years of college soccer at Bowling Green State University between 2005 and 2006. During his two seasons at Bowling Green Davis would appear in 36 matches; starting 32; and score three goals with two assists.

Prior to this Junior year Davis transferred and played two years of college soccer at the University of Kentucky between 2007 and 2009. During his two seasons at Kentucky Davis appeared in 26 matches and score two goals with three assists. During his Junior year Davis and Kentucky reached the championship game of the 2009 Conference USA Men's Soccer Tournament but lost on penalties to Tulsa. The final goal of his college career came in his final game as a Senior when he came off the bench in the 2009 Conference USA Men's Soccer Tournament against Tulsa. After the tournament Davis was named to the Conference USA All Tournament team.

In 2006 Davis also played with the Cleveland Internationals in the USL Premier Development League going goalless over three matches.

== Club career ==
=== Dayton Dutch Lions ===
Following his final season at Kentucky, Davis joined the Dayton Dutch Lions in 2010 for their debut season in the USL Premier Development League. He made his season debut on May 8 against the Cincinnati Kings and appeared in 16 matches for the club, scoring five goals and contributing seven assists.

Davis turned professional with the Lions following their self-promotion to the USL Professional Division in 2011. He made his professional debut on April 16, 2011, in the Lions' season-opening game against the Charleston Battery. He led the team with seven goals and two assists for 16 points, earning USL PRO All-League Second Team honors.

=== Los Angeles Blues ===
==== 2012 season ====
Davis signed with Los Angeles Blues of USL Pro on January 26 and made his season debut on April 14 against Rochester. He went on to appear in 12 of Los Angeles' first 14 league matches as well as their one U.S. Open Cup match against Ventura County; going goalless across all competitions.

===== Loan to Orlando =====
In mid July Davis was loaned to USL Pro side Orlando City SC and made his Orlando on July 14 against Rochester. He appeared in seven of Orlando's last eight league matches going goalless as Orlando won the USL regular season championship. Davis also played in Orlando's lone USL Cup match against Wilmington scoring a goal in stoppage time; his only goal of the 2012 campaign. Orlando lost the match 3–4.

==== 2013 season ====
Davis returned to the Los Angeles Blues for the 2013 season and made his season debut on March 23 against Phoenix FC where he scored the opening goal of Los Angeles' season. He became an integral part of Los Angeles' team appearing in 24 of their 26 league matches while scoring eight goals and would only miss matches due to a hamstring injury. He also appeared in one of Los Angeles' two U.S. Open Cup matches scoring one goal in a 1–2 loss to Chivas USA as well as their lone USL Cup match going goalless. After the season Davis was named to the USL All-League Second Team for the second time in his career.

=== Richmond Kickers ===
==== 2014 season ====
On February 28, Davis signed with United Soccer League side Richmond Kickers and made his season debut on March 29 against Charleston where he scored a brace. He appeared in all 28 of Richmond's league matches and was second on the team to Matthew Delicâte in both goals and points with 11 and 27 respectively. He also appeared in all three of Richmond's U.S. Open Cup matches scoring a goal in each as well appearing in both of Richmond's USL Cup matches going goalless. His league marks in both goals and points ranked in the top ten of all USL players and after the season Davis was named to the USL All-League First Team.

==== 2015 season ====
Davis returned to the Richmond Kickers, appeared in 25 of Richmond's 28 league matches, and made his season debut on March 28 against Wilmington. He scored eight goals in league play including his first professional Hat-trick on April 18 against Charlotte. His final goal of the league campaign came in Richmond's final game against Toronto FC II; earning them the sixth and final spot in the USL Cup playoffs. Davis then appeared in Richmond's lone USL Cup match failing to score a goal. He also appeared in two of Richmond's three U.S. Open Cup matches scoring one goal against the Jacksonville Armada.

=== Louisville City FC ===
==== 2016 season ====
On January 15, Davis signed with United Soccer League side Louisville City FC and he made his season debut on March 26 against Charlotte. He appeared in 27 of Louisville' 30 league matches and scored five goals to be the team's second leading goal scorer behind Chandler Hoffman. He also appeared in one of Louisville's two U.S. Open Cup matches going goalless as Louisville lost to Indy Eleven 2–1. In the USL Cup playoffs he appeared in all three of Louisville's matches and scored one goal in extra time against Richmond. Louisville eventually lost in the Eastern Conference final against New York Red Bulls II in a Penalty shoot-out.

==== 2017 season ====
Davis resigned with Louisville City FC on November 30, 2016 and made his season debut on March 25 against Saint Louis FC. He appeared in 26 of Louisville's 32 league matches and was tied for second on the team with Cameron Lancaster with 7 goals; including three in his final five league matches. He also appeared in both of Louisville's U.S. Open Cup matches as well as all four of their USL Cup matches going goalless in both competitions. Davis and Louisville went on to win the USL Cup Final against Swope Park

==== 2018 season ====
Davis had his contract renewed with Louisville City FC and he made his season debut on March 17 against USL expansion side Nashville SC. He went on to appear in 30 of Louisville's 34 league matches scoring eight goals. The third most on the team behind Cameron Lancaster and Ilija Ilić. On August 5 he scored his 50th goal in USL competition. Just the fourth player in the USL's modern era to do so. He also appeared in all five of Louisville's U.S. Open Cup matches as Louisville reached the quarter finals of the competition for the first time in its history. This included a 3–2 victory over the New England Revolution of MLS; Louisville's first victory over an MLS side. Davis also appeared in all four of Louisville's USL Cup playoff matches as he and Louisville went on to win the USL Cup Final against Phoenix.

Davis announced his retirement from professional soccer on January 20, 2022.

== Managerial career ==
=== University of Northwestern Ohio ===
Davis served as an assistant coach for the University of Northwestern Ohio under Gavin Oldham from 2012 until 2016. While Davis was on the coaching staff Northwestern Ohio made the 2014 NAIA national semi-final and won the 2015 WHAC Tournament Championship.

=== Hanover College ===
Davis joined the Hanover College coaching staff in 2016 as an assistant under Matt Wilkerson. Hanover won the HCAC tournament in 2017.

=== Louisville City FC ===
On July 1, 2018, was Davis appointed Joint Interim Manager of Louisville City FC as a player-manager along with teammates Luke Spencer and Paolo DelPiccolo following the departure of James O'Connor for Orlando City SC. He made his managerial debut on July 7 against Tampa Bay and amassed a 4–2–1 record before being replaced by John Hackworth. His last match as manager was on August 10 against New York Red Bulls II after which he returned to his player duties.

== Career statistics ==
Club	Season	League			Cup		Total	
Club	Season	Division	Apps	Goals	Apps	Goals	Apps	Goals
Dayton Dutch Lions	2011	USL Championship	23	7	1	0	24	7
Los Angeles Blues	2012	USL Championship	12	0	0	0	12	0
Los Angeles Blues	2013	USL Championship	25	8	1	0	26	8
Los Angeles Blues	Total		60	15	2	0	62	15
Orlando City SC (loan)	2012	USL Championship	8	1	0	0	8	1
Richmond Kickers	2014	USL Championship	30	11	2	3	32	14
Richmond Kickers	2015	USL Championship	26	8	2	1	28	9
Richmond Kickers	Total		64	20	4	4	68	24
Louisville City FC	2016	USL Championship	30	6	1	0	31	6
Louisville City FC	2017	USL Championship	30	7	2	0	32	7
Louisville City FC	2018	USL Championship	34	8	5	0	39	8
Louisville City FC	2019	USL Championship	32	3	3	0	35	3
Louisville City FC	2020	USL Championship	2	0	-	-	2	0
Louisville City FC	2021	USL Championship	9	0	-	-	9	0
Louisville City FC	Total		137	24	11	0	148	24
Career Total			261	59	17	4	278	63

== Honors ==
=== Club ===
Orlando City SC

- USL Regular Season (1): 2012

Louisville City FC

- USL Cup (2): 2017, 2018

=== Individual ===
- USL All League First Team (1): 2014
- USL All League Second Team (2): 2011, 2013
