= Kyle Smith (soccer, born 1992) =

American soccer player

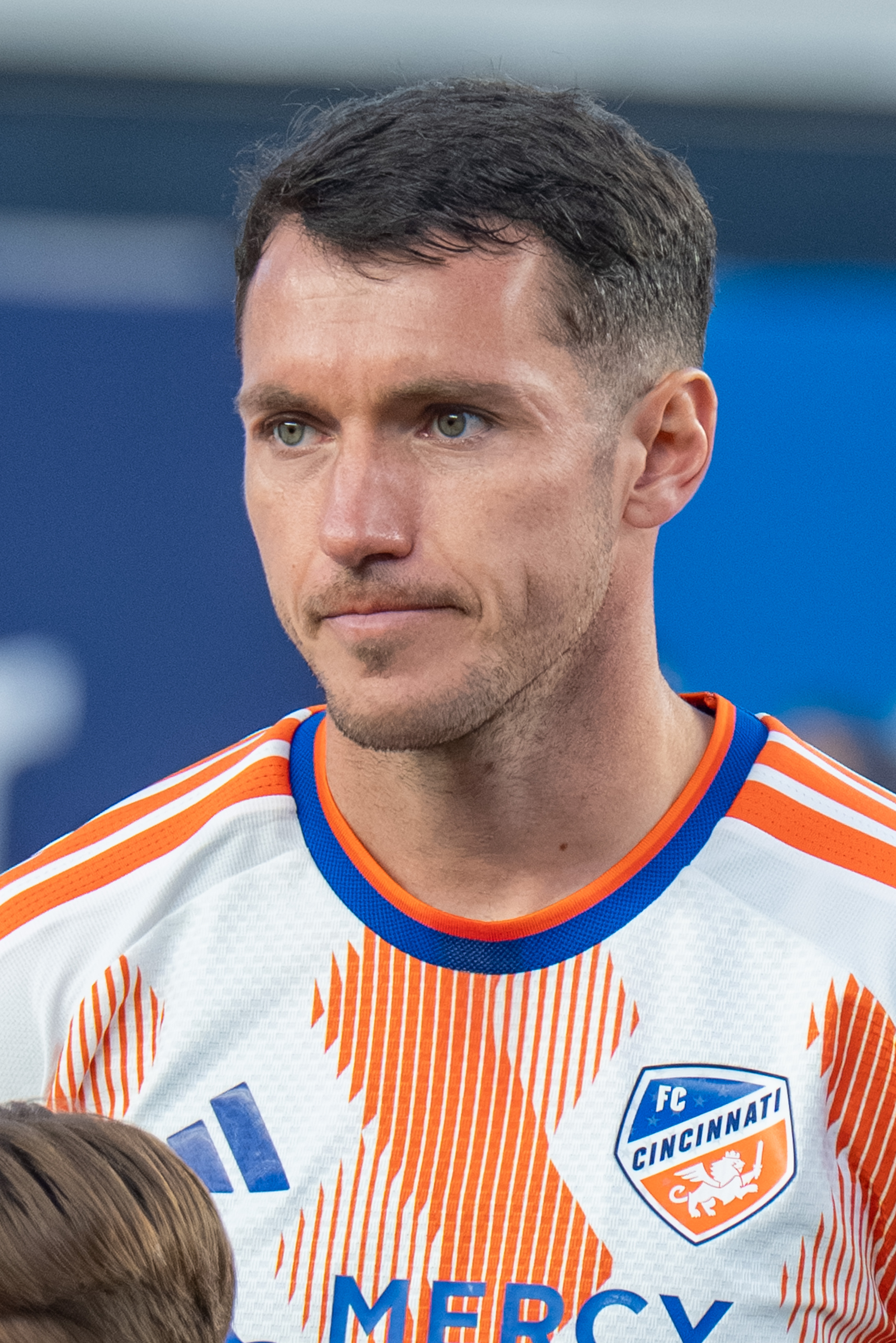
- Smith with FC Cincinnati in 2026

Personal information
- Full name: Kyle Joseph Smith
- Date of birth: January 9, 1992 (age 34)
- Place of birth: Cincinnati, Ohio, U.S.
- Height: 5 ft 11 in (1.80 m)
- Position: Defender

Team information
- Current team: FC Cincinnati
- Number: 24

College career
Years	Team	Apps	(Gls)
2010–2013	Transylvania Pioneers	76	(47)

Senior career*
Years	Team	Apps	(Gls)
2014–2015	Cincinnati Dutch Lions	27	(12)
2016–2018	Louisville City	85	(8)
2019–2025	Orlando City	178	(4)
2026–	FC Cincinnati	28	(1)
- * Club domestic league appearances and goals as of 00:04, November 8, 2026 (UTC)

Kyle Joseph Smith (born January 9, 1992) is an American professional soccer player who plays as a defender for Major League Soccer club FC Cincinnati.

Smith is an alumnus of the Transylvania Pioneers, and after the end of his college soccer career, he began as an amateur in the Premier Development League with the Cincinnati Dutch Lions. After two seasons playing at an amateur level, Smith signed his first professional contract with Louisville City in the United Soccer League in 2016. In the following two seasons, Smith helped Louisville City to back-to-back USL Cup championships. In late 2018, Smith signed with Major League Soccer franchise Orlando City, with whom he won the 2022 U.S. Open Cup and rose to second all-time in total appearances for the club. After six seasons with Orlando City, Smith joined FC Cincinnati in 2026.

== Early career ==
Smith was born in Cincinnati, Ohio and attended high school at La Salle. Smith played varsity soccer at La Salle for four years and was named to the Greater Catholic League South All League Second Team in 2008 and First Team in 2009. In 2009, he was named Greater Catholic League South soccer player of the year.

=== College ===
Smith played four years of college soccer at Transylvania University between 2010 and 2013, scoring a total of 47 goals during his four years. As a Junior, he set a Transylvania single season record for both goals and points with 18 and 40 respectively. As a Senior, Smith scored 18 goals with 8 assists earning Heartland Collegiate Athletic Conference Offensive MVP during his final seasons. He left Transylvania as the team's all-time leading in goals, assists, and points.

== Club career ==
=== Cincinnati Dutch Lions ===
After graduation, Smith played two seasons with Premier Development League expansion side Cincinnati Dutch Lions in both 2014 and 2015. In 2015 he was second in the PDL with eleven goals scored over 14 matches. He left the Dutch Lions as their all-time leader in goals, assists, and points with twelve, eight and thirty-two respectively, as well having set their season records in those categories in 2015.

=== Louisville City ===
==== 2016 season ====
After a successful trial Smith signed his first professional contract with United Soccer League side Louisville City on March 14 and he made his professional debut on March 26 against Charlotte Independence. He went on to appear in 26 of Louisville's 30 league matches with one goal that he scored on May 6 against Charleston Battery. He also appeared in one of Louisville's two U.S. Open Cup matches as well as all three of Louisville's USL Cup Playoff matches. Although he didn't score in regulation time during any of the USL Cup matches, he converted the first shot of the penalty shoot-out in the Eastern Conference final against New York Red Bulls II. A match that Louisville would go on to lose. During the season he was named USL mid-season Rookie of the Year.

==== 2017 season ====
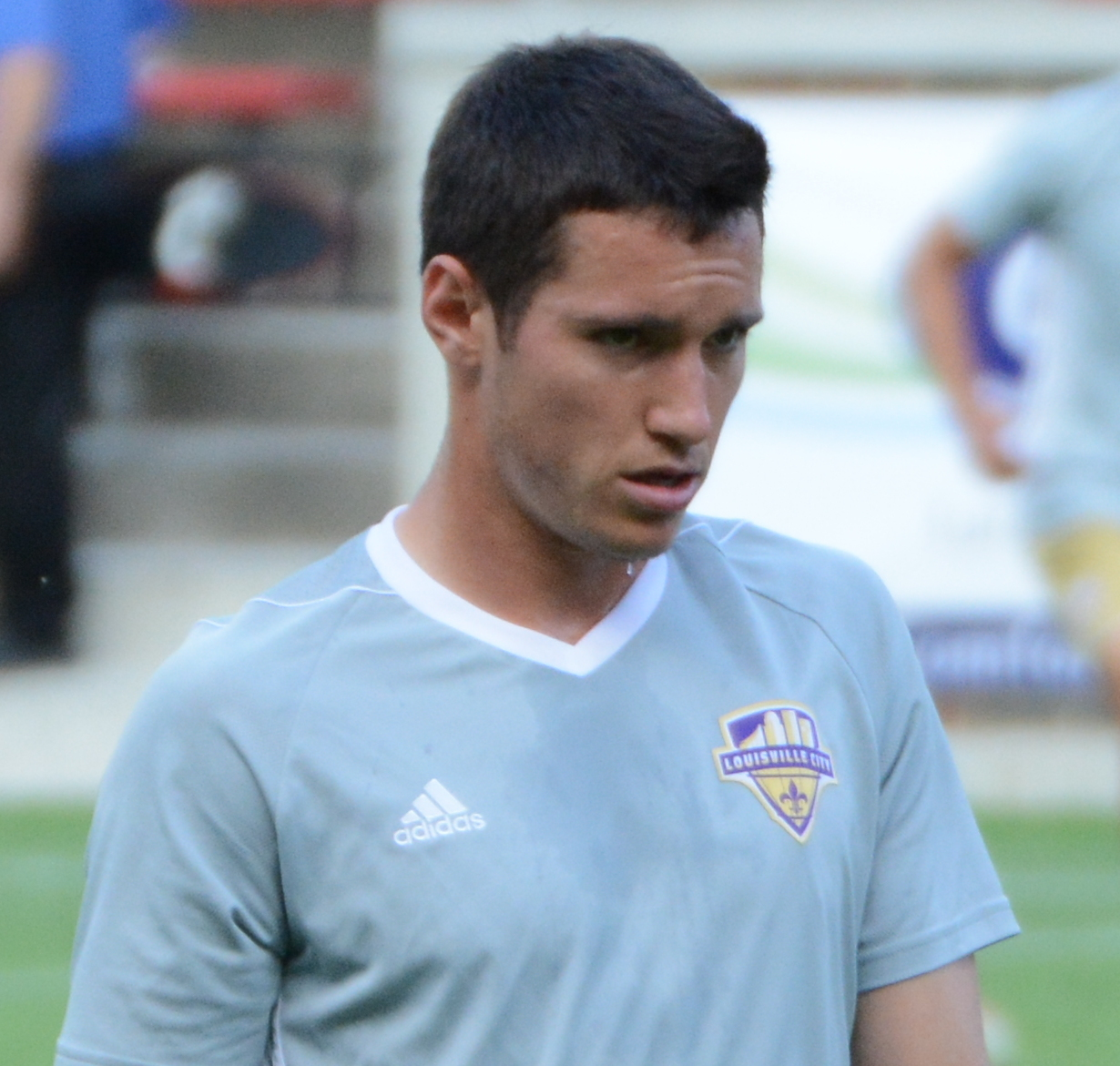
Smith with Louisville City in 2017

Smith remained with Louisville and made his season debut March 25 against Saint Louis FC. He appeared in 27 of Louisville's 32 league matches. Missing three matches while suspended for violent conduct and scoring four goals. He also appeared in one of Louisville's two U.S. Open Cup matches as all four of Louisville's USL Cup Playoff matches. Although he didn't score in regulation time during any of the USL Cup matches, he converted the first shot of the penalty shoot-out in the Eastern Conference final against New York Red Bulls II. Smith and Louisville won the USL Cup Final against Swope Park Rangers, with Smith being named Midseason USL Defender of the Year.

==== 2018 season ====
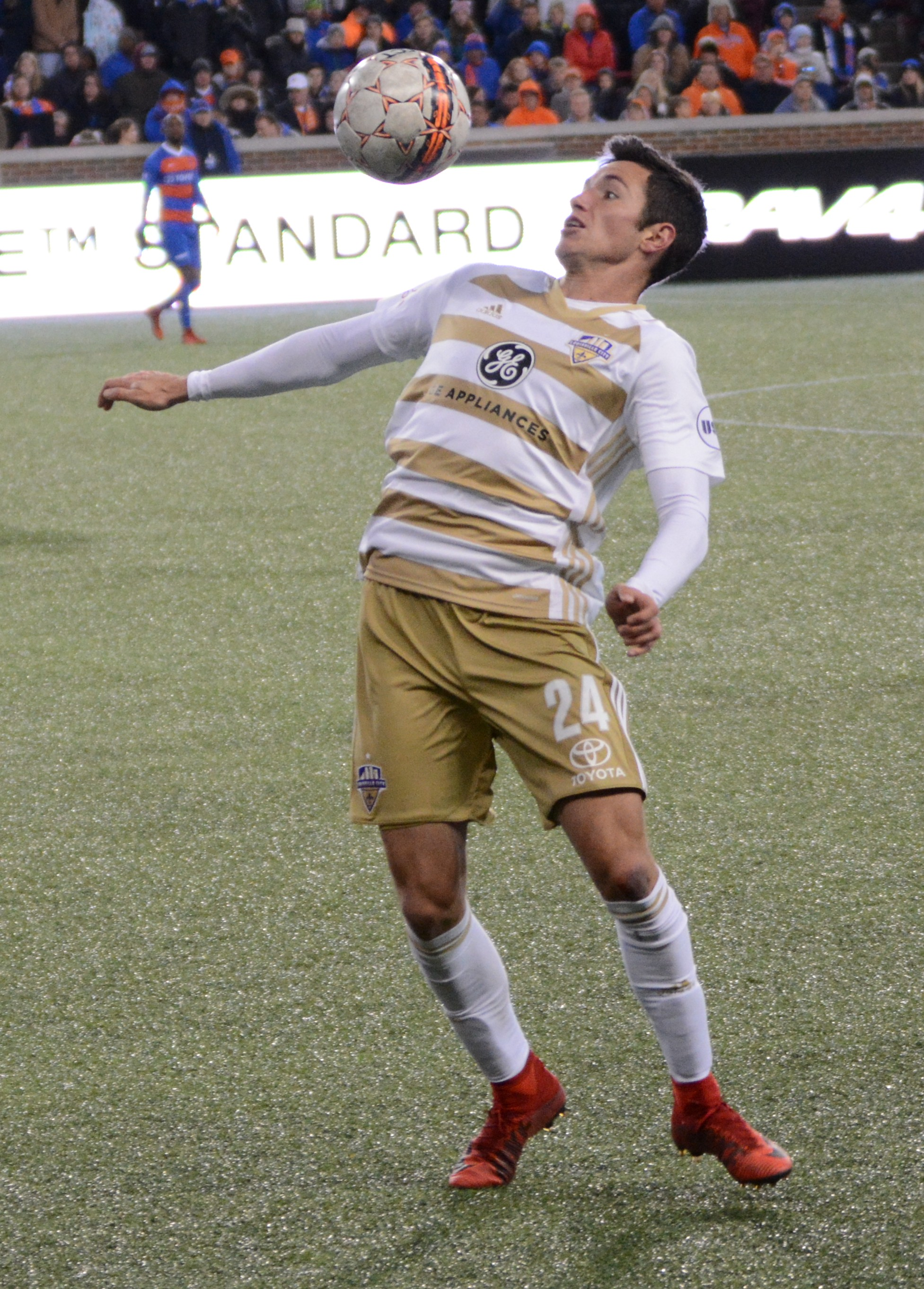
Smith with Louisville City in 2018

Smith had his contract renewed with Louisville and he made his season debut on March 17 against USL expansion side Nashville SC. He went on to appear in all but one of Louisville's 34 league matches and had more minutes played than any other Louisville player. He scored his first goal of the season on April 14 against the Richmond Kickers and he went on to score three goals in USL competition. He also appeared in all five of Louisville's U.S. Open Cup matches scoring one goal as Louisville reached the quarter-finals of the competition for the first time in its history. This included a 3–2 victory over Major League Soccer club New England Revolution; Louisville's first victory over an MLS side. He also appeared in all four of Louisville's USL Cup playoff matches going goalless. Smith and Louisville went on to win the USL Cup final for the second consecutive season, this time against Phoenix Rising.

=== Orlando City ===
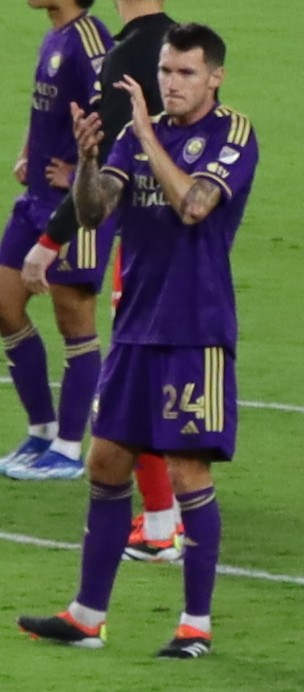
Smith with Orlando City in 2024

On December 19, 2018, Smith moved to Major League Soccer side Orlando City, reuniting him with head coach James O'Connor who had left Louisville earlier in the year. Smith made his first appearance for the club in the first match of the 2019 season when he started in a 2–2 draw against New York City FC on March 2 before he was taken off as a 69th-minute substitute for Dom Dwyer.

On March 29, 2021, Smith signed a new two-year deal with Orlando City, keeping him with the club through the end of the 2022 with an option for 2023. On July 30, Smith scored his first goal for the club when he scored the opener of a 3–2 win over Atlanta United.

On May 27, 2022, Smith was fined by the MLS Disciplinary Committee for his role in a confrontation between Orlando City and Austin FC players following a match between them five days earlier. On December 5, Orlando City announced that they had re-signed Smith to a one-year deal for the 2023 season with an option for 2024.

On February 27, 2024, Smith scored his first goal in international play when he scored the final goal of a 3–1 win over Cavalry FC in the 2024 CONCACAF Champions Cup. On December 13, it was announced that Smith had signed a 1-year contract which guaranteed him until the end of the 2025 season. On November 17, 2025, the team announced that they were in contract negotiations with Smith, but on December 16, Smith announced that he would be leaving the club at the expiration of his contract.

=== FC Cincinnati ===
On January 7, 2026, Smith returned to his native Cincinnati and signed with FC Cincinnati through the 2026 season with a team option for the 2027 season. Smith made his debut on February 18 in the CONCACAF Champions Cup, playing the full match as FC Cincinnati beat O&M with a 4–0 scoreline. On April 4, Smith scored his first goal for the club in a 4–2 loss at the New York Red Bulls.

== Personal life ==
Smith graduated from Transylvania University with a degree in accounting and worked as an accountant for the University of Cincinnati College of Medicine after graduation and before signing his first professional soccer contract. He is currently studying for the CPA exam and plans to be an accountant after retiring from soccer.

== Club statistics ==
As of match played November 19, 2026

Club	Season	League			Playoffs		U.S. Open Cup		CONCACAF Champions Cup		Other		Total	
Club	Season	Division	Apps	Goals	Apps	Goals	Apps	Goals	Apps	Goals	Apps	Goals	Apps	Goals
Cincinnati Dutch Lions	2014	Premier Development League	13	1	—		—		—		—		13	1
Cincinnati Dutch Lions	2015	Premier Development League	14	11	—		—		—		—		14	11
Cincinnati Dutch Lions	Total		27	12	—		—		—		—		27	12
Louisville City	2016	USL Championship	25	1	3	0	1	0	—		—		29	1
Louisville City	2017	USL Championship	27	4	4	0	1	0	—		—		32	4
Louisville City	2018	USL Championship	33	3	4	0	5	1	—		—		42	4
Louisville City	Total		85	8	11	0	7	1	—		—		103	9
Orlando City	2019	MLS	23	0	—		1	0	—		—		24	0
Orlando City	2020	MLS	16	0	2	0	—		—		4 (Note: Appearances in MLS is Back Tournament knockout rounds)	0	22	0
Orlando City	2021	MLS	27	1	0	0	—		—		1 (Note: Appearances in Leagues Cup)	0	28	1
Orlando City	2022	MLS	29	2	0	0	6	0	—		—		35	2
Orlando City	2023	MLS	25	1	3	0	0	0	1	0	3	0	32	1
Orlando City	2024	MLS	29	0	5	0	—		4	1	2	0	40	1
Orlando City	2025	MLS	29	0	0	0	1	0	—		5	0	35	0
Orlando City	Total		178	4	10	0	8	0	5	1	15	0	216	5
FC Cincinnati	2026	MLS	28	1	1	0	—		2	0	1	0	32	1
Career total			318	25	22	0	15	1	7	1	16	0	378	27

== Honors ==
Louisville City FC

- USL Cup (Note: Known since 2019 as the USL Championship final): 2017, 2018

Orlando City

- U.S. Open Cup: 2022
