= Jose Carranza (soccer, born 1999) =

American soccer player

Personal information
- Date of birth: January 18, 1999 (age 27)
- Place of birth: Manassas, Virginia, United States
- Height: 5 ft 7 in (1.70 m)
- Position: Midfielder

Team information
- Current team: Xinabajul
- Number: 18

Youth career
- 2013–2016: D.C. United

Senior career*
Years	Team	Apps	(Gls)
2017	North Carolina FC	9	(0)
2018	Atlanta United 2	13	(0)
2018	Louisville City	6	(1)
2022	Xelajú	16	(1)
2023-	Xinabajul	10	(0)

International career
2016	United States U18	4	(2)
- * Club domestic league appearances and goals as of October 15, 2018

Jose Carranza (born January 18, 1999) is an American soccer player for Liga Nacional club Xinabajul.

== Career ==
=== Youth and amateur ===
Carranza played for Northern Virginia SC before joining the D.C. United Academy in 2013. He played at different levels in the D.C. United Academy from 2013 to 2016.

On March 24, 2017, he signed an amateur contract with North American Soccer League side North Carolina FC.

=== Professional ===
Carranza signed his first professional contract with North Carolina FC on August 1, 2017.

Carranza signed with Atlanta United 2 for the first half of the 2018 season.

On August 20, 2018, Carranza joined USL side Louisville City FC as a free agent.

== International career ==
In 2014 Carranza joined the U.S. Soccer U-17 Residency Program. In October 2017 he was called up for the U-18 Men's National Team camp in Spain.

== Honors ==
=== Club ===
Louisville City FC

- USL Cup (1): 2018
