= Luke Spencer (soccer) =

German-born American soccer player

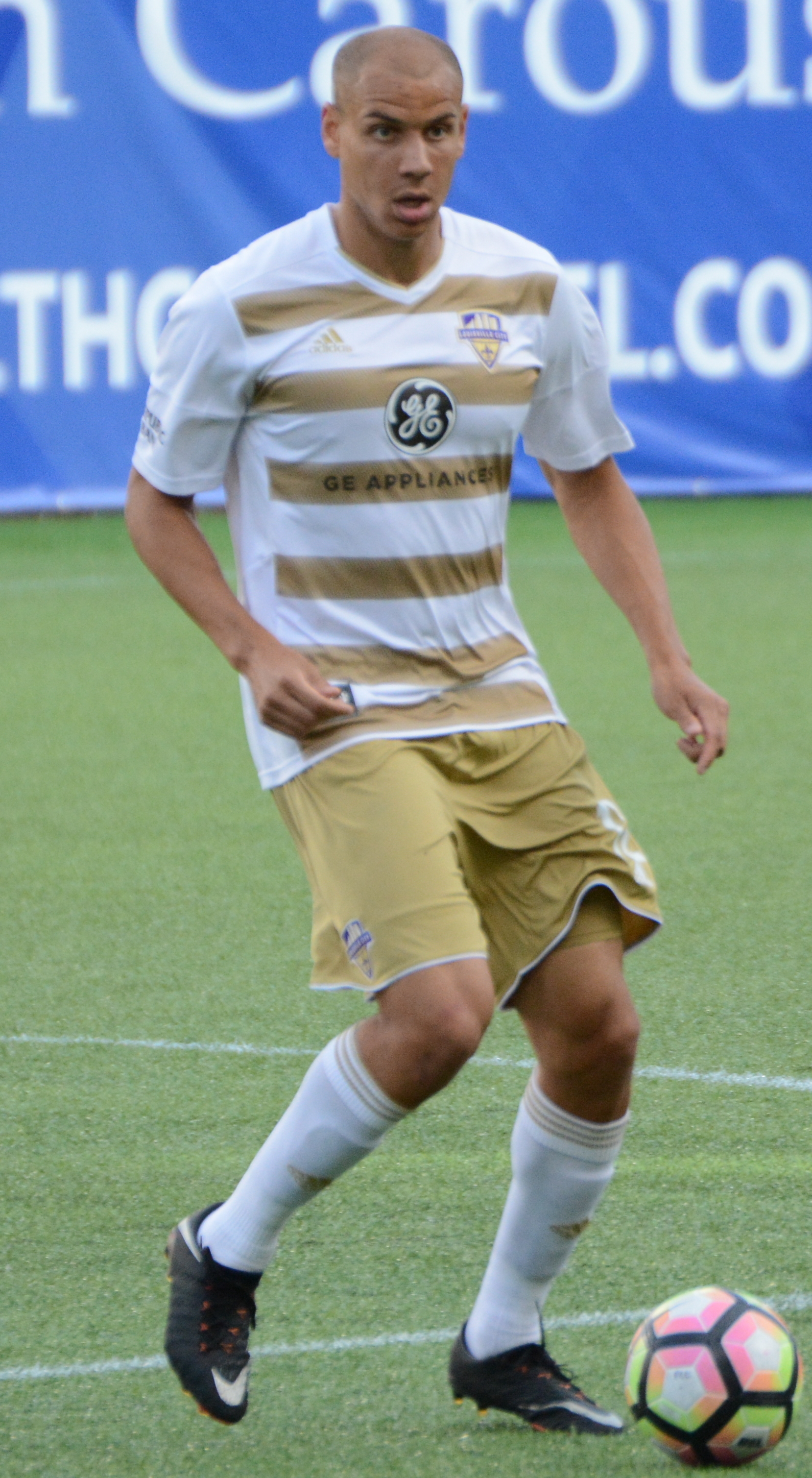
- Spencer playing for Louisville City in 2017

Personal information
- Date of birth: November 28, 1990 (age 35)
- Place of birth: Augsburg, Germany
- Height: 1.88 m (6 ft 2 in)
- Position: Forward

College career
Years	Team	Apps	(Gls)
2009–2012	Xavier Musketeers	70	(22)

Senior career*
Years	Team	Apps	(Gls)
2012	Cincinnati Kings	11	(2)
2016	FC Cincinnati	11	(0)
2017–2020	Louisville City	89	(23)

Managerial career
- 2015: Xavier Musketeers (assistant)
- 2018: Louisville City (joint interim)
- 2024: FC Tulsa (assistant)
- 2024–: FC Tulsa
- * Club domestic league appearances and goals as of November 13, 2024

Luke Spencer (born November 28, 1990) is an American soccer coach and former player. He is currently the head coach for FC Tulsa in the USL Championship.

== Early life ==
=== Personal ===
Spencer was born in Augsburg, Germany to Willie and Amy Spencer and has one brother and two sisters. When he was 15 years old his mother died and he turned to soccer as an outlet for dealing with grief. He played academy soccer for Cincinnati United Premier and attended high school at Winton Woods High School. While at Winton Woods he played soccer for four years. He was named the Team MVP during his final three years and was named to both the All-League and All-city first teams as a senior. He left Winton Woods scoring 24 goals with thirteen assists.

=== College and youth ===
Spencer played four years of college soccer at Xavier University between 2009 and 2012. As a Freshman Spencer became a starter, scored three goals, and be named to the Atlantic 10 All Freshman team. As a Sophomore he became Xavier's primary striker and despite missing the first eight games of the season would lead the team with 14 points. Spencer was named to the NSCAA All-Mid-Atlantic Second Team as a Sophomore and was given the honor again as a Junior. Spencer again led the team as a Junior with 20 points and also contributed a team high seven goals. Xavier and Spencer went on to win the Atlantic 10 Tournament that year with Spencer being named to the Atlantic 10 All-Tournament team as well as the All Atlantic 10 Second Team. As a Senior again led the team in points and goals with 36 and 14 respectively. Xavier and Spencer would repeat as Atlantic 10 Tournament champions with Spencer being named to the Atlantic 10 All-Tournament team, the All Atlantic 10 First Team, and NSCAA All-Mid-Atlantic First Team. He left Xavier having appeared in 70 matches with 29 goals and 21 assists.

While at college, Spencer played for Premier Development League side Cincinnati Kings during their 2012 season scoring two goals in eleven appearances.

== Club career ==
=== New England Revolution ===
Spencer left Xavier before graduating and was selected 23rd overall in the 2013 MLS SuperDraft by the New England Revolution; becoming the first Xavier soccer player to be taken in the draft. Four days into training camp with New England he tore the ACL in his right knee and subsequently was not signed by New England. Seven months later he attempted to return to New England but was again sidelined when he tore his meniscus. This would require multiple surgeries.

=== FC Cincinnati ===
On February 15, 2016, Spencer signed his first professional contract with United Soccer League expansion side FC Cincinnati and made his professional debut on March 27 against Charleston. He played in 11 of Cincinnati's 30 league matches and 1 of their 2 U.S. Open Cup matches going goalless in all competitions.

=== Louisville City FC ===
After seeing little playing time in Cincinnati, Spencer went on trial with USL side Louisville City FC and signed with them on February 9, 2017. He made his season debut on March 25 against Saint Louis FC and went on to appear in 26 of Louisville's 32 league matches. He led the team in league play in both goals and points with 10 and 23 respectively and along with Cameron Lancaster was one of only two Louisville players with double digit goals across all competitions. He also appeared in one of Louisville's two U.S. Open Cup matches as well as all four of Louisville's USL Cup matches, scoring one goal. Spencer and Louisville went on to win the USL Cup Final against Swope Park

In 2018, Spencer had his contract renewed with Louisville and he made his season debut on March 17 against USL expansion side Nashville SC where he scored the first goal of Louisville's season. In early June he had surgery on his right knee which caused him to miss significant time. He only appeared in 19 of Louisville's 34 league matches primarily as a substitute while scoring five goals. He also appeared in three of Louisville's five U.S. Open Cup matches scoring one goal as Louisville reached the quarter-finals of the competition for the first time in its history. This included a 3–2 victory over the New England Revolution of MLS; Louisville's first victory over an MLS side. Spencer also appeared in all four of Louisville's USL Cup playoff matches. Starting both the Eastern Conference Final and USL Cup Final matches in place of the injured Cameron Lancaster. He scored two goals in the playoffs including the sole goal of the USL Cup final match as Spencer and Louisville went on to win the USL Cup Final against Phoenix. Where he was named USL Final MVP Spencer along with fellow forwards Cameron Lancaster and Ilija Ilić were the only Louisville players to score a goal in all competitions.

On October 29, 2020, Spencer announced his retirement from playing professional soccer. Spencer moved to the new role of Louisville's youth academy assistant boys director and college recruitment coordinator.

== Managerial career ==
=== Xavier University ===
Spencer joined Xavier's coaching staff as Director of Soccer Operations for the 2015 season.

=== Louisville City FC ===
On July 1, 2018, was Spencer appointed Joint Interim Manager of Louisville City FC as a player-manager along with teammates George Davis IV and Paolo DelPiccolo following the departure of James O'Connor for Orlando City SC. He made his managerial debut on July 7 against Tampa Bay and amassed a 4–2–1 record before being replaced by John Hackworth. His last match as manager was on August 10 against New York Red Bulls II after which he returned to his player duties. Spencer was named director of Louisville City's Boys Academy in December 2020.

=== FC Tulsa ===
In January 2024, Spencer followed long-time Louisville Academy director Mario Sanchez to FC Tulsa of the USL Championship, where Spencer will work on the professional team's staff under Sanchez.

In November 2024, it was announced that Mario Sanchez would operate exclusively as Tulsa's technical director and Spencer would be promoted to head coach. Spencer's first season at the helm saw Tulsa win their first USL Western Conference title.

== Honors ==
=== Club ===
Louisville City FC

- USL Cup (2): 2017, 2018

=== Manager ===
FC Tulsa

- USL Western Conference Championship: 2025

=== Individual ===
- USL Cup Final MVP: 2018
