= Cameron Lancaster =

English footballer (born 1992)

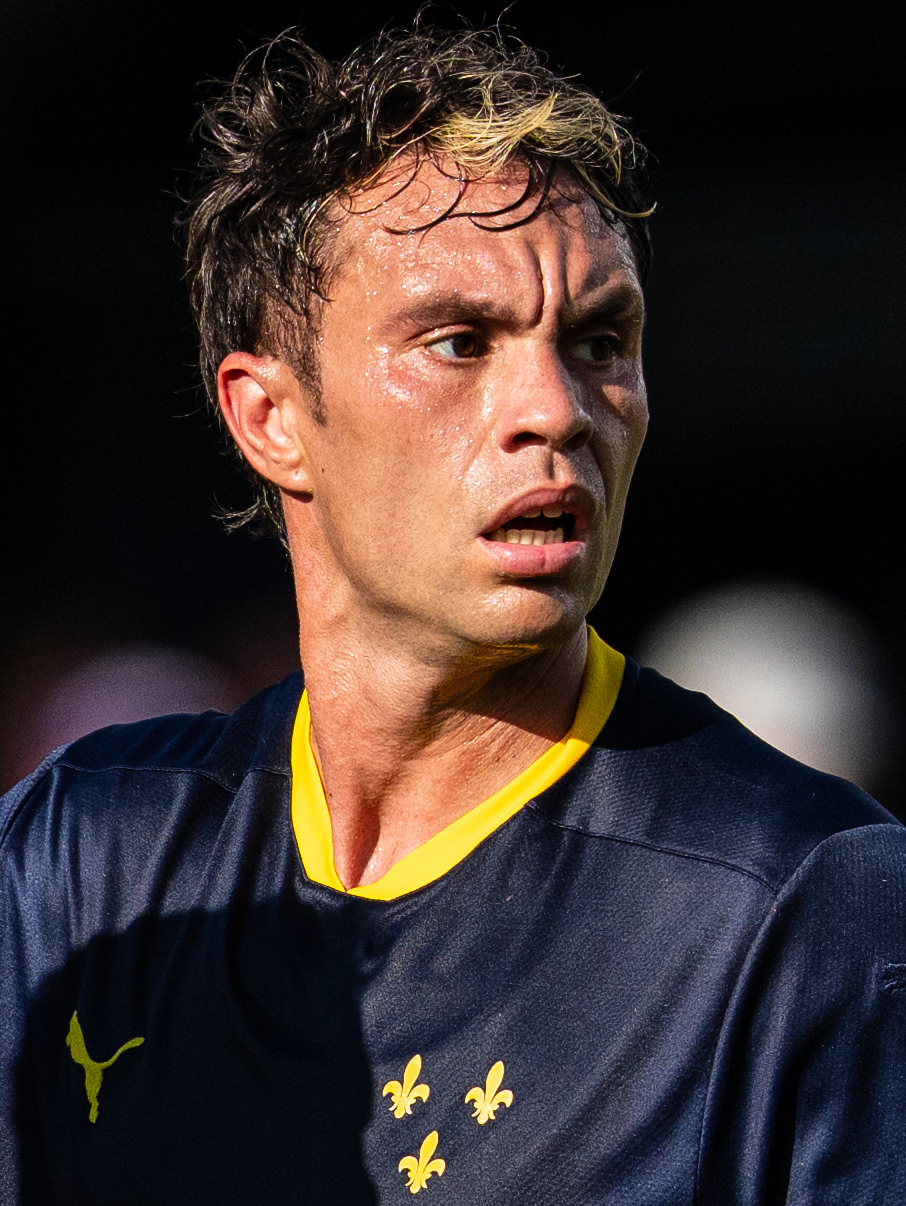
- Lancaster playing for Louisville City in 2025

Personal information
- Full name: Cameron Paul Lancaster
- Date of birth: 5 November 1992 (age 34)
- Place of birth: Camden, London, England
- Height: 6 ft 0 in (1.83 m)
- Position: Forward

Team information
- Current team: Lexington SC

Youth career
- 2009–2010: Tottenham Hotspur

Senior career*
Years	Team	Apps	(Gls)
2010–2014	Tottenham Hotspur	1	(0)
2011	→ Dagenham & Redbridge (loan)	4	(0)
2014	Stevenage	5	(1)
2014–2015	St Albans City	6	(1)
2015–2018	Louisville City	79	(36)
2019–2020	Nashville SC	18	(5)
2020	→ Louisville City (loan)	16	(10)
2021–2023	Louisville City	53	(29)
2024–	Lexington SC	21	(8)
2025	→ Louisville City (loan)	10	(1)
- * Club domestic league appearances and goals as of 20:32, 26 October 2025 (UTC)

Cameron Paul Lancaster (born 5 November 1992) is an English professional footballer who plays as a forward for USL Championship club Lexington SC.

== Early life ==
Lancaster was born in Camden and raised in Muswell Hill. He attended East Barnet School. He played for Oakhill Tigers in the Watford Friendly League as a boy.

== Football career ==
=== Tottenham Hotspur ===
Lancaster joined Tottenham Hotspur's Academy in the 2009–10 season.

He joined League One club, Dagenham & Redbridge on loan for a month on 22 March 2011. Lancaster made his debut for Dagenham on 26 March, in the 1–1 home draw with Sheffield Wednesday when he came on as a substitute for Bas Savage in the 63rd minute. Lancaster then had his loan spell with the club extended until the end of the season. After his loan spell with Daggers came to an end, Lancaster was given his first professional contract with the club.

Lancaster made his only appearance for Tottenham in a Premier League match against Wigan Athletic on 31 January 2012, coming on as a substitute in the 78th minute for Emmanuel Adebayor. Six months later, Lancaster signed a two-year contract with the club, keeping him until 2014. At the end of the 2013–14 season, Lancaster was released by the club upon expiry of his contract.

=== Stevenage and St Albans City ===
After being released by Tottenham Hotspur, Lancaster joined Stevenage. This came after Lancaster made an impression as a trialist at the club. Lancaster made his Stevenage debut the same day, in a 3–2 win over AFC Wimbledon. After making six appearances, Lancaster left the club by December.

Lancaster joined St Albans City on 5 December 2014. Lancaster scored on his debut two days later, in a 3–1 defeat over Hemel Hempstead Town. After one month at the club, Lancaster left St Albans City, with a hinted move to America.

=== Louisville City ===
==== 2015 season ====
Lancaster emigrated to the US and on 26 March signed with USL expansion side Louisville City FC; joining his compatriot teammate, Charlie Adams. He made his Louisville debut on 4 April against as a substitute in a 1–1 draw Richmond. Later in April during a team practice he tore his ACL for the second time in his career which required surgery. Ending his season.

==== 2016 season ====
Lancaster remained with Louisville and made his season debut in Louisville's opening match on 26 March against Richmond where he scored the match's only goal. He went on play in 26 of Louisville's regular season matches scoring four goals with three assists while becoming the team's primary striker towards the end of the season. He also played in one of Louisville's two US Open Cup matches as well as all three of Louisville's USL Cup playoff matches. He went goalless in both competitions and missed the first shot of the Penalty shoot-out in the Eastern Conference final against New York Red Bulls II. A match that Louisville would go on to lose.

==== 2017 season ====
Lancaster re-signed with Louisville and made his season debut in Louisville's opening match on 25 March; a scoreless draw against Saint Louis. For the second consecutive year he scored the team's first goal of the league season in a 1–3 victory over Orlando City B. Although slowed by a fractured toe late in the year, he was Louisville's second leading goal scorer in league competition with seven goals in 21 matches played. He also appeared in one of Louisville's two U.S. Open Cup matches scoring two goals in the team's opening match against Tartan Devils Oak Avalon. In the USL Cup playoffs, Lancaster appeared in three of Louisville's four matches and scored the only goal in the final as he and Louisville defeated the Swope Park Rangers to win the USL Cup. He finished the season as the only player to score a goal in all three of Louisville's competitions and along with Luke Spencer the only Louisville player to score at least ten goals.

==== 2018 season ====
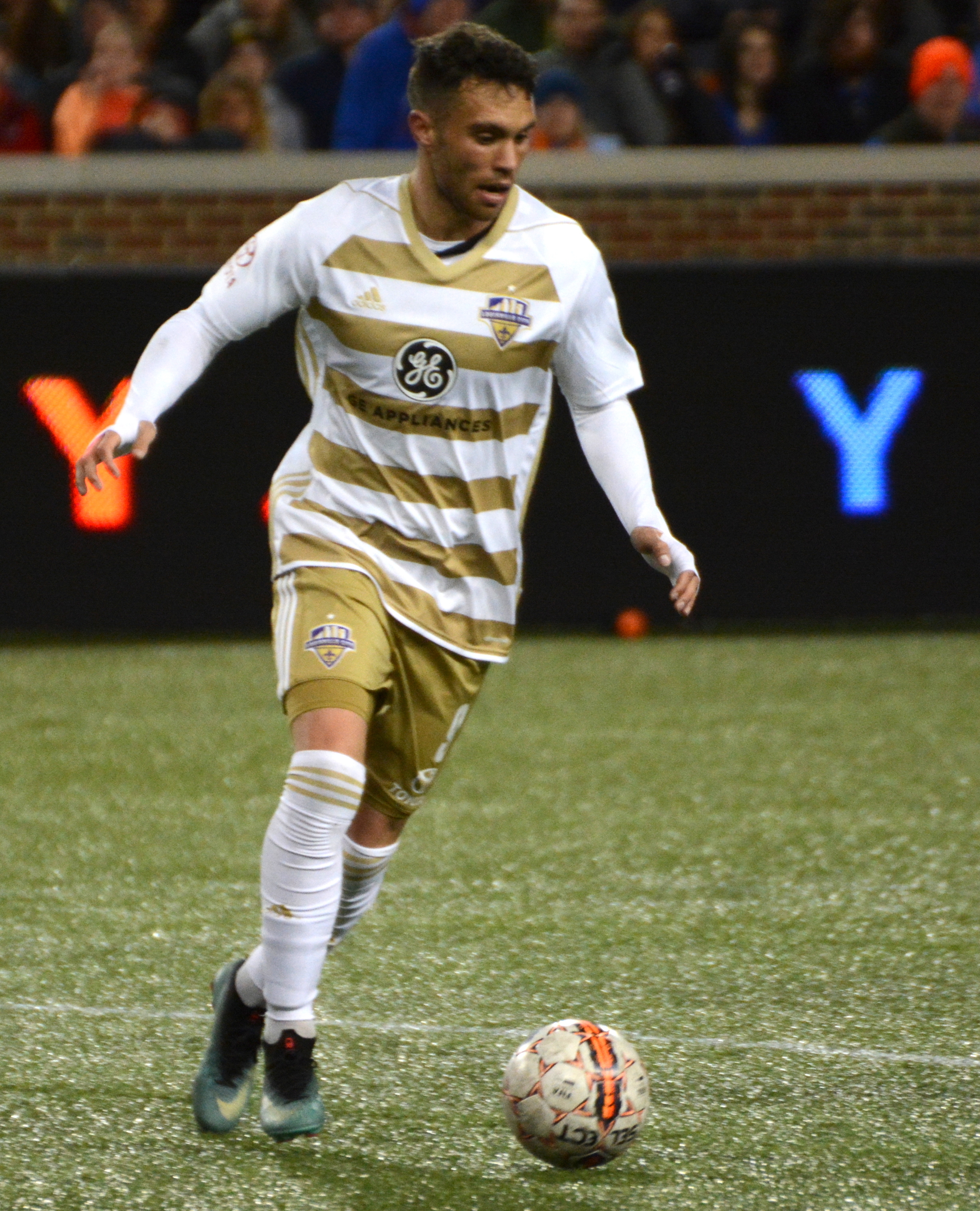
Lancaster in 2018

Lancaster remained with Louisville and made his season debut against rival FC Cincinnati on 7 April, when he scored the game's only goal. Although slowed by injury during the season he still appeared in 30 of Louisville's 34 league matches and lead both Louisville and the league with 25 goals; a USL single season record. This included scoring his first Hat-trick as a professional on 8 October against New York Red Bulls II. He also appeared in four of Louisville's five U.S. Open Cup matches as Louisville reached the quarter finals of the competition for the first time in its history. This included a 3–2 victory over the New England Revolution of MLS; Louisville's first victory over an MLS side. He along with Brian Ownby lead the team with two goals scored in the competition including a goal against New England. Lancaster also appeared in three of Louisville's four USL Cup playoff matches scoring one goal. During the Eastern Conference Final match against New York Red Bulls II he was injured and was unable to play in the USL Cup final against Phoenix (a match that Louisville went on to win). Lancaster finished the season winning the USL Golden Boot and being named to the USL All League First Team. He along with Ilija Ilić were the only Louisville players to score at least ten goals in league play while he, Ilić, and Luke Spencer were the only Louisville players to score a goal in all competitions.

=== Nashville ===
On 20 December 2018, Lancaster was announced as the second signing of Nashville MLS, who will begin play in 2020. He will spend the 2019 season on loan with Nashville SC of the USL Championship.

=== Return to Louisville City ===
On 6 February 2020 Louisville City announced that Lancaster would be returning to play in the 2020 season on loan from Nashville SC. In November 2020, it was announced that Lancaster had rejoined Louisville City on a permanent deal. On June 22, 2021, Lancaster was named USL Championship Player of the Week for Week 9 of the 2021 season after scoring three goals in games against Birmingham Legion FC and FC Tulsa. He became a free agent following Louisville's 2023 season.

=== Lexington SC ===
Lancaster signed with Lexington SC of USL League One on January 22, 2024.

=== Loan to Louisville City ===
Lancaster again joined Louisville City on a loan deal from Lexington on May 27, 2025.

== Honours ==
=== Club ===
Louisville City FC

- USL Cup (2): 2017, 2018

=== Individual ===
- USL Championship Golden Boot: 2018
- USL Championship All League First Team (2): 2018, 2020
- USL Championship All League Second Team: 2021
- USL Championship Player of the Month (3): April 2018, August 2018, October 2018
