= Ilija Ilić =

Serbian footballer

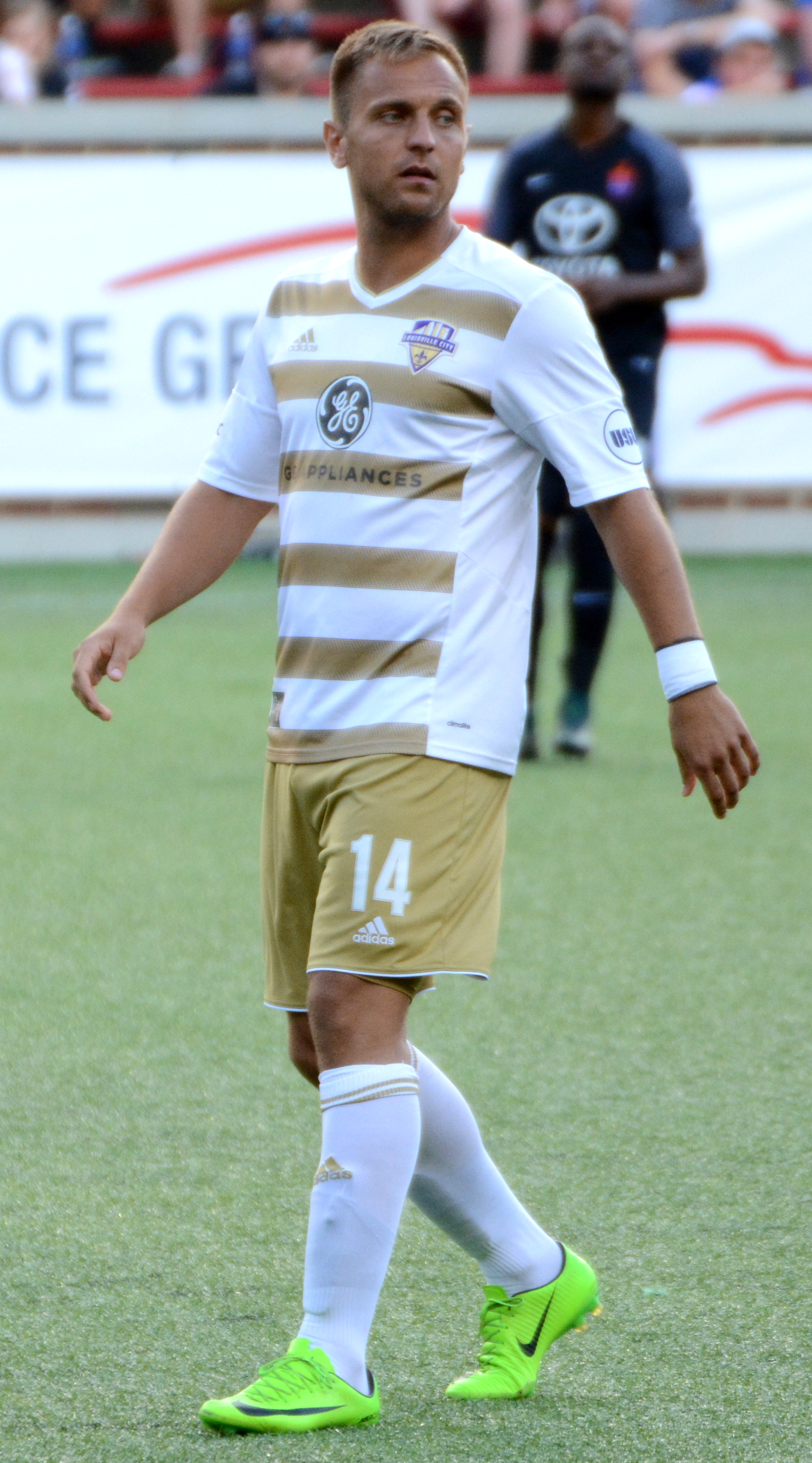
- Ilić playing for Louisville City FC in 2017

Personal information
- Date of birth: 26 April 1991 (age 35)
- Place of birth: Belgrade, SFR Yugoslavia
- Height: 1.88 m (6 ft 2 in)
- Position: Forward

Youth career
- 2006–2008: Čukarički
- 2008–2011: Red Star Belgrade
- 2009–2010: → FK Sopot (loan)

College career
Years	Team	Apps	(Gls)
2011–2014	Young Harris Mountain Lions	72	(64)

Senior career*
Years	Team	Apps	(Gls)
2014	Ocala Stampede	11	(7)
2015–2018	Louisville City	72	(17)
2019–2020	Indy Eleven	28	(2)
2021–2022	New Mexico United	24	(3)
2023	One Knoxville	21	(4)

Managerial career
- 2023–: One Knoxville (assistant)
- * Club domestic league appearances and goals as of October 18, 2023

Ilija Ilić (born 26 April 1991) is a Serbian retired professional footballer who played as a forward. He is currently an assistant coach for USL League One club One Knoxville SC.

== Career ==
Ilić began his career with the youth clubs of FK Čukarički and Red Star Belgrade, as well as a loan spell with FK Sopot during their 2010 and 2011 season.

Ilić played college soccer in the United States with Young Harris College between 2011 and 2014. While at college, he also spent time with USL PDL club Ocala Stampede.

After leaving college, he signed with USL club Louisville City on March 26, 2015.

Ilić signed for USL Championship side Indy Eleven on 3 December 2018.

On 14 December 2020 he moved to USL Championship side New Mexico United ahead of their 2021 season. He was released by New Mexico in July 2022.

On December 12, 2022, Ilić signed with USL League One club One Knoxville SC. He was the newly promoted club's first major signing announcement, and will also serve as assistant coach.

== Career statistics ==
As of match played April 23, 2022

Club	Season	League			Domestic Cup		League Cup		Total	
Club	Season	Division	Apps	Goals	Apps	Goals	Apps	Goals	Apps	Goals
Ocala Stampede	2014	USL PDL	11	7	1 (Note: Appearance(s) in US Open Cup)	0	2 (Note: Appearance(s) in PDL playoffs)	1	14	8
Louisville City FC	2015	USL	19	1	1	0	2 (Note: Appearance(s) in USL playoffs)	0	22	1
Louisville City FC	2016	USL	12	2	1	1	2	0	15	3
Louisville City FC	2017	USL	13	3	2	1	4	0	19	4
Louisville City FC	2018	USL	28	11	3	1	4	2	35	14
Louisville City FC	Total		72	17	7	3	12	2	91	22
Indy Eleven	2019	USL Championship	15	2	0	0	3	0	18	2
Indy Eleven	2020	USL Championship	13	0	—		—		13	0
Indy Eleven	Total		28	2	—		—		31	2
New Mexico United	2021	USL Championship	22	3	—		—		22	3
New Mexico United	2022	USL Championship	2	0	1	0	—		3	0
New Mexico United	Total		24	3	1	0	0	0	25	3
Career total			133	29	8	3	17	3	158	35

== Honors ==
=== Club ===
Louisville City FC

- USL Cup (2): 2017, 2018
