= 2018 Nashville SC season =

Nashville SC
2018 season
- General manager: Christopher Jones
- Head coach: Gary Smith
- Stadium: First Tennessee Park
- United Soccer League: Eastern Conference: 7th
- U.S. Open Cup: Round of 16
- Top goalscorer: League: Lebo Moloto (5); All: Lebo Moloto, Ropapa Mensah, Brandon Allen, Tucker Hume (5)
- Highest home attendance: 18,922 (Mar 24 vs. Pittsburgh, at Nissan Stadium)
- Lowest home attendance: 7,487 (Apr 7 vs. Charlotte)
- Average home league attendance: 13,205
Home colors	Away colors

The 2018 Nashville SC season was the club's inaugural season both as an organization and as a member in the United Soccer League (USL). Nashville SC played in the Eastern Conference of the USL.

== Club ==
=== Technical Staff ===
Technical Staff
Position	Staff
Head Coach	(England) Gary Smith
Technical Director	(United States) Mike Jacobs
Assistant Coach	(England) David Proctor
Team Administrator & Equipment Manager	(United States) Jeff Robben

=== Roster ===
As of July 12, 2018

No.	Position	Nation	Player
1	GK	USA	Micah Bledsoe
2	DF	USA	Justin Davis
3	FW	GHA	Ropapa Mensah (on loan from Inter Allies)
4	MF	JAM	Ramone Howell (on loan to Inter Nashville FC)
5	DF	Isle of Man	Liam Doyle
6	MF	USA	Josh Hughes
7	MF	CAN	Ryan James
8	FW	NIR	Robin Shroot
9	FW	CAN	Michael Cox (traded to Saint Louis FC)
10	MF	RSA	Lebo Moloto
11	MF	GAM	Ismaila Jome
12	FW	USA	Tucker Hume
13	MF	USA	Ian McGrath (on loan to Inter Nashville FC)
14	DF	CAN	Jordan Dunstan (on loan to Inter Nashville FC)
15	DF	USA	Michael DeGraffenreidt (on loan to Inter Nashville FC)
16	MF	POR	Martim Galvão
17	MF	USA	Michael Reed (captain)
18	GK	USA	Matt Pickens
19	FW	USA	Alan Winn
20	MF	USA	Matt LaGrassa
21	GK	USA	C. J. Cochran (on loan to Fresno FC)
22	DF	USA	Bradley Bourgeois
23	DF	USA	Taylor Washington
27	DF	JPN	Kosuke Kimura
28	DF	USA	London Woodberry
30	MF	NGR	Bolu Akinyode
32	FW	USA	Brandon Allen

== Competitions ==
Win Draw Loss

=== Friendlies ===
February 10	Nashville SC	1–3	Atlanta United FC	Nashville, Tennessee
3:00 p.m. CST	Mensah 65'	Report	Martínez 58'; Vazquez 75'; Nagbe 78'	Stadium: First Tennessee Park; Attendance: 9,059

February 21	Chicago Fire	0–0	Nashville SC	Bradenton, Florida
	Dean (yellow card) 39'		Cox (yellow card) 50'	Stadium: IMG Academy

February 23	Ottawa Fury	1–1	Nashville SC	Bradenton, Florida
	Haworth 4'	Report	Winn 2' (pen.)	Stadium: IMG Academy

February 25	Orlando City SC	0–3	Nashville SC	Sanford, Florida
		Report	Moloto; Winn; Cox	Stadium: Sylvan Lakes Park; Attendance: Closed-door
Note: Result not publicized.

March 1	Lipscomb Bisons	0–2	Nashville SC	Nashville, Tennessee
			McGrath 50'; Galvão 75'	Stadium: Lipscomb University

March 3	FC Cincinnati	2–2	Nashville SC	Cincinnati, Ohio
	Laing 45'; Welshman 65'; Seymore (yellow card) 82'	Report	LaGrassa 21'; Winn 87' (pen.)	Stadium: Nippert Stadium

March 10	Chattanooga FC	1–3	Nashville SC	Chattanooga, Tennessee
	Hernandez 59'; Valeciano (yellow card)	Report	LaGrassa 18' (pen.); Mensah 30'; Hume 45'; James (yellow card)	Stadium: Finley Stadium; Attendance: 3,239

=== USL ===
==== Standings ====
Pos	Team	Pld	W	D	L	GF	GA	GD	Pts	Qualification
6	Bethlehem Steel FC	34	14	8	12	56	41	+15	50	Conference Playoffs
7	Indy Eleven	34	13	10	11	45	42	+3	49	Conference Playoffs
8	Nashville SC	34	12	13	9	42	31	+11	49	Conference Playoffs
9	North Carolina FC	34	13	8	13	60	50	+10	47	
10	Ottawa Fury	34	13	6	15	31	43	−12	45	

Source: 2018 USL standings
Rules for classification: 1) total wins; 2) total goal differential; 3) total goals scored; 4) points earned against top four Conference finishers; 5) disciplinary points; 6) coin toss or drawing of lots

==== Results summary ====
Source: Match reports

Round	1	2	3	4	5	6	7	8	9	10	11	12	13	14	15	16	17	18	19	20	21	22	23	24	25	26	27	28	29	30	31	32	33	34
Stadium	A	H	A	H	A	A	A	H	A	A	H	A	H	H	H	H	A	A	H	H	H	H	H	A	H	H	A	H	A	A	A	A	H	H
Result	L	D	W	W	L	D	D	W	D	W	W	D	W	L	W	D	L	L	W	L	D	W	D	L	W	L	D	L	D	W	D	W	D	D

Source: Results Table
A = Away; H = Home; W = Win; D = Draw; L = Loss

==== Results Table ====
March 17 1	Louisville City FC	2–0	Nashville SC	Louisville, Kentucky
2:00 p.m. CDT	Spencer 56', (yellow card) 81'; McCabe 66'	Report	LaGrassa (yellow card) 79'	Stadium: Louisville Slugger Field; Attendance: 7,933; Referee: Ismir Pekmic

March 24 2	Nashville SC	0–0	Pittsburgh Riverhounds	Nashville, Tennessee
5:00 p.m. CDT	Moloto (yellow card) 52'; Mensah (yellow card) 68'	Report	Vancaeyezeele (yellow card) 18'	Stadium: Nissan Stadium; Attendance: 18,922; Referee: Leland Grant

March 31 3	Bethlehem Steel FC	0–1	Nashville SC	Bethlehem, Pennsylvania
1:00 p.m. CDT	Aubrey (red card) 5'; Chambers (yellow card) 59'	Report	Cox 6' (pen.); Davis (yellow card) 79'	Stadium: Goodman Stadium; Attendance: 2,220; Referee: Brandon Smith

April 7 4	Nashville SC	2–0	Charlotte Independence	Nashville, Tennessee
7:30 p.m. CDT	Winn 24'; Mensah 90+1'	NSH Report; USL Report; Report	Duckett (yellow card) 12'; Johnson (yellow card) 89'	Stadium: First Tennessee Park; Attendance: 7,487; Referee: Elvis Osmanovic

April 14 5	Indy Eleven	2–1	Nashville SC	Indianapolis, Indiana
11:00 a.m. CDT	Saad 15', 34'; Ayoze (yellow card) 70'	Report	Akinyode (yellow card) 26'; Doyle (yellow card) 37'; Mensah 45'	Stadium: Lucas Oil Stadium; Attendance: 10,188; Referee: Rosendo Mendoza

April 24 6	Penn FC	0–0	Nashville SC	Harrisburg, Pennsylvania
5:30 p.m. CDT	Heinemann (yellow card) 28'; Baffoe (yellow card) 75'	Report	Shroot (yellow card) 21'; Bourgeois (yellow card) 28'; Moloto (yellow card) 43'; Mensah (yellow card) 51'; Washington (yellow card) 64'	Stadium: FNB Field; Attendance: 1,012; Referee: Lorant Varga

May 6 7	New York Red Bulls II	1–1	Nashville SC	Harrison, New Jersey
12:00 p.m. CDT	Bezecourt 27'	USL Report	Mensah 7'	Stadium: Red Bull Arena; Attendance: 652

May 13 8	Nashville SC	2–0	Louisville City FC	Nashville, Tennessee
5:00 p.m. CDT	Moloto 39', 84'	USL Report		Stadium: First Tennessee Park; Attendance: 8,610

May 26 9	Charleston Battery	1–1	Nashville SC	Charleston, South Carolina
6:00 p.m. CDT	Guerra 50'	USL Report	Doyle 25'	Stadium: MUSC Health Stadium; Attendance: 2,697

May 30 10	Pittsburgh Riverhounds	0–1	Nashville SC	Pittsburgh, Pennsylvania
6:00 p.m. CDT		USL Report	Allen 69'	Stadium: Highmark Stadium; Attendance: 967

June 2 11	Nashville SC	3–1	Penn FC	Nashville, Tennessee
7:30 p.m. CDT	Allen 36'; Moloto 48'; Winn 81'		Tribbett 76'	Stadium: First Tennessee Park; Attendance: 8,724

June 9 12	Tampa Bay Rowdies	1–1	Nashville SC	St. Petersburg, Florida
6:30 p.m. CDT	Taylor 84'		Moloto 22'	Stadium: Al Lang Stadium

June 16 13	Nashville SC	1–0	North Carolina FC	Nashville, Tennessee
7:30 p.m. CDT	Mensah 90+4'	Report		Stadium: First Tennessee Park; Attendance: 9,047; Referee: Lukasz Szpala

June 26 14	Nashville SC	0–2	Indy Eleven	Nashville, Tennessee
7:30 p.m. CDT		Report	Ouimette 16'; Braun 35'	Stadium: First Tennessee Park; Attendance: 8,482; Referee: Ismir Pekmic

June 30 15	Nashville SC	3–0	Atlanta United 2	Nashville, Tennessee
7:30 p.m. CDT	Allen 19'; Winn 45+3'; Moloto 84'	Report		Stadium: First Tennessee Park; Attendance: 8,815; Referee: Luis Guardia

July 7 16	Nashville SC	0–0	FC Cincinnati	Nashville, Tennessee
7:30 p.m. CDT	Moloto (yellow card) 15'	Report	Keinan (yellow card) 17'	Stadium: Nissan Stadium; Attendance: 18,228; Referee: Lorant Varga

July 11 17	Charlotte Independence	1–0	Nashville SC	Matthews, North Carolina
6:30 p.m. CDT	George 42'; Calvert (red card) 90+4'	Report		Stadium: Sportsplex at Matthews; Attendance: 1,247; Referee: Kevin Broadley

July 21 18	Ottawa Fury	2–0	Nashville SC	Ottawa, Ontario
6:00 p.m. CDT	Taylor 90+1'; Oliveira 90+6'	Report		Stadium: TD Place Stadium; Attendance: 4,267; Referee: Juan Márquez

July 25 19	Nashville SC	1–0	Atlanta United 2	Nashville, Tennessee
7:30 p.m. CDT	Washington 80'	Report		Stadium: First Tennessee Park; Attendance: 8,729; Referee: Guido Gonzales, Jr.

July 28 20	Toronto FC II	2–0	Nashville SC	Toronto, Ontario
7:00 p.m. CDT	Uccello 34' (pen.); Srbely 47'	Report		Stadium: BMO Training Ground; Attendance: 2,277; Referee: Ernie Constantine

August 4 21	FC Cincinnati	1–1	Nashville SC	Cincinnati, Ohio
6:30 p.m. CDT	Konig 1'	Report	Hume 85'	Stadium: Nippert Stadium; Attendance: 27,426; Referee: Ismir Pekmic

August 10 22	Nashville SC	2–0	Ottawa Fury	Nashville, Tennessee
7:30 p.m. CDT	LaGrassa 31', (yellow card) 65'; Allen 59' (pen.)	Report		Stadium: First Tennessee Park; Attendance: 8,694; Referee: Elvis Osmanovic

August 18 23	Louisville City FC	0–0	Nashville SC	Louisville, Kentucky
6:30 p.m. CDT	Totsch (yellow card) 68'; Francis (yellow card) 90+4'	Report	Mensah (yellow card) 84'	Stadium: Louisville Slugger Field; Attendance: 9,684; Referee: Ramy Touchan

August 25 24	Nashville SC	1–2	Bethlehem Steel FC	Nashville, Tennessee
7:30 p.m. CDT	Jome (yellow card) 27', (yellow card) 31' (red card); Davis 84'	Report	Nanco 23'; Mbaizo (yellow card) 45'; Najem 90+3'	Stadium: First Tennessee Park; Attendance: 8,856; Referee: Leland Grant

August 28 25	Nashville SC	4–0	Richmond Kickers	Nashville, Tennessee
7:30 p.m. CDT	Hume 42', 60'; Bourgeois 48'; Davis (yellow card) 55'; LaGrassa 57'	Report		Stadium: First Tennessee Park; Attendance: 8,651; Referee: Marcos de Oliveira

September 1 26	Charlotte Independence	1–0	Nashville SC	Matthews, North Carolina
6:30 p.m. CDT	Watson 25'; George (yellow card) 53', (yellow card) 86' (red card); Jung-soo (yellow card) 81'	Report	Winn (yellow card) 45'; Moloto (yellow card) 53'; Woodberry (yellow card) 67'	Stadium: Sportsplex at Matthews; Attendance: 1,317; Referee: Rosendo Mendoza

September 8 27	North Carolina FC	3–3	Nashville SC	Cary, North Carolina
6:00 p.m. CDT	Shipalane 18'; Ríos 39'; Steinberger 63'	Report	Allen 51' (pen.), 80' (pen.); Kimura (yellow card) 67'; Moloto 82'	Stadium: WakeMed Soccer Park; Attendance: 9,505; Referee: Guido Gonzalez Jr.

September 18 28	Nashville SC	1–2	Tampa Bay Rowdies	Nashville, Tennessee
7:30 p.m. CDT	Moloto 20'	Report	Hristov 6' (pen.); Morad (yellow card) 46'; Woodberry 69' (o.g.); GGuenzatti (yellow card) 90+7'	Stadium: First Tennessee Park; Attendance: 7,269; Referee: Malik Badawi

September 22 29	Nashville SC	1–1	Charleston Battery	Nashville, Tennessee
7:30 p.m. CDT	Hume 9'; Reed (yellow card) 45+2'	Report	Anunga 24'; Okonkwo (red card) 60'; Mansaray (yellow card) 63'	Stadium: First Tennessee Park; Attendance: 7,376; Referee: Farhad Dadkho

September 26 30	Atlanta United 2	0–2	Nashville SC	Lawrenceville, Georgia
6:00 p.m. CDT		Report	Mensah 7', (yellow card) 50'; Hume 64'	Stadium: Coolray Field; Attendance: 1,585; Referee: Elton Garcia

September 29 31	Nashville SC	1–1	New York Red Bulls II	Nashville, Tennessee
7:30 p.m. CDT	Reed 26'; Akinyode (yellow card) 53'; LaGrassa (yellow card) 65'; Washington (yellow card) 69'	Report	Moreno 5'; Aguinaga (red card) 24'; Stroud (yellow card) 72'; Kutler (yellow card) 78'	Stadium: First Tennessee Park; Attendance: 8,036; Referee: Elvis Osmanovic

October 6 32	Richmond Kickers	0–3	Nashville SC	Richmond, Virginia
6:00 p.m. CDT	Boehme (yellow card) 40'; Agyemang (yellow card) 81'; Gentile (yellow card) 90'	Report	Hume 20'; Reed 29'; Winn 56'	Stadium: City Stadium; Attendance: 5,659; Referee: Matthew Franz

October 9 33	Nashville SC	2–2	Toronto FC II	Nashville, Tennessee
7:30 p.m. CDT	LaGrassa 63'; Allen 72'; Davis (yellow card) 90+5'	Report	Srbely (yellow card) 34'; Perruzza 75'; Hamilton 85'; Patterson-Sewell (yellow card) 90+1'	Stadium: First Tennessee Park; Attendance: 7,531; Referee: Kevin Broadley

October 13 34	Nashville SC	3–3	FC Cincinnati	Nashville, Tennessee
1:00 p.m. CDT	Hume 5'; LaGrassa (yellow card) 40'; Allen 80'; Akinyode 90'	Report	Albadawi (yellow card) 39', (goal) 63'; Bone 52', 81'	Stadium: First Tennessee Park; Attendance: 9,083; Referee: Marcos DeOliveira

==== Postseason ====
October 20 Quarterfinal	FC Cincinnati	1–1 (a.e.t.) (6–5 p)	Nashville SC	Cincinnati, Ohio
4:00 EDT	Bone 95'; Smith (yellow card) 104'; Ledesma (yellow card) 111'	Report	Davis (yellow card) 110'; Bourgeois 115'; Tyrpak (yellow card) 116'	Stadium: Nippert Stadium; Attendance: 20,217; Referee: Farhad Dadkho
	Penalties
	Adi (penalty scored); McLaughlin (penalty scored); Smith (penalty scored); Hoyte (penalty scored); Lasso (penalty scored); Walker (penalty scored)		(penalty scored) Doyle; (penalty scored) Allen; (penalty scored) Winn; (penalty scored) LaGrassa; (penalty scored) Tyrpak; (penalty missed) Davis

=== U.S. Open Cup ===
May 16 Second round	Nashville SC	2–0	Inter Nashville FC	Nashville, Tennessee
EDT	Hume 19', 89'			Stadium: Vanderbilt Soccer/Lacrosse Complex

May 23 Third round	Nashville SC	3–1	Mississippi Brilla	Nashville, Tennessee
7:30 PM CDT	Allen 19'; Woodberry 30'; Shroot 90+1'		Matsoso 59'	Stadium: Vanderbilt Soccer/Lacrosse Complex; Attendance: 1,047

June 6 Fourth round	Nashville SC	2–0	Colorado Rapids	Nashville, Tennessee
7:30 PM CDT	Azira 39' (o.g.); Mensah 78'			Stadium: Vanderbilt Stadium; Attendance: 4,453

June 20 Round of 16	Louisville City FC	2–1	Nashville SC	Louisville, Kentucky
	Craig 24'; Del Piccolo 58'		LaGrassa 68'	Stadium: Lynn Stadium

=== Goalscorers ===
Includes all competitive matches.

As of matches played August 28, 2018

Rank	Pos.	Player	United Soccer League	US Open Cup	Total
1	MF	(South Africa) Lebo Moloto	5	0	5
1	FW	(Ghana) Ropapa Mensah	4	1	5
1	FW	(United States) Brandon Allen	4	1	5
1	FW	(United States) Tucker Hume	3	2	5
5	FW	(United States) Alan Winn	3	0	3
5	MF	(United States) Matt LaGrassa	2	1	3
7	FW	(Canada) Michael Cox	1	0	1
7	DF	(England) Liam Doyle	1	0	1
7	DF	(United States) Taylor Washington	1	0	1
7	DF	(United States) Justin Davis	1	0	1
7	DF	(United States) Bradley Bourgeois	1	0	1
7	DF	(United States) London Woodberry	0	1	1
7	FW	(Northern Ireland) Robin Shroot	0	1	1
Own Goals			0	1	1
Total			26	8	34
