= 2019 Nashville SC season =

Nashville SC
2019 season
- General manager: Christopher Jones
- Head coach: Gary Smith
- Stadium: First Tennessee Park
- USL Championship: Eastern Conference: 1st
- USL Playoffs: Conference Quarterfinals
- U.S. Open Cup: Second Round
- Highest home attendance: League/All: 13,047 (July 27 vs. Indy Eleven)
- Lowest home attendance: League/All: 5,356 (March 9 vs. Loudoun United FC)
- Average home league attendance: 6,999
- Biggest win: 5–1 (May 11 vs. Swope Park Rangers)
- Biggest defeat: 1–3 (April 20 vs. Charleston Battery)
Home colors	Away colors

The 2019 Nashville SC season was the club's second and final season both as an organization and as a member in the USL Championship. In 2018 and 2019, Nashville SC played in the Eastern Conference of the USL Championship, the second-highest level of professional soccer in the US.

== 2019 player roster ==
As of January 9, 2019

No.	Position	Nation	Player
1	GK	USA	Danny Vitiello
2	DF	USA	Justin Davis
3	FW	GHA	Ropapa Mensah
5	DF	ENG	Liam Doyle
6	DF	USA	Ken Tribbett
7	MF	JAM	Ramone Howell
8	MF	NED	Vinnie Vermeer
9	FW	ENG	Cameron Lancaster
10	MF	RSA	Lebo Moloto
11	FW	USA	Kharlton Belmar
12	FW	USA	Tucker Hume
14	FW	MEX	Daniel Ríos
17	MF	USA	Michael Reed (captain)
18	GK	USA	Matt Pickens
19	FW	USA	Alan Winn
20	MF	USA	Matt LaGrassa
21	DF	USA	Darnell King
22	DF	USA	Bradley Bourgeois
23	DF	USA	Taylor Washington
24	GK	USA	Connor Sparrow
27	DF	JPN	Kosuke Kimura
30	MF	NGR	Bolu Akinyode

On loan from Nashville MLS team for 2019 season

== Competitions ==
Win Draw Loss

=== Exhibitions ===
All times are in Central time.

February 6 Preseason	Montreal Impact	2–0	Nashville SC	Lakewood Ranch, Florida
3:00 PM	Diallo 71'; Novillo 80'	Report		Stadium: Premier Sports Complex

February 9 Preseason	Louisville City FC	1–2	Nashville SC	Bradenton, Florida
2:00 PM	Craig 45'		Hume 24'; Winn 70'	Stadium: IMG Academy

February 16 Preseason	Birmingham Legion FC	0–3	Nashville SC	Birmingham, Alabama
4:00 PM	(yellow card) 38'	Report	Lancaster 31'; Hume 60'; Davis (yellow card) 82'; Mensah 86'	Stadium: BBVA Compass Field

February 22 Preseason	Nashville SC	0–2	New York City FC	Nashville, Tennessee
7:00 PM	Akinyoda (yellow card) 36'	Report	Moralez 28' (pen.); Mitriță 40'	Stadium: First Tennessee Park; Attendance: 5,384

February 27 Preseason	Lipscomb Bisons	1–4	Nashville SC	Nashville, Tennessee
5:00 PM	Birchfield 63'	Report	Hume 2'; Moloto 9'; Lancaster 74'; Ríos 84'	Stadium: Lipscomb Soccer Complex

March 2 Preseason	Indy Eleven	0–0	Nashville SC	Evansville, Indiana
2:00 PM	Barrett (yellow card) 55'	Report		Stadium: Arad McCutchan Stadium

=== USL Championship ===
==== Standings ====
Pos	Team	Pld	W	D	L	GF	GA	GD	Pts	Qualification
1	Pittsburgh Riverhounds SC	34	19	11	4	58	30	+28	68	Conference Quarterfinals
2	Nashville SC	34	20	7	7	59	26	+33	67	Conference Quarterfinals
3	Indy Eleven	34	19	6	9	48	29	+19	63	Conference Quarterfinals
4	Louisville City FC	34	17	9	8	58	41	+17	60	Conference Quarterfinals
5	Tampa Bay Rowdies	34	16	10	8	61	33	+28	58	Conference Quarterfinals

Source: USL Championship Standings
Rules for classification: 1) total wins; 2) total goal differential; 3) total goals scored; 4) points earned against top four Conference finishers; 5) disciplinary points; 6) coin toss or drawing of lots

==== Results summary ====
Source: Match reports

Round	1	2	3	4	5	6	7	8	9	10
Stadium	H	H	A	A	H	A				
Result	W	D	L	W	W					

Updated to match(es) played on April 13, 2019. Source: Results Table
A = Away; H = Home; W = Win; D = Draw; L = Loss

==== Match results ====
On December 19, 2018, the USL announced their 2019 season schedule.
All times are in Central time.

March 9 1	Nashville SC	2–0	Loudoun United FC	Nashville, Tennessee
7:00 PM	Lancaster 58'; Ríos 61'; Moloto (yellow card) 87'	Report		Stadium: First Tennessee Park; Attendance: 5,356; Referee: Thomas Snyder

March 16 2	Nashville SC	0–1	Saint Louis FC	Nashville, Tennessee
7:00 PM	Moloto (yellow card) 32'	Report	Kavita (yellow card) 62'; Umar (yellow card) 71'; Calvert 84'	Stadium: First Tennessee Park; Attendance: 6,070; Referee: Eric Tattersall

March 24 3	New York Red Bulls II	1–1	Nashville SC	Harrison, New Jersey
12:00 PM	Rito (yellow card) 45+1'; White 55'; Scarlett (yellow card) 78'	Report; NSC Report	Vermeer (yellow card) 20'; Ríos 21'; Reed (yellow card) 75'; Doyle (yellow card) 83'	Stadium: Red Bull Arena; Attendance: 812; Referee: Jon Freemon

April 6 4	Ottawa Fury FC	0–3	Nashville SC	Ottawa, Ontario
1:00 PM	Gagnon-Laparé (yellow card) 26'; Mannella (yellow card) 90+3'	Report	Ríos 33', 80'; Hume 67'; Moloto (yellow card) 69'	Stadium: TD Place Stadium; Attendance: 6,543; Referee: Matt Souare

April 13 5	Nashville SC	2–0	Memphis 901 FC	Nashville, Tennessee
7:00 PM	LaGrassa 78'; Mensah 81'	Report	Burch (yellow card) 85'; Charpie (yellow card) 89'; Collier (yellow card) 90'	Stadium: First Tennessee Park; Attendance: 6,781; Referee: Carlos Pielago

April 20 6	Charleston Battery	3–1	Nashville SC	Charleston, South Carolina
6:30 PM	van Schaik 14', 73'; Woodbine (yellow card) 57'; Bosua 64'; Candela (yellow card) 77'	Report	Bourgeois (yellow card) 38'; Reed (yellow card) 45+3'; King (yellow card) 68'; Davis (yellow card) 83'; Ríos 89' (pen.)	Stadium: MUSC Health Stadium; Attendance: 2,776; Referee: Kevin Broadley

April 27 7	Pittsburgh Riverhounds SC	2–2	Nashville SC	Pittsburgh, Pennsylvania
6:00 PM	Volesky 88'; Kimura 90+1' (o.g.); Velarde (yellow card) 90+4'	Report	Bourgeois (yellow card) 22', (goal) 66'; Tribbett 41'; Ríos (yellow card) 74'	Stadium: Highmark Stadium; Referee: Charles Murphy

May 4 8	Atlanta United 2	0–2	Nashville SC	Kennesaw, Georgia
6:30 PM	Vint (yellow card) 18'; Conway (yellow card) 20'; Campbell (red card) 76'; Wyke (yellow card) 90+4'	Report	Vint 4' (o.g.); LaGrassa 11'; Ríos (yellow card) 59'; Bourgeois (yellow card) 67'; Akinyode (yellow card) 90+2'	Stadium: Fifth Third Bank Stadium; Attendance: 3,109; Referee: Gabriele Giusti

May 8 9	Nashville SC	0–1	Tampa Bay Rowdies	Nashville, Tennessee
7:00 PM	King (yellow card) 37'	Report	Tejada 34'; Morad (yellow card) 90'; Kone (yellow card) 90+1'	Stadium: First Tennessee Park; Attendance: 6,628; Referee: Guido Gonzales, Jr.

May 11 10	Nashville SC	5–1	Swope Park Rangers	Nashville, Tennessee
7:00 PM	Ríos 5', 14'; Winn 16'; Belmar 55'; Tribbett (yellow card) 65'; Moloto (yellow card) 79'; Lancaster 89'	Report	Mbekeli (yellow card) 42'; Hernandez 61'; Riley (yellow card) 70'	Stadium: First Tennessee Park; Attendance: 6,164; Referee: Calin Radosav

May 18 11	Nashville SC	1–1	Charlotte Independence	Nashville, Tennessee
7:00 PM	Moloto 23'; Davis (yellow card) 78'	Report	Oduro 15'; Jackson (yellow card) 90'	Stadium: First Tennessee Park; Attendance: 6,918; Referee: Gustavo Solorio

May 22 12	Birmingham Legion FC	0–1	Nashville SC	Birmingham, Alabama
7:00 PM CDT	Williams (yellow card) 58'	Report	Ríos 63' (pen.)	Stadium: BBVA Compass Field; Attendance: 5,314; Referee: Elvis Osmanovic

May 25 13	Indy Eleven	0–0	Nashville SC	Indianapolis, Indiana
6:00 PM CDT		Report	Bourgeois (yellow card) 54'; Washington (yellow card) 90+1'	Stadium: Lucas Oil Stadium; Attendance: 10,037; Referee: Rosendo Mendoza

June 9 14	Bethlehem Steel FC	1–4	Nashville SC	Chester, Pennsylvania
5:00 PM CDT	Chambers 24', (yellow card) 49'; Cortés (yellow card) 42'	Report	Bourgeois (yellow card) 23'; Tribbett 27'; LaGrassa (yellow card) 41'; Mensah 63', (yellow card) 80'; Kimura 70'; Lancaster 83'	Stadium: Talen Energy Stadium; Attendance: 417; Referee: Thomas Snyder

June 16 15	Hartford Athletic	2–3	Nashville SC	East Hartford, Connecticut
3:00 PM EDT	Dalgaard 32' de Wit 58'; Gdula (yellow card) 90+4'	Report	Ríos 31', (yellow card) 88'; Moloto 62'; Lancaster 85'	Stadium: Rentschler Field; Attendance: 4,489; Referee: Luis Arroyo

June 22 16	Nashville SC	3–3	Ottawa Fury FC	Nashville, Tennessee
8:00 PM EDT	Ríos 9'; Mensah 55'; Lancaster 71'	Report	Mannella (yellow card) 37'; Samb (yellow card) 40'; Haworth 45'; François 50'; Fall 81'	Stadium: First Tennessee Park; Attendance: 6,697; Referee: Sergii Demianchuk

June 26 17	Nashville SC	Abandoned	New York Red Bulls II	Nashville, Tennessee
8:00 PM EDT	Moloto 22'; Lancaster 35'	Report	Jørgenson 6'	Stadium: First Tennessee Park; Referee: Matthew Franz
Note: Match abandoned at halftime due to inclement weather with Nashville leading 2 goals to 1.

June 29 18	North Carolina FC	1–0	Nashville SC	Cary, North Carolina
19:00 EDT	Speas 30'; Taylor (yellow card) 90+1'	Report		Stadium: Sahlen's Stadium at WakeMed Soccer Park; Attendance: 3,662; Referee: Guido Gonzales Jr.

July 6 19	Louisville City FC	2–1	Nashville SC	Louisville, Kentucky
7:00 PM EDT	Craig 65'; Hoppenot 74'	Report	Ríos 11'; Moloto (yellow card) 72'	Stadium: Louisville Slugger Field; Attendance: 9,892; Referee: Lorant Varga

July 17 20	Memphis 901 FC	0–2	Nashville SC	Memphis, Tennessee
7:30 PM	Morton (yellow card) 62'; Grandison (yellow card) 64'; Lindley (yellow card) 89'	Report	Ockford 42', (yellow card) 60'; Ríos 49'; Doyle (yellow card) 87'; Belmar (yellow card) 89'	Stadium: AutoZone Park; Attendance: 7,828; Referee: Alejandro Mariscal

July 27 21	Nashville SC	2–0	Indy Eleven	Nashville, Tennessee
8:00 PM EDT	Ríos 24', (yellow card) 57'; Winn 42'	Report	Pasher (yellow card) 17'	Stadium: Nissan Stadium; Attendance: 13,047; Referee: Elvis Osmanovic

August 3 22	Swope Park Rangers	0–2	Nashville SC	Kansas City, Kansas
7:00 PM	Andrade (yellow card) 66'; Allach (yellow card) 81'	Report	Moloto 43'; Ríos 47'	Stadium: Children's Mercy Park; Attendance: 638; Referee: Farhad Dadkho

August 7 23	Nashville SC	4–0	Hartford Athletic	Nashville, Tennessee
8:00 PM EDT	Tribbett 51'; Ríos 56'; Winn 64'; Lee 69' (o.g.)	Report	Jørgenson (red card) 5'; Dixon (yellow card) 53'	Stadium: First Tennessee Park; Attendance: 5,796; Referee: Eric Tattersall

August 10 24	Nashville SC	0–0	Bethlehem Steel FC	Nashville, Tennessee
8:00 PM EDT		Report	Chambers (yellow card) 90+4'	Stadium: First Tennessee Park; Attendance: 7,762; Referee: Sergii Demianchuk

August 17 25	Charlotte Independence	1–3	Nashville SC	Matthews, North Carolina
7:00 PM	Sabella (yellow card) 18'; Martínez 23', (yellow card) 55'; Johnson (yellow card) 51'; Taku (yellow card) 86'	Report	Ríos 7', 56' (pen.); Ockford (yellow card) 45+2'; Belmar 60'	Stadium: Sportsplex at Matthews; Attendance: 1,518; Referee: Chris Ruska

August 21 17	Nashville SC	1–2	New York Red Bulls II	Nashville, Tennessee
7:00 PM CDT	Tribbett 10'; Lasso (yellow card) 60' (yellow-red card) 65'	Report	Lema (yellow card) 42'; Stroud 44'; Duncan 71'; Koffi (yellow card) 75'; Tolkin (yellow card) 85'	Stadium: First Tennessee Park; Attendance: 7,002; Referee: Jon Freemon
Note: Reschedule of match abandoned due to inclement weather on June 26.

August 24 26	Nashville SC	2–1	Charleston Battery	Nashville, Tennessee
8:00 PM	Mensah 56'; LaGrassa (yellow card) 65'; Akinyode 90+3'	Report	Higashi 43'; Mueller (yellow card) 60'	Stadium: Nissan Stadium; Attendance: 6,662; Referee: Guido Gonzales Jr.

August 31 27	Tampa Bay Rowdies	1–2	Nashville SC	St. Petersburg, Florida
6:30 PM	Guenzatti 49'; Mkosana (yellow card) 90+3'	Report	Moloto 44'; Belmar 79'	Stadium: Al Lang Stadium; Attendance: 4,022; Referee: Daniel Gutierrez

September 7 28	Saint Louis FC	1–0	Nashville SC	Fenton, Missouri
7:30 PM	Gee (yellow card) 12'; Umar (yellow card) 67'; Cicerone 77'	Report	LaGrassa (yellow card) 42'	Stadium: Toyota Stadium; Attendance: 5,284; Referee: Thomas Snyder

September 17 29	Nashville SC	1–0	Birmingham Legion	Nashville, Tennessee
7:00 PM CDT	Tribbett (yellow card) 2'; King (yellow card) 45+2'; Ward 90+3' (o.g.)	Report	Williams (yellow card) 36'	Stadium: First Tennessee Park; Attendance: 5,702; Referee: Matthew Thompson

September 21 30	Nashville SC	0–0	Pittsburgh Riverhounds SC	Nashville, Tennessee
8:00 PM EDT		Report	Adewole (red card) 40'	Stadium: First Tennessee Park; Attendance: 6,689; Referee: Farhad Dadkho

September 28 31	Loudoun United FC	0–2	Nashville SC	Leesburg, Virginia
7:30 PM	Amoh (yellow card) 37'; Paredes (yellow card) 60'	Report	Ríos 19'; Mensah 55'; Moloto (yellow card) 63'; Winn (yellow card) 90+4'	Stadium: Loudoun United Stadium; Attendance: 2,012; Referee: Danielle Chesky

October 8 32	Nashville SC	2–1	Louisville City FC	Nashville, Tennessee
8:00 PM EDT	Washington 5'; King (yellow card) 45+1'; Moloto (yellow card) 59'; Akinyode (yellow card) 62'; Ríos (yellow card) 81'; Ockford 90+2'; Belmar (yellow card) 90+4'	Report	Davis (yellow card) 41'; Craig (yellow card) 51'; Spencer 79'; Williams (yellow card) 90+2'	Stadium: First Tennessee Park; Attendance: 5,837; Referee: Lukasz Szpala

October 12 33	Nashville SC	2–0	North Carolina FC	Nashville, Tennessee
8:00 PM EDT	Mensah 32'; King (yellow card) 55'; Moloto 70'	Report	Brotherton (yellow card) 3'	Stadium: Nissan Stadium; Attendance: 9,101; Referee: Rosendo Mendoza

October 19 34	Nashville SC	3–0	Atlanta United 2	Nashville, Tennessee
8:30 PM	Lasso 23'; Ríos 32', 39'; Davis (yellow card) 67'	Report	Kissiedou (yellow card) 41'	Stadium: First Tennessee Park; Attendance: 6,773; Referee: Alejandro Mariscal

==== USL Cup Playoffs ====
October 26 Conference Quarterfinals	Nashville SC	3–1	Charleston Battery	Nashville, Tennessee
8:00 PM	Moloto 10'; King (yellow card) 38'; Ríos 43'; Ockford (yellow card) 77'; Davis (yellow card) 85'; Jones 88'	Report	Lewis 35' (pen.)	Stadium: First Tennessee Park; Attendance: 6,253; Referee: Greg Dopka

November 2 Conference Semifinals	Nashville SC	0–1	Indy Eleven	Nashville, Tennessee
8:00 PM EDT	Washington (yellow card) 24'; LaGrassa (yellow card) 81'; Ockford (yellow card) 90+2'	Report	Ayoze (yellow card) 22'; Ouimette (yellow card) 24'; Pasher 59'	Stadium: First Tennessee Park; Attendance: 4,174; Referee: Elton García

=== U.S. Open Cup ===
As a member of the USL Championship, Nashville SC entered the tournament in the Second Round, played May 14–15, 2019

May 14 Second Round	Nashville SC (Tennessee)	3–2	(Georgia (U.S. state)) South Georgia Tormenta FC 2	Murfreesboro, Tennessee
7:30 PM	Mensah 8'; Winn 32'; Lancaster 52'; Doyle (yellow card) 87'	Report	Billhardt 43'; Meehan 68'	Stadium: Dean A. Hayes Track & Soccer Stadium; Attendance: 1,008; Referee: Leland Grant

May 29 Third Round	Nashville SC (Tennessee)	1–1 (a.e.t.) (0–3 p)	(South Carolina) Charleston Battery	Murfreesboro, Tennessee
7:30 pm CDT	Jones (yellow card) 55'; Belmar 72'; Sparrow (yellow card) 96'; Davis (yellow card) 115'	Report	Daley 24' van Schaik (yellow card) 45+1'; Rittmeyer (yellow card) 106'	Stadium: Dean A. Hayes Stadium; Attendance: 769; Referee: Jared Simons
	Penalties
	Doyle (penalty missed); LaGrassa (penalty missed); Moloto (penalty missed)		Lewis (penalty scored); Archer (penalty scored) van Schaik (penalty missed); Svantesson (penalty scored)
