= List of Nashville SC players =

Nashville SC is an American soccer club founded in 2017, after the city of Nashville was awarded a Major League Soccer (MLS) franchise. Nashville SC began playing competitive soccer in the 2020 season. It plays its home games at Geodis Park, competing in the Eastern Conference of MLS.

== Players ==
All statistics are for the MLS regular season games only, including the group stage of the 2020 MLS is Back Tournament, and are correct through the 2023 season.

Key

DF = Defender

MF = Midfielder

FW = Forward/striker

=== Outfield players ===
Player	Position	Country	Years	Apps	Goals	Assists	Notes
David Accam	FW	Ghana	2020–2021	7	1	0	
Jalil Anibaba	DF	USA	2020–2021	21	1	0	
Brian Anunga	MF	Cameroon	2020–	79	1	0	
Dominique Badji	FW	Senegal	2020	12	1	1	
Brayan Beckeles	DF	Honduras	2020	2	0	0	
Josh Bauer	DF	USA	2022–	10	0	0	
Teal Bunbury	FW	USA	2022–	48	8	1	
Handwalla Bwana	MF	Somalia	2020–2022	7	0	0	
Jhonder Cádiz	FW	Venezuela	2020–2021	30	4	2	
Robert Castellanos	DF	USA	2021–2022	1	1	0	
Abu Danladi	FW	Ghana	2020–2021	25	3	1	
Sean Davis	MF	USA	2022–	66	1	3	
Irakoze Donasiyano	DF	Tanzania	2021–2022	1	0	0	
Aníbal Godoy	MF	Panama	2020–	88	2	8	
Luke Haakenson	MF	USA	2021–2023	58	2	3	
Alistair Johnston	DF	Canada	2020–2021	44	1	2	
Derrick Jones	MF	USA	2020	18	0	2	
Matt LaGrassa	MF	USA	2020–2021	20	0	1	
Randall Leal	MF	Costa Rica	2020–	101	16	20	
Aké Loba	FW	Ivory Coast	2021–2022	40	2	2	
Daniel Lovitz	DF	USA	2020–	111	2	17	
Lukas MacNaughton	DF	Canada	2023–	14	1	0	
Jack Maher	DF	USA	2020–	82	4	2	
Dax McCarty	MF	USA	2020–2023	105	2	13	
Jimmy Medranda	DF	Colombia	2020	1	0	0	
Eric Miller	DF	USA	2020–2022	43	0	0	
Shaq Moore	DF	USA	2022–	43	0	8	
Hany Mukhtar	MF	Germany	2020–	113	58	28	
Alex Muyl	MF	USA	2020–	111	6	9	
Dylan Nealis	DF	USA	2021	4	0	1	
Fafà Picault	FW	Haiti	2023	27	5	1	
Rodrigo Piñeiro	FW	Uruguay	2021–2022	2	0	0	
Daniel Rios	FW	Mexico	2020–2021	30	5	1	
Dave Romney	DF	USA	2020–2022	87	4	7	
C. J. Sapong	FW	USA	2021–2023	74	17	10	
Jacob Shaffelburg	FW	Canada	2022–	36	5	1	
Sam Surridge	FW	England	2023–	9	2	0	
Taylor Washington	DF	USA	2020–	67	1	2	
Alan Winn	FW	USA	2020	7	0	0	
Walker Zimmerman	DF	USA	2020–	101	12	5	
Ethan Zubak	FW	USA	2022–2023	20	0	1	

=== Goalkeepers ===
Player	Country	Years	Apps	Conceded	Shutouts	Notes
Elliot Panicco	USA	2020–	4	4	1	
Joe Willis	USA	2020–	121	124	41	

== By nationality ==
MLS regulations permit teams to name eight players from outside of the United States in their rosters. However, this limit can be exceeded by trading international slots with another MLS team, or if one or more of the overseas players is a refugee or has permanent residency rights in the USA.

Country	Number of players	Games
Cameroon	1	79
Canada	3	94
Colombia	1	1
Costa Rica	1	101
Germany	1	113
Ghana	2	32
Haiti	1	27
Honduras	1	2
Ivory Coast	1	40
Mexico	1	30
Panama	1	88
Senegal	1	12
Somalia	1	7
Tanzania	1	1
Uruguay	1	2
USA	22	1,252
Venezuela	1	30
