= 2020 Nashville SC season =

Nashville SC
2020 season
- General manager: Mike Jacobs
- Head coach: Gary Smith
- Stadium: Nissan Stadium
- MLS: Conference: 7th Overall: 14th
- MLS Cup Playoffs: Conference Semifinals
- U.S. Open Cup: Canceled
- MLS is Back Tournament: Withdrew
- Average home league attendance: 12,801 (Overall); 59,069 (Pre-Covid); 3,547 (Post-Covid)
- Biggest win: NSH 3–0 DAL (October 20); NSH 3–0 MIA (November 20)
- Biggest defeat: ATL 2–0 NSH (August 22); ORL 3–1 NSH (August 26); CLB 2–0 NSH (September 19); CLB 2–0 NSH (November 29)
Home colors	Away colors

The 2020 Nashville SC season was the club's first season as an organization and its first season as a member of Major League Soccer, after two seasons in the Eastern Conference of the USL Championship by a club of the same name.

Despite a brief stint in the Western Conference, the club moved to the Eastern Conference after the MLS is Back Tournament.

== Club ==
=== Current roster ===
As of October 21, 2020

Squad no.	Name	Nationality	Position(s)	Date of birth (age)	Previous club	Apps	Goals
Goalkeepers
1	Joe Willis	(United States)	GK	August 10, 1988 (age 37)	(United States) Houston Dynamo	23	0
28	C. J. Cochran	(United States)	GK	September 17, 1991 (age 34)	(United States) Oklahoma City Energy	0	0
30	Elliot Panicco	(United States)	GK	November 18, 1996 (age 29)	(United States) UNC Charlotte	0	0
Defenders
2	Daniel Lovitz	(United States)	DF	August 27, 1991 (age 34)	(Canada) Montreal Impact	21	1
3	Jalil Anibaba	(United States)	DF	October 19, 1988 (age 37)	(United States) New England Revolution	12	0
4	Dave Romney	(United States)	DF	June 12, 1993 (age 32)	(United States) LA Galaxy	23	1
5	Miguel Nazarit	(Colombia)	DF	May 20, 1997 (age 28)	(Colombia) Once Caldas	0	0
12	Alistair Johnston	(Canada)	DF	October 8, 1998 (age 27)	(United States) Wake Forest University	18	0
15	Eric Miller	(United States)	DF	January 15, 1993 (age 33)	(United States) New York City FC	6	0
16	Ken Tribbett	(United States)	DF	August 25, 1992 (age 33)	(United States) Nashville SC (USL)	0	0
18	Jack Maher (GA)	(United States)	DF	October 28, 1999 (age 26)	(United States) Indiana University	3	0
23	Taylor Washington	(United States)	DF	August 16, 1993 (age 32)	(United States) Nashville SC (USL)	14	0
25	Walker Zimmerman	(United States)	DF	May 19, 1993 (age 32)	(United States) Los Angeles FC	22	3
55	Brayan Beckeles	(Honduras)	DF	November 28, 1985 (age 40)	(Honduras) C.D. Olimpia	2	0
Midfielders
6	Dax McCarty	(United States)	MF	April 30, 1987 (age 38)	(United States) Chicago Fire FC	21	1
8	Randall Leal (DP)	(Costa Rica)	FW/MF	January 14, 1997 (age 29)	(Costa Rica) Deportivo Saprissa	21	3
10	Hany Mukhtar (DP)	(Germany)	MF	March 21, 1995 (age 30)	(Denmark) Brøndby IF	15	4
20	Aníbal Godoy	(Panama)	MF/DF	February 10, 1990 (age 36)	(United States) San Jose Earthquakes	20	1
21	Derrick Jones (HG)	(United States)	MF	March 3, 1997 (age 29)	(United States) Nashville SC (USL)	18	0
22	Matt LaGrassa	(United States)	MF	January 27, 1993 (age 33)	(United States) Nashville SC (USL)	8	0
27	Tah Brian Anunga	(Cameroon)	MF	August 10, 1996 (age 29)	(United States) Charleston Battery	14	0
29	Alex Muyl (HG)	(United States)	MF	September 30, 1995 (age 30)	(United States) New York Red Bulls	18	0
70	Handwalla Bwana (HG)	(Kenya)	MF	June 25, 1999 (age 26)	(United States) Seattle Sounders FC	2	0
Forwards
7	Abu Danladi	(Ghana)	FW	October 18, 1995 (age 30)	(United States) Minnesota United FC	17	2
9	Dominique Badji	(Senegal)	FW	October 16, 1992 (age 33)	(United States) FC Dallas	12	1
11	David Accam	(Ghana)	FW	September 28, 1990 (age 35)	(United States) Columbus Crew SC	7	1
14	Daniel Rios	(Mexico)	FW	February 22, 1995 (age 31)	(United States) Nashville SC (USL)	18	4
19	Alan Winn	(United States)	FW	February 18, 1996 (age 30)	(United States) Nashville SC (USL)	7	0
99	Jhonder Cadiz (DP)	(Venezuela)	FW	July 25, 1995 (age 30)	(France) Dijon FCO	7	2

== Roster transactions ==
=== In ===
#	Pos.	Player	Signed from	Details	Date	Source
14	FW	(Mexico) Daniel Rios	(Mexico) C.D. Guadalajara	Free transfer	November 20, 2018	
17	FW	(England) Cameron Lancaster	(United States) Louisville City FC	Free transfer	December 20, 2018	
21	MF	(United States) Derrick Jones	(United States) Philadelphia Union	Traded for $175,000 in GAM	May 1, 2019	
11	FW	(Ghana) David Accam	(United States) Columbus Crew SC	Traded for $300,000 in TAM, $100,000 in GAM	January 1, 2020	
20	MF	(Panama) Anibal Godoy	(United States) San Jose Earthquakes	Traded for $650,000 in GAM	January 1, 2020	
10	MF	(Germany) Hany Mukhtar	(Denmark) Brøndby IF	Transfer for $3,000,000, $100,000 in GAM to Seattle Sounders FC	August 27, 2019	
8	MF	(Costa Rica) Randall Leal	(Costa Rica) Deportivo Saprissa	Undisclosed transfer	September 6, 2019	
6	MF	(United States) Dax McCarty	(United States) Chicago Fire FC	Traded for 2nd round 2021 MLS SuperDraft pick, $50,000 in GAM, $50,000 in TAM	November 12, 2019	
4	DF	(United States) Dave Romney	(United States) LA Galaxy	Traded for $225,000 in GAM, additional $50,000 in GAM conditionally	November 12, 2019	
1	GK	(United States) Joe Willis	(United States) Houston Dynamo	Traded for Zarek Valentin, $75,000 in TAM	November 19, 2019	
13	GK	(United States) Adrian Zendejas	(United States) Sporting Kansas City	Traded for $50,000 in GAM, $125,000 in TAM, 2020 International roster spot	November 19, 2019	
2	DF	(United States) Daniel Lovitz	(United States) Montreal Impact	Traded for $50,000 in GAM, $50,000 in TAM, 2020 International roster spot	November 19, 2019	
22	MF	(United States) Matt LaGrassa	(United States) Nashville SC (USL)	Free transfer	November 22, 2019	
16	DF	(United States) Ken Tribbett	(United States) Nashville SC (USL)	Free transfer	November 22, 2019	
23	DF	(United States) Taylor Washington	(United States) Nashville SC (USL)	Free transfer	November 22, 2019	
19	FW	(United States) Alan Winn	(United States) Nashville SC (USL)	Free transfer	November 22, 2019	
9	FW	(Senegal) Dominique Badji	(United States) FC Dallas	Traded for $150,000 in GAM, $175,000 in TAM, additional $75,000 in GAM conditionally	December 2, 2019	
94	DF	(Honduras) Brayan Beckeles	(Honduras) C.D. Olimpia	Free transfer	December 4, 2019	
5	DF	(Venezuela) Miguel Nazarit	(Venezuela) Once Caldas	Free transfer	December 16, 2019	
27	MF	(Cameroon) Tah Brian Anunga	(United States) Charleston Battery	Free transfer	January 15, 2020	
25	DF	(United States) Walker Zimmerman	(United States) LAFC	Traded for $950,000 in GAM, 2020 International roster spot, additional $300,000 in GAM conditionally	February 11, 2020	
29	MF	(United States) Alex Muyl	(United States) New York Red Bulls	Traded for 2020 and 2021 International roster spots, additional $50,000 in GAM conditionally	August 13, 2020	
31	GK	(United States) Brady Scott	(Germany) FC Köln	Free transfer	August 17, 2020	
99	FW	(Venezuela) Jhonder Cadiz	(Portugal) S.L. Benfica	Loan until June 2021	September 8, 2020	
28	GK	(United States) C. J. Cochran	(United States) Oklahoma City Energy	Loan for the remainder of the 2020 Major League Soccer season	October 12, 2020	
70	MF	(Kenya) Handwalla Bwana	(United States) Seattle Sounders FC	Traded for Jimmy Medranda, $225,000 in GAM, additional $25,000 in GAM conditionally	October 21, 2020	

=== Out ===
#	Pos.	Player	Signed by	Details	Date	Source
—	DF	(United States) Zarek Valentin	(United States) Houston Dynamo	Traded for Joe Willis	November 19, 2019	
—	FW	(United States) Brandon Vazquez	(United States) FC Cincinnati	Traded for $150,000 in TAM, $50,000 in GAM conditionally	November 19, 2019	
17	FW	(England) Cameron Lancaster	(United States) Louisville City FC	On loan for the 2020 USL Championship season, move made permanent on November 19, 2020	February 6, 2020	
26	MF	(United States) Luke Haakenson	(United States) Charlotte Independence	On loan for the 2020 USL Championship season	March 6, 2020	
24	FW	(United States) Tanner Dieterich	(United States) Chattanooga Red Wolves SC	On loan for the 2020 USL League One season	August 7, 2020	
31	GK	(United States) Brady Scott	(United States) Sacramento Republic FC	On loan for the 2020 USL Championship season	August 24, 2020	
13	GK	(United States) Adrian Zendejas	(United States) Minnesota United FC	Traded for 4th Round 2021 MLS SuperDraft pick and up to $100,000 GAM conditionally	September 17, 2020	
94	DF	(Colombia) Jimmy Medranda	(United States) Seattle Sounders FC	Traded for Handwalla Bwana	October 21, 2020	

Additional source for roster transaction dates:

=== Re-Entry Draft pick ===
Pick	Position	Player	Previous club	Reference
2	DF	(United States) Eric Miller	New York City FC	

=== Expansion Draft picks ===
Pick	Position	Player	Previous club	Reference
2	FW	(Ghana) Abu Danladi	Minnesota United FC	
4	DF	(United States) Zarek Valentin	Portland Timbers	
6	DF	(United States) Jalil Anibaba	New England Revolution	
8	FW	(United States) Brandon Vazquez	Atlanta United FC	
10	MF/DF	(Colombia) Jimmy Medranda	Sporting Kansas City	

=== SuperDraft picks ===
Round	Position	Player	College	Reference
1 (2)	DF	(United States) Jack Maher	Indiana	
1 (11)	MF	(Canada) Alistair Johnston	Wake Forest	
1 (13)	GK	(United States) Elliot Panicco	Charlotte	
2 (28)	MF	(United States) Tanner Dieterich	Clemson	
4 (80)	MF	(United States) Luke Haakenson	Creighton	

== Competitions ==
=== Exhibitions ===
January 30 Preseason 1	Nashville SC	0–0	IF Elfsborg	Bradenton, Florida
2:00PM CST		Report		Stadium: IMG Academy
Note: Played in three 30-minute periods.

February 6 Preseason 2	Nashville SC	1–3	Chicago Fire FC	Tampa, Florida
2:00PM CST	Leal 1st half'	Report; Report	Sapong 1st half' Collier 1st half' Berić 2nd half'	Stadium: Pepin Stadium

February 9 Preseason 3	Nashville SC	4–1	Louisville City FC	Bradenton, Florida
3:00PM CST	Leal 3'; Ríos 15'; Accam 66' (pen.); Danladi 85'	Report; Report	Thiam 30'	Stadium: IMG Academy

February 12 Preseason 4	Nashville SC	1–0	Montreal Impact	St. Petersburg, Florida
6:00PM CST	Badji 78'	Report		Stadium: Al Lang Stadium

February 16 Preseason 5	Nashville SC	3–1	FC Cincinnati	Bradenton, Florida
5:00PM CST	Maher 20'; Ríos 64'; Jones 83' (pen.)	Report	Amaya 61'	Stadium: IMG Academy

February 19 Preseason 6	Nashville SC	1–1	D.C. United	Clearwater, Florida
5:00PM CST	Mukhtar 12' (pen.)	Report	Sorga 8'	Stadium: Joe DiMaggio Sports Complex

=== Major League Soccer ===
==== League tables ====
===== Eastern Conference =====
Pos	Team	Pld	W	L	T	GF	GA	GD	Pts	PPG	Qualification
1	Philadelphia Union	23	14	4	5	44	20	+24	47	2.04	MLS Cup First Round
2	Toronto FC	23	13	5	5	33	26	+7	44	1.91	MLS Cup First Round
3	Columbus Crew SC	23	12	6	5	36	21	+15	41	1.78	MLS Cup First Round
4	Orlando City SC	23	11	4	8	40	25	+15	41	1.78	MLS Cup First Round
5	New York City FC	23	12	8	3	37	25	+12	39	1.70	MLS Cup First Round
6	New York Red Bulls	23	9	9	5	29	31	−2	32	1.39	MLS Cup First Round
7	Nashville SC (Note: On June 10, 2020, Major League Soccer announced that Nashville SC would switch from the Western Conference to the Eastern Conference for the remainder of the 2020 season.)	23	8	7	8	24	22	+2	32	1.39	MLS Cup Play-in Round
8	New England Revolution	23	8	7	8	26	25	+1	32	1.39	MLS Cup Play-in Round
9	Montreal Impact	23	8	13	2	33	43	−10	26	1.13	MLS Cup Play-in Round
10	Inter Miami CF	23	7	13	3	25	35	−10	24	1.04	MLS Cup Play-in Round
11	Chicago Fire FC	23	5	10	8	33	39	−6	23	1.00	
12	Atlanta United FC	23	6	13	4	23	30	−7	22	0.96	
13	D.C. United	23	5	12	6	25	41	−16	21	0.91	
14	FC Cincinnati	23	4	15	4	12	36	−24	16	0.70	

Source: MLS
Rules for classification: 1) points per game; 2) total wins per match played; 3) total goal differential per match played; 4) total goals scored per match played; 5) fewest disciplinary points per match played; 6) away goal differential per away match played; 7) away goals scored per away match played; 8) home goal differential per home match played; 9) home goals scored per home match played; 10) coin toss or drawing of lots.

===== Overall =====
2020 MLS overall standings
Pos	Team	Pld	W	L	T	GF	GA	GD	Pts	PPG
12	Los Angeles FC	22	9	8	5	47	39	+8	32	1.45
13	New York Red Bulls	23	9	9	5	29	31	−2	32	1.39
14	Nashville SC	23	8	7	8	24	22	+2	32	1.39
15	New England Revolution	23	8	7	8	26	25	+1	32	1.39
16	San Jose Earthquakes	23	8	9	6	35	51	−16	30	1.30

Source: MLS
Rules for classification: 1) points per game; 2) total wins per match played; 3) total goal differential per match played; 4) total goals scored per match played; 5) fewest disciplinary points per match played; 6) away goal differential per away match played; 7) away goals scored per away match played; 8) home goal differential per home match played; 9) home goals scored per home match played; 10) coin toss or drawing of lots.

==== Match results ====
Win Draw Loss Postponed

February 29 1	Nashville SC	1–2	Atlanta United FC	Nashville, Tennessee
8:00 p.m. EST	Zimmerman 28'; Willis (yellow card) 90+4'	Report	Barco 9'; Hyndman 37'; Remedi (yellow card) 76'	Stadium: Nissan Stadium; Attendance: 59,069; Referee: Drew Fischer

March 8 2	Portland Timbers	1–0	Nashville SC	Portland, Oregon
6:00PM CDT	Mabiala (yellow card) 5'; Valeri 12'; Chará (yellow card) 84'; Duvall (yellow card) 90+2'	Report	Lovitz (yellow card) 29'	Stadium: Providence Park; Attendance: 25,218; Referee: Armando Villarreal

August 12 3	FC Dallas	0–1	Nashville SC	Frisco, Texas
7:30 PM CDT	Pomykal (yellow card) 62'	Report	Beckeles (yellow card) 28'; Lovitz (yellow card) 36'; Romney (yellow card) 57'; Leal (yellow card) 64'; Accam 86'	Stadium: Toyota Stadium; Attendance: 2,912; Referee: Armando Villarreal

August 16 4	FC Dallas	0–0	Nashville SC	Frisco, Texas
7:30 PM CDT	Jara (yellow card) 40'	Report	McCarty (yellow card) 69'	Stadium: Toyota Stadium; Attendance: 222; Referee: Rosendo Mendoza

August 22 5	Atlanta United FC	2–0	Nashville SC	Atlanta, Georgia
6:00 PM CDT	Lennon (yellow card) 6'; Walkes (yellow card) 28'; G. Martínez 40', 87'; Bello (yellow card) 78'	Report	Lovitz (yellow card) 48'	Stadium: Mercedes-Benz Stadium; Referee: Ted Unkel

August 26 6	Orlando City SC	3–1	Nashville SC	Orlando, Florida
6:30 PM CDT	Mueller 21'; Moutinho (yellow card) 44'; Dike 52', 71'; Michel (yellow card) 84'	Report	Romney 15'; Anibaba (yellow card) 43'; Johnston (yellow card) 90+5'	Stadium: Exploria Stadium; Referee: Marcos De Oliveira

August 30 7	Nashville SC	1–0	Inter Miami CF	Nashville, Tennessee
7:30 PM CDT	Badji (yellow card) 31'; Godoy 53'; Lovitz (yellow card) 68'; McCarty (yellow card) 70'	Report	Figal (yellow card) 23'; Reyes (yellow card) 36'; Pirez (yellow card) 52'	Stadium: Nissan Stadium; Attendance: 0 Referee: Rosendo Mendoza

September 2 8	Nashville SC	1–1	Orlando City SC	Nashville, Tennessee
7:30 PM CDT	Leal 47'	Report	Michel 17'	Stadium: Nissan Stadium; Attendance: 0 Referee: Jair Marrufo

September 6 9	Inter Miami CF	0–0	Nashville SC	Fort Lauderdale, Florida
7:00 PM CDT	Reyes (yellow card) 54'	Report	Godoy (yellow card) 19'; Danladi (yellow card) 63'	Stadium: Inter Miami CF Stadium; Referee: Nima Saghafi

September 12 10	Nashville SC	4–2	Atlanta United FC	Nashville, Tennessee
7:30 PM CDT	Badji 1'; Mukhtar 28'; McCarty 36'; Danladi 57'	Report	Larentowicz 19'; Bello 61'; Remedi (yellow card) 63'	Stadium: Nissan Stadium; Attendance: 0 Referee: Armando Villarreal

September 19 11	Columbus Crew SC	2–0	Nashville SC	Columbus, Ohio
6:30 PM CDT	Alashe (yellow card) 26'; Santos (yellow card) 27', (goal) 50'; Keita (yellow card) 57'; Zardes 90+3'	Report	Lovitz (yellow card) 37'; Muyl (yellow card) 71'; Godoy (yellow card) 76'	Stadium: Mapfre Stadium; Attendance: 1,500; Referee: Silviu Petrescu

September 23 12	Nashville SC	1–0	DC United	Nashville, Tennessee
7:30 PM CDT	Ríos 70'; Washington (yellow card) 79'	Report	Canouse (yellow card) 37' (yellow-red card) 45+3'	Stadium: Nissan Stadium; Attendance: 0 Referee: Tori Penso

September 26 13	Nashville SC	1–1	Houston Dynamo	Nashville, Tennessee
2:30 PM CDT	Ríos 49'	Report	Lundkvist (yellow card) 75'; Lemoine (yellow card) 81'; Figueroa 89'	Stadium: Nissan Stadium; Attendance: 0 Referee: Rubiel Vazquez

October 3 14	New England Revolution	0–0	Nashville SC	Foxborough, Massachusetts
6:30 PM CDT		Report	Anibaba (yellow card) 80'	Stadium: Gillette Stadium; Referee: David Gantar

October 6 15	Nashville SC	0–0	Minnesota United FC	Nashville, Tennessee
7:30 PM CDT	Leal (yellow card) 44'	Report		Stadium: Nissan Stadium; Attendance: 3,478; Referee: Joseph Dickerson

October 11 16	Sporting Kansas City	2–1	Nashville SC	Kansas City, Kansas
6:30 pm CDT	Sánchez (yellow card) 52'; Gerso 53'; Hurtado 79'	Report	Johnston (yellow card) 12' (yellow-red card) 54'; Zimmerman 15'; Lovitz (yellow card) 38'; Jones (yellow card) 76'	Stadium: Children's Mercy Park; Referee: Fotis Bazakos

October 14 17	Houston Dynamo	1–3	Nashville SC	Houston, Texas
7:00 PM CDT	Figueroa (yellow card) 22'; Quintero 75'; Martínez (yellow card) 82'	Report	Mukhtar 15', 23'; Danladi 19'; Beckeles (yellow card) 86'	Stadium: BBVA Compass Stadium; Attendance: 1,328; Referee: Nima Saghafi

October 20 18	Nashville SC	3–0	FC Dallas	Nashville, Tennessee
7:30 PM CDT	Leal 19'; Godoy (yellow card) 54'; Cadiz 73'; Ríos 88'	Report	Ferreira (yellow card) 64'; Bressan (yellow card) 70'	Stadium: Nissan Stadium; Attendance: 3,502; Referee: Silviu Petrescu

October 23 19	Nashville SC	1–1	New England Revolution	Nashville, Tennessee
8:52 PM CDT	McCarty (yellow card) 62'; Anunga (yellow card) 66'; Zimmerman 74'	Report	Buksa 77'; Manneh (yellow card) 89'	Stadium: Nissan Stadium; Attendance: 3,727; Referee: Robert Sibiga
Note: Kickoff delayed from 7:30 to 8:52 by lightning in area.

October 27 20	Montreal Impact	0–1	Nashville SC	Harrison, New Jersey
6:00 PM CDT	Corrales (yellow card) 53'; Raitala (yellow card) 80'; Binks (yellow card) 90'	Report	Leal 33'; Zimmerman (yellow card) 45+3'	Stadium: Red Bull Arena; Referee: Ismail Elfath

October 31 21	Nashville SC	1–1	Chicago Fire FC	Nashville, Tennessee
7:30 PM CDT	Ríos 28'; McCarty (yellow card) 90'	Report	Sekulić 42'	Stadium: Nissan Stadium; Attendance: 3,987; Referee: Malik Badawi

November 4 22	Nashville SC	0–1	FC Dallas	Nashville, Tennessee
7:30 PM CDT		Report	Hollingshead 19', (yellow card) 90+2'	Stadium: Nissan Stadium; Attendance: 3,789; Referee: Marcos de Oliveira

November 8 23	Orlando City SC	2–3	Nashville SC	Orlando, Florida
2:30 PM CDT	Dike 4'; Perea (yellow card) 17'; Nani 61'	Report	Lovitz 20'; Jones (yellow card) 28'; Godoy (yellow card) 29'; McCarty (yellow card) 37'; Mukhtar 88'; Cádiz 90+3'	Stadium: Exploria Stadium; Referee: David Gantar

=== MLS Cup Playoffs ===
November 20 Play-in round	Nashville SC	3–0	Inter Miami CF	Nashville, TN
8:00 PM CST	Leal 14'; Mukhtar 24' (pen.); Johnston (yellow card) 30'; McCarty 57'	Report	Nealis (yellow card) 5'; Trapp (yellow card) 31'	Stadium: Nissan Stadium; Attendance: 3,240; Referee: Ismail Elfath

November 24 First round	Toronto FC	0–1 (a.e.t.)	Nashville SC	East Hartford, CT
5:00 PM CST		Report	Ríos 108'	Stadium: Pratt & Whitney Stadium; Attendance: 0 Referee: Robert Sibiga

November 29 Conf. Semifinals	Columbus Crew SC	2–0 (a.e.t.)	Nashville SC	Columbus, OH
7:00 PM CST	Pedro Santos 99'; Zardes 103'	Report	Johnston (yellow card) 42'; Washington (yellow card) 111'	Stadium: MAPFRE Stadium; Attendance: 0 Referee: Armando Villarreal

=== MLS is Back Tournament ===
July 8, 2020 1	Nashville SC	Cancelled	Chicago Fire FC	Orlando, Florida
9:30 PM CDT				Stadium: ESPN Wide World of Sports Complex

July 14, 2020 2	Philadelphia Union	Cancelled	Nashville SC	Orlando, Florida
7:00PM CDT (UTC-05)				Stadium: ESPN Wide World of Sports Complex

July 20, 2020 3	Orlando City SC	Cancelled	Nashville SC	Orlando, Florida
8:00AM CDT (UTC-05)				Stadium: ESPN Wide World of Sports Complex

=== U.S. Open Cup ===
As a new MLS club, Nashville was scheduled to enter the competition in the Third Round, to be played April 21–23. The ongoing coronavirus pandemic, however, forced the U.S. Soccer Federation to cancel the tournament on August 17, 2020.
