= 2016 Tulsa Roughnecks FC season =

Tulsa Roughnecks FC
2016 season
- Owner: Daniel & Jeff Hubbard
- Head coach: David Irving
- Stadium: ONEOK Field
- USL: 15th, Western
- U.S. Open Cup: Second Round
- Average home league attendance: 3,950
Home colors	Away colors	Third colors

The 2016 Tulsa Roughnecks FC season was the club's second season of existence, and their second in the United Soccer League in the third division of American soccer. Including the previous iterations of franchises named "Tulsa Roughnecks", it was the 16th season of a soccer club named the "Roughnecks" playing in the Tulsa metropolitan area.

Outside of the USL, the Roughnecks participated in the 2016 U.S. Open Cup.

== Roster ==
No.	Name	Nationality	Position	Previous club
Goalkeepers
1	Alex Mangels	(United States)	GK	(United States) California Golden Bears
25	Jake Feener	(United States)	GK	(United States) Seattle Sounders U-23
-	Hunter Harrison	(United States)	GK	(United States) Oral Roberts Golden Eagles
Defenders
2	Gary Cennerazzo	(Scotland)	LB	(Scotland) The Spartans F.C.
3	Iarfhlaith Davoren	(Republic of Ireland)	LB	(Republic of Ireland) Sligo Rovers
4	Matt Whatley	(Wales)	CB	(Iceland) UMF Selfoss
5	David Abidor	(United States) (Israel)	CB	(Sweden) Dalkurd FF
6	Anthony Peters	(United States)	CB	(United States) Wilmington Hammerheads
13	Steven Miller	(United States)	RB	(United States) Wilmington Hammerheads
13	Raymond Lee	(United States)	LB	(United States) Philadelphia Union
16	Isaiah Schafer	(United States)	RB	(United States) Pittsburgh Riverhounds SC
21	Mason Grimes	(Guam)	CB	(United States) Temecula FC
21	Devin Morgan	(United States)	CB	(United States) St. John's Red Storm
-	Edgar Espinoza	(United States)	CB	(Armenia) FC Shirak Gyumri
Midfielders
7	Henri Manhebo	(United States)	DM	(United States) Clarkstown SC Eagles
20	Jasson Ramos Carpio	(Guatemala)	MF	(Honduras) Villanueva F.C.
24	Brady Ballew	(United States)	RM	(United States) Puget Sound Gunners FC
-	Adriano Pellegrino	(Australia)	AM	(Cambodia) Phnom Penh Crown
-	Ballobi	(Ivory Coast)	MF	(United States) Icon FC
-	Carlos Martinez	(United States)	AM	(United States) Sacramento Republic FC
-	Garry Lewis	(United States)	MF	(United States) Jacksonville Armada FC
-	Matt LaGrassa	(United States)	DM	(United States) Sacramento Republic FC
Forwards
5	Bryce Taylor	(United States)	RW	(United States) Wilmington Hammerheads
9	Sammy Ochoa	(United States) (Mexico)	CF	(United States) Wilmington Hammerheads
10	Kaleemullah Khan	(Pakistan)	CF	(United States) Sacramento Republic FC
17	Gustavo Villalobos	(United States)	LW	(Malta) Qormi FC
20	Cristian Mata	(United States)	FW	(United States) University of Tulsa Golden Hurricane
-	Chase Minter	(United States)	LW	(United States) Sacramento Republic FC
-	Kyle MacLeod	(United States)	CF	(United States) San Diego Toreros
-	Taylor Morgan	(England)	CF	(Sweden) Östersunds FK

== Competitions ==
=== USL ===
==== Standings ====
Pos	Team	Pld	W	D	L	GF	GA	GD	Pts
11	Real Monarchs	30	10	6	14	31	41	−10	36
12	Seattle Sounders 2	30	9	8	13	35	50	−15	35
13	Arizona United	30	9	7	14	40	46	−6	34
14	Saint Louis FC	30	8	10	12	42	44	−2	34
15	Tulsa Roughnecks	30	5	4	21	25	64	−39	19

Source: 2016 USL Standings
Rules for classification: 1) total wins; 2) total goal differential; 3) total goals scored; 4) points earned against top four Conference finishers; 5) disciplinary points; 6) coin toss or drawing of lots

=== U.S. Open Cup ===
May 18	Des Moines Menace (PDL)	2–0	Tulsa Roughnecks FC	West Des Moines, Iowa
7:30 PM CDT	Hoek 70'; Ibisevic 82'	Report		Stadium: Valley Stadium; Referee: Robert Sorey
