= Bradley Bourgeois =

American soccer player

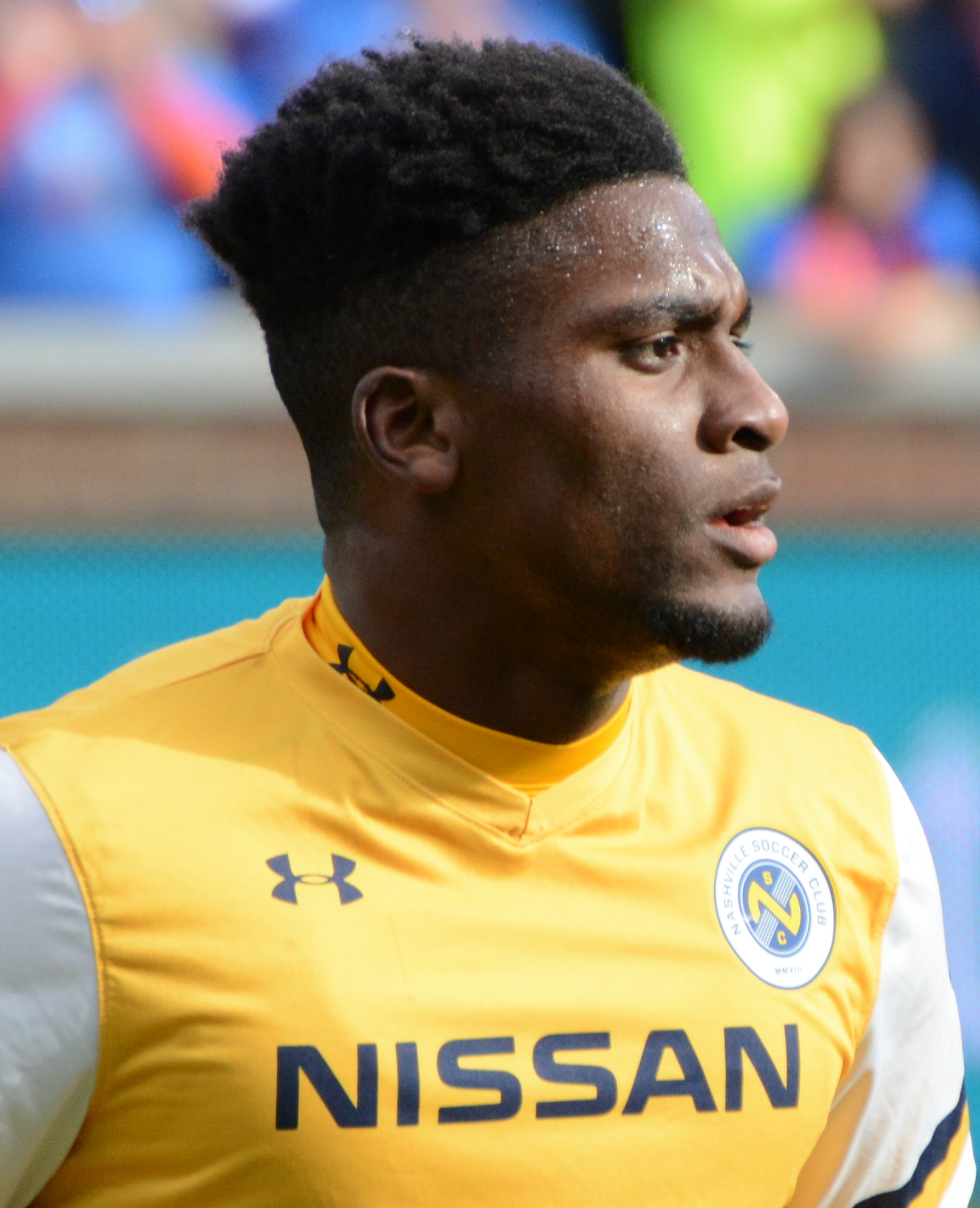
- Bourgeois with Nashville SC in 2018

Personal information
- Date of birth: April 13, 1994 (age 32)
- Place of birth: Cypress, Texas, United States
- Height: 5 ft 11 in (1.80 m)
- Position: Defender

Youth career
- 2009–2012: Houston Dynamo

College career
Years	Team	Apps	(Gls)
2012–2015	Tulsa Golden Hurricane	81	(7)

Senior career*
Years	Team	Apps	(Gls)
2013	Houston Dutch Lions	7	(0)
2014–2015	Tulsa Athletics	21	(1)
2016	Houston Dynamo	0	(0)
2016	→ Rio Grande Valley FC (loan)	6	(1)
2017	Tulsa Roughnecks	29	(1)
2018–2019	Nashville SC	39	(2)
2020–2024	FC Tulsa	113	(1)
- * Club domestic league appearances and goals as of November 1, 2024

Bradley Bourgeois (born April 13, 1994) is an American former professional soccer player.

== Career ==
=== Amateur ===
Bourgeois played four years of college soccer at the University of Tulsa from 2012 to 2015. He was a four-year letter winner, had seven goals and one assist for 15 points, started all 81 games of his career, was a three-time all-conference performer, and helped lead the team to three conference championships.

While at college, Bourgeois also appeared for Houston Dutch Lions and Tulsa Athletics.

=== Professional ===
On December 23, 2015, Bourgeois signed as a Homegrown Player with Houston Dynamo in Major League Soccer.

Bourgeois was sent on loan to Houston's United Soccer League affiliate club Rio Grande Valley FC Toros in March 2016.

He was released by Houston on June 14, 2016.

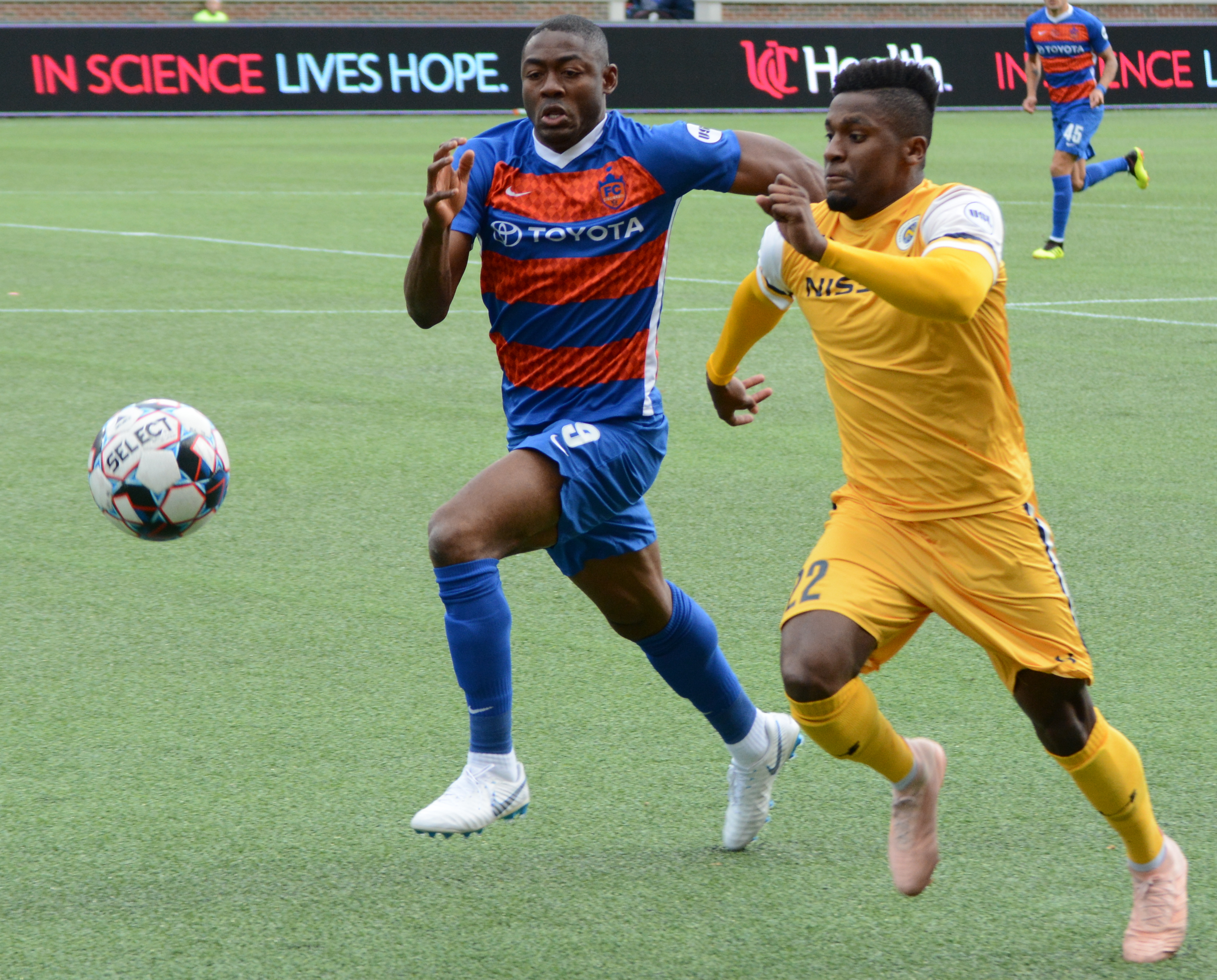
Bourgeois (right) playing for Nashville SC in 2018

On December 14, 2017, Nashville SC announced the signing of Bourgeois.

After Nashville's move to MLS, Bourgeois was released and returned to USL Championship side FC Tulsa.

== Career statistics ==
As of April 16, 2019

Club	Season	League			US Open Cup		Playoffs (Note: Includes PDL PLayoffs, USL Championship PLayoffs and MLS Cup Playoffs)		Continental (Note: Includes CONCACAF Champions League)		Total	
Club	Season	Division	Apps	Goals	Apps	Goals	Apps	Goals	Apps	Goals	Apps	Goals
Houston Dynamo	2016	MLS	0	0	0	0	—		—		0	0
Rio Grande Valley FC (loan)	2016	USL	6	1	—		0	0	—		6	1
Tulsa Roughnecks	2017	USL	30	1	2	0	1	0	0	0	33	1
Nashville SC	2018	USL	23	1	2	0	1	1	—		26	2
Nashville SC	2019	USL Championship	0	0	0	0	—		—		0	0
Career Total			59	3	4	0	2	1	0	0	65	4
