= Miguel Nazarit =

Colombian footballer (born 1997)

Personal information
- Full name: Miguel Angel Nazarit Mina
- Date of birth: May 20, 1997 (age 29)
- Place of birth: Cali, Colombia
- Height: 6 ft 1 in (1.85 m)
- Position: Defender

Senior career*
Years	Team	Apps	(Gls)
2017–2019	Once Caldas	39	(1)
2020–2022	Nashville SC	0	(0)
2021	→ Santa Fe (loan)	3	(0)
2022	Deportivo Cali	4	(0)
2022	Inter Turku	5	(0)

International career^{‡}
2019	Colombia U23	0	(0)
- * Club domestic league appearances and goals as of October 16, 2022 ‡ National team caps and goals as of December 16, 2019

Miguel Ángel Nazarit Mina, known as Miguel Nazarit (born May 20, 1997) is a Colombian footballer.

== Career ==
Nazarit began his professional career with Once Caldas in Manizales. During his three-year tenure with the club, they played in the Colombian Categoría Primera A, the top tier of football in Colombia. A right-footed centerback, Nazarit finished his Once Caldas career with a lone goal in 39 appearances.

On December 16, 2019, his transfer to MLS franchise Nashville SC was announced. He joined Nashville for the team's inaugural 2020 season in MLS.

On 22 January 2021, Nazarit was loaned to Santa Fe for their entire 2021 season.

On 18 January 2022, Nashville opted to waive and buyout Nazarit's contract.

== Personal life ==
Nazarit was born in Cali, Colombia.

== Career statistics ==
=== Club ===
As of match played 13 December 2021

Appearances and goals by club, season and competition
Club	Season	League			National Cup (Note: Includes Copa Colombia and Suomen Cup)		Continental		Total	
Club	Season	Division	Apps	Goals	Apps	Goals	Apps	Goals	Apps	Goals
Once Caldas	2017	Categoría Primera A	9	1	5	0	—		14	1
Once Caldas	2018	Categoría Primera A	17	0	0	0	—		17	0
Once Caldas	2019	Categoría Primera A	13	0	3	0	0	0	16	0
Once Caldas	Total		39	1	8	0	0	0	47	1
Nashville SC	2020	MLS	0	0	—		—		0	0
Santa Fe (loan)	2021	Categoría Primera A	3	0	0	0	—		3	0
Deportivo Cali	2022	Categoría Primera A	4	0	0	0	1 (Note: Appearance(s) in Copa Sudamericana)	0	5	0
Inter Turku	2022	Veikkausliiga	5	0	1	0	0	0	6	0
Career total			51	1	9	0	1	0	61	1
