= Taylor Washington =

American soccer player (born 1993)

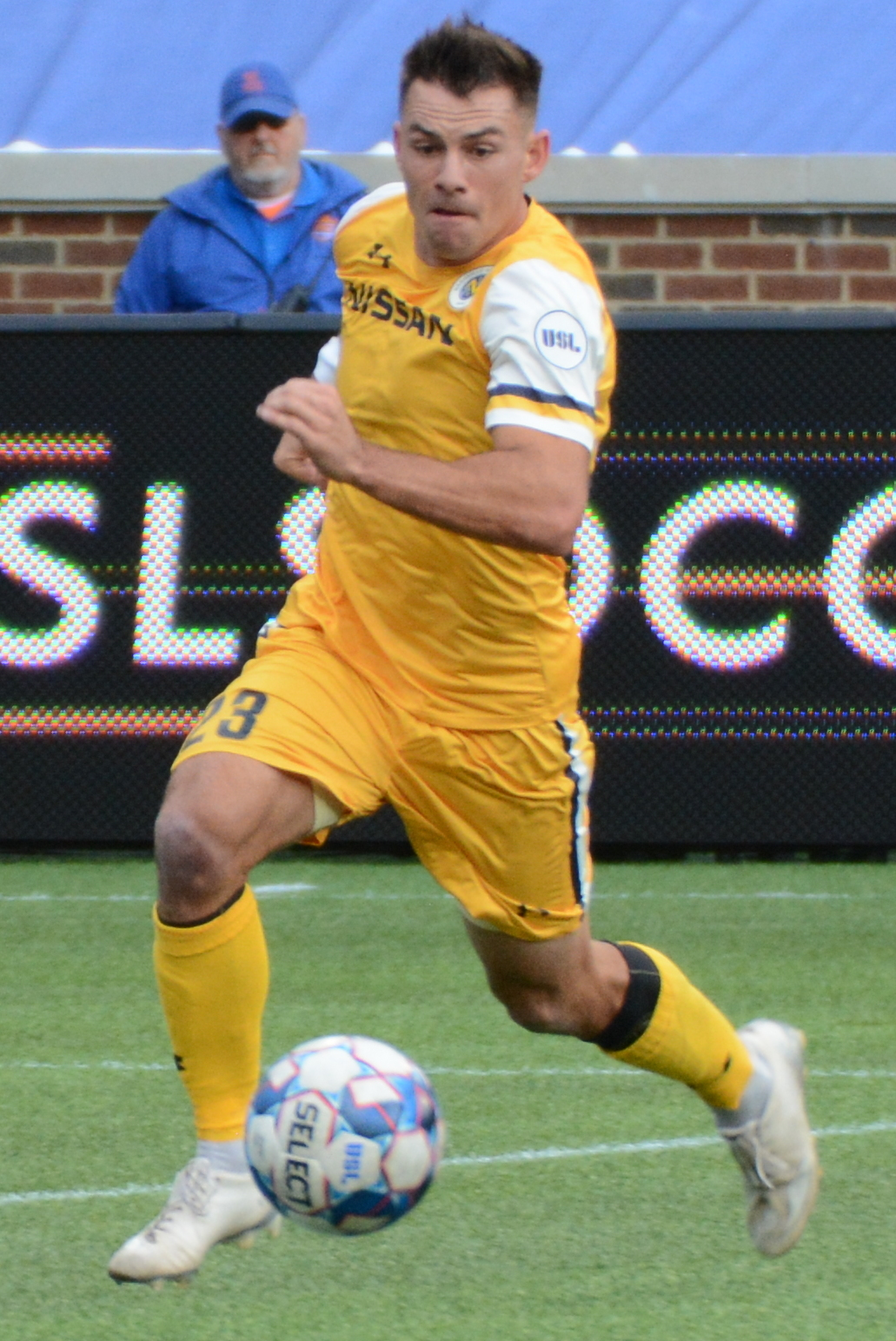
- Washington playing for Nashville SC in 2018

Personal information
- Full name: Taylor Brennan Washington
- Date of birth: August 16, 1993 (age 33)
- Place of birth: New York City, New York, United States
- Height: 5 ft 10 in (1.78 m)
- Position: Defender

College career
| Years | Team | Apps | (Gls) |
| 2011–2012 | Boston University Terriers | 18 | (1) |
| 2013–2015 | George Mason Patriots | 53 | (1) |

Senior career*
| Years | Team | Apps | (Gls) |
| 2012 | Worcester Hydra | 5 | (0) |
| 2015 | D.C. United U-23 | 13 | (0) |
| 2016 | Philadelphia Union | 0 | (0) |
| 2016 | → Bethlehem Steel (loan) | 28 | (0) |
| 2017 | Pittsburgh Riverhounds | 29 | (0) |
| 2018–2019 | Nashville SC | 59 | (2) |
| 2020–2025 | Nashville SC | 82 | (1) |
| 2025–2025 | Huntsville City FC | 0 | (0) |
| Total | | 212 | (3) |
- * Club domestic league appearances and goals

Taylor Brennan Washington (born August 16, 1993) is an American former professional soccer player who played as a defender.

== Career ==
=== Youth and college ===
Washington was born in New York where he played youth soccer for FC Somers and FC Westchester, MLS Next. He played 4 years of soccer for Rye Country Day School. He played four years of college soccer, one year at Boston University in 2011, before moving to the George Mason Patriots in 2013. In 2013, the Patriots won the Atlantic 10 Championship and reached the 2nd round of the NCAA tournament, and Washington was named to the all-Atlantic 10 first team.

While at college, Washington also appeared for Premier Development League side Worcester Hydra in 2012 and captaining the D.C. United U-23 in 2015.

Taylor captained his team his senior year and received George Mason's student athlete of the year award in 2016. Taylor was named to the Atlantic 10 commissioner's honor roll.

=== Professional ===
Following his senior season in 2015, Washington participated in the 2016 MLS Player Combine. On January 14, 2016, Washington was selected 23rd overall in the 2016 MLS SuperDraft by Philadelphia Union.

He made his professional debut with Bethlehem Steel FC on March 25, 2016, starting in a 1–0 win over FC Montreal. Washington made one appearance for the Union in a friendly against English Premier League side Crystal Palace on July 13, 2016.

After the 2016 season, Taylor Washington's contract option with the Philadelphia Union was not renewed.

On December 20, 2016, Washington signed with the USL's Pittsburgh Riverhounds.

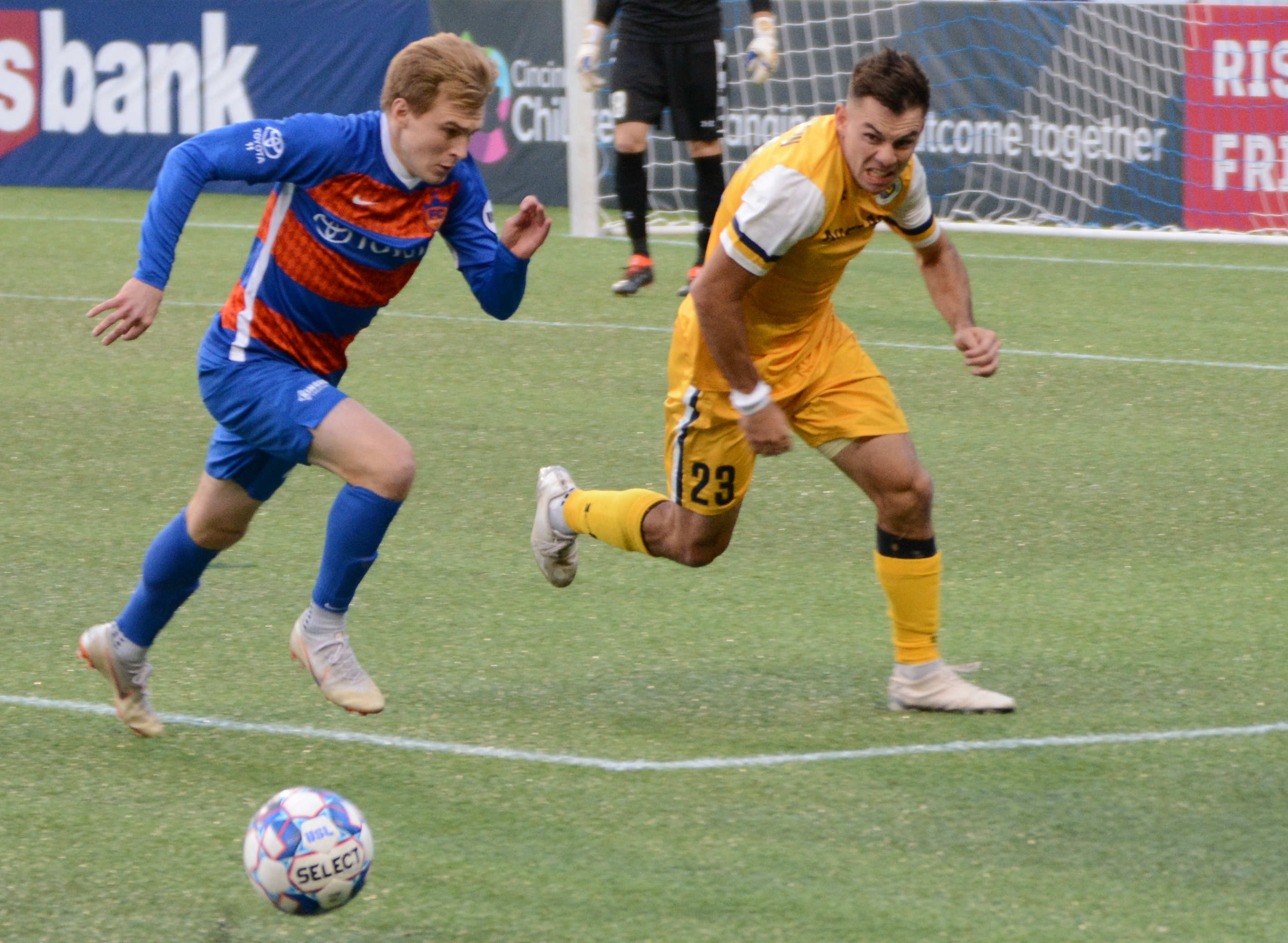
Washington (right) with Nashville SC in 2018

On December 7, 2017, Washington was announced as a new signing by Nashville SC ahead of their debut USL season.

Washington, after two years playing for the Nashville SC USL team, was signed to an MLS contract with Nashville on November 22, 2019, along with three other USL players.

Washington announced his retirement on October 15, 2025.

== Career statistics ==
As of match played November 30, 2020

| Club performance | | | League | | National cup | | Other | | Total | |
| Club | Season | League | Apps | Goals | Apps | Goals | Apps | Goals | Apps | Goals |
|---|---|---|---|---|---|---|---|---|---|---|
| Worcester Hydra | 2012 | PDL | 5 | 0 | 0 | 0 | — | | 5 | 0 |
| D.C. United U-23 | 2015 | PDL | 13 | 0 | — | | — | | 13 | 0 |
| Philadelphia Union | 2016 | MLS | 0 | 0 | 0 | 0 | — | | 0 | 0 |
| Bethlehem Steel FC (loan) | 2016 | USL | 28 | 0 | — | | — | | 28 | 0 |
| Pittsburgh Riverhounds | 2017 | USL | 29 | 0 | 1 | 0 | — | | 30 | 0 |
| Nashville SC | 2018 | USL | 32 | 1 | 3 | 0 | 1 (Note: Appearance(s) in USL Playoffs) | 0 | 36 | 1 |
| Nashville SC | 2019 | USL | 27 | 1 | 2 | 0 | 2 | 0 | 31 | 1 |
| Nashville SC | Total | | 59 | 2 | 5 | 0 | 3 | 0 | 67 | 2 |
| Nashville SC | 2020 | MLS | 14 | 0 | — | | 3 (Note: Appearances in MLS Cup Playoffs) | 0 | 17 | 0 |
| Nashville SC | 2021 | MLS | 14 | 0 | — | | 3 (Note: Appearances in MLS Cup Playoffs) | 0 | 17 | 0 |
| Nashville SC | 2022 | MLS | 14 | 1 | 3 | 0 | 0 | 0 | 17 | 1 |
| Nashville SC | 2023 | MLS | 22 | 1 | 3 | 0 | 2 | 0 | 27 | 1 |
| Nashville SC | 2024 | MLS | 15 | 0 | — | | 4 | 0 | 19 | 0 |
| Nashville SC | 2025 | MLS | 0 | 0 | 1 | 0 | 0 | 0 | 1 | 0 |
| Nashville SC | Total | | 79 | 2 | 7 | 0 | 12 | 0 | 98 | 2 |
