= Vinnie Vermeer =

Dutch footballer

Personal information
- Full name: Vinnie Maria Vermeer
- Date of birth: 2 July 1995 (age 31)
- Place of birth: Berkel-Enschot, Netherlands
- Height: 1.72 m (5 ft 8 in)
- Position: Midfielder

Team information
- Current team: UDI '19
- Number: 5

Youth career
- –2005: Brabant United
- 2005–2011: PSV

Senior career*
Years	Team	Apps	(Gls)
2011–2014	FC Eindhoven	25	(0)
2014–2015	NAC Breda	0	(0)
2015	Deportivo Azogues		
2016–2019	NAC Breda	2	(0)
2017	→ FC Oss (loan)	0	(0)
2018	→ TEC (loan)	15	(0)
2019	Nashville SC	2	(0)
2019	→ Las Vegas Lights (loan)	12	(0)
2020	FC Eindhoven	2	(0)
2022–2024	TEC	33	(0)
2024–	UDI '19		
- * Club domestic league appearances and goals as of 4 August 2025

Vinnie Maria Vermeer (born 2 July 1995) is a Dutch footballer who plays as a midfielder for UDI '19.

== Club career ==
He made his professional debut in the Eerste Divisie for FC Eindhoven on 28 January 2012 in a game against SC Veendam.

Vermeer signed with NAC Breda in September 2014. After six months without playing, he moved to Deportivo Azogues, playing in Ecuadorian Serie B. He returned to NAC in June 2016 and signed a contract there until mid-2019. In the summer of 2017, he was sent on a six-month loan deal to FC Oss. In January 2018, it was announced that Vermeer would finish the season on loan at Tweede Divisie club TEC. Vermeer returned to NAC Breda after his loan period in July 2018.

On 18 January 2019, NAC Breda announced that Vermeer's contract had been mutually terminated to allow him to go on trial with Nashville SC of the USL. On 22 February 2019, Nashville SC announced they had signed Vermeer to a permanent contract following a successful period on trial with the club. On 3 July 2019, Nashville SC announced that they had loaned Vermeer to Las Vegas Lights FC for the rest of the 2019 season. He was recalled from his loan by Nashville a week later, but returned to Las Vegas on loan on 1 August.

Vermeer moved back to the Netherlands on 27 August 2020, signing with his former team FC Eindhoven after an absence of six years. He already left Eindhoven again on 10 November, due to lacking perspectives of playing time.

== Personal life ==
Born in the Netherlands, Vermeer is of Indonesian and Surinamese descent.
