= Matt LaGrassa =

American soccer player (born 1993)

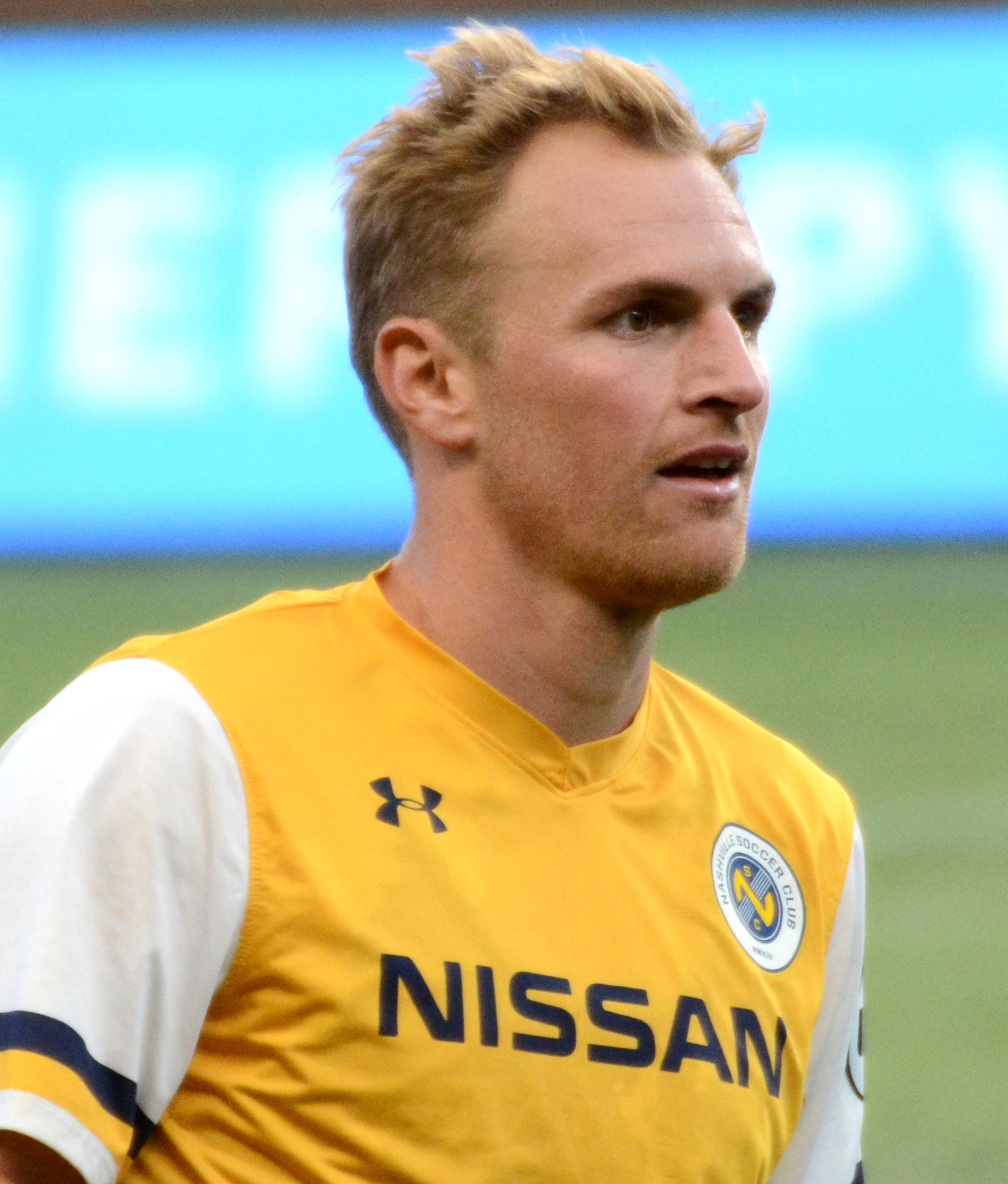
- LaGrassa in 2018

Personal information
- Full name: Matthew R. LaGrassa
- Date of birth: January 27, 1993 (age 33)
- Place of birth: Elk Grove, California, United States
- Height: 1.82 m (6 ft 0 in)
- Position: Midfielder

College career
| Years | Team | Apps | (Gls) |
| 2011–2015 | Cal Poly Mustangs | 77 | (18) |

Senior career*
| Years | Team | Apps | (Gls) |
| 2011–2012 | Des Moines Menace | 9 | (2) |
| 2013–2015 | Ventura County Fusion | 23 | (2) |
| 2016 | Sacramento Republic | 13 | (1) |
| 2016 | → Tulsa Roughnecks (loan) | 4 | (0) |
| 2017 | Reno 1868 | 31 | (1) |
| 2018–2019 | Nashville SC | 62 | (5) |
| 2020–2021 | Nashville SC | 20 | (0) |
| 2022–2023 | Sacramento Republic | 49 | (4) |
- * Club domestic league appearances and goals as of November 16, 2023

Matthew R. LaGrassa (born January 27, 1993) is an American former professional soccer player.

== Career ==
=== College ===
LaGrassa grew up in Elk Grove, California, where he attended Pleasant Grove High School. He played four years of college soccer at Cal Poly University between 2012 and 2015, including a red-shirted year in 2011.

LaGrassa appeared for Premier Development League side Des Moines Menace in 2011 and 2012, and Ventura County Fusion in 2013, 2014 and 2015.

=== Professional ===
LaGrassa signed with United Soccer League side Sacramento Republic on January 20, 2016.

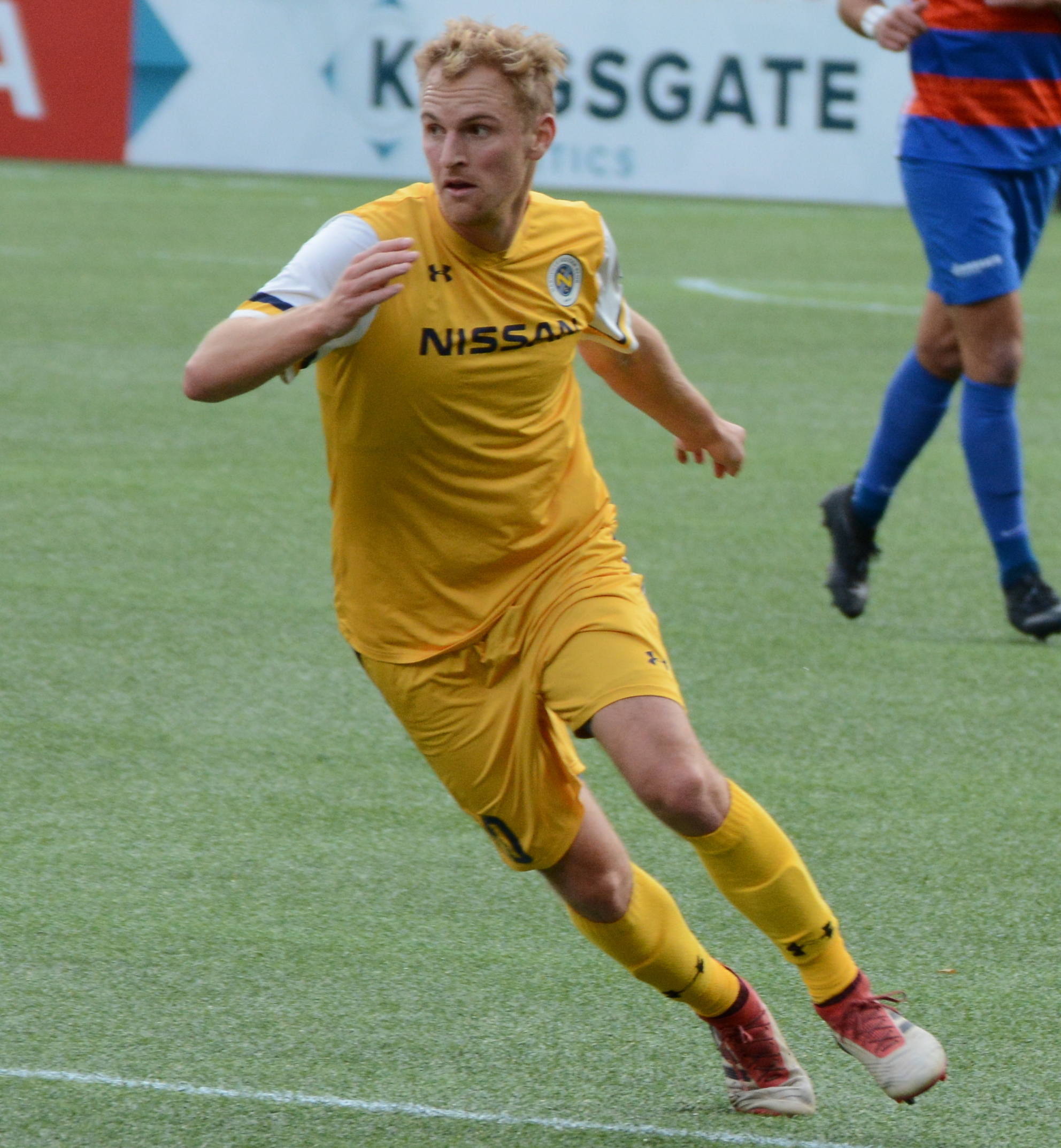
LaGrassa playing for Nashville SC in 2018

LaGrassa was announced as one of United Soccer League club Nashville SC's first signings on November 30, 2017. Following the 2021 season LaGrassa's contract option was declined by Nashville and he became a free agent.

On January 13, 2022, LaGrassa returned to his former club Sacramento Republic.

LaGrassa announced his retirement from the professional game on November 16, 2023.

== Career statistics ==
=== Club ===
As of match played 25 November 2020

Appearances and goals by club, season and competition
| Club | Season | League | | | National Cup | | Other | | Total | |
| Club | Season | Division | Apps | Goals | Apps | Goals | Apps | Goals | Apps | Goals |
|---|---|---|---|---|---|---|---|---|---|---|
| Des Moines Menace | 2011 | USL PDL | 7 | 2 | 1 | 0 | — | | 8 | 2 |
| Des Moines Menace | 2012 | USL PDL | 2 | 0 | — | | — | | 2 | 0 |
| Des Moines Menace | Total | | 9 | 2 | 1 | 0 | — | | 10 | 2 |
| Ventura County Fusion | 2013 | USL PDL | 9 | 1 | — | | — | | 9 | 1 |
| Ventura County Fusion | 2014 | USL PDL | ? | ? | — | | — | | ? | ? |
| Ventura County Fusion | 2015 | USL PDL | ? | ? | 1 | 1 | — | | ? | ? |
| Ventura County Fusion | Total | | 23 | 2 | 1 | 1 | — | | 24 | 3 |
| Sacramento Republic FC | 2016 | USL | 13 | 1 | — | | 1 (Note: Appearance(s) in USL Playoffs) | 0 | 14 | 1 |
| Tulsa Roughnecks (loan) | 2016 | USL | 4 | 0 | — | | — | | 4 | 0 |
| Reno 1868 | 2017 | USL | 31 | 1 | 2 | 0 | 1 | 0 | 34 | 1 |
| Nashville SC | 2018 | USL | 33 | 3 | 4 | 1 | 1 | 0 | 38 | 4 |
| Nashville SC | 2019 | USL | 29 | 2 | 1 | 0 | 2 | 0 | 32 | 2 |
| Nashville SC | Total | | 62 | 5 | 5 | 1 | 3 | 0 | 70 | 6 |
| Nashville SC | 2020 | MLS | 8 | 0 | — | | 1 (Note: Appearance(s) in MLS Cup Playoffs) | 0 | 9 | 0 |
| Career total | | | 150 | 11 | 9 | 2 | 6 | 0 | 165 | 13 |
