= Lebogang Moloto =

South African soccer player

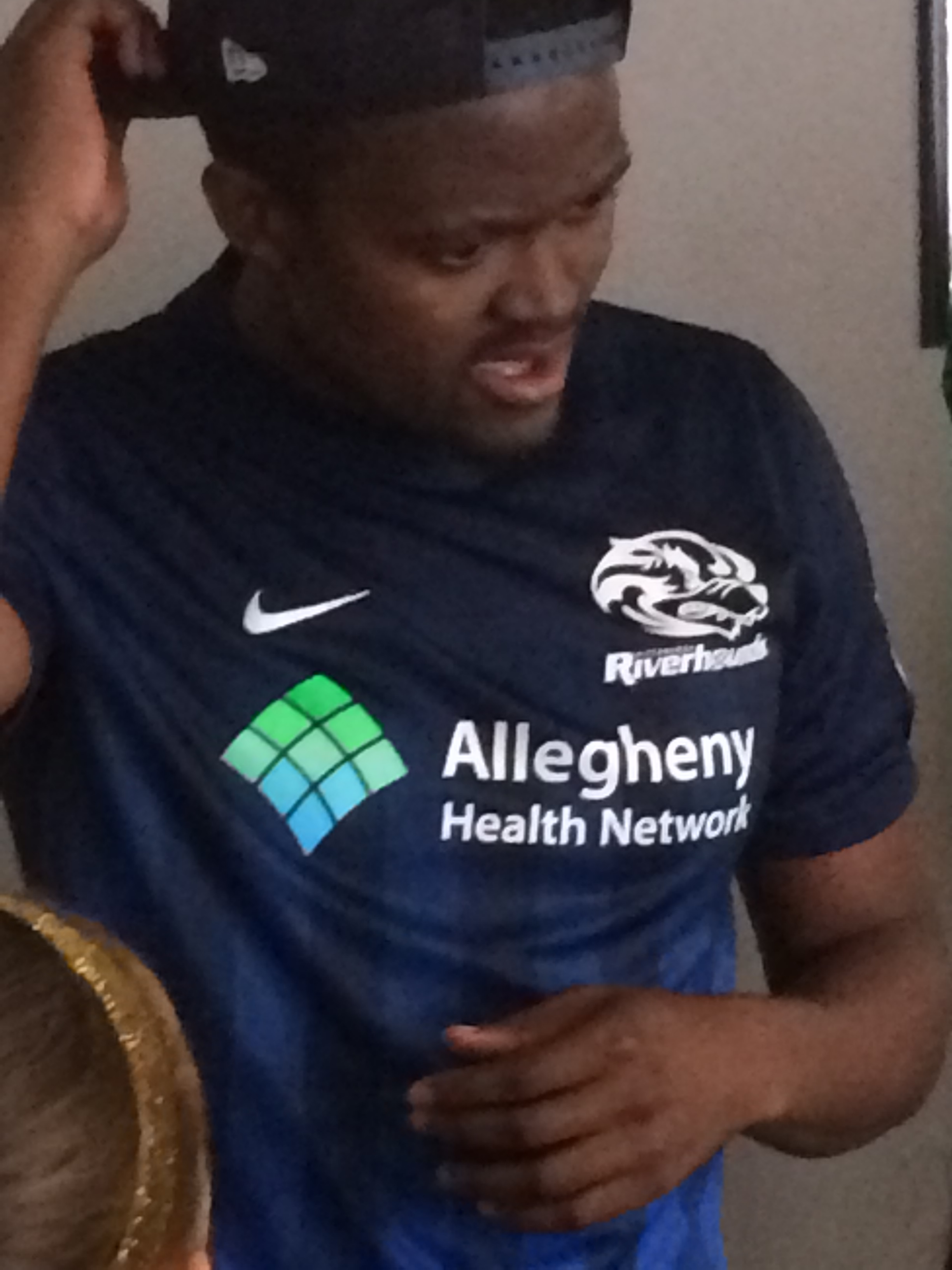
- Moloto with Riverhounds, 2016

Personal information
- Full name: Matshidiso Lebogang Moloto
- Date of birth: 21 May 1990 (age 36)
- Place of birth: Polokwane, South Africa
- Height: 1.80 m (5 ft 11 in)
- Position: Midfielder

College career
Years	Team	Apps	(Gls)
2009–2012	Lindsey Wilson Blue Raiders		

Senior career*
Years	Team	Apps	(Gls)
2010–2013	Des Moines Menace	34	(11)
2014	United FC		
2015–2016	Pittsburgh Riverhounds	52	(7)
2017	Swope Park Rangers	33	(7)
2018–2019	Nashville SC	59	(12)
2020–2022	FC Tulsa	61	(4)

International career^{‡}
2007–2008	South Africa U17		
- * Club domestic league appearances and goals as of 13:22, 20 October 2022 (UTC) ‡ National team caps and goals as of 14:18, 10 August 2015 (UTC)

Lebogang "Lebo" Moloto (born 21 May 1990) is a South African soccer player.

== Career ==
=== Youth and college ===
Moloto moved to the United States to play college soccer at Lindsey Wilson College in 2009. Moloto was offered a scholarship after his coach at Lindsey Wilson saw him in an international youth tournament in Cape Town at age 16. Moloto went on to play for the Blue Raiders for four seasons, amassing 42 goals and 20 assists in 83 career matches. Moloto won multiple individual and club honors including being named an NAIA All-American each season and winning the NAIA Most Outstanding Offensive Player award as a freshman. The team also won two national titles with Moloto as a member.

=== Semi-professional ===
While enrolled at Lindsey Wilson College, Moloto also played for the Des Moines Menace of the semi-professional Premier Development League. Over three seasons with the club, he tallied 11 goals and six assists in 34 appearances. Moloto also made multiple appearances in the U.S. Open Cup with the club, including a two-goal performance against the Milwaukee Bavarians on 15 May 2012 which saw them advance to the second round to play the Minnesota Stars.

=== Professional ===
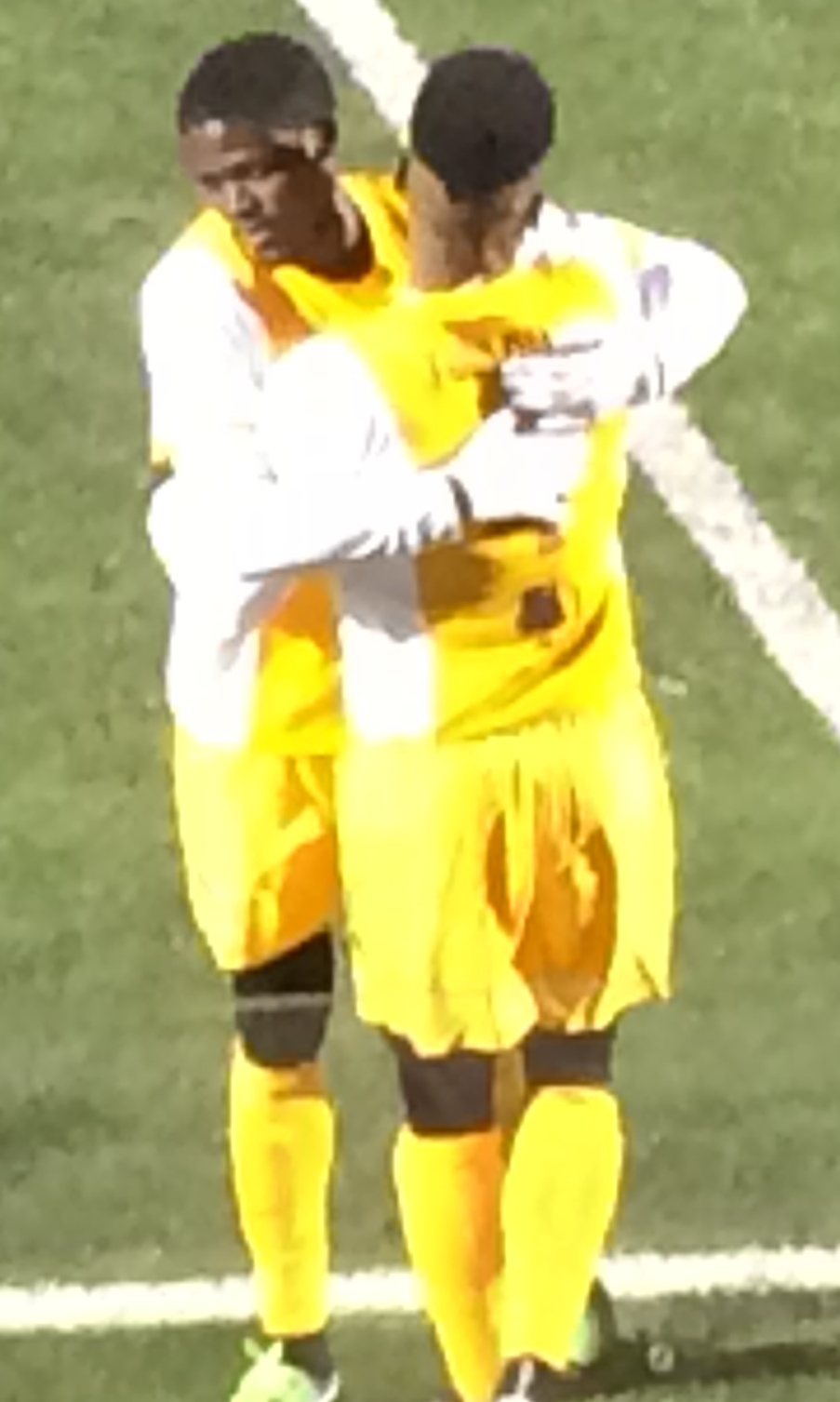
Moloto (left) coming off for Max Touloute on Riverhounds debut

Moloto was selected by Seattle Sounders FC with the 54th pick in the 2013 MLS Supplemental Draft but was ultimately not signed by the club after leaving camp to continue his schooling. He was expected to rejoin the club in the future after completing his degree. Originally, Moloto was expected to be a first or second round pick in the MLS SuperDraft but saw his stock fall going into the MLS Combine.

On 2 March 2015, it was announced that Moloto was returning to the United States after signing a contract with the Pittsburgh Riverhounds for the 2015 USL season. Prior to signing with Pittsburgh, Molota had a stint with United FC of the National First Division in his native South Africa. Only days after signing for the club, Moloto scored the game-winning goal of a 2–0 victory over the Western Illinois Leathernecks of Western Illinois University in the Riverhounds' first preseason match of 2015. Moloto made his league debut for the Riverhounds on 28 March 2015 in the club's opening match of the 2015 season, a 5–2 victory over the Harrisburg City Islanders. He started the match for the club and provided an assist on Kevin Kerr's second goal before being subbed off for Max Touloute in the 77th minute. Moloto scored his first competitive goal for the club in a U.S. Open Cup match against the West Virginia Chaos on 20 May 2015. Three days later, he scored his first league goal in a 2–1 victory over the Richmond Kickers. On 30 May 2015, the Riverhounds played what one columnist called the "club’s greatest ever game" as the team scored three goals in stoppage time for a 6–5 victory over the Harrisburg City Islanders. In the match, Moloto became the first player to tally three assists in a single match in league history. The match's eleven total goals set a league regular season record for combined goals in a match. Moloto finished the season with 6 goals and 7 assists in 24 league appearances, ranked third on the team in goals and second in assists and included a goal in each of the final two matches of the season which saw Pittsburgh qualify for the playoffs. For his efforts, he was named the USL Player of the Week for Week 27. In October 2015, the Riverhounds announced that Moloto was still under contract with the team for the 2016 season.

Moloto scored the Riverhounds' first goal of the 2016 season as he recorded the first tally of a 2–1 preseason victory over the Penn State Nittany Lions on 28 February 2016.

On 12 December 2017, Nashville SC announced they had acquired Moloto in a trade with Swope Park. The club announced that Moloto would wear the number 10 shirt for the 2018 season.

On 2 January 2020, Moloto joined USL Championship side FC Tulsa. Tulsa and Moloto failed to agree terms on a new deal, and he left the club following the 2022 season.

=== International ===
Moloto has represented South Africa at the Under-17 level, including being named to the squad for a friendly match against Zimbabwe Under-17 in June 2008 in preparation for the 2009 African U-17 Championship. In 2007, South Africa reached the final of the 2007 COSAFA Youth Championship after Moloto scored the only goal of a 1–0 victory over Malawi Under-17 in the semi-finals.
