= Liam Doyle (footballer) =

Manx association football player (born 1992)

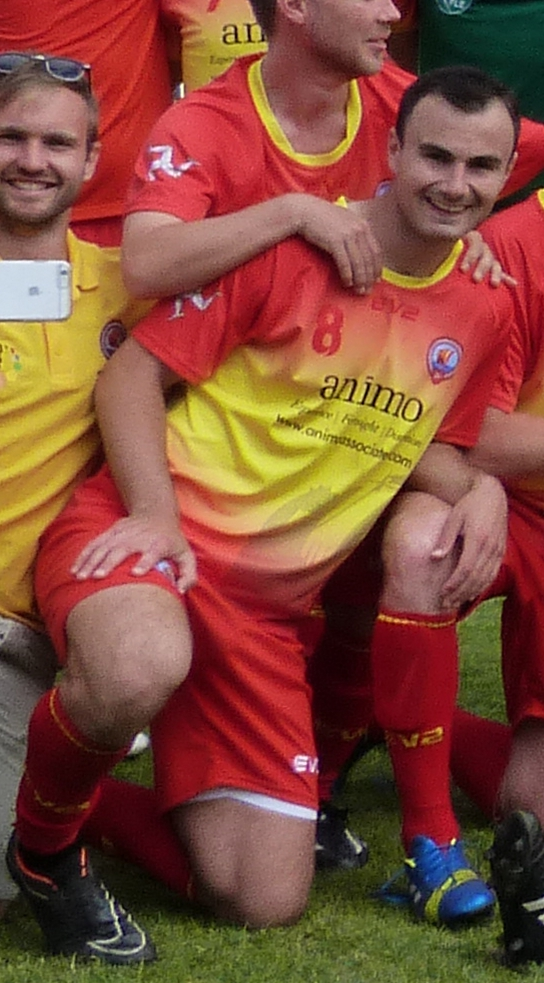
- Liam Doyle with Ellan Vannin national team in 2015

Personal information
- Date of birth: 1 July 1992 (age 34)
- Place of birth: Isle of Man
- Height: 1.92 m (6 ft 4 in)
- Position: Defender

Youth career
- 2005–2014: St. Marys

College career
Years	Team	Apps	(Gls)
2012–2014	Cincinnati State Surge	39	(18)
2014–2015	Ohio State Buckeyes	45	(7)

Senior career*
Years	Team	Apps	(Gls)
2016	Harrisburg City Islanders	32	(0)
2017	Swope Park Rangers	18	(2)
2018–2019	Nashville SC	54	(1)
2019–2020	Memphis 901	21	(1)
2020–2021	San Antonio FC	14	(0)
2021	→ Indy Eleven (loan)	3	(0)
2022	LA Galaxy II	33	(0)
Total		175	(4)

International career
2010	Isle of Man	4	(0)
2014–2016	Ellan Vannin	12	(1)
- * Club domestic league appearances and goals as of 20:59, 23 October 2022 (UTC)

Liam Doyle (born 1 July 1992) is a Manx former professional footballer who played as a defender. Doyle is currently the Director of Soccer Operations for MLS club Nashville SC.

Liam was formally drafted by D.C. United in the 2016 MLS SuperDraft.

Liam is also a United States Green Card holder.

== Career ==
=== Youth and college ===
Doyle played soccer at Cincinnati State Technical and Community College in 2012 and 2013, before transferring to Ohio State University in 2014, where he stayed for two years.

=== Professional ===
Doyle has played for St Marys on his native Isle of Man. The team competes in the Isle of Man Football League. On 19 January 2016, Doyle was selected 67th overall in the 2016 MLS SuperDraft by DC United. However, after trialling with the club he was not signed.

Doyle signed with United Soccer League side Harrisburg City Islanders in April 2016 and made his debut as a late substitute on 2 April 2016 against Charlotte Independence.

Doyle moved to USL side Swope Park Rangers on 6 December 2016.

Doyle was signed by USL side Nashville SC on 14 December 2017.

Following a mutual termination of his contract with Nashville, Doyle subsequently joined USL side Memphis 901.

On 18 September 2020, Doyle moved to USL Championship side San Antonio FC for the remainder of the season.

On 13 September 2021, Doyle joined Indy Eleven on loan for the remainder of the season.

Following his release from San Antonio, Doyle signed with USL Championship side LA Galaxy II on 3 March 2022.

Doyle announced his retirement from professional football on 18 November 2022.

=== International ===
Doyle was called up to the Isle of Man national team for the first time in 2010.

== Post-playing career ==
On 14 December 2022, it was announced that Doyle had been named Director of Soccer Operations at MLS Next Pro side Huntsville City FC ahead of their inaugural season.
