= Tucker Hume =

American soccer player (born 1993)

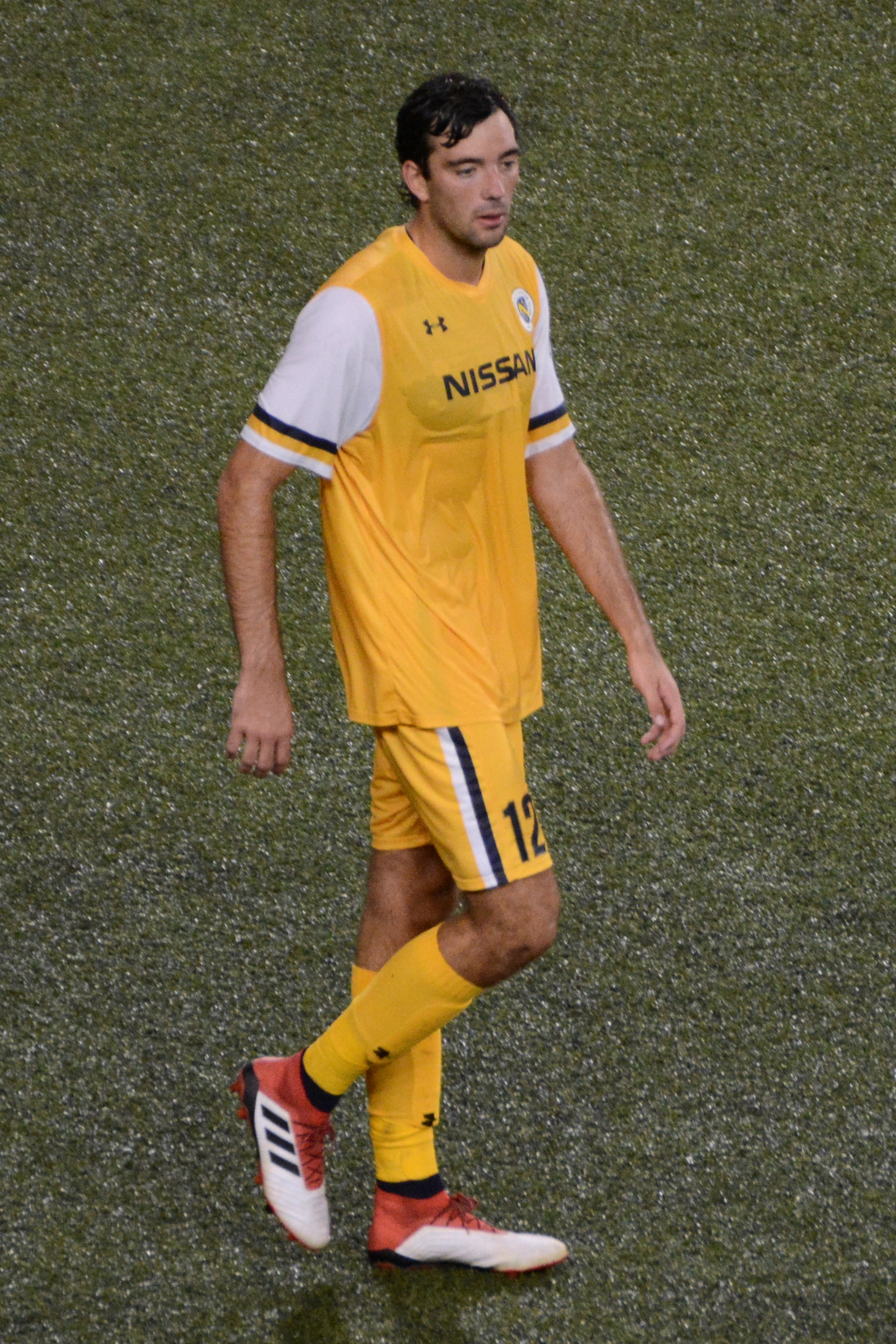
- Hume with Nashville SC in 2018

Personal information
- Date of birth: August 22, 1993 (age 33)
- Place of birth: Dallas, Texas, United States
- Height: 6 ft 5 in (1.96 m)
- Position: Forward

Youth career
- Westlake Chaparrals

College career
Years	Team	Apps	(Gls)
2012–2013	Rollins Tars	31	(14)
2014–2016	North Carolina Tar Heels	40	(18)

Senior career*
Years	Team	Apps	(Gls)
2013	Austin Aztex	13	(3)
2014–2015	Midland-Odessa FC	16	(5)
2016	Portland Timbers U23s	2	(1)
2017	Ottawa Fury	23	(3)
2018–2019	Nashville SC	33	(8)
- * Club domestic league appearances and goals as of October 23, 2019

Tucker Hume (born August 22, 1993) is an American soccer forward. He has a twin brother Walker Hume.

== Playing career ==
In February 2017, Hume signed with Ottawa Fury FC in the United Soccer League.

On December 14, 2017, Hume signed with Nashville SC in the USL.
