= Ropapa Mensah =

Ghanaian footballer (born 1997)

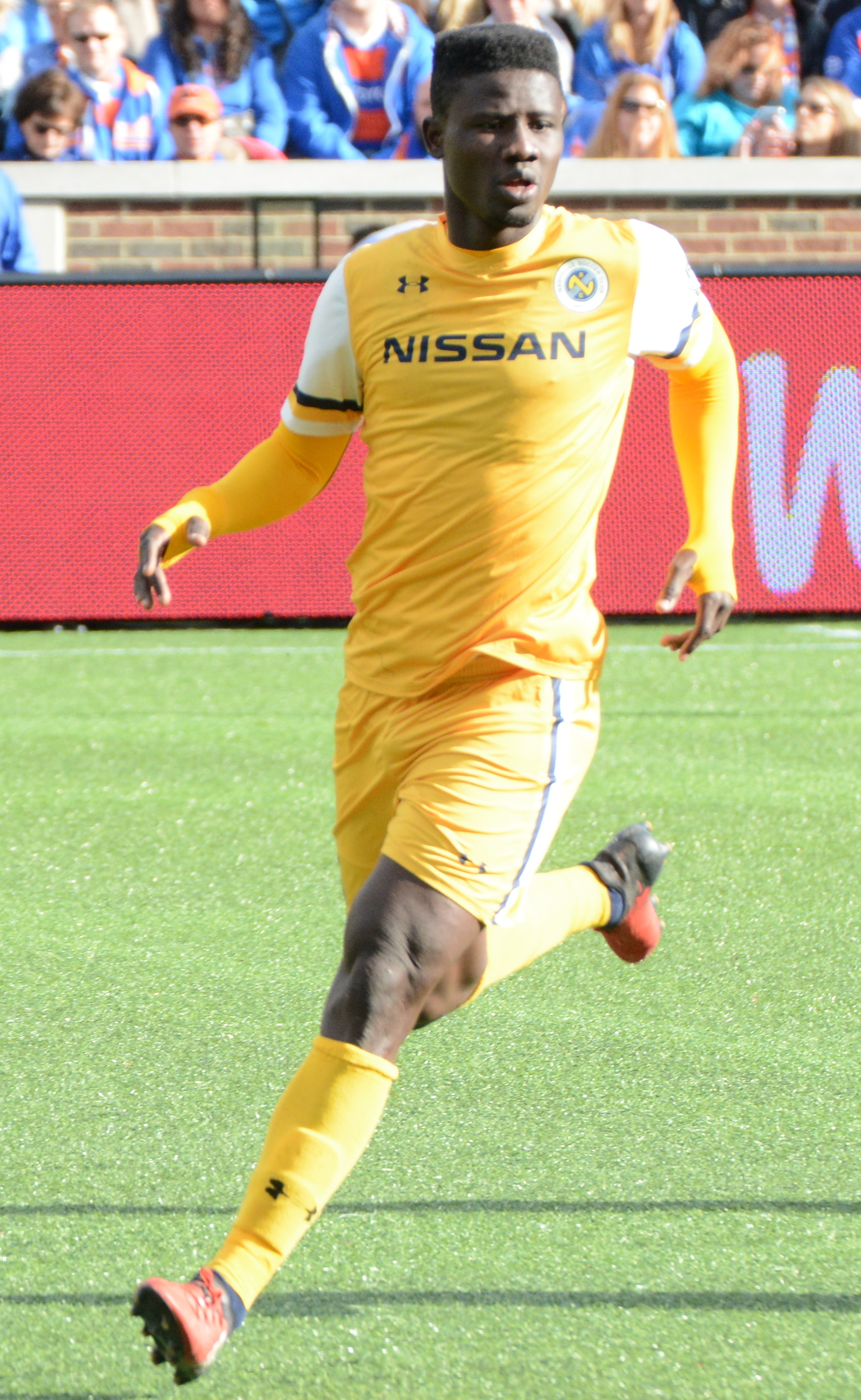
- Mensah with Nashville in 2018

Personal information
- Full name: Ropapa Kwamina Mensah
- Date of birth: 20 August 1997 (age 29)
- Place of birth: Accra, Ghana
- Height: 1.85 m (6 ft 1 in)
- Position: Forward

Team information
- Current team: Chattanooga Red Wolves
- Number: 20

Senior career*
Years	Team	Apps	(Gls)
2016–2019	Inter Allies	19	(3)
2017	→ Harrisburg City Islanders (loan)	19	(7)
2018	→ Nashville SC (loan)	30	(5)
2019	Nashville SC	31	(6)
2020	Pittsburgh Riverhounds	16	(6)
2021	Sporting Kansas City II	14	(0)
2022	Port Fouad SC		
2023–2024	Chattanooga Red Wolves	46	(21)
2025	Greenville Triumph	23	(6)
2026–	Chattanooga Red Wolves	16	(3)
- * Club domestic league appearances and goals as of October 31, 2026

Ropapa Kwamina Mensah (born 20 August 1997) is a Ghanaian professional footballer who plays for Chattanooga Red Wolves in the USL League One.

== Club career ==
Mensah signed with USL Championship side Harrisburg City Islanders on 23 March 2017. For the 2018 season, he moved to another USL team, Nashville SC. On 10 February 2018, he scored the first goal in Nashville SC history, in a friendly against Atlanta United FC.

On November 14, 2018, Nashville announced that they had purchased Mensah from Inter Allies following his season-long loan.

On January 29, 2020, Pittsburgh Riverhounds FC announced that they had signed Mensah to a one-year contract for the 2020 season with an option for the 2021 season.

After spending the 2022 season with Egyptian Second Division side Port Fouad FC, Mensah returned to the United States to sign with USL League One side Chattanooga Red Wolves SC on January 27, 2023.

Mensah joined Greenville Triumph in December 2024.

== International career ==
On November 1, 2019, Mensah was called up to Ghana's U23 squad for the 2019 Africa U-23 Cup of Nations.
