= Michael Reed (soccer) =

American soccer player (born 1987)

Personal information
- Date of birth: October 28, 1987 (age 39)
- Place of birth: Albuquerque, New Mexico, United States
- Height: 6 ft 0 in (1.83 m)
- Position: Midfielder

College career
Years	Team	Apps	(Gls)
2006–2010	New Mexico Lobos		

Senior career*
Years	Team	Apps	(Gls)
2012–2014	Minnesota United FC	31	(1)
2015	Atlanta Silverbacks	29	(1)
2016–2017	San Antonio FC	41	(5)
2018–2019	Nashville SC	51	(2)
2020	Memphis 901	12	(0)

Managerial career
- 2021–2022: Beaman United
- 2021–: Ravenwood Raptors
- * Club domestic league appearances and goals as of October 5, 2020

Michael Reed (born October 28, 1987, in Albuquerque, New Mexico) is an American soccer player.

== Career ==
Reed played his college soccer with the University of New Mexico between 2006 and 2010, before signing his first professional contract with Minnesota Stars FC at the beginning of their 2012 NASL season. At the end of February 2015, Reed signed with NASL club Atlanta Silverbacks in order to help fill out their squad before the 2015 season.

On 10 January 2018, Reed became Nashville SC's first-ever transfer signing when they purchased his contract from San Antonio FC, where he had been the team captain. Reed was named captain for Nashville SC's first ever match, a friendly against Atlanta United on February 10, 2018.

After Nashville made the move to MLS, Reed joined USL Championship side Memphis 901 on January 16, 2020.
