= Daniel Ríos (footballer, born 1995) =

Mexican footballer (born 1995)

Personal information
- Full name: Daniel Armando Ríos Calderón
- Date of birth: 22 February 1995 (age 31)
- Place of birth: Miguel Hidalgo, Mexico City, Mexico
- Height: 1.85 m (6 ft 1 in)
- Position: Forward

Team information
- Current team: CF Montréal
- Number: 14

Youth career
- 2009–2015: Guadalajara

Senior career*
Years	Team	Apps	(Gls)
2015–2018	Guadalajara	0	(0)
2016–2017	→ Coras (loan)	25	(9)
2017	→ Zacatepec (loan)	13	(4)
2018	→ North Carolina FC (loan)	31	(20)
2019–2022	Nashville SC	61	(25)
2022	Charlotte FC	27	(7)
2023–2025	Guadalajara	19	(1)
2024	→ Atlanta United (loan)	27	(7)
2025	→ Vancouver Whitecaps (loan)	31	(3)
2026–	CF Montréal	28	(7)
- * Club domestic league appearances and goals as of 2 March 2026

Daniel Armando Ríos Calderón (Note: In this Spanish name, the first or paternal surname is Ríos and the second or maternal family name is Calderón.) (born 22 February 1995) is a Mexican professional footballer who plays as a forward for Major League Soccer club CF Montréal.

== Career ==
=== Guadalajara ===
Coming up through the Chivas Academy, Ríos made his professional debut in a Copa MX match against Irapuato on 24 February 2015. He spent a couple of seasons with the U-20 and reserve teams at Chivas. Featured for Guadalajara Premier – Chivas reserve team in 2016 and saw action in 16 matches in the Liga Premier – the third tier of Mexican soccer.

Ríos came through the ranks of Mexico's youth national teams. He appeared for Mexico U-20 against the MLS Homegrown team in 2016.

==== Loan At Coras ====
In December 2015, it was announced Ríos was sent out on loan to Ascenso MX club Coras de Tepic in order to gain professional playing experience. He scored a brace on his debut on 8 January 2015 against Murciélagos; the match ended in a 6–0 win. During his time on loan, he featured in 38 matches and played 2,613 minutes in the Ascenso MX – second division of Mexican soccer. The striker has netted 17 goals between Ascenso MX and Copa MX play.

=== North Carolina FC ===
In February 2018, Ríos was loaned to North Carolina FC in USL, after moving to the United States. Ríos finished the 2018 season with 20 goals, which was tied for second in the golden boot race.

=== Nashville SC ===
On 20 November 2018, Nashville SC announced Ríos as their first-ever signing for the 2020 MLS season. Nashville loaned Ríos to USL side Nashville SC for the 2019 season. In his initial season with the club, Ríos was named to the 2019 All-League First Team, notching 20 goals in just 31 matches. On 7 August 2019, Ríos scored a goal in the 56th minute in a 4–0 victory over Hartford Athletic, giving him goals in five consecutive games dating back to 6 July. Less than two weeks later, on 18 August 2019, Ríos scored two goals against the Charlotte Independence to give Nashville a 3–1 win, earning him Man of the Match honors. Playing in Nashville SC's final season in the USL he once again finished second in the golden boot race with 20 goals.

Ríos's 20 goals in the 2019 season, made him the first player in USL history to score 20 goals in multiple seasons.

On 23 September 2020, Ríos scored his first MLS goal on a diving header and Nashville SC beat DC United 1–0. 24 November 2020 Ríos' game-winning goal helped expansion team Nashville SC upset Toronto FC (Reigning Conference Champion) to advance to the Eastern Conference semifinals. Injuries limited the Mexico native's opportunities over the club's first two seasons, with five goals and one assist in 30 appearances (13 starts).

On 15 March 2021, Ríos signed a contract extension] through the 2022 season, with a club option for 2023.

=== Charlotte FC ===
Prior to the 2022 season (25 February 2022) Ríos was traded] to Charlotte FC. He made 30 appearances and scored nine goals in all competitions. On 1 October 2022 Ríos had the best individual performance in Charlotte FC by becoming the first player to score a hat-trick for the club against Philadelphia Union.

On 28 December 2022, Charlotte FC completed the transfer of Ríos to Liga MX side Chivas.

=== Atlanta United ===
On 19 March 2024, Atlanta United FC announced signing Ríos on loan from Liga MX side Guadalajara through the 2024 MLS season. Holding a green card, Ríos will occupy a supplemental roster spot. The Chivas forward will bring nearly 200 professional appearances with him, 19 of which were with Chivas over the past two seasons. Ríos made his debut on 23 March 2024 with 15 minutes of play against Toronto after missing early matches with a calf injury. On 16 April 2024, Ríos saw his first start of the season against Philadelphia Union, logging three shots in the process.

On 17 July 2024, Ríos scored the fastest goal in club in 21 seconds against New York City FC at Mercedes-Benz Stadium.

His seven goals this season and four assists are the second-most on the team, which the Mexican forward has managed to do in only 1321 MLS minutes played.

=== Vancouver Whitecaps FC ===
The Vancouver Whitecaps acquired Ríos on 17 February 2025 on a one-year loan through 2025 from C.D. Guadalajara. The Vancouver Whitecaps have an option to purchase Ríos for an undisclosed fee. Vancouver declined the option.

=== CF Montréal ===
CF Montréal signed Ríos as a free agent on 9 January 2026 on a one-year contract with options for the shortened 2027 season and 2027–28 season.

== Career statistics ==
As of match played 10 May 2025

Appearances and goals by club, season and competition
Club	Season	League			Cup (Note: Includes Copa MX, U.S. Open Cup, Canadian Championship)		Other		Total	
Club	Season	Division	Apps	Goals	Apps	Goals	Apps	Goals	Apps	Goals
Guadalajara	2015	Liga MX	—		3	0	—		3	0
Coras (loan)	2015–16	Ascenso MX	9	4	3	2	—		12	6
Coras (loan)	2016–17	Ascenso MX	16	5	3	2	—		19	7
Coras (loan)	Total		25	9	6	4	—		31	13
Zacatepec (loan)	2017–18	Ascenso MX	13	4	2	0	1	0	16	4
North Carolina FC (loan)	2018	USL	31	20	1	0	—		32	20
Nashville SC	2019	USL	31	20	1	0	2	1	34	21
Nashville SC	2020	MLS	18	4	—		3	1	21	5
Nashville SC	2021	MLS	12	1	—		—		12	1
Nashville SC	Total		61	25	1	0	5	2	67	27
Charlotte FC	2022	MLS	27	7	3	2	—		30	9
Guadalajara	2022–23	Liga MX	14	1	—		—		14	1
Guadalajara	2023–24	Liga MX	5	0	—		—		5	0
Guadalajara	Total		19	1	—		—		19	1
Atlanta United (loan)	2024	MLS	27	7	3	1	7	2	37	10
Vancouver Whitecaps (loan)	2025	MLS	31	3	3	0	9 (Note: Seven appearances in CONCACAF Champions Cup, two appearances and one goal in MLS Cup playoffs)	1	43	4
Career total			234	76	22	7	22	5	278	88

== Honours ==
Guadalajara

- Copa MX: Apertura 2015
- Supercopa MX: 2016

Individual

- USL Championship All League First Team: 2018, 2019
