= Alan Winn =

American soccer player (born 1996)

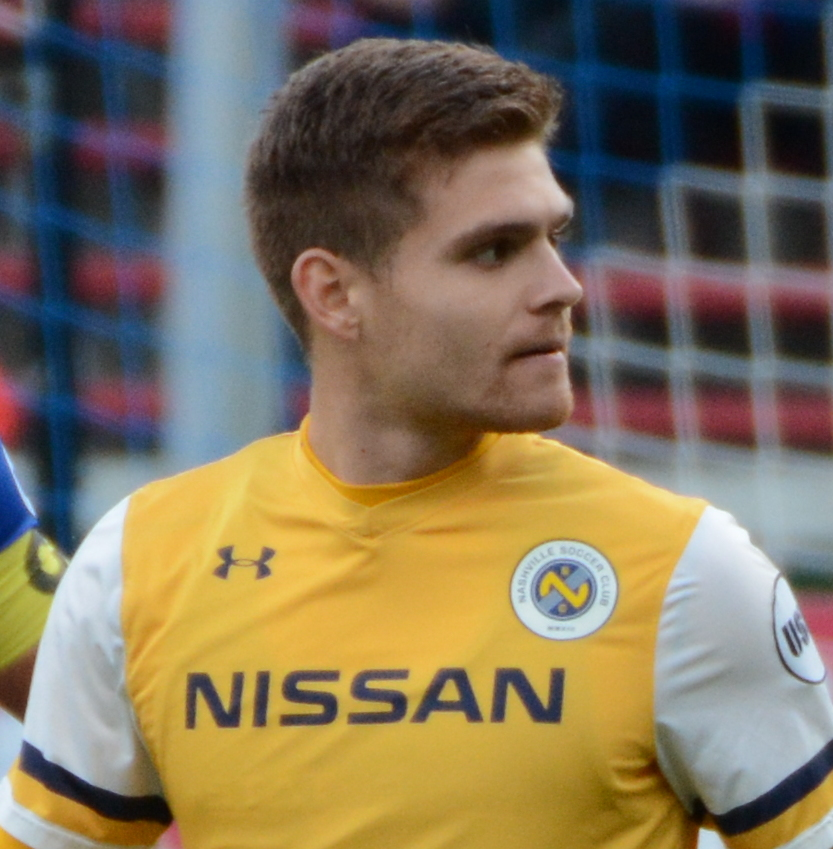
- Winn with Nashville SC in 2018

Personal information
- Date of birth: February 18, 1996 (age 30)
- Place of birth: Dallas, Texas, United States
- Height: 5 ft 11 in (1.80 m)
- Position: Forward

Team information
- Current team: Beaman United
- Number: 20

College career
Years	Team	Apps	(Gls)
2014–2017	North Carolina Tar Heels	77	(23)

Senior career*
Years	Team	Apps	(Gls)
2016	Carolina RailHawks NPSL	3	(1)
2017	Tobacco Road FC	8	(2)
2018–2019	Nashville SC	52	(7)
2020	Nashville SC	7	(0)
2021	Memphis 901	15	(1)
2022–	Beaman United		
- * Club domestic league appearances and goals as of August 7, 2022

Alan Winn (born February 18, 1996) is an American soccer player who currently plays for United Premier Soccer League side Beaman United FC.

== Career ==
=== College and amateur ===
Winn was born in Dallas, Texas and grew up in nearby Garland, Texas. He played his college career at University of North Carolina where he played mainly as a winger or forward. Winn played 77 matches for the Tarheels, starting 62. He scored 23 goals and had 14 assists.

Winn played for National Premier Soccer League side Carolina RailHawks NPSL in 2016 and Premier Development League side Tobacco Road FC in 2017.

Following his release from Memphis, Winn joined Nashville-based United Premier Soccer League club Beaman United FC for the 2022 season.

=== Professional ===
On January 19, 2018, the Colorado Rapids selected Winn with the 25th overall pick of the 2018 MLS SuperDraft.

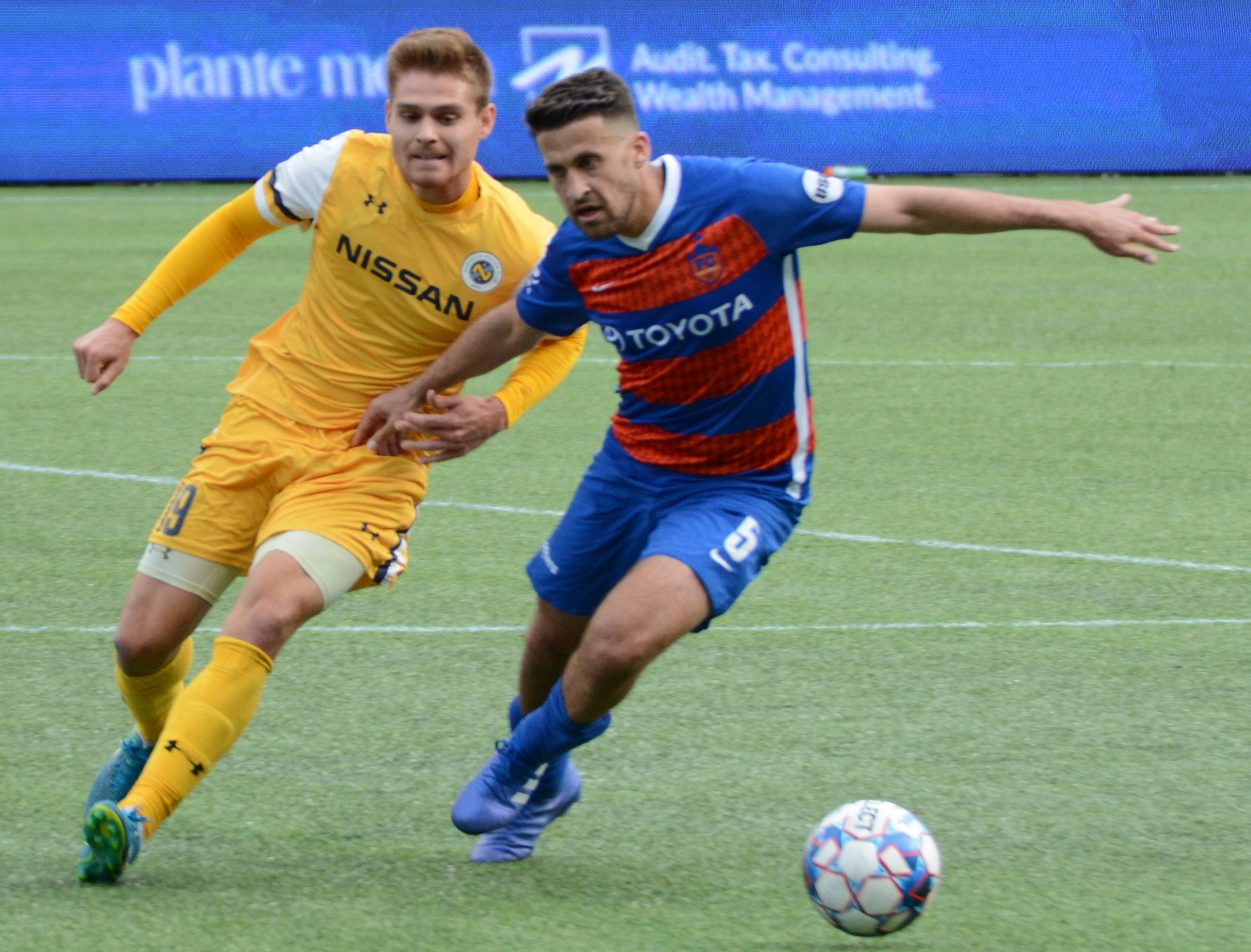
Winn (left) playing for Nashville SC in 2018

On February 9, 2018, Nashville SC announced that Winn had signed with the club. Winn's contract with Nashville expired following the 2020 season.

On August 28, 2021, Winn signed with USL Championship side Memphis 901.
