= 2019 Charleston Battery season =

Charleston Battery
2019 season
- President: Andrew Bell
- Head coach: Michael Anhaeuser
- Stadium: MUSC Health Stadium
- USL Championship: Conference: 9th Overall: 19th
- USL Playoffs: Conference Quarterfinals
- U.S. Open Cup: Second round
- Highest home attendance: League/All: 3,915 (March 9 vs. Ottawa)
- Lowest home attendance: League/All: 1,359 (September 8 vs. Indy 11)
- Average home league attendance: League: 2,424
- Biggest win: 5–1 (October 18 vs. Bethlehem Steel FC)
- Biggest defeat: 0–5 (August 3 vs. Tampa Bay Rowdies)
Home colors	Away colors	Third colors

The 2019 Charleston Battery season was the club's 27th year of existence, their 16th season in the second tier of the United States Soccer Pyramid. It was their ninth season in the United Soccer League Championship as part of the Eastern Conference.

== Roster ==
As of March 22, 2019

Note: Flags indicate national team as defined under FIFA eligibility rules; some limited exceptions apply. Players may hold more than one non-FIFA nationality.

No.	Pos.	Nation	Player
0	GK	USA	Phil Breno
1	GK	USA	Joe Kuzminsky
2	DF	USA	Jay Bolt
3	DF	USA	Kyle Nelson
4	DF	USA	Taylor Mueller
6	DF	TTO	Leland Archer
7	DF	JAM	O'Brian Woodbine
8	FW	PAN	Romario Piggott
9	FW	USA	Ian Svantesson
10	MF	TTO	Ataullah Guerra
11	MF	BER	Zeiko Lewis
12	MF	COL	Vincenzo Candela
13	MF	USA	Nico Rittmeyer
14	DF	USA	Jarad van Schaik
16	GK	USA	Robert Beebe
19	MF	USA	Dante Marini
20	DF	GRN	A. J. Paterson
21	MF	HON	Angelo Kelly
22	MF	CMR	Brian Anunga
25	MF	JPN	Kotaro Higashi
26	MF	TTO	Kierron Mason
27	FW	RSA	Arthur Bosua
29	FW	JAM	Nicque Daley
30	MF	USA	James Cox

USL Academy player

== Competitions ==
=== Exhibitions ===
Preseason schedule released on January 31.

February 10 Preseason	Charleston Battery	–	College of Charleston Cougars	Charleston, South Carolina
10:00 AM
Note: Result not published

February 16 CCC	Charleston Battery	1–2	FC Cincinnati	Charleston, South Carolina
7:30 PM	Svantesson 52' (pen.)	Report	Adi 2'; Mattocks 57' (pen.)	Stadium: MUSC Health Stadium

February 20 CCC	Charleston Battery	1–1	Columbus Crew SC	Charleston, South Carolina
5:00 PM	Svantesson 25'; Anunga (yellow card) 35'	Report	Robinho 45+2'	Stadium: MUSC Health Stadium

February 23 CCC	Charleston Battery	0–1	Chicago Fire SC	Charleston, South Carolina
7:30 PM		Report	Schweinsteiger (yellow card) 62'; Herbers 85'	Stadium: MUSC Health Stadium

February 27 Preseason	Charleston Battery	4–0	Coastal Carolina Chanticleers	Charleston, South Carolina
7:00 PM	Lewis 4', 87'; Rittmeyer 13'; Beebe (red card) 26'; Marini 75'	Report		Stadium: MUSC Health Stadium

March 2 Preseason	North Carolina FC	Cancelled	Charleston Battery	Cary, North Carolina
2:00 PM		Report		Stadium: WakeMed Soccer Park
Note: Cancelled due to inclement weather.

=== USL Championship ===
==== Standings ====
Pos	Team	Pld	W	D	L	GF	GA	GD	Pts	Qualification
7	North Carolina FC	34	16	8	10	57	37	+20	56	Play-In Round
8	Ottawa Fury FC	34	14	10	10	50	43	+7	52	Play-In Round
9	Charleston Battery	34	11	13	10	44	44	0	46	Play-In Round
10	Birmingham Legion FC	34	12	7	15	35	51	−16	43	Play-In Round
11	Saint Louis FC	34	11	9	14	40	41	−1	42	

Source: USL Championship Standings
Rules for classification: 1) total wins; 2) total goal differential; 3) total goals scored; 4) points earned against top four Conference finishers; 5) disciplinary points; 6) coin toss or drawing of lots

==== Results by round ====
Round	1	2	3	4	5	6	7	8	9	10	11	12	13	14	15	16	17	18	19	20	21	22	23	24	25	26	27	28	29	30	31	32	33	34
Stadium	H	H	A	H	A	H	A	H	H	A	H	A	H	A	H	A	H	A	H	A	A	H	A	A	H	A	A	H	A	H	A	A	H	H
Result	D	W	D	W	L	W	W	D	D	L	D	L	W	D	D	L	D	L	W	W	D	L	D	W	L	L	D	W	L	W	D	D	L	W

A = Away; H = Home; W = Win; D = Draw; L = Loss; P = Postponed

=== Regular season ===
On December 19, 2018, the USL announced their 2019 season schedule.

Win Draw Loss

All times are in Eastern Time Zone.

March 9 1	Charleston Battery	1–1	Ottawa Fury FC	Charleston, South Carolina
7:30 PM	Anunga (yellow card) 62'; Svantesson 65'	Report	Oliviera 5'; Obasi (yellow card) 53'	Stadium: MUSC Health Stadium; Attendance: 3,915; Referee: Sergii Demianchuk

March 16 2	Charleston Battery	2–1	Hartford Athletic	Charleston
7:30 PM	Lewis 17'; Woodbine (yellow card) 49'; Marini 73', (yellow card) 90'	Report	Rasmussen (yellow card) 53', (goal) 83' (pen.)	Stadium: MUSC Health Stadium; Attendance: 2,044; Referee: Rosendo Mendoza

March 30 3	North Carolina FC	1–1	Charleston Battery	Cary, North Carolina
7:00 PM	da Luz (yellow card) 45+1'; Brotherton (yellow card) 78'; McCabe 90+3'	Report	Svantesson 69'; Candela (yellow card) 81'; Bolt (yellow card) 90'	Stadium: Sahlen's Stadium at WakeMed Soccer Park; Referee: Elvis Osmanovic

April 7 4	Charleston Battery	2–0	Charlotte Independence	Charleston
2:00 PM EDT	Svantesson 21'; Lewis 71'	Report	Martínez (yellow card) 18'; Hill (yellow card) 27'	Stadium: MUSC Health Stadium; Attendance: 2,210; Referee: Matt Franz

April 13 5	Bethlehem Steel FC	3–1	Charleston Battery	Chester, Pennsylvania
7:30 PM	Ofeimu (yellow card) 31'; Przybyłko 44', 70'; Fabinho 67', (yellow card) 81'; Turner (yellow card) 90+1'	Report	Kelly-Rosales (yellow card) 42'; Anunga 69'	Stadium: Talen Energy Stadium; Attendance: 1,003; Referee: Yusri Rudolf

April 20 6	Charleston Battery	3–1	Nashville SC	Charleston
7:30 PM EDT	van Schaik 14', 73'; Woodbine (yellow card) 57'; Bosua 64'; Candela (yellow card) 77'	Report	Bourgeois (yellow card) 38'; Reed (yellow card) 45+3'; King (yellow card) 68'; Davis (yellow card) 83'; Ríos 89' (pen.)	Stadium: MUSC Health Stadium; Attendance: 2,776; Referee: Kevin Broadley

April 27 7	Memphis 901 FC	0–1	Charleston Battery	Memphis, Tennessee
7:00 PM	Lindley (yellow card) 24'	Preview	Candela (yellow card) 26'; Marini 90+3'	Stadium: AutoZone Park; Attendance: 7,871; Referee: Dejan Susak

May 4 8	Charleston Battery	2–2	Pittsburgh Riverhounds SC	Charleston
7:30 PM EDT	Anunga (yellow card) 14'; Woodbine (yellow card) 44' van Schaik (yellow card) 45'; Piggott (yellow card) 45+1'; Lewis 76' (pen.); Bosua (yellow card) 79'; Daley 81'	Report	Kerr 5'; Forbes 12'; Greenspan (yellow card) 37'	Stadium: MUSC Health Stadium; Attendance: 1,661; Referee: Gustavo Solorio

May 11 9	Charleston Battery	0–0	Saint Louis FC	Charleston
7:30 PM EDT	Piggott (yellow card) 51'; Candela (yellow card) 55'; Nelson (yellow card) 63'; Mueller (yellow card) 90+3'	Report	Bahner (yellow card) 24'; Umar (yellow card) 89'	Stadium: MUSC Health Stadium; Attendance: 1,879; Referee: Luis Guardia

May 18 10	Indy Eleven	1–0	Charleston Battery	Indianapolis, Indiana
7:00 PM EDT	Pasher (yellow card) 51', (goal) 84'; Kelly (yellow card) 67'	Report	Mason (yellow card) 89'	Stadium: Lucas Oil Stadium; Attendance: 9,259; Referee: Lukasz Szpala

May 25 11	Charleston Battery	1–1	Atlanta United 2	Charleston
7:30 PM EDT	Lewis 79'; Marini (yellow card) 82'	Report	Kissiedou (yellow card) 59', (goal) 71'; Campbell (yellow card) 67'; Wyke (yellow card) 90'	Stadium: MUSC Health Stadium; Attendance: 2,854; Referee: Matthew Thompson

June 1 12	Louisville City FC	4–1	Charleston Battery	Louisville, Kentucky
7:00 PM EDT	Davis 3'; Rasmussen 21' (pen.); Jimenez (yellow card) 49'; Craig (yellow card) 67' (yellow-red card) 90+2'; Marini 74' (o.g.); Ownby (red card) 79'; McCabe 87'	Report	Mason (red card) 19'; Bosua 50'; Van Schaik (yellow card) 86'; Piggott (yellow card) 90'	Stadium: Louisville Slugger Field; Attendance: 8,369; Referee: Elvis Osmanovic

June 8 13	Charleston Battery	3–1	Birmingham Legion FC	Charleston
7:30 PM EDT	Piggott 25'; Daley (yellow card) 66'; Bosua 75' (pen.); Rittmeyer (yellow card) 81'; Paterson 90+3'	Report	Lopez 44'; Johnson (yellow card) 56'; Appiah (yellow card) 65'	Stadium: MUSC Health Stadium; Attendance: 3,456; Referee: Daniel Gutierrez

June 15 14	Tampa Bay Rowdies	1–1	Charleston Battery	St. Petersburg, Florida
19:30 EST (UTC−5)	Guenzatti 39', (yellow card) 58'; Oduro (yellow card) 86'	Report	Nelson (yellow card) 29'; Svantesson 88'; Rittmeyer (yellow card) 90'	Stadium: Al Lang Stadium; Attendance: 5,082; Referee: Michael Radchuk

June 22 15	Charleston Battery	1–1	Swope Park Rangers	Charleston
7:30 PM	Piggott 62'; Svantesson (red card) 90+3'	Report	Segbers (yellow card) 11'; Zendejas (yellow card) 45+2' (yellow-red card) 90+4'; Mbekeli (yellow card) 59'; Hernandez 82'	Stadium: MUSC Health Stadium; Attendance: 1,782; Referee: Matt Franz

June 26 16	Ottawa Fury FC	3–2	Charleston Battery	Ottawa, Ontario
19:00 EST (UTC–5)	Haworth 29', 74'; Fall (yellow card) 60'; Samb 86'	Report	Candela 20'; Lewis 84'	Stadium: TD Place Stadium; Referee: Fabrizio Stasolla

June 29 17	Charleston Battery	1–1	New York Red Bulls II	Charleston
7:30 PM	Mueller (yellow card) 22'; Anunga (red card) 45'; Daley 54'; Candela (yellow card) 85'	Report	Jørgenson 80'; Kilwien (yellow card) 83'; Rito (yellow card) 90+4'	Stadium: MUSC Health Stadium; Attendance: 1,712; Referee: Sergii Demianchuk

July 5 18	Atlanta United 2	P–P	Charleston Battery	Kennesaw, Georgia
7:30 PM				Stadium: Fifth Third Bank Stadium; Referee: Elijio Arreguin
Note: Match postponed due to inclement weather

July 13 19	Charleston Battery	P–P	Memphis 901 FC	Charleston
7:30 PM		Report		Stadium: MUSC Health Stadium; Referee: Danielle Chesky
Note: Match postponed due to inclement weather

July 20 20	Hartford Athletic	2–3	Charleston Battery	Hartford, Connecticut
7:00 PM EDT	Davey (yellow card) 39'; Wojcik 57'; Jørgenson 65' de Wit (yellow card) 71'; Barrera (yellow card) 90'	Report	Lewis 40'; Bosua (yellow card) 69'; Guerra 79'; Marini 80'	Stadium: Dillon Stadium; Attendance: 3,117; Referee: Adam Kilpatrick

July 27 21	Swope Park Rangers	P–P	Charleston Battery	Kansas City, Kansas
7:00 PM				Stadium: Children's Mercy Park
Note: Match postponed due to team bus accident.

August 3 22	Charleston Battery	0–5	Tampa Bay Rowdies	Charleston
19:30 EST (UTC−5)	Guerra (yellow card) 21' (yellow-red card) 42'; Anunga (yellow card) 31'; Mueller (yellow card) 64'	Report	Mkosana 1', 4', (yellow card) 62'; Johnson 34'; Steinberger 47'; Siaj 82'	Stadium: MUSC Health Stadium; Attendance: 2,640; Referee: Lukasz Szpala

August 10 23	Saint Louis FC	1–1	Charleston Battery	Fenton, Missouri
7:30 PM	Fink 68' (pen.); Kamdem (yellow card) 88'	Report	Candela (yellow card) 3' van Schaik 37', (yellow card) 81'; Svantesson (yellow card) 63'; Anunga (yellow card) 67'; Archer (red card) 80'; Woodbine (yellow card) 81'	Stadium: Toyota Stadium; Attendance: 4,085; Referee: Malik Badawi

August 14 24	Loudoun United FC	1–2	Charleston Battery	Leesburg, Virginia
7:30 PM EDT	Sinclair 78'	Report	Mueller 21' van Schaik (yellow card) 29'; Marini 61'; Woodbine (yellow card) 90+1'	Stadium: Segra Field; Referee: Calin Radosav

August 17 25	Charleston Battery	1–2	Louisville City FC	Charleston
7:30 PM EDT	Guerra 7'; Anunga (yellow card) 41'	Report	Totsch (yellow card) 13'; Rasmussen 30' (pen.), (yellow card) 81'; Williams (yellow card) 67'; McMahon (yellow card) 74'; Davis 88'	Stadium: MUSC Health Stadium; Attendance: 1,972; Referee: Rosendo Mendoza

August 24 26	Nashville SC	2–1	Charleston Battery	Nashville, Tennessee
8:00 PM	Mensah 56'; LaGrassa (yellow card) 65'; Akinyode 90+3'	Report	Higashi 43'; Mueller (yellow card) 60'	Stadium: Nissan Stadium; Attendance: 6,662; Referee: Guido Gonzales Jr.

August 30 27	Charlotte Independence	0–0	Charleston Battery	Matthews, North Carolina
6:00 PM	Mansally (yellow card) 30'; Sabella (yellow card) 55'; George (yellow card) 82'	Report	Lewis (yellow card) 11'; Anunga (yellow card) 47'; Mueller (yellow card) 67'; Bolt (yellow card) 90'	Stadium: Sportsplex at Matthews; Attendance: 1,477; Referee: Elton García

September 2 19	Charleston Battery	P–P	Memphis 901 FC	Charleston
6:00 PM		Report		Stadium: MUSC Health Stadium; Referee: Danielle Chesky
Note: Rescheduled match postponed due to inclement weather on July 13. Postponed further due to evacuation order associated with Hurricane Dorian.

September 8 28	Charleston Battery	1–0	Indy Eleven	Charleston
6:00 PM EDT	Nelson (yellow card) 26' (yellow-red card) 57'; Piggott 42'; Woodbine (yellow card) 90+2'	Report	Gabriel (yellow card) 90+6'	Stadium: MUSC Health Stadium; Attendance: 1,359; Referee: Sergii Demianchuk
Note: Originally scheduled for 7:30pm, September 7.

September 11 21	Swope Park Rangers	0–0	Charleston Battery	Kansas City, Kansas
7:00 PM	Jaylin (yellow card) 74'	Report	Mueller (yellow card) 87'	Stadium: Children's Mercy Park; Attendance: 312; Referee: Brad Jensen
Note: Reschedule of postponed July 27 match.

September 14 29	Pittsburgh Riverhounds SC	1–0	Charleston Battery	Pittsburgh, Pennsylvania
7:00 PM EDT	Dos Santos (yellow card) 34', (goal) 69'; Mertz (yellow card) 83'	Report	Guerra (yellow card) 33'	Stadium: Highmark Stadium; Attendance: 2,658; Referee: Lorant Varga

September 18 18	Atlanta United 2	3–1	Charleston Battery	Kennesaw, Georgia
	Fernando 10'; Bello (yellow card) 48'; Carleton 49'; Conway (yellow card) 62'; Metcalf 74' (pen.); Decas (yellow card) 90+1'	Report	Rittmeyer 26'; Kelly-Rosales (yellow card) 29'; Anunga (yellow card) 67'	Stadium: Fifth Third Bank Stadium; Attendance: 1,476; Referee: Natalie Simon
Note: Reschedule of match postponed on July 5

September 22 30	Charleston Battery	1–0	North Carolina FC	Charleston
14:00 EDT	Anunga 44' van Schaik (yellow card) 89'; Rittmeyer 90+3'	Report	Albadawi 49'; Taylor (yellow card) 64'	Stadium: MUSC Health Stadium; Attendance: 3,039; Referee: Kevin Broadley

September 27 31	New York Red Bulls II	1–1	Charleston Battery	Harrison, New Jersey
7:30 PM	Tolkin (yellow card) 45+6'; Jørgenson 51'; Sowe (yellow card) 85'	Report	Woodbine (yellow card) 40'; Anunga (yellow card) 43'; Guerra (yellow card) 45+2'; Piggott (yellow card) 74'; Paterson 90+6'	Stadium: MSU Soccer Park at Pittser Field; Attendance: 1,493; Referee: Daniel Gutierrez

October 5 32	Birmingham Legion FC	0–0	Charleston Battery	Birmingham, Alabama
8:00 PM	Herivaux (yellow card) 60'; Ugarte (yellow card) 70'; Culbertson (yellow card) 90+1'; Fisher (yellow card) 90+3'	Report	Guerra (yellow card) 53' (yellow-red card) 59'; Paterson (yellow card) 67'	Stadium: BBVA Field; Referee: Mark Allatin

October 13 33	Charleston Battery	1–2	Loudoun United FC	Charleston
2:00 PM	Bosua 6'; Mueller (yellow card) 61'; Woodbine (yellow card) 71'	Report	Ndour 11', 83'	Stadium: MUSC Health Stadium; Attendance: 2,406; Referee: Gabriele Giusti

October 16 19	Charleston Battery	2–0	Memphis 901 FC	Charleston
6:00 PM	Mueller 30'; Lewis (yellow card) 55', (goal) 63'; Kelly-Rosales (yellow card) 90+1'	Report	Burch (yellow card) 48'; Metzger (yellow card) 68'; Collier (yellow card) 81'; Mohamed (yellow card) 86'	Stadium: MUSC Health Stadium; Attendance: 2,206; Referee: Elvis Osmanovic
Note: Reschedule of match twice postponed due to inclement weather.

October 19 34	Charleston Battery	5–1	Bethlehem Steel FC	Charleston
2:00 PM	Bosua 23', 67'; Kelly-Rosales (yellow card) 27'; Higashi (yellow card) 71'; Guerra 74' (pen.); Paterson 81', 84'; Mueller (yellow card) 90+1'	Report	Chambers (yellow card) 21'; Harriel (yellow card) 39'; Cortés (yellow card) 58'; Moumbagna 78'	Stadium: MUSC Health Stadium; Attendance: 3,300; Referee: Jonathan Bilinski

==== USL Cup Playoffs ====
October 23 Play-in Round	Ottawa Fury FC	1–1 (a.e.t.) (4–5 p)	Charleston Battery	Ottawa, Ontario
8:00 PM EST	Samb 40'; Fall (yellow card) 117'	Report	Higashi 27'; Marini (yellow card) 116'; Lewis (yellow card) 117'	Stadium: TD Place Stadium; Attendance: 2,427; Referee: David Barrie
	Penalties
	Fall (penalty scored); Haworth (penalty scored); Barry (penalty scored); Samb (penalty missed); Thiago (penalty scored)		(penalty scored) Lewis; (penalty scored) Bosua; (penalty scored) Marini; (penalty scored) Svantesson; (penalty scored) van Schaik

October 26 Conference Quarterfinals	Nashville SC	3–1	Charleston Battery	Nashville, Tennessee
8:00 PM	Moloto 10'; King (yellow card) 38'; Ríos 43'; Ockford (yellow card) 77'; Davis (yellow card) 85'; Jones 88'	Report	Lewis 35' (pen.)	Stadium: Nissan Stadium; Attendance: 6,253; Referee: Greg Dopka

=== U.S. Open Cup ===
As a member of the USL Championship, the Battery will enter the tournament in the Second Round, to be played May 14–15, 2019

May 15 Second Round	Greenville Triumph SC (South Carolina)	1–2	(South Carolina) Charleston Battery	Greenville, South Carolina
7:00 PM	Clowes (yellow card) 19'; Hemmings 29'	Report	van Schaik (yellow card) 4'; Svantesson 79', 90+1'	Stadium: Legacy Early College Field; Attendance: 1,738; Referee: David Erbacher

May 29 Third Round	Nashville SC (Tennessee)	1–1 (a.e.t.) (0–3 p)	(South Carolina) Charleston Battery	Murfreesboro, Tennessee
7:30 pm CDT	Jones (yellow card) 55'; Belmar 72'; Sparrow (yellow card) 96'; Davis (yellow card) 115'	Report	Daley 24' van Schaik (yellow card) 45+1'; Rittmeyer (yellow card) 106'	Stadium: Dean A. Hayes Stadium; Attendance: 769; Referee: Jared Simons
	Penalties
	Doyle (penalty missed); LaGrassa (penalty missed); Moloto (penalty missed)		Lewis (penalty scored); Archer (penalty scored) van Schaik (penalty missed); Svantesson (penalty scored)

June 13 Fourth Round	Atlanta United (Georgia (U.S. state))	3–1 (a.e.t.)	(South Carolina) Charleston Battery	Kennesaw, Georgia
7:00 PM EDT	Larentowicz (yellow card) 17'; G. Martínez (yellow card) 73'; Williams 79', (yellow card) 98'; Vazquez 110', 120+1'	Report	Svantesson 20'; Bolt (yellow card) 90+4'; Higashi (yellow card) 116'	Stadium: Fifth Third Bank Stadium; Attendance: 0 Referee: Kevin Broadley
Note: Match to be played behind closed doors. Venue was moved due to unplayable field conditions at MUSC Health Stadium on June 11 in Charleston.
