= 2019 Ottawa Fury FC season =

Ottawa Fury FC
2019 season
- President: John Pugh
- Head Coach: Nikola Popovic
- Stadium: TD Place Stadium
- USLC: 8th, East
- USL Playoffs: Play-In Round
- Canadian Championship: Semi-final Round
- Top goalscorer: League: Wal Fall (10); Carl Haworth (10); All: Wal Fall (10); Carl Haworth (10)
- Highest home attendance: League/All: 6,807 (May 8 vs. New York Red Bulls II)
- Lowest home attendance: League/All: 2,427 (October 23 vs. Charleston Battery)
- Average home league attendance: 4,437
- Biggest win: 4–0 (July 20 vs. Swope Park Rangers)
- Biggest defeat: 0–4 (August 30 vs. Pittsburgh Riverhounds SC)
Home colours	Away colours

The 2019 Ottawa Fury FC season was the club's 6th and final season at the professional level and its 3rd and final in the USL Championship before suspending operations.

== Current roster ==
As of July 30, 2019

Note: Flags indicate national team as defined under FIFA eligibility rules; some limited exceptions apply. Players may hold more than one non-FIFA nationality.

No.	Pos.	Nation	Player
1	GK	CAN	Callum Irving
3	DF	CAN	Daniel Kinumbe (on loan from Montreal Impact)
4	DF	CAN	Nana Attakora
5	MF	GER	Wal Fall
6	MF	CAN	Chris Mannella
7	DF	ENG	Onua Obasi
8	MF	CAN	Jérémy Gagnon-Laparé
9	DF	CAN	Carl Haworth
10	MF	CPV	Kévin Oliveira
11	FW	SEN	Samb Mour
12	GK	CAN	David Monsalve
13	MF	CAN	Aidan Daniels (on loan from Toronto FC)
14	MF	ENG	Charlie Ward
15	DF	CAN	Maxim Tissot
16	MF	CAN	Antoine Coupland
17	FW	HAI	Christiano François
19	MF	BRA	Thiago De Freitas
21	GK	CAN	Jordan Tisseur
22	MF	CAN	Jamar Dixon
23	DF	CAN	Jadon Vilfort
26	DF	CAN	Thomas Meilleur-Giguère (on loan from Montreal Impact)
27	MF	CAN	Protais Bumbu Mutambala
31	MF	CAN	Luca Ricci
40	GK	CAN	Jason Beaulieu (on loan from Montreal Impact)
49	DF	CAN	Robert Boskovic (on loan from Toronto FC II)
58	DF	USA	Dakota Barnathan
64	FW	CAN	Shaan Hundal (on loan from Toronto FC II)
90	MF	CAN	Cameron Shaw
92	FW	GUI	Hadji Barry

== Transfers ==
=== In ===
Date	Player	Number	Position	Previous club	Fee/notes
December 3, 2018	(Haiti) Christiano François	17	FW	(United States) Pittsburgh Riverhounds SC	Signed
January 18, 2019	(England) Charlie Ward	14	MF	(United States) San Antonio FC	Signed
January 24, 2019	(Canada) Jadon Vilfort	23	DF		Signed
January 30, 2019	(Germany) Wal Fall	5	MF	(United States) Saint Louis FC	Signed
January 31, 2019	(United States) Dakota Barnathan	58	DF	(United States) Swope Park Rangers	Signed
February 2, 2019	(Canada) Luca Ricci	31	MF	(Canada) Montreal Impact Academy	Signed
February 13, 2019	(Brazil) Thiago De Freitas	19	MF	(Portugal) Cova da Piedade	Signed
February 13, 2019	(Senegal) Mour Samb	11	FW	(Norway) Tromsø	Signed
February 21, 2019	(Canada) Jordan Tisseur	21	GK	(Canada) Montreal Impact Academy	Signed
March 14, 2019	(Canada) Callum Irving	1	GK	(Canada) Ottawa Fury	Re-Signed
April 20, 2019	(Canada) Protais Bumbu Mutambala	27	MF	(Canada) Longueuil	Signed
July 3, 2019	(Canada) Antoine Coupland	16	MF	(Canada) Ottawa St. Anthony	Signed
July 3, 2019	(Canada) Cameron Shaw	90	MF		Signed
July 30, 2019	(Guinea) Hadji Barry	92	FW	(Israel) Ironi Kiryat Shmona	Signed

=== Out ===
Date	Player	Number	Position	New club	Fee/notes
October 23, 2018	(Canada) Clément Bayiha	31	DF	(Canada) Montreal Impact	Released
October 23, 2018	(Canada) Maxime Crépeau	16	GK	(Canada) Vancouver Whitecaps FC	End of Loan
October 23, 2018	(Cape Verde) Steevan Dos Santos	8	FW	(United States) Pittsburgh Riverhounds SC	Released
October 23, 2018	(Canada) David Edgar	20	DF		Released
October 23, 2018	(Canada) Daniel Haber	11	FW		Released
October 23, 2018	(Canada) Callum Irving	1	GK		Released
October 23, 2018	(Uganda) Azake Luboyera	17	FW		Released
October 23, 2018	(Angola) Sergio Manesio	6	MF/DF		Released
October 23, 2018	(Spain) Cristian Portilla	80	MF	(Lithuania) Žalgiris	Released
October 23, 2018	(Canada) Adonijah Reid	30	FW	(France) Le Havre II	Released
October 23, 2018	(Haiti) Jimmy-Shammar Sanon	24	FW		Released
October 23, 2018	(Panama) Tony Taylor	99	FW	(Hungary) Puskás Akadémia	Released
October 23, 2018	(Canada) Gabriel Wiethaeuper-Balbinotti	14	FW		Released
February 2, 2019	(Canada) Eddie Edward	3	DF		Retired

=== Loan In ===
Date	Player	Number	Position	Previous club	Fee/notes
February 2, 2019	(Canada) Thomas Meilleur-Giguère	26	DF	(Canada) Montreal Impact	Season loan
February 13, 2019	(Canada) Daniel Kinumbe	3	DF	(Canada) Montreal Impact	Season loan
March 6, 2019	(Canada) Robert Boskovic	49	DF	(Canada) Toronto FC II	On Loan
March 6, 2019	(Canada) Aidan Daniels	13	MF	(Canada) Toronto FC	On Loan
March 6, 2019	(Canada) Shaan Hundal	64	FW	(Canada) Toronto FC II	On Loan
July 28, 2019	(Canada) Jason Beaulieu	40	GK	(Canada) Montreal Impact	On Loan

== Competitions ==
=== Preseason ===
Preseason scheduled announced on January 28, 2019.

February 9, 2019 Friendly	Ottawa Fury FC	2–1	Carleton Ravens	Ottawa, ON
9:15 EST		Report		Stadium: Ottawa U

February 16, 2019 Friendly	Soccer Club Mistral De Sherbrooke	0–4	Ottawa Fury FC	Gatineau, QC
21:00 EST		Report		Stadium: Branchaud-Brière

February 23, 2019 Friendly	Philadelphia Union	2–1	Ottawa Fury FC	St. Petersburg, FL
14:00 EST	Przybyłko 40'; Picault 65' (pen.)	Report	François 21'	Stadium: Al Lang Stadium

March 2, 2019 Friendly	Ottawa Fury FC	2–4	Fimleikafélag Hafnarfjarðar	Bradenton, FL
17:30 EST	François 30'; Haworth 57'	Report	Thomsen 25'; Olsen 45'; Thomsen 63'; Gudnason 90+'	Stadium: IMG Academy

=== USL Championship ===
==== Eastern Conference standings ====
Pos	Team	Pld	W	D	L	GF	GA	GD	Pts	Qualification
6	New York Red Bulls II	34	17	6	11	74	51	+23	57	Conference Quarterfinals
7	North Carolina FC	34	16	8	10	57	37	+20	56	Play-In Round
8	Ottawa Fury FC	34	14	10	10	50	43	+7	52	Play-In Round
9	Charleston Battery	34	11	13	10	44	44	0	46	Play-In Round
10	Birmingham Legion FC	34	12	7	15	35	51	−16	43	Play-In Round

Source: USL Championship Standings
Rules for classification: 1) total wins; 2) total goal differential; 3) total goals scored; 4) points earned against top four Conference finishers; 5) disciplinary points; 6) coin toss or drawing of lots

==== Results summary ====
Overall								Home						Away					
Pld	W	D	L	GF	GA	GD	Pts	W	D	L	GF	GA	GD	W	D	L	GF	GA	GD
34	14	10	10	50	43	+7	52	10	5	2	28	16	+12	4	5	8	22	27	−5

Last updated: 19 October 2019.
Source: Match reports

==== Results by round ====
Round	1	2	3	4	5	6	7	8	9	10	11	12	13	14	15	16	17	18	19	20	21	22	23	24	25	26	27	28	29	30	31	32	33	34
Ground	A	A	H	H	A	H	H	H	A	A	H	A	H	A	H	A	A	H	H	A	H	A	H	H	A	A	A	H	H	A	H	A	H	A
Result	D	W	L	W	L	W	D	W	W	D	W	D	D	D	W	L	D	D	W	L	D	W	W	L	L	L	L	W	W	L	W	W	D	L
Position	9	5	13	10	13	8	9	9	6	7	4	7	7	7	6	6	7	7	6	7	8	8	8	8	8	8	8	8	8	8	8	8	8	8

Updated to match(es) played on October 19, 2019. Source: Match reports
A = Away; H = Home; W = Win; D = Draw; L = Loss

==== Match reports ====
Schedule announced on January 3, 2019.

9 March 2019 1	Charleston Battery	1–1	Ottawa Fury FC	Charleston, SC
19:30 EST (UTC–5)	Anunga (yellow card) 62'; Svantesson 65'	Report	Oliviera 5'; Obasi (yellow card) 53'	Stadium: MUSC Health Stadium; Attendance: 3,915; Referee: Sergii Demianchuk

16 March 2019 2	Birmingham Legion FC	0–1	Ottawa Fury FC	Birmingham, AL
20:00 EST (UTC–5)	Lopez (yellow card) 38'; Culbertson (yellow card) 78'	Report	Haworth 16', (yellow card) 79'	Stadium: BBVA Compass Field; Attendance: 4,234; Referee: Thomas Snyder

6 April 2019 3	Ottawa Fury FC	0–3	Nashville SC	Ottawa, ON
14:00 EST (UTC–5)	Gagnon-Laparé (yellow card) 26'; Mannella (yellow card) 90+3'	Report	Ríos 33', 80'; Hume 67'; Moloto (yellow card) 69'	Stadium: TD Place Stadium; Attendance: 6,543; Referee: Matt Souare

13 April 2019 4	Ottawa Fury FC	2–0	Loudoun United FC	Ottawa, ON
14:00 EST (UTC–5)	Samb 34'; Oliveira 52', (yellow card) 72'	Report	S. Bustamante (yellow card) 36'; Verfurth (yellow card) 87'	Stadium: TD Place Stadium; Attendance: 3,232; Referee: David Barrie

20 April 2019 5	Louisville City FC	1–0	Ottawa Fury FC	Louisville, KY
19:00 EST (UTC–5)	Mkosana 60'	Report		Stadium: Louisville Slugger Field; Attendance: 7,110; Referee: Farhad Dadkho

28 April 2019 6	Ottawa Fury FC	2–0	Atlanta United 2	Ottawa, ON
14:00 EST (UTC–5)	François 40'; Meilleur-Giguère 67'	Report		Stadium: TD Place Stadium; Attendance: 3,691; Referee: Pierre-Luc Lauziere

8 May 2019 8	Ottawa Fury FC	1–1	New York Red Bulls II	Ottawa, ON
10:30 EST (UTC–5)	Fall 6'; Oliviera (yellow card) 22'; Ward (yellow card) 39'; Barnathan (yellow card) 90+2'	Report	Koffi (yellow card) 20'; Rito (yellow card) 79'; Stroud 90+2'; Mines (yellow card) 90+3'	Stadium: TD Place Stadium; Attendance: 6,807; Referee: Yusri Rudolf

12 May 2019 9	Ottawa Fury FC	2–1	North Carolina FC	Ottawa, ON
14:00 EST (UTC–5)	Samb 41', (yellow card) 42'; Oliviera 70'	Report	Smith (yellow card) 13'; Miller 66'; Brotherton (yellow card) 74'	Stadium: TD Place Stadium; Attendance: 3,551; Referee: Fabrizio Stasolla

19 May 2019 10	Bethlehem Steel FC	0–3	Ottawa Fury FC	Chester, PA
18:00 EST (UTC–5)	Fabinho (yellow card) 14'	Report	François 32'; Fall 57'; Samb 82'	Stadium: Talen Energy Stadium; Attendance: 436; Referee: Sergii Demianchuk

25 May 2019 11	Hartford Athletic	1–1	Ottawa Fury FC	Hartford, CT
19:00 EST (UTC–5)	Martin (yellow card) 45+1'; Dalgaard 47' de Wit (yellow card) 60'	Report	Samb 22'; Fall (yellow card) 49'; Mannella (yellow card) 64'	Stadium: Rentschler Field; Attendance: 5,346; Referee: Lorant Varga

2 June 2019 12	Ottawa Fury FC	4–1	Charlotte Independence	Ottawa, ON
14:00 EST (UTC–5)	Attakora (yellow card) 18'; Mannella (yellow card) 30'; Fall 36', (yellow card) 90+4'; Samb 37', 56'; Obasi (yellow card) 64'; François 89'	Report	Roberts 14', (red card) 80'; Jones (yellow card) 51'; Johnson (red card) 60'; Areman (yellow card) 90+4'	Stadium: TD Place Stadium; Attendance: 3,589; Referee: Matt Souare

8 June 2019 13	Pittsburgh Riverhounds SC	2–2	Ottawa Fury FC	Pittsburgh, PA
19:00 EST (UTC–5)	Kerr 34'; Vancaeyezeele (yellow card) 41'; Dos Santos (yellow card) 58'; Brett 62', (yellow card) 73'	Report	Obasi (yellow card) 45'; Ward (yellow card) 61'; Fall 66' (pen.); Daniels 69'	Stadium: Highmark Stadium; Attendance: 3,019; Referee: Kevin Broadley

15 June 2019 14	Ottawa Fury FC	0–0	Memphis 901 FC	Ottawa, ON
19:00 EST (UTC–5)	Attakora (yellow card) 64'	Report	Charpie (yellow card) 33'	Stadium: TD Place Stadium; Attendance: 4,108; Referee: Serge Topalian

22 June 2019 15	Nashville SC	3–3	Ottawa Fury FC	Nashville, TN
20:00 EST (UTC–5)	Ríos 9'; Mensah 55'; Lancaster 71'	Report	Mannella (yellow card) 37'; Samb (yellow card) 40'; Haworth 45'; François 50'; Fall 81'	Stadium: First Tennessee Park; Attendance: 6,697; Referee: Sergii Demianchuk

26 June 2019 16	Ottawa Fury FC	3–2	Charleston Battery	Ottawa, ON
19:00 EST (UTC–5)	Haworth 29', 74'; Fall (yellow card) 60'; Samb 86'	Report	Candela 20'; Lewis 84'	Stadium: TD Place Stadium; Attendance: 3,094; Referee: Fabrizio Stasolla

29 June 2019 17	Tampa Bay Rowdies	2–1	Ottawa Fury FC	St. Petersburg, FL
20:00 EST (UTC–5)	Oduro (yellow card) 28'; Tejada 36'; Guenzatti (yellow card) 43', (goal) 90+2'	Report	François 22'; Oliveira (yellow card) 53'	Stadium: Al Lang Stadium; Attendance: 5,396; Referee: Greg Dopka

5 July 2019 18	New York Red Bulls II	1–1	Ottawa Fury FC	Montclair, NJ
19:00 EST (UTC–5)	Zajec 54'; Lema (yellow card) 64'; Kilwien (yellow card) 90'; Louro (yellow card) 90+2'	Report	Thiago (yellow card) 11'; Gagnon-Laparé (yellow card) 13' (yellow-red card) 24'; Haworth 20', (yellow card) 44'	Stadium: MSU Soccer Park; Attendance: 812; Referee: Elvis Osmanovic

14 July 2019 19	Ottawa Fury FC	1–1	Louisville City FC	Ottawa, ON
14:00 EST (UTC–5)	Fall 56' (pen.); Meilleur-Giguère (yellow card) 77'; Obasi (yellow card) 90+2'	Report	Rasmussen 67', (yellow card) 81'	Stadium: TD Place Stadium; Attendance: 5,770; Referee: Juan Márquez

20 July 2019 20	Ottawa Fury FC	4–0	Swope Park Rangers	Ottawa, ON
19:00 EST (UTC–5)	Mannella (yellow card) 30'; Oliveira 39'; François 41'; Fall 48' (pen.), (yellow card) 77'; Haworth 57', (yellow card) 79'; Gagnon-Laparé (yellow card) 89'	Report	Allach (yellow card) 74'	Stadium: TD Place Stadium; Attendance: 4,636; Referee: Sebastian Noshinravani

27 July 2019 21	Memphis 901 FC	2–0	Ottawa Fury FC	Memphis, TN
20:00 EST (UTC–5)	Meilleur-Giguère 59' (o.g.); Najem 62'; Paul (yellow card) 90+6'	Report	Oliveira (yellow card) 80'; Haworth (yellow card) 90+4'; Fall (yellow card) 90+6'	Stadium: AutoZone Park; Attendance: 6,614; Referee: Matthew Corrigan

2 August 2019 22	Ottawa Fury FC	0–0	Birmingham Legion FC	Ottawa, ON
19:00 EST (UTC–5)		Report	Lopez (yellow card) 74' (yellow-red card) 78'; Oekel (yellow card) 87'; Asiedu (yellow card) 90+3'	Stadium: TD Place Stadium; Attendance: 4,015; Referee: Mathieu Souaré

17 August 2019 23	Loudoun United FC	1–3	Ottawa Fury FC	Leesburg, VA
19:30 EST (UTC–5)	Wild 1'; Amoh (yellow card) 13'; Hawkins (yellow card) 85'; Sinclair (yellow card) 90+2'	Report	Oliviera 23'; François 30'; Haworth 74'	Stadium: Segra Field; Referee: Lorant Varga

24 August 2019 24	Ottawa Fury FC	2–1	Saint Louis FC	Ottawa, ON
14:00 EST (UTC–5)	Haworth 10'; Barry 34'; Fall (yellow card) 56'; François (yellow card) 90+5'	Report	Umar (yellow card) 14' (yellow-red card) 47'; Kavita (yellow card) 56'; Fink 71' (pen.); Reynolds (yellow card) 87'	Stadium: TD Place Stadium; Attendance: 5,504; Referee: Fabrizio Stasolla

30 August 2019 25	Ottawa Fury FC	0–4	Pittsburgh Riverhounds SC	Ottawa, ON
19:00 EST (UTC–5)		Report	Dos Santos 2'; Brett 11', 34'; Dabo (yellow card) 20'; Kahsai (yellow card) 82', (goal) 86'; Greenspan (yellow card) 84'	Stadium: TD Place Stadium; Attendance: 5,502; Referee: David Barrie

4 September 2019 7	Saint Louis FC	1–0	Ottawa Fury FC	Fenton, MO
20:30 EST (UTC–5)	Abend (yellow card) 35'; Fernandez (yellow card) 63'; Blackwood 80'	Report	Tissot (yellow card) 45+4'; Thiago (yellow card) 88'	Stadium: Toyota Stadium; Attendance: 3,524; Referee: Victor Rivas
Note: Postponed from 4 May due to flooding.

7 September 2019 26	Atlanta United 2	3–2	Ottawa Fury FC	Kennesaw, GA
19:30 EST (UTC–5)	Carleton 1', 72'; Okonkwo 26'; Bashti (yellow card) 70'	Report	Boskovic (yellow card) 23'; Fall 39' (pen.), (yellow card) 89'; Barry 70'	Stadium: Fifth Third Bank Stadium; Attendance: 2,504; Referee: Kevin Broadley

11 September 2019 27	Indy Eleven	2–0	Ottawa Fury FC	Indianapolis, IN
19:00 EST (UTC–5)	Ayoze 6', 55'	Report	Irving (yellow card) 9'; Gagnon-Laparé (yellow card) 30'; Boskovic (yellow card) 45'; Thiago (yellow card) 65'	Stadium: Lucas Oil Stadium; Attendance: 9,047; Referee: Ismir Pekmic

18 September 2019 28	Ottawa Fury FC	1–0	Tampa Bay Rowdies	Ottawa, ON
19:00 EST (UTC–5)	Fall (yellow card) 56' (yellow-red card) 90+2', (goal) 90+1' (pen.); Gagnon-Laparé (yellow card) 62'; Haworth (yellow card) 90+4'	Report	Diakité (yellow card) 56'; McCarthy (yellow card) 90+1'	Stadium: TD Place Stadium; Attendance: 3,200

22 September 2019 29	Ottawa Fury FC	4–1	Hartford Athletic	Ottawa, ON
14:00 EST (UTC–5)	Barry 2' (pen.), 16' (pen.), 66'; François 18'; Mannella (yellow card) 71'	Report	Angulo 65'	Stadium: TD Place Stadium; Attendance: 5,505; Referee: Filip Dujic

28 September 2019 30	North Carolina FC	3–1	Ottawa Fury FC	Cary, NC
TBC EST (UTC–5)	Albadawi (yellow card) 10', (goal) 89'; Guillén (yellow card) 26'; Brotherton 53'; Fortune (yellow card) 63'; Kristo 82', (yellow card) 82'	Report	Thiago 4'; Fall (yellow card) 44'; Gagnon-Laparé (yellow card) 45+2'; Tissot (yellow card) 90+4'	Stadium: Sahlen's Stadium at WakeMed Soccer Park; Attendance: 3,233; Referee: Dejan Susak

2 October 2019 31	Ottawa Fury FC	1–0	Indy Eleven	Ottawa, ON
19:00 EST (UTC–5)	Attakora (yellow card) 11'; Haworth 16', (yellow card) 33'; Oliveira (yellow card) 45+2'; Gagnon-Laparé (yellow card) 61'	Report	Watson (red card) 60'; Ouimette (yellow card) 61'	Stadium: TD Place Stadium; Attendance: 3,145; Referee: Serge Topalian

8 October 2019 32	Swope Park Rangers	1–2	Ottawa Fury FC	Kansas City, KS
20:00 EST (UTC–5)	Akhmatov (yellow card) 24'; Clarke (yellow card) 37' (yellow-red card) 45'; Zé Pedro (yellow card) 50', (goal) 85'; Kuzain (yellow card) 62'	Report	Fall 45+2' (pen.), (yellow card) 57'; Ward (yellow card) 82'; Oliveira 89'	Stadium: Children's Mercy Park; Attendance: 1,565; Referee: Gabriele Giusti

12 October 2019 33	Ottawa Fury FC	1–1	Bethlehem Steel FC	Ottawa, ON
14:00 EST (UTC–5)	Haworth 40'; Ward (yellow card) 90+7'	Report	Kingue (yellow card) 43'; Moumbagna 71'; Zandi (yellow card) 78'	Stadium: TD Place Stadium; Attendance: 5,539; Referee: Myriam Marcotte

19 October 2019 34	Charlotte Independence	3–1	Ottawa Fury FC	Matthews, NC
19:00 EST (UTC–5)	Oduro 12'; Martínez (yellow card) 50', (goal) 89', 90+4'	Report	Attakora (yellow card) 27'; Barry 60'; Barnathan (yellow card) 81' (yellow-red card) 83'	Stadium: Sportsplex at Matthews; Attendance: 1,552; Referee: Thomas Snyder

==== USL Cup Playoffs ====
23 October Play-in Round	Ottawa Fury FC	1–1 (a.e.t.) (4–5 p)	Charleston Battery	Ottawa, ON
8:00 PM EST	Samb 40'; Fall (yellow card) 117'	Report	Higashi 27'; Marini (yellow card) 116'; Lewis (yellow card) 117'	Stadium: TD Place Stadium; Attendance: 2,427; Referee: David Barrie
	Penalties
	Fall (penalty scored); Haworth (penalty scored); Barry (penalty scored); Samb (penalty missed); Thiago (penalty scored)		(penalty scored) Lewis; (penalty scored) Bosua; (penalty scored) Marini; (penalty scored) Svantesson; (penalty scored) van Schaik

=== Canadian Championship ===
==== Third qualifying round ====
10 July 2019 1st leg	HFX Wanderers FC	2–3	Ottawa Fury FC	Halifax, Nova Scotia
18:00 EST (UTC–5)	Perea 32' (pen.), (yellow card) 70'; Garcia (yellow card) 39'; Barnathan 62' (o.g.); Simmons (yellow card) 63'; Bona (yellow card) 72'	Report	De Freitas 23', 35'; Irving (yellow card) 31'; Obasi (yellow card) 58'; Tissot 67'; Barnathan (yellow card) 70'	Stadium: Wanderers Grounds; Attendance: 6,213; Referee: Silviu Petrescu

24 July 2019 2nd leg	Ottawa Fury FC	2–2 (5–4 agg.)	HFX Wanderers FC	Ottawa, Ontario
19:30 EST (UTC–5)	Obasi 45+1'; François 66'; Oliveira (yellow card) 74'; Haworth (yellow card) 80'; Gagnon-Laparé (yellow card) 90+4'	Report	Skublak 30', (yellow card) 86'; Perea 43'; Schaale (yellow card) 74'	Stadium: TD Place Stadium; Attendance: 4,443; Referee: Pierre-Luc Lauzière

==== Semi-finals ====
7 August 2019 1st leg	Ottawa Fury FC	0–2	Toronto FC	Ottawa, Ontario
19:30 EST (UTC–5)	Fall (yellow card) 79'	Report	Morrow (yellow card) 20'; Moor 30'; Zavaleta (yellow card) 48'; Fraser (yellow card) 81'; Endoh 90+1'	Stadium: TD Place Stadium; Attendance: 5,809; Referee: David Barrie

14 August 2019 2nd leg	Toronto FC	3–0 (5–0 agg.)	Ottawa Fury FC	Toronto, Ontario
19:30 EST (UTC–5)	DeLeon 14', 39', (yellow card) 57'; Mullins 37'	Report		Stadium: BMO Field; Attendance: 12,683; Referee: David Gantar

== Statistics ==
=== Appearances and goals ===
No.	Pos	Nat	Player	Total		USLC		USLC Playoffs		Canadian Championship	
No.	Pos	Nat	Player	Apps	Goals	Apps	Goals	Apps	Goals	Apps	Goals
	FW	(Canada) CAN	Shaan Hundal	1	0	1	0	0	0	0	0
	DF	(Democratic Republic of the Congo) COD	Daniel Kinumbe	0	0	0	0	0	0	0	0
1	GK	(Canada) CAN	Callum Irving	36	0	31	0	1	0	4	0
4	DF	(Canada) CAN	Nana Attakora	20	0	18	0	1	0	1	0
5	MF	(Germany) GER	Wal Fall	33	10	29	10	1	0	3	0
6	MF	(Canada) CAN	Chris Mannella	35	0	30	0	1	0	4	0
7	DF	(England) ENG	Onua Obasi	26	1	23	0	1	0	2	1
8	DF	(Canada) CAN	Jérémy Gagnon-Laparé	37	0	32	0	1	0	4	0
9	DF	(Canada) CAN	Carl Haworth	37	10	32	10	1	0	4	0
10	FW	(Cape Verde) CPV	Kevin Oliveira	38	6	33	6	1	0	4	0
11	FW	(Senegal) SEN	Mour Samb	19	8	18	7	1	1	0	0
12	GK	(Canada) CAN	David Monsalve	3	0	3	0	0	0	0	0
13	FW	(Canada) CAN	Aidan Daniels	14	1	14	1	0	0	0	0
14	MF	(England) ENG	Charlie Ward	37	0	32	0	1	0	4	0
15	DF	(Canada) CAN	Maxim Tissot	18	1	15	0	0	0	3	1
16	MF	(Canada) CAN	Antoine Coupland	3	0	3	0	0	0	0	0
17	FW	(Haiti) HAI	Christiano François	33	9	28	8	1	0	4	1
19	MF	(Brazil) BRA	Thiago De Freitas	25	3	20	1	1	0	4	2
20	MF	(United States) USA	Amar Sejdic	3	0	3	0	0	0	0	0
21	GK	(Canada) CAN	Jordan Tisseur	0	0	0	0	0	0	0	0
22	MF	(Canada) CAN	Jamar Dixon	19	0	17	0	0	0	2	0
23	DF	(Canada) CAN	Jadon Vilfort	0	0	0	0	0	0	0	0
26	DF	(Canada) CAN	Thomas Meilleur-Giguère	35	1	30	1	1	0	4	0
27	MF	(Canada) CAN	Protais Bumbu Mutambala	10	0	8	0	0	0	2	0
31	MF	(Canada) CAN	Luca Ricci	0	0	0	0	0	0	0	0
49	DF	(Canada) CAN	Robert Boskovic	10	0	9	0	1	0	0	0
58	DF	(United States) USA	Dakota Barnathan	28	0	24	0	0	0	4	0
90	MF	(Canada) CAN	Cameron Shaw	1	0	1	0	0	0	0	0
92	FW	(Guinea) GUI	Hadji Barry	17	6	14	6	1	0	2	0

=== Disciplinary record ===
No.	Pos.	Name	USLC		USLC Playoffs		Canadian Championship		Total	
No.	Pos.	Name	Yellow card	Red card	Yellow card	Red card	Yellow card	Red card	Yellow card	Red card
1	GK	(Canada) Callum Irving	1	0	0	0	0	0	1	0
4	DF	(Canada) Nana Attakora	3	0	0	0	0	0	3	0
5	MF	(Germany) Wal Fall	8	1	1	0	0	0	9	1
6	MF	(Canada) Chris Mannella	6	0	0	0	0	0	1	0
7	DF	(England) Onua Obasi	4	0	0	0	0	0	4	0
8	DF	(Canada) Jérémy Gagnon-Laparé	6	1	0	0	0	0	6	1
9	DF	(Canada) Carl Haworth	7	0	0	0	0	0	7	0
10	FW	(Cape Verde) Kevin Oliveira	5	0	0	0	0	0	5	0
11	FW	(Senegal) Mour Samb	2	0	0	0	0	0	2	0
14	MF	(England) Charlie Ward	4	0	0	0	0	0	4	0
15	DF	(Canada) Maxim Tissot	2	0	0	0	0	0	2	0
17	FW	(Haiti) Christiano François	1	0	0	0	0	0	1	0
19	MF	(Brazil) Thiago De Freitas	3	0	0	0	0	0	3	0
26	DF	(Canada) Thomas Meilleur-Giguère	1	0	0	0	0	0	1	0
49	DF	(Canada) Robert Boskovic	2	0	0	0	0	0	2	0
58	DF	(United States) Dakota Barnathan	1	0	0	0	0	0	1	0

=== Clean sheets ===
No.	Name	USLC	USLC Playoffs	Canadian Championship	Total	Games Played		
No.	Name	1	(Canada) Callum Irving	8	0	0	8	36
12	(Canada) David Monsalve	1	0	0	1	3		
