= 2018 Charleston Battery season =

Charleston Battery
2018 season
- President: Andrew Bell
- Head coach: Michael Anhaeuser
- Stadium: MUSC Health Stadium
- USL: Conference: Overall:
- U.S. Open Cup: Fourth round
Home colors	Away colors	Third colors

The 2018 Charleston Battery season was the club's 26th year of existence, their 15th season in the second tier of the United States Soccer Pyramid. It was their eighth season in the United Soccer League as part of the Eastern Conference.

== Background ==
The Battery finished the 2017 season with a record of 15–9–8, finished 2nd in the Eastern Conference, and 3rd overall. In the 2017 USL Playoffs, Charleston were upset in the first round by the New York Red Bulls II. Elsewhere, the Battery reached the fourth round of the 2017 U.S. Open Cup, losing 2–3 to MLS outfit, Atlanta United FC.

== Club ==
Note: Flags indicate national team as defined under FIFA eligibility rules; some limited exceptions apply. Players may hold more than one non-FIFA nationality.

No.	Pos.	Nation	Player
1	GK	USA	Joe Kuzminsky
2	DF	USA	Jay Bolt
3	DF	CAN	Skylar Thomas
4	DF	USA	Taylor Mueller
6	DF	TTO	Leland Archer
7	DF	JAM	O'Brian Woodbine
8	MF	TTO	Neveal Hackshaw
9	FW	USA	Ian Svantesson
10	MF	TTO	Ataullah Guerra
12	MF	COL	Vincenzo Candela
13	MF	USA	Nico Rittmeyer
14	MF	USA	Jarad van Schaik
15	FW	GER	Gordon Wild (on loan from Atlanta United FC)
16	GK	USA	Robert Beebe
17	FW	NGR	Patrick Okonkwo (on loan from Atlanta United FC)
18	MF	USA	Ryan Arambula
19	MF	USA	Dante Marini
20	FW	USA	Victor Mansaray
21	MF	HON	Angelo Kelly-Rosales
22	MF	CMR	Brian Anunga
23	GK	CUB	Odisnel Cooper
25	MF	JPN	Kotaro Higashi

== Transfers ==
=== In ===
No.	Pos.	Nat.	Player	Age	Transferred from	Club Nat.	Fee	Date	Source
9	FW	(United States)	Ian Svantesson	24	Tulsa Roughnecks	(United States)	Free	December 12, 2017	
2	DF	(United States)	Jay Bolt	23	Jacksonville Armada	(United States)	Free	January 25, 2018	
12	MF	(Colombia)	Vincenzo Candela	23	Llaneros	(Colombia)	Free	February 20, 2018	
6	DF	(Trinidad and Tobago)	Leland Archer	22	South Georgia Tormenta	(United States)	Free	May 10, 2018	

=== Out ===
No.	Pos.	Nat.	Player	Age	Transferred to	Club Nat.	Fee	Date	Source
9	FW	(Jamaica)	Romario Williams	23	Atlanta United FC	(United States)	End of loan	November 15, 2017	
15	DF	(United States)	Mikey Ambrose	22	Atlanta United FC	(United States)	End of loan	November 15, 2017	
30	FW	(Ghana)	Jeffrey Otoo	18	Atlanta United FC	(United States)	End of loan	November 15, 2017	
3	DF	(United States)	Forrest Lasso	24	FC Cincinnati	(United States)	Free	November 20, 2017	
20	MF	(United States)	Justin Portillo	25	Real Monarchs	(United States)	Free	November 29, 2017	
21	MF	(Cuba)	Maikel Chang	26	Real Monarchs	(United States)	Free	November 29, 2017	
17	FW	(Costa Rica)	Ricky Garbanzo	25			Released	November 30, 2017	
16	FW	(Cuba)	Heviel Cordovés	27	Richmond Kickers	(United States)	Free	December 4, 2017	
19	MF	(Italy)	Dante Marini	25	Retired	—N/a	—N/a	December 31, 2017	
1	GK	(Greece)	Alexandros Tabakis	25	North Carolina FC	(United States)	Free	March 2, 2018	

=== Loaned in ===
No.	Pos.	Nat.	Player	Age	Loaned from	Club Nat.	Start	End	Source
15	FW	(Germany)	Gordon Wild	22	Atlanta United FC	(United States)	March 1, 2018	November 30, 2018	
17	FW	(Nigeria)	Patrick Okonkwo	19	Atlanta United FC	(United States)	March 1, 2018	November 30, 2018	

== Non-competitive ==
February 15	Charleston Battery	3–3	Coastal Carolina Chanticleers	Charleston, South Carolina
17:30 EST (UTC−05:00)	Guerra 8'; Mueller 16'; Higashi 41'		Fortune 22'; 49'; Kenton 59'	Stadium: MUSC Health Stadium

February 28	Charleston Battery	5–1	Georgia Southern Eagles	Charleston, South Carolina
19:30 EST (UTC−05:00)	Rittmeyer 59', 67', 85', 86'; Guerra 83'		Carbonell 22' (pen.), (yellow card) 35'	Stadium: MUSC Health Stadium

March 10	Charleston Battery	0–1 (a.e.t.)	North Carolina FC	Charleston, South Carolina
11:00 EST (UTC−05:00)			Ríos	Stadium: MUSC Health Stadium

=== Carolina Challenge Cup ===
February 17 1	Charleston Battery	1–0	Minnesota United FC	Charleston, South Carolina
19:30 EST (UTC−05:00)	Mueller (yellow card) 31'; Svantesson 45+1'; Okonkwo (yellow card) 56'	Report	Nicholson (yellow card) 35'; Boxall (yellow card) 45'; Warner (yellow card) 47' (yellow-red card) 83'	Stadium: MUSC Health Stadium

February 21 2	Charleston Battery	1−2	Columbus Crew SC	Charleston, South Carolina
17:00 EST (UTC−05:00)	Svantesson 32'	Report	Zardes 56', 82'	Stadium: MUSC Health Stadium; Referee: Jose Carlos Rivero

February 24 3	Charleston Battery	0−0	Atlanta United FC	Charleston, South Carolina
19:30 EST (UTC−05:00)		Report		Stadium: MUSC Health Stadium

== Competitive ==
=== USL ===
==== Table ====
Pos	Team	Pld	W	D	L	GF	GA	GD	Pts	Qualification
2	Louisville City FC (C)	34	19	9	6	71	38	+33	66	Conference Playoffs
3	Pittsburgh Riverhounds SC	34	15	14	5	47	26	+21	59	Conference Playoffs
4	Charleston Battery	34	14	14	6	47	34	+13	56	Conference Playoffs
5	New York Red Bulls II	34	13	13	8	71	59	+12	52	Conference Playoffs
6	Bethlehem Steel FC	34	14	8	12	56	41	+15	50	Conference Playoffs

Source: 2018 USL standings
Rules for classification: 1) total wins; 2) total goal differential; 3) total goals scored; 4) points earned against top four Conference finishers; 5) disciplinary points; 6) coin toss or drawing of lots
(C) Champions

==== Results by round ====
Round	1	2	3	4	5	6	7	8	9	10	11	12	13	14	15	16	17	18	19	20	21	22	23	24	25	26	27	28	29	30	31	32	33	34
Stadium	H	H	A	A	A	A	H	H	H	H	H	A	A	A	H	A	A	H	H	A	H	A	A	H	A	H	A	H	H	A	H	H	A	A
Result	L	W	L	D	D	L	W	W	W	D	D	D	L	D	D	W	D	W	W	D	W	D	D	W	L	D	D	W	D	D	W	L		

Updated to match(es) played on October 1, 2018. Source: 2018 Battery Schedule
A = Away; H = Home; W = Win; D = Draw; L = Loss; P = Postponed

=== Regular season ===
Win Draw Loss

All times are in Eastern Time Zone.

March 17 1	Charleston Battery	0–1	FC Cincinnati	Charleston, South Carolina
7:00 PM	Guerra (yellow card) 51' van Schiak (yellow card) 80'; Griffith (red card) 90+2'	Report	Smith 18'; Laing (yellow card) 63'; Lasso (yellow card) 85'; König (yellow card) 90+2'; Ryan (yellow card) 90+7'	Stadium: MUSC Health Stadium; Attendance: 4,598; Referee: Elvis Osmanovic

March 24 2	Charleston Battery	1–0	Penn FC	Charleston
7:00 PM	Svantesson (yellow card) 39'; Guerra 62'; Anunga (yellow card) 65'; Okonkwo (red card) 88'	Report	Tiago (yellow card) 70'	Stadium: MUSC Health Stadium; Attendance: 2,615; Referee: Marcos de Oliveira

March 31 3	New York Red Bulls II	5–2	Charleston Battery	Harrison, New Jersey
1:00 PM	Cásseres (yellow card) 41'; White 44' (pen.); Tinari 47'; Mines 50'; Moreno 62', 66'	Report	Svantesson (yellow card) 55'; Anuga 56', 78'	Stadium: Red Bull Arena; Attendance: 826; Referee: Jaroslaw Werel

April 8 4	Bethlehem Steel FC	1–1	Charleston Battery	Bethlehem, Pennsylvania
3:00 PM	Burke 45+4'; Ayuk (yellow card) 89'	Report	Thomas 42' van Schaik (yellow card) 55'; Cordovés (yellow card) 86'	Stadium: Goodman Stadium; Attendance: 1,625; Referee: Lorant Varga

April 21 5	Penn FC	1–1	Charleston Battery	Harrisburg, Pennsylvania
6:00 PM	Tiago (yellow card) 36'; Opoku (yellow card) 53'; Tribbett (yellow card) 56', (goal) 89'; Bond (yellow card) 65'; Eustáquio (yellow card) 82'	Report	Anunga (yellow card) 39'; Bolt (yellow card) 52'; Guerra 77'	Stadium: FNB Field; Attendance: 1,712; Referee: Guido Gonzalez

April 24 6	Atlanta United 2	0–3	Charleston Battery	Lawrenceville, Georgia
7:00 PM		Report	Svantesson 33'; Wild 51', 85'; Rittmeyer (yellow card) 71'; Tah Anunga (yellow card) 81'	Stadium: Coolray Field; Attendance: 2,047; Referee: Rubiel Vazquez

April 28 7	Charleston Battery	1–0	Tampa Bay Rowdies	Charleston
7:00 PM	Candela (yellow card) 5'; Guerra 45+1' van Schaik (yellow card) 46'	Report	Cole (yellow card) 30'	Stadium: MUSC Health Stadium; Attendance: 3,462; Referee: Ismir Pekmic

May 5 8	Charleston Battery	2–0	Charlotte Independence	Charleston
7:00 PM	Guerra 31'; Cooper (yellow card) 80'; Mansaray 87'	Report	Kalungi (yellow card) 11' (red card) 78'; Calvert (yellow card) 90'	Stadium: MUSC Health Stadium; Attendance: 2,637; Referee: Silviu Petrescu

May 12 9	Charleston Battery	2–1	Bethlehem Steel FC	Charleston
6:00 PM	Candela (yellow card) 20'; Rittmeyer (yellow card) 31'; Guerra 44'; Wild 53'	Report	Mbaizo (yellow card) 9'; Jones 65' (pen.)	Stadium: MUSC Health Stadium; Attendance: 4,659; Referee: Daniel Gutierrez

May 19 10	Charleston Battery	0–0	Ottawa Fury	Charleston
7:00 PM	Higashi (yellow card) 45+1'; Thomas (yellow card) 48'; *Rittmeyer (yellow card) 67'; Mueller (yellow card) 73'	Report	Edward (yellow card) 28'; Oliveira (yellow card) 34'	Stadium: MUSC Health Stadium; Attendance: 2,597; Referee: Kevin Broadley

May 26 11	Charleston Battery	1–1	Nashville SC	Charleston
7:00 PM	Guerra 50', (yellow card) 52'	Report	Doyle 25'; Reed (yellow card) 54'; Davis (yellow card) 90+3'	Stadium: MUSC Health Stadium; Attendance: 2,697; Referee: Jonathan Bilinski

May 30 12	Indy Eleven	3–3	Charleston Battery	Indianapolis, Indiana
7:00 PM	Ring (yellow card) 25'; Saad 43'; Mitchell (yellow card) 67'; McInerney (yellow card) 78'; Ayoze 86' (pen.), 90+3'	Report	van Schaik (yellow card) 19'; Anunga (yellow card) 43', (goal) 90+4'; Woodbine 62'; Guerra 80'; Candela (yellow card) 80'; Thomas (yellow card) 85'	Stadium: Lucas Oil Stadium; Attendance: 8,070; Referee: Luis Guardia

June 9 13	Richmond Kickers	2–0	Charleston Battery	Richmond, Virginia
7:00 PM	Cordovés (yellow card) 5', (goal) 63'; Luiz Fernando 90'	Report	Bolt (yellow card) 73'; Svantesson (yellow card) 86'	Stadium: City Stadium; Attendance: 3,441; Referee: Matt Franz

June 16 14	Charlotte Independence	1–1	Charleston Battery	Matthews, North Carolina
7:30 PM	Martínez (yellow card) 68'; Mwape 79'; Herrera (yellow card) 88'	Report	Higashi 25'	Stadium: Matthews Sportsplex; Attendance: 3,312; Referee: Rubiel Vazquez

June 23 15	Charleston Battery	0–0	Pittsburgh Riverhounds SC	Charleston
7:00 PM		Report	Roberts (yellow card) 74'; Greenspan (yellow card) 82'	Stadium: MUSC Health Stadium; Attendance: 2,862; Referee: Daniel Gutierrez

July 1 16	Toronto FC II	0–4	Charleston Battery	Toronto, Ontario
8:00 PM	Campbel (yellow card) 82'	Report	Rittmeyer (yellow card) 54'; Guerra 59'; Higashi 65'; Woodbine 82'; Thomas (yellow card) 84'; Wild 90+1'	Stadium: BMO Field; Attendance: 422; Referee: Carol Anne Chenard

July 7 17	North Carolina FC	1–1	Charleston Battery	Cary, North Carolina
7:00 PM	Ríos 81'; Guillen (yellow card) 90+5'	Report	Guerra 63'; Woodbine (yellow card) 69'	Stadium: Sahlen's Stadium at WakeMed Soccer Park; Attendance: 3,623; Referee: Javier Santos

July 11 18	Charleston Battery	2–1	Indy Eleven	Charleston
7:00 PM	Wild 22', 84'	Report	Starikov 58'	Stadium: MUSC Health Stadium; Attendance: 2,094; Referee: Marcos de Oliveira

July 14 19	Charleston Battery	2–1	Louisville City FC	Charleston
7:00PM	Guerra 5'; Hackshaw 27'; Woodbine (yellow card) 35'; Anunga (yellow card) 70'; Kuzminsky (yellow card) 90'	Report	Smith (yellow card) 73'; Mueller 88' (o.g.); Davis IV (yellow card) 90+1'; Jimenez (red card) 90+7'	Stadium: MUSC Health Stadium; Attendance: 2,451; Referee: Greg Dopka

July 21 20	Pittsburgh Riverhounds SC	0–1	Charleston Battery	Pittsburgh, Pennsylvania
7:00 PM	Vancaeyezeele (yellow card) 90'	Report	Guerra (yellow card) 83', (goal) 88'	Stadium: Highmark Stadium; Attendance: 3,371; Referee: Eric Tattersall

July 28 21	Charleston Battery	3–0	Richmond Kickers	Charleston
7:00 PM	Rittmeyer 15', 45'; Guerra 51'	Report		Stadium: MUSC Health Stadium; Attendance: 3,221; Referee: Sergii Demianchuk

August 4 22	North Carolina FC	0–0	Charleston Battery	Cary, North Carolina
7:00 P.M.		Report	Guerra (yellow card) 43'	Stadium: Sahlen's Stadium at WakeMed Soccer Park; Attendance: 4,026; Referee: Bardhyl Pashaj

August 8 23	Tampa Bay Rowdies	0–0	Charleston Battery	St. Petersburg, Florida
7:30 P.M.	Oduro (yellow card) 58'; Cole (yellow card) 86'	Report	Candela (yellow card) 23'	Stadium: Al Lang Stadium; Attendance: 5,028; Referee: Guido Gonzalez Jr.

August 11 24	Charleston Battery	1–0	Atlanta United 2	Charleston
7:00 PM	Okonkwo (yellow card) 7'; Svantesson 41' (pen.)	Report	Castro (yellow card) 26'	Stadium: MUSC Health Stadium; Attendance: 2,582; Referee: Lorant Varga

August 18 25	FC Cincinnati	3–0	Charleston Battery	Cincinnati, Ohio
7:30 EDT	Ledesma (yellow card) 13', (goal) 21'; Bone 45+1'; Barrett (yellow card) 53'; Thomas 90+5' (o.g.)	Report	Anunga (yellow card) 30'; Svantesson (yellow card) 87'	Stadium: Nippert Stadium; Attendance: 27,142; Referee: Rosendo Mendoza

August 25 26	Charleston Battery	4–4	New York Red Bulls II	Charleston
7:00 P.M.	Guerra 22', 45+2', (yellow card) 57'; Okonkwo 28', 75'; Tah Anunga (red card) 61'	Report	Barlow 64' (pen.), 73', 88'; Aguinaga 68'; Ackwei (yellow card) 90+3'	Stadium: MUSC Health Stadium; Attendance: 2,741; Referee: Matthew Franz

August 31 27	Louisville City FC	2–2	Charleston Battery	Louisville, Kentucky
7:30PM	Lancaster 18', 41'; Jimenez (yellow card) 62'	Report	Guerra (yellow card) 7'; Okonkwo 14'; Rittmeyer 21'; Candela (yellow card) 38'; Bolt (yellow card) 65'; Mueller (yellow card) 74'	Stadium: Louisville Slugger Field; Attendance: 6,971; Referee: Kevin Broadley

September 8 28	Charleston Battery	1–0	Tampa Bay Rowdies	Charleston
19:00 P.M.	Okonkwo 22'; Bolt (yellow card) 55'; Archer (yellow card) 90+6'	Report	Guenzatti (yellow card) 81'	Stadium: MUSC Health Stadium; Attendance: 2,949; Referee: Rubiel Vazquez

September 19 29	Charleston Battery	1–1	Charlotte Independence	Charleston
7:00 P.M.	Rittmeyer 9'; Woodbine (yellow card) 80'; Mansaray (yellow card) 90+1'	Report	Herrera 69' (pen.); Martínez (yellow card) 89'	Stadium: MUSC Health Stadium; Referee: Joseph Dickerson

September 22 30	Nashville SC	1–1	Charleston Battery	Nashville, Tennessee
8:30 P.M.	Hume 9'; Reed (yellow card) 45+2'	Report	Anunga 24'; Okonkwo (red card) 60'; Mansaray (yellow card) 63'	Stadium: First Tennessee Park; Attendance: 7,376; Referee: Farhad Dadkho

September 26 31	Charleston Battery	2–0	North Carolina FC	Charleston
7:00 PM	Mansaray 90+1'; Svantesson 90+4'	Report		Stadium: MUSC Health Stadium; Attendance: 1,748; Referee: Marcos DeOliveira

September 29 32	Charleston Battery	1–2	Toronto FC II	Charleston
7:00PM	Woodbine (yellow card) 37'; Okonkwo 52'	Report	Akinola 55'; Campbell (yellow card) 59'; Hamilton 65'; Mohammed (yellow card) 81'	Stadium: MUSC Health Stadium; Attendance: 3,612; Referee: Danielle Chesky

October 7 33	Atlanta United 2	2–1	Charleston Battery	Lawrenceville, Georgia
7:00 PM EDT	Williams 48', 65'; Carleton (yellow card) 64'	Report	Guerra 27'; Kelly-Rosales (yellow card) 56'; Wild (yellow card) 81'	Stadium: Coolray Field; Attendance: 3,304; Referee: Greg Dopka

October 13 34	Ottawa Fury	0–2	Charleston Battery	Ottawa, Ontario
1:00 P.M.		Report	Wild 14'; Svantesson 60', (yellow card) 84'	Stadium: TD Place Stadium; Attendance: 5,385; Referee: Yusri Rudolf

=== Postseason ===
October 20 Quarterfinal	Charleston Battery	0–1	New York Red Bulls II	Charleston
7:00 P.M.	Bolt (yellow card) 16'	Report	Barlow 21'; Stroud (yellow card) 66'	Stadium: MUSC Health Stadium; Attendance: 1,687; Referee: Rosendo Mendoza

=== U.S. Open Cup ===
May 16 Second round	Charleston Battery (South Carolina)	1–0	(Georgia (U.S. state)) South Georgia Tormenta	Charleston, South Carolina
7:00 pm EDT	Okonkwo 21'; Rittmeyer (yellow card) 46' (yellow-red card) 63'	CHS Report; Report	Vinyals (yellow card) 37' (yellow-red card) 87'; Arslan (yellow card) 56'	Stadium: MUSC Health Stadium; Attendance: 1,284; Referee: David Erbacher

May 23 Third round	Charleston Battery (South Carolina)	1–0	(Connecticut) Elm City Express	Charleston, South Carolina
7:00 pm EDT	Wild 83'; Candela (yellow card) 87'; Cooper (yellow card) 90+3'; Svantesson (yellow card) 90+4'	CHS Report; Report	Calderon (yellow card) 29'	Stadium: MUSC Health Stadium; Attendance: 1,242; Referee: Sergii Demianchuk

June 6 Fourth round	Atlanta United FC (Georgia (U.S. state))	3–0	(South Carolina) Charleston Battery	Kennesaw, Georgia
7:30 pm EDT	Carleton 14'; Barco 47' (pen.); Williams 64'	Report	Candela (yellow card) 86'	Stadium: Fifth Third Bank Stadium; Attendance: 9,742; Referee: Guido Gonzalez Jr.
