= 2020 Saint Louis FC season =

Saint Louis FC
2020 season
- Owner: SLSG Pro LLC
- Head coach: Steve Trittschuh
- United Soccer League: Eastern Conf.: 8th Group E: 2nd
- USL Playoffs: Conf. Semifinals
- U.S. Open Cup: Cancelled
- Kings' Cup: TBD
- Average home league attendance: Overall: 1,715; Pre-Covid: 4,019; Post-Covid: 947
- Biggest win: STL 4–1 MIA (March 7)
- Biggest defeat: LOU 3–0 STL (Sept. 12)
Home colors	Away colors

The 2020 Saint Louis FC season was the club's sixth and final season of existence, and their sixth consecutive season in the USL Championship, the second tier of American soccer. Saint Louis additionally competed in the U.S. Open Cup. This article covers the period from November 18, 2019, the day after the 2019 USLC Playoff Final, to the conclusion of the 2020 USLC Playoff Final, scheduled for November 12–16, 2020.

== Roster ==
As of March 4, 2020

No.	Position	Nation	Player
1	GK	USA	Kyle Morton
2	DF	CAN	Paris Gee
3	DF	COD	Phanuel Kavita
4	DF	USA	Sam Fink
5	MF	GER	Wal Fall
6	DF	AUT	Daniel Fischer
7	MF	USA	Todd Wharton
8	MF	ISR	Guy Abend
9	MF	USA	Russell Cicerone
10	FW	SEN	Samb Mour
11	MF	SLV	Joaquín Rivas
13	MF	USA	Kadeem Dacres
14	FW	ENG	Tyler Blackwood
17	MF	GHA	Oscar Umar
18	GK	USA	John Berner
21	DF	USA	Tobi Adewole
22	FW	USA	Kyle Greig
23	DF	ENG	Richard Bryan
28	DF	CAN	Jérémy Gagnon-Laparé
29	MF	USA	Nichi Vlastos
—	MF	USA	Kyle Genenbacher
—	DF	USA	Jansen Miller
—	DF	USA	Lawson Redmon

USL Academy Contract

== Competitive ==
=== USL Championship ===
==== Standings — Group E ====
Pos	Team	Pld	W	D	L	GF	GA	GD	Pts	PPG	Qualification
1	Louisville City FC	16	11	2	3	28	12	+16	35	2.19	Advance to USL Championship Playoffs
2	Saint Louis FC	16	7	4	5	22	21	+1	25	1.56	Advance to USL Championship Playoffs
3	Indy Eleven	16	7	2	7	21	19	+2	23	1.44	
4	Sporting Kansas City II	16	5	1	10	21	30	−9	16	1.00	

Source: USL

==== Match results ====
March 7 1	Saint Louis FC	4–1	Miami FC	Fenton, MO
1:00 PM	Greig 10'; Cicerone 21', 90+2'; Fink (yellow card) 59'; Kavita (yellow card) 71'; Blackwood 77'; Gee (yellow card) 84'	Report	9 R. Williams 45' (pen.)	Stadium: West Community Stadium; Attendance: 4,019; Referee: Jon Freemon

July 11 2	Indy Eleven	2–0	Saint Louis FC	Indianapolis, IN
6:00 PM CDT	Pasher 52'; Hackshaw 79'	Report		Stadium: Lucas Oil Stadium; Attendance: 4,761; Referee: Calin Radosav

July 18 3	Louisville City FC	0–1	Saint Louis FC	Louisville, KY
7:00 PM CDT	Williams (yellow card) 49'; Ownby (yellow card) 90+4'	Report	Gee (yellow card) 41'; Blackwood 52'; Wharton (yellow card) 73'	Stadium: Lynn Family Stadium; Attendance: 4,850; Referee: Youssef Elmessoussi

July 26 4	Saint Louis FC	1–0	Indy Eleven	Fenton, MO
4:00 PM CDT	Blackwood 24'; Fall (yellow card) 68'	Report	Hackshaw (yellow card) 44'	Stadium: West Community Stadium; Referee: Jervis Atagana

August 1 5	Memphis 901 FC	1–0	Saint Louis FC	Memphis, TN
7:30 PM CDT	Muckette (yellow card) 11'; Marsh-Brown 54'; Koffi (yellow card) 69'; Paul (yellow card) 90'; Hodge (yellow card) 90+2'; Segbers (yellow card) 90+6'	Report	Rivas (yellow card) 64'	Stadium: Autozone Park; Referee: Matt Thompson

August 5 6	Saint Louis FC	1–1	Sporting Kansas City II	Fenton, MO
7:00 PM CDT	Kavita 90+6'	Report	Riley (yellow card) 42'; Mushagalusa 56'; Prieur (yellow card) 90+5'	Stadium: West Community Stadium; Attendance: 1,156; Referee: Jon Freemon

August 8 7	Saint Louis FC	0–2	FC Tulsa	Fenton, MO
19:00 PM CDT	Umar (yellow card) 18'; Blackwood (yellow card) 75'; Bryan (yellow card) 83'	Report	43' Bird; (yellow card) 59' Garcia; (yellow card) 72' Martinez; (yellow card) 87' da Costa; 90' Suarez	Stadium: West Community Stadium; Attendance: 950; Referee: Jervis Atagana

August 15 8	Saint Louis FC	3–1	Sporting Kansas City II	Fenton, MO
19:00 PM CDT	Cicerone 5'; Samb 69'; Rivas 90+2', (yellow card) 90+7'	Report	Riley (yellow card) 36'; Duke 40'; LeFlore (yellow card) 62'; Rad (red card) 90+5'	Stadium: West Community Stadium; Attendance: 736; Referee: Jervis Atagana

August 22 9	Pittsburgh Riverhounds	2–2	Saint Louis FC	Pittsburgh, PA
18:00 PM CDT	Mensah 16'; Mertz 40'; Thomas (yellow card) 45+3'; Lindstrom (yellow card) 56'	Report	Greig 45+1'; Fall 57'	Stadium: Highmark Stadium; Referee: Kevin Fikar

August 29 10	Saint Louis FC	1–1	Louisville City FC	Fenton, MO
19:00 PM CDT	Samb 64'; Wharton (yellow card) 74'; Umar (yellow card) 90+3'	Report	Totsch 30', (yellow card) 54'; Ockford (yellow card) 90+7'	Stadium: West Community Stadium; Referee: Ismir Pekmic

September 4 11	Saint Louis FC	3–2	Sporting Kansas City II	Fenton, MO
19:00 PM CDT	Greig 54'; Blackwood 58'; Fink (yellow card) 70'; Dacres 83'; Morton (yellow card) 90+3'	Report	Davis (yellow card) 20'; Harris 47', 90+3' (pen.); Mompremier (yellow card) 52'	Stadium: West Community Stadium; Referee: Matt Geringer

September 12 12	Louisville City FC	3–0	Saint Louis FC	Louisville, KY
18:30 PM CDT	Hoppenot 28'; Totsch (yellow card) 39'; Lancaster 44'; Johnson 90+6'	Report	Fischer (yellow card) 90'	Stadium: Lynn Family Stadium; Attendance: 4,852; Referee: Calin Radosav

September 19 13	Saint Louis FC	3–2	Sporting Kansas City II	Fenton, MO
7:00 PM CDT	Blackwood 12'; Cicerone 43'; Fink (yellow card) 71', (goal) 90+5'; Wharton (yellow card) 90+1'	Report	Čuić 59'; Davis (yellow card) 66'; LeFlore 86'; Leeth (yellow card) 90+5'	Stadium: West Community Stadium; Referee: Matthew Thompson

September 23 14	Indy Eleven	1–1	Saint Louis FC	Indianapolis, IN
6:00 PM CDT	Conner (yellow card) 55'; Hackshaw (yellow card) 64', (goal) 72'; Barrett (yellow card) 85'; Carleton (yellow card) 89'	Report; Report	Wharton (yellow card) 4' (yellow-red card) 75'; Greig (yellow card) 45'; Adewole (yellow card) 45+2'; Fink (yellow card) 45+4' (yellow-red card) 61'; Cicerone 50'	Stadium: Lucas Oil Stadium; Attendance: 5,664; Referee: Lukasz Szpala

September 26 15	Saint Louis FC	0–1	Louisville City FC	Fenton, MO
7:00 PM CDT	Fall (yellow card) 67'; Kavita (yellow card) 73'	Report	Ownby (yellow card) 14'; Williams 43'; Souahy (yellow card) 57'	Stadium: West Community Stadium; Referee: Sergii Demianchuk

October 3 16	Saint Louis FC	2–1	Indy Eleven	Fenton, MO
7:00 PM CDT	Blackwood (yellow card) 8', (goal) 35'; Cicerone (yellow card) 18'; Fall 47' (pen.); Adewole (yellow card) 69'	Report	Antley (yellow card) 21'; Gibson (yellow card) 45+2'; Barrett (yellow card) 61'; Conner (yellow card) 63'; Pasher 82' (pen.)	Stadium: West Community Stadium; Referee: Tori Penso

==== USL Cup Playoffs ====
October 10 Conf. Quarterfinals	Hartford Athletic	0–1	Saint Louis FC	Hartford, CT
6:00 PM CDT	Silva (yellow card) 16'; Strong (yellow card) 45+1'; Barrera (yellow card) 61'; Politz (yellow card) 90+3'	Report	Greig (yellow card) 73'; Fall (yellow card) 89'; Rivas 90+3'	Stadium: Dillon Stadium; Attendance: 2,194; Referee: Kevin Broadley

October 17 Conf. Semifinals	Louisville City FC	2–0	Saint Louis FC	Louisville, KY
6:30 PM CDT	Totsch (yellow card) 11'; Lancaster 18'; Williams (yellow card) 20'; Lundt (yellow card) 75'; Adewole 83' (o.g.)	Report	Fall (penalty missed) 12'; Gee (yellow card) 25'; Fink (yellow card) 82'; Samb (yellow card) 90+3'	Stadium: Lynn Family Stadium; Attendance: 4,900; Referee: Lukasz Szpala

=== U.S. Open Cup ===
As a USL Championship club, St. Louis FC will enter the competition in the Second Round, to be played April 7–9.

April 7 2nd Round	FC Motown (New Jersey) or NY Pancyprian-Freedoms (New York (state))	P–P	(Missouri) Saint Louis FC	Montclair, NJ or Queens, NY
7:00pm EDT or 8:00 pm EDT				Stadium: MSU Soccer Park at Pittser Field or Belson Stadium
Note: Match postponed due to the COVID-19 pandemic
