= Van Oekel =

van Oekel is a Dutch surname. Notable people with it include:

- Matt Van Oekel (born 1986), American association football goalkeeper
- Sjef van Oekel, Dutch TV comedy character

== See also ==
- Van Roekel
