= Jérémy Gagnon-Laparé =

Canadian soccer player (born 1995)

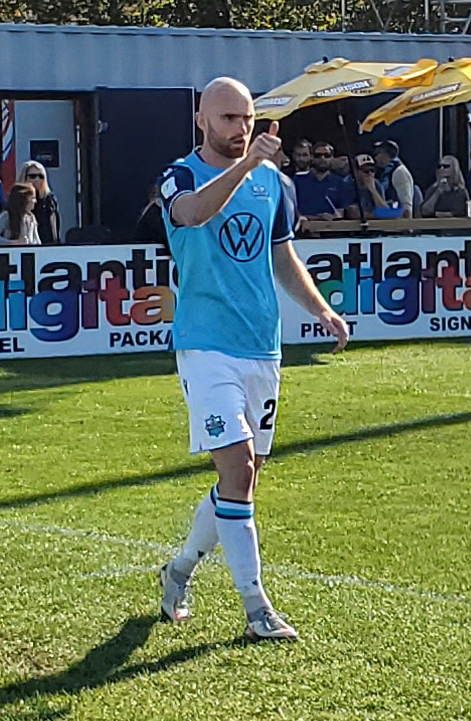
- Gagnon-Laparé with HFX Wanderers in 2021

Personal information
- Full name: Jérémy Gagnon-Laparé
- Date of birth: March 9, 1995 (age 31)
- Place of birth: Sherbrooke, Quebec, Canada
- Height: 1.80 m (5 ft 11 in)
- Position: Midfielder

Youth career
- CS Magog
- 2011–2014: Montreal Impact

Senior career*
Years	Team	Apps	(Gls)
2014	Montreal Impact U23	6	(0)
2015–2016	FC Montreal	29	(1)
2014–2016	Montreal Impact	7	(0)
2015	→ Ottawa Fury FC (loan)	2	(0)
2017–2018	Vitré	37	(2)
2018–2019	Ottawa Fury FC	43	(0)
2020	Saint Louis FC	9	(0)
2021–2022	HFX Wanderers	44	(0)
2023	York United	21	(0)
2024–2025	HFX Wanderers	29	(0)

International career^{‡}
2012–2013	Canada U18	2	(0)
2014–2015	Canada U20	6	(0)
2015–2016	Canada U23	10	(0)
2013–2014	Canada	5	(0)
- * Club domestic league appearances and goals as of October 27, 2025 ‡ National team caps and goals as of May 20, 2016

Jérémy Gagnon-Laparé (born March 9, 1995) is a Canadian professional soccer player.

== Club career ==
=== Early career ===
Gagnon-Laparé joined the Montreal Impact youth academy in 2011. In 2012, he would play with the academy's senior team in the first division of the Canadian Soccer League. He would help Montreal secure a playoff berth by finishing second in the division. In the preliminary round of the postseason, the senior team defeated Toronto FC's senior academy team. Montreal would qualify for the championship final after defeating the York Region Shooters in the semifinal round. In the championship match, the club was defeated by the reigning champions Toronto Croatia.

He resumed playing with the academy team in 2013 as the team participated in the U.S. Soccer Development Academy. Gagnon-Laparé would also play with the Montreal Impact's reserve team in the MLS Reserve League throughout the 2013 campaign. His final season with the Montreal youth team was in the 2014 season where he competed in the American-based USL Premier Development League.

=== Montreal Impact ===
On May 7, 2014, Gagnon-Laparé made his professional debut for the Montreal Impact in a 2–1 defeat to FC Edmonton in the Canadian Championship. Gagnon-Laparé signed his first professional contract with the Montreal Impact on July 3, 2014. He made his debut against Real Salt Lake on July 24, 2014. In his debut season with the Impact, he assisted the club in winning the Canadian Championship and secured a berth in the 2014–15 CONCACAF Champions League. He made his debut in the Champions League on September 18, 2014, against the New York Red Bulls.

Gagnon-Laparé joined Ottawa Fury FC on loan for the rest of the 2015 NASL season on October 6, 2015. After 3 seasons with the Impact, the club announced they would not pick up Gagnon-Laparé's contract option for the 2017 season.

=== Vitré ===
After trialing with Stade Rennais in late 2016, Gagnon-Laparé signed with CFA club AS Vitré in January 2017. He would spend 18 months at the club before departing at the end of the 2017–18 season.

=== Ottawa Fury ===
Gagnon-Laparé was signed by Ottawa Fury FC on July 16, 2018. In November 2018, The Fury announced Gagnon-Laparé would return for a second season in 2019. After two seasons with the Fury, the club would cease operations for the 2020 season, making Gagnon-Laparé a free agent.

=== Saint Louis FC ===
Following Ottawa ceasing operations and moving to Miami, Gagnon-Laparé stayed in the USL Championship with Saint Louis FC ahead of their 2020 season. With St. Louis City SC starting play in MLS in 2023, Saint Louis FC would fold at the end of the 2020 season, ending Gagnon-Laparés time at the club after one season.

=== HFX Wanderers ===
On January 20, 2021, Gagnon-Laparé signed a two-year contract with an option for 2023 with Canadian Premier League side HFX Wanderers. In December 2022, his contract option was declined, ending his time with the club after two seasons.

=== York United ===
Shortly after leaving the HFX Wanderers, Gagnon-Laparé signed with fellow CPL team York United on a two-year deal.

=== HFX Wanderers return ===
In 2024, Gagnon-Laparé returned to HFX Wanderers, and he remained with the team for the 2025 season. He featured in 23 games in the 2024 season, but was used sparingly in 2025, playing just 70 minutes in the regular season. However, he came on as a substitute in the Wanderers' playoff match against York United, and in extra time scored what seemed to be the winner in the 113th minute, making the match 2-1. But York would tie the match, causing it to come down to penalties, where Gagnon-Laparés miss would consign his team to defeat.

== International career ==
Gagnon-Laparé has represented Canada at the U-18 level. On August 27, 2013, he received his first call up to the Canada national team by new manager Benito Floro for two friendlies against Mauritania on September 8 and 10. He made his international debut in the first friendly which ended in a goalless draw.

After being a mainstay with Floro and the senior team for most of 2014, Gagnon-Laparé was called into the U20 team by coach Rob Gale on November 7, 2014. He made his debut in a friendly against England's U-20 side five days later and played the full 90 minutes in a 2–2 draw.

In May 2016, Gagnon-Lapare was called to Canada's U23 national team for a pair of friendlies against Guyana and Grenada. He saw action in both matches.

== Career statistics ==
As of October 27, 2025

Club	League	Season	League		Playoffs		National Cup		Continental		Total	
Club	League	Season	Apps	Goals	Apps	Goals	Apps	Goals	Apps	Goals	Apps	Goals
FC Montreal	USL	2015	16	1	—		—		—		16	1
FC Montreal	USL	2016	13	0	—		—		—		13	0
FC Montreal	Total		29	1	0	0	0	0	0	0	29	1
Montreal Impact	MLS	2014	5	0	—		1	0	2	0	8	0
Montreal Impact	MLS	2015	2	0	0	0	0	0	0	0	2	0
Montreal Impact	MLS	2016	0	0	0	0	1	0	—		1	0
Montreal Impact	Total		7	0	0	0	2	0	2	0	11	0
Ottawa Fury FC (loan)	NASL	2015	2	0	1	0	0	0	—		3	0
Vitré	CFA	2016–17	13	1	—		0	0	—		13	1
Vitré	National 2	2017–18	24	1	—		2	0	—		26	1
Vitré	Total		37	2	0	0	2	0	0	0	39	2
Ottawa Fury	USL	2018	11	0	—		1	0	—		12	0
Ottawa Fury	USL Championship	2019	32	0	1	0	4	0	—		37	0
Ottawa Fury	Total		43	0	1	0	5	0	0	0	49	0
Saint Louis FC	USL Championship	2020	9	0	0	0	—		—		9	0
HFX Wanderers	Canadian Premier League	2021	22	0	—		2	0	—		24	0
HFX Wanderers	Canadian Premier League	2022	22	0	—		1	0	—		23	0
HFX Wanderers	Total		44	0	0	0	3	0	0	0	47	0
York United	Canadian Premier League	2023	21	0	1	0	1	0	—		23	0
HFX Wanderers	Canadian Premier League	2024	23	0	—		1	0	—		24	0
HFX Wanderers	Canadian Premier League	2025	6	0	1	1	0	0	—		7	1
HFX Wanderers	Total		29	0	1	1	1	0	0	0	31	1
Career total			221	3	4	1	14	0	2	0	241	4

== Honors ==
Montreal Impact Academy

- CSL Championship Runners-up: 2012
