= Mour Samb =

Senegalese professional footballer (born 1994)

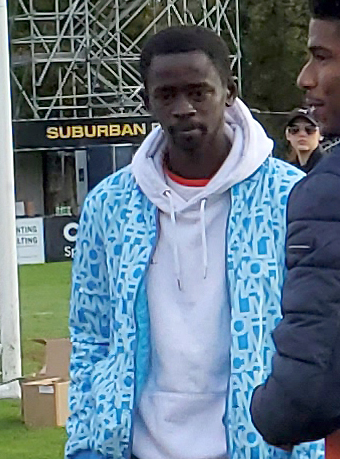
- Mour Samb in 2022

Personal information
- Full name: Elhadji Mour Samb
- Date of birth: 8 January 1994 (age 32)
- Place of birth: Saly, Senegal
- Height: 1.83 m (6 ft 0 in)
- Position: Forward

Youth career
- Diambars

Senior career*
| Years | Team | Apps | (Gls) |
| 2009–2012 | Diambars | | |
| 2012–2015 | Lille B | 41 | (7) |
| 2015–2017 | Diambars | | |
| 2017–2018 | Tromsø | 25 | (0) |
| 2019 | Ottawa Fury | 18 | (7) |
| 2020 | Saint Louis FC | 9 | (2) |
| 2021 | Diambars | | |
| 2022 | HFX Wanderers | 9 | (1) |
| 2025– | Royal-Sélect de Beauport | 3 | (3) |
- * Club domestic league appearances and goals as of 23 September 2025

Elhadji Mour Samb (born 8 January 1994) is a Senegalese professional footballer who plays for Royal-Sélect de Beauport in Ligue1 Québec.

== Early life ==
Samb was born in Saly, Senegal and developed with local club Diambars.

== Club career ==
He began his senior career with Diambars.

In 2012, he joined French club Lille, signing a three-year trainee contract after a successful trial. He played for the Lille B side, scoring seven goals in 41 appearances. After three years, he left the club.

After recovering from an injury, he returned to his former club Diambars in 2015. In 2016, he won the Senegalese League Cup. In 2017, he scored ten goals in 16 league games.

In late 2016, Samb went on trial with Turkish clubs Bursaspor and Gaziantepspor, before going on trial with Norwegian club Tromsø in September. After a week and a half trial, he returned home to Senegal while the club considered whether to extend a contract offer. He later returned to the club on trial in 2017. In March 2017, Samb joined Tromsø, signing a four-year contract, with Diambars retaining a sell-on clause. It took about a month for the transfer to be finalized as he awaited his work permit. On 3 August 2018, Samb left Tromsø by mutual consent.

Samb signed with Canadian side Ottawa Fury FC in February 2019, after a successful trial. After starting the season with seven goals and four assists in 14 games, Samb suffered a foot injury which caused him to miss the next 13 games. He finished the season with eight goals and six assists in 19 matches, including a goal in a playoff loss to the Charleston Battery.

In January 2020, Samb joined USL Championship club Saint Louis FC. He scored his first goal on August 16 against Sporting Kansas City II.

After a third spell with Diambars, Samb returned to Canada on 9 May 2022, signing a one-year contract with an option for 2023 with Canadian Premier League side HFX Wanderers. He made his debut for the Wanderers on May 20 as a substitute against Forge FC. In December 2022, HFX announced that Samb would not return for the 2023 season.

== Personal life ==
Samb is a Canadian permanent resident.

== Career statistics ==
As of 23 September 2025

Club statistics
| Club | Season | League | | | Playoffs (Note: Includes appearances in the USL Championship playoffs.) | | National Cup (Note: Includes appearances in the Norwegian Football Cup.) | | Other | | Total | |
| Club | Season | Division | Apps | Goals | Apps | Goals | Apps | Goals | Apps | Goals | Apps | Goals |
|---|---|---|---|---|---|---|---|---|---|---|---|---|
| Lille B | 2012–13 | Championnat de France Amateur | 10 | 3 | — | | — | | 0 | 0 | 10 | 3 |
| Lille B | 2013–14 | Championnat de France Amateur | 9 | 1 | — | | — | | 0 | 0 | 9 | 1 |
| Lille B | 2014–15 | Championnat de France Amateur | 22 | 3 | — | | — | | 0 | 0 | 22 | 3 |
| Lille B | Total | | 41 | 7 | 0 | 0 | 0 | 0 | 0 | 0 | 41 | 7 |
| Tromsø | 2017 | Eliteserien | 16 | 0 | — | | 1 | 0 | 0 | 0 | 17 | 0 |
| Tromsø | 2018 | Eliteserien | 9 | 0 | — | | 2 | 0 | 0 | 0 | 11 | 0 |
| Tromsø | Total | | 25 | 0 | 0 | 0 | 3 | 0 | 0 | 0 | 28 | 0 |
| Ottawa Fury | 2019 | USL Championship | 18 | 7 | 1 | 1 | 0 | 0 | — | | 19 | 8 |
| Saint Louis FC | 2020 | USL Championship | 9 | 2 | 2 | 0 | 0 | 0 | — | | 11 | 2 |
| HFX Wanderers | 2022 | Canadian Premier League | 9 | 1 | — | | 1 | 0 | — | | 10 | 1 |
| Royal-Sélect de Beauport | 2025 | Ligue1 Québec | 3 | 3 | – | | – | | 1 | 1 | 4 | 4 |
| Career total | | | 105 | 20 | 3 | 1 | 4 | 0 | 0 | 0 | 113 | 22 |
