= Gordon Wild =

German footballer

Personal information
- Date of birth: 16 October 1995 (age 31)
- Place of birth: Leonberg, Germany
- Height: 1.78 m (5 ft 10 in)
- Position: Left winger

Youth career
- Mainz 05
- 2013–2015: Wehen Wiesbaden

College career
Years	Team	Apps	(Gls)
2015	USC Upstate Spartans	15	(16)
2016–2017	Maryland Terrapins	40	(22)

Senior career*
Years	Team	Apps	(Gls)
2014–2015	Wehen Wiesbaden II	4	(0)
2018–2019	Atlanta United	0	(0)
2018	→ Charleston Battery (loan)	32	(7)
2019	→ Atlanta United 2 (loan)	8	(1)
2019	D.C. United	0	(0)
2019	→ Loudoun United (loan)	16	(10)
2020	LA Galaxy	3	(0)
2021	Indy Eleven	27	(3)
2022–2023	MSV Duisburg	5	(0)
2023	1. FC Bocholt	12	(3)
2023–2024	TuS Bövinghausen	10	(3)
2024	TVD Velbert	0	(0)
- * Club domestic league appearances and goals as of 17:23, 4 July 2024 (UTC)

Gordon Wild (born 16 October 1995) is a German professional footballer who plays as a left winger.

== College career ==
Wild played one year of college soccer at University of South Carolina Upstate in 2015, before moving to the University of Maryland, where he played for two years.

== Professional career ==
Ahead of the 2018 MLS SuperDraft, Wild signed a Generation Adidas contract with MLS. On 17 January 2018, Wild was selected 37th overall in the SuperDraft by Atlanta United.

In February 2018, Wild was loaned to United Soccer League side Charleston Battery. He made his professional debut on 17 March 2018 as an 80th-minute substitute in a 1–0 loss to FC Cincinnati.

On 17 July 2019, Wild was waived by Atlanta. Wild was signed a week later by D.C. United. He made his first non-official appearance for D.C. United in a friendly against Olympique de Marseille on 24 July 2019.

Since Wild has signed with DC United he has appeared numerous times for D.C. United's USL affiliate Loudoun United. Wild debuted for Loudoun on 28 July 2019, in a 3–0 win against Louisville City FC. He scored three goals against the Swope Park Rangers on 25 September 2019, earning him a hat trick; the first hat trick in Loudoun United's history.

On 19 January 2020, Wild announced his departure from D.C. United via Instagram.

On 25 February 2020, Wild joined LA Galaxy. Wild made his first MLS appearance off the bench against the Portland Timbers in the MLS is Back tournament, registering an assist for a Javier Hernandez goal. He was released by LA Galaxy on 30 November 2020.

On 11 February 2021, Wild signed with USL Championship side Indy Eleven. Following the 2021 season, it was announced that Wild's contract option was declined by Indy Eleven.

He signed with MSV Duisburg in the summer of 2022. On 29 January 2023, Wild's contract with Duisburg was terminated by mutual consent. Two days later, he moved to 1. FC Bocholt.

Wild signed for TVD Velbert in January 2024 and left a week later.

== Career statistics ==
As of 18 September 2022

Appearances and goals by club, season and competition
Club	Season	Division	League		Cup		Other		Total	
Club	Season	Division	Apps	Goals	Apps	Goals	Apps	Goals	Apps	Goals
Wehen Wiesbaden II	2014–15	Hessenliga	4	0	—		—		4	0
Charleston Battery	2018	USL Championship	32	7	1	1	1 (Note: Appearance in playoff)	0	34	8
Atlanta United 2	2019	USL Championship	8	1	—		—		8	1
Loudoun United	2019	USL Championship	16	10	—		—		16	10
LA Galaxy	2020	Major League Soccer	1	0	—		2 (Note: Appearances in MLS is Back Tournament)	0	3	0
Indy Eleven	2021	USL Championship	27	3	—		—		27	3
MSV Duisburg	2022–23	3. Liga	5	0	—		—		5	0
Career total			93	21	1	1	3	0	97	22
