= Van Roekel =

Van Roekel or VanRoekel is a toponymic surname of Dutch origin, meaning "from Roekel". Notable people with the surname include:

- Dennis Van Roekel, president of the National Education Association
- Steven VanRoekel, American civil servant
- Steven J. VanRoekel, American Business Executive

Fictional characters:

- Niles Van Roekel, Marvel Comics villain
