= Romario Piggott =

Panamanian football player (born 1995)

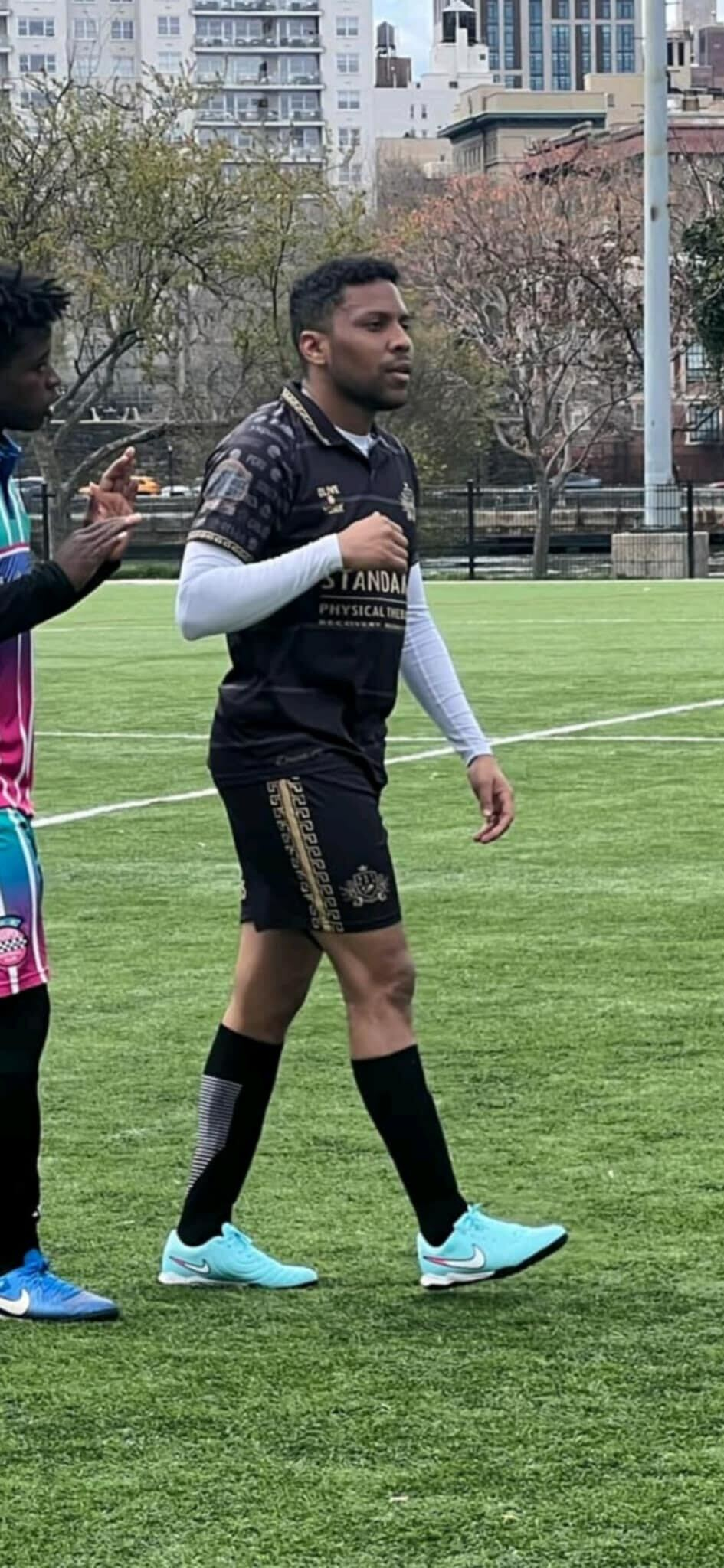
- Piggott playing for NY International FC in April 2025

Personal information
- Full name: Romario Antonio Piggott Rivera
- Date of birth: 17 July 1995 (age 31)
- Place of birth: Panama City, Panama
- Height: 1.80 m (5 ft 11 in)
- Positions: Forward; attacking midfielder

College career
Years	Team	Apps	(Gls)
2016	Ancilla Chargers	18	(24)
2017	Coastal Carolina Chanticleers	22	(6)

Senior career*
Years	Team	Apps	(Gls)
2012–2015	Chepo	59	(4)
2015	Tauro	14	(0)
2018	Myrtle Beach Mutiny	13	(6)
2019–2022	Charleston Battery	84	(12)
2024–	NY International		

International career^{‡}
2011	Panama U17	4	(0)
2013	Panama U20	3	(1)
- * Club domestic league appearances and goals as of 19 April 2025 ‡ National team caps and goals as of 12 March 2019

Romario Antonio Piggott Rivera (born 17 July 1995) is a Panamanian footballer who plays as a midfielder.

== Career ==
In 2018. Piggot joined the Myrtle Beach Mutiny of the Premier Development League. He played with the team during the 2018 U.S. Open Cup and the regular season.

On September 7, 2018, Piggot signed with Charleston Battery. Following the 2022 season, Piggott was released by Charleston.

In late 2024, Piggot joined NY International FC of the Cosmopolitan Soccer League's Division 1.

== Personal life ==
Piggot is the son of former professional footballer and Panama national football team player Pércival Piggott. He played under his father during his time managing at Tauro.
