= Patrick Okonkwo =

Nigerian footballer (born 1998)

Personal information
- Date of birth: April 23, 1998 (age 28)
- Place of birth: Lagos, Nigeria
- Height: 1.83 m (6 ft 0 in)
- Position: Forward

Youth career
- 2014–2016: Georgia United
- 2016–2017: Atlanta United

Senior career*
Years	Team	Apps	(Gls)
2017	Charleston Battery	3	(0)
2018–2019	Atlanta United	0	(0)
2018	→ Charleston Battery (loan)	23	(5)
2019	→ Atlanta United 2 (loan)	16	(2)
2020	Chattaooga Red Wolves	5	(0)
2021–2022	Kalonji Pro-Profile		
2022	Cosmos Koblenz	7	(1)
2023	Apotheos FC	9	(3)
2024	Georgia FC	16	(5)
- * Club domestic league appearances and goals as of 21:03, 16 December 2024 (UTC)

Patrick Okonkwo (born April 23, 1998) is a Nigerian footballer who plays as a forward.

== Early life ==
Okonkwo was born in Lagos, Nigeria and raised by his aunt and uncle, before moving to Jamaica and later to the United States where he was adopted by a family in Suwanee, Georgia in 2013.

== Professional career ==
On June 17, 2017 it was announced that Okonkwo would sign with Major League Soccer side Atlanta United as a Home Grown Player at the beginning of the 2018 season.

In August 2017, Okonkwo signed with United Soccer League side Charleston Battery, the USL affiliate of Atlanta United and a club he'd spent time with in 2016, until the end of their 2018 season. While on loan from Atlanta United, Okonkwo scored six goals for the Charleston Battery during the club's 2018 campaign.

Okonkwo was waived by Atlanta at the end of their 2019 season.

On September 10, 2020, Okonkwo joined USL League One side Chattanooga Red Wolves SC.
