= Thiago Freitas =

Brazilian footballer

Personal information
- Full name: Thiago Schmidel de Freitas
- Date of birth: 13 April 1987 (age 39)
- Place of birth: Vitória, Brazil
- Height: 6 ft 2 in (1.88 m)
- Position: Midfielder

Youth career
- 2005–2006: Fluminense
- 2006: Padova

Senior career*
Years	Team	Apps	(Gls)
2006–2007	Voghera		
2008–2009	Cascavel-PR		
2009	Prignitzer Kuckuck Kickers		
2009–2010	1. FC Lok Stendal		
2010	Haldensleber SC		
2010–2012	Feirense	33	(4)
2011	→ Chernomorets (loan)	0	(0)
2012–2013	Vasas SC	26	(5)
2013–2015	Hapoel Rishon LeZion	15	(2)
2015	AOT Alimos	5	(0)
2015	FC Edmonton	13	(0)
2016	Oriental	9	(0)
2016–2017	ETSV Weiche	13	(1)
2017–2018	Cova da Piedade	5	(1)
2019	Ottawa Fury	14	(0)
- * Club domestic league appearances and goals as of 11 September 2019

Thiago Schmidel de Freitas (born 13 April 1987) is a Brazilian footballer.

Freitas has experience from AOT Alimos (A.O Trachones F.C.) where he played a half season in Greece's second division. Prior to Greece, de Freitas spent a year in Israel with Hapoel Nir Ramat HaSharon, collecting two goals and two assists in 18 matches. The well-travelled, 27-year-old central midfielder has played in a multiple countries that also include Hungary and Portugal.

"We've watched extensive video and highlight footage of Thiago," said former coach Colin Miller added. "He comes from an excellent background and an excellent football pedigree. There are players that I've spoken to from within our league that have said what a good player we are getting and we expect him to make an immediate impact. I think he'll be a terrific signing for us."

His playing career took him from Fluminense youth program to Europe, where he featured for clubs in Italy, Germany, Portugal, Hungary and Greece. He also had a stint with FC Edmonton in the NASL.
