= Nico Rittmeyer =

Professional footballer

Personal information
- Full name: Nicholas Rittmeyer
- Date of birth: 13 October 1993 (age 33)
- Place of birth: Savannah, Georgia, United States
- Height: 1.75 m (5 ft 9 in)
- Position: Attacking midfielder

Youth career
- South Carolina United

College career
Years	Team	Apps	(Gls)
2013	North Carolina Tar Heels	4	(0)
2014–2016	Charleston Cougars	51	(13)

Senior career*
Years	Team	Apps	(Gls)
2016	South Georgia Tormenta	13	(3)
2017–2022	Charleston Battery	82	(7)

International career^{‡}
2021–2022	Guatemala	4	(1)
- * Club domestic league appearances and goals as of 2 November 2021 ‡ National team caps and goals as of 3 April 2021

Nicholas “Nico” Rittmeyer (born 13 October 1993) is a former professional footballer who played as an attacking midfielder for USL Championship club Charleston Battery. Born in the United States, he played for the Guatemala national team. He was forced to retire at an early age after suffering an injury.

== Career ==
=== Professional ===
Rittmeyer played four years of college soccer, starting at the University of North Carolina at Chapel Hill in 2013, before transferring to the College of Charleston in 2014.

Rittmeyer also played with USL PDL side South Georgia Tormenta in 2016.

Rittmeyer signed with United Soccer League club Charleston Battery on 22 March 2017. He made his professional debut on 14 June 2017 as an 82nd-minute substitute during a 3–2 loss to Atlanta United FC in the Lamar Hunt U.S. Open Cup.

=== International ===
On 29 October 2020, Rittmeyer received his first call-up to the Guatemala senior national team. He made his debut on 23 January 2021.
