= Ataullah Guerra =

Trinidad and Tobago footballer

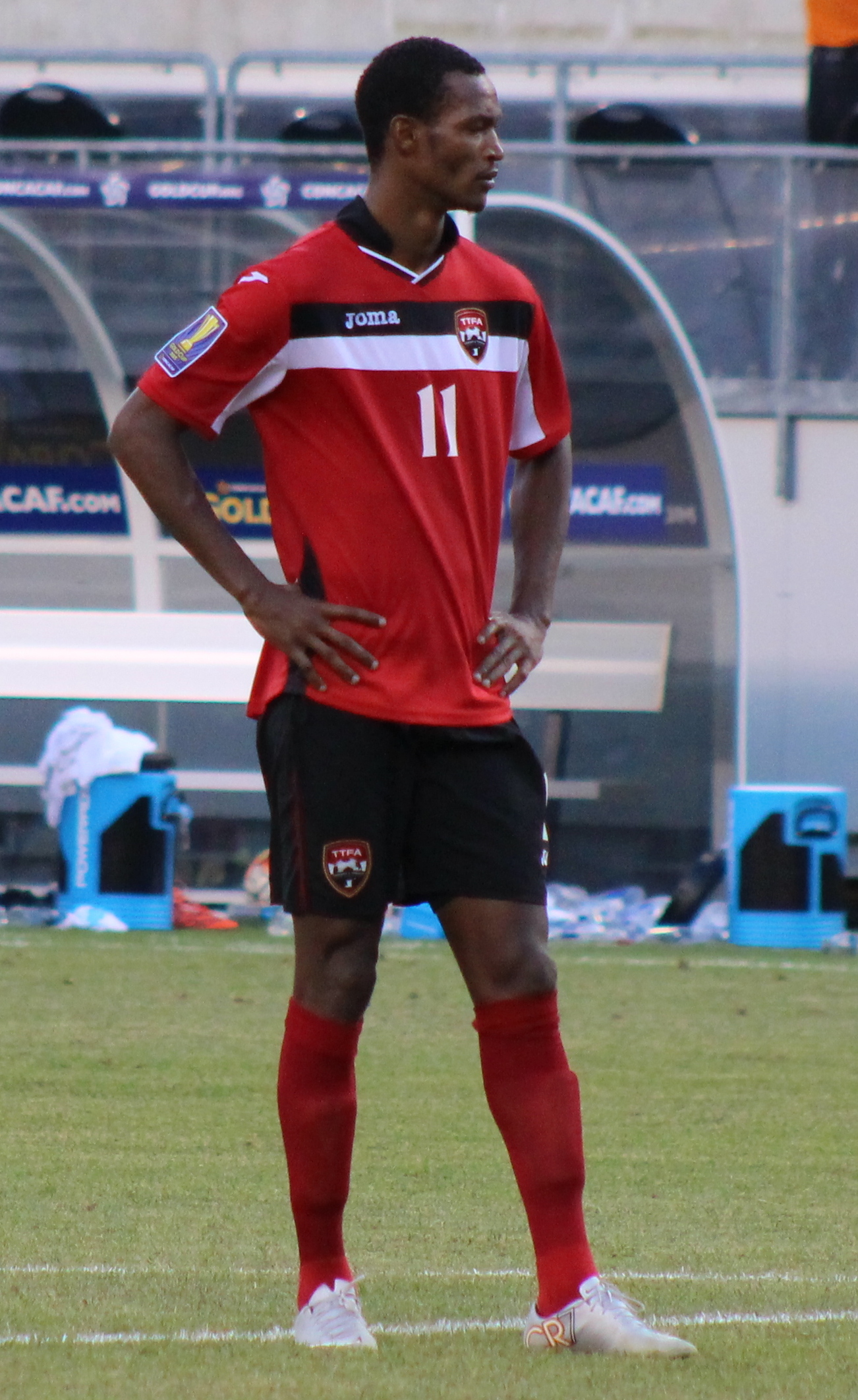
- Guerra playing for Trinidad and Tobago in 2015

Personal information
- Date of birth: 14 November 1987 (age 38)
- Place of birth: Laventille, Trinidad and Tobago
- Height: 1.90 m (6 ft 3 in)
- Position: Midfielder

Senior career*
Years	Team	Apps	(Gls)
2007–2011	San Juan Jabloteh		
2011–2013	Caledonia AIA		
2013	RoPS	20	(1)
2014–2015	Central FC		
2016–2019	Charleston Battery	90	(26)

International career^{‡}
2008–2019	Trinidad and Tobago	47	(8)
- * Club domestic league appearances and goals as of 21 October 2019 ‡ National team caps and goals as of 17 November 2019

Ataullah Guerra (born 14 November 1987) is a Trinidadian international footballer.

== International career ==
=== International goals ===
Scores and results list Trinidad and Tobago's goal tally first.

No	Date	Venue	Opponent	Score	Result	Competition
1.	18 November 2012	Dwight Yorke Stadium, Bacolet, Trinidad and Tobago	Cuba	1–0	1–0	2012 Caribbean Cup qualification
2.	15 November 2013	Montego Bay Sports Complex, Montego Bay, Jamaica	Jamaica	1–0	1–0	Friendly
3.	19 November 2013	Hasely Crawford Stadium, Port of Spain, Trinidad and Tobago	Jamaica	1–0	2–0	Friendly
4.	10 October 2014	Ato Boldon Stadium, Couva, Trinidad and Tobago	Saint Lucia	1–0	2–0	2014 Caribbean Cup qualification
5.	13 November 2014	Montego Bay Sports Complex, Montego Bay, Jamaica	French Guiana	4–2	4–2	2014 Caribbean Cup
6.	6 September 2018	Estadi Montilivi, Girona, Spain	United Arab Emirates	1–0	2–0	Friendly
7.	10 November 2019	Ato Boldon Stadium, Couva, Trinidad and Tobago	Anguilla	3–0	15–0	Friendly
8.	10 November 2019	Ato Boldon Stadium, Couva, Trinidad and Tobago	Anguilla	10–0	15–0	Friendly
