= Angelo Kelly-Rosales =

Honduran footballer (born 1993)

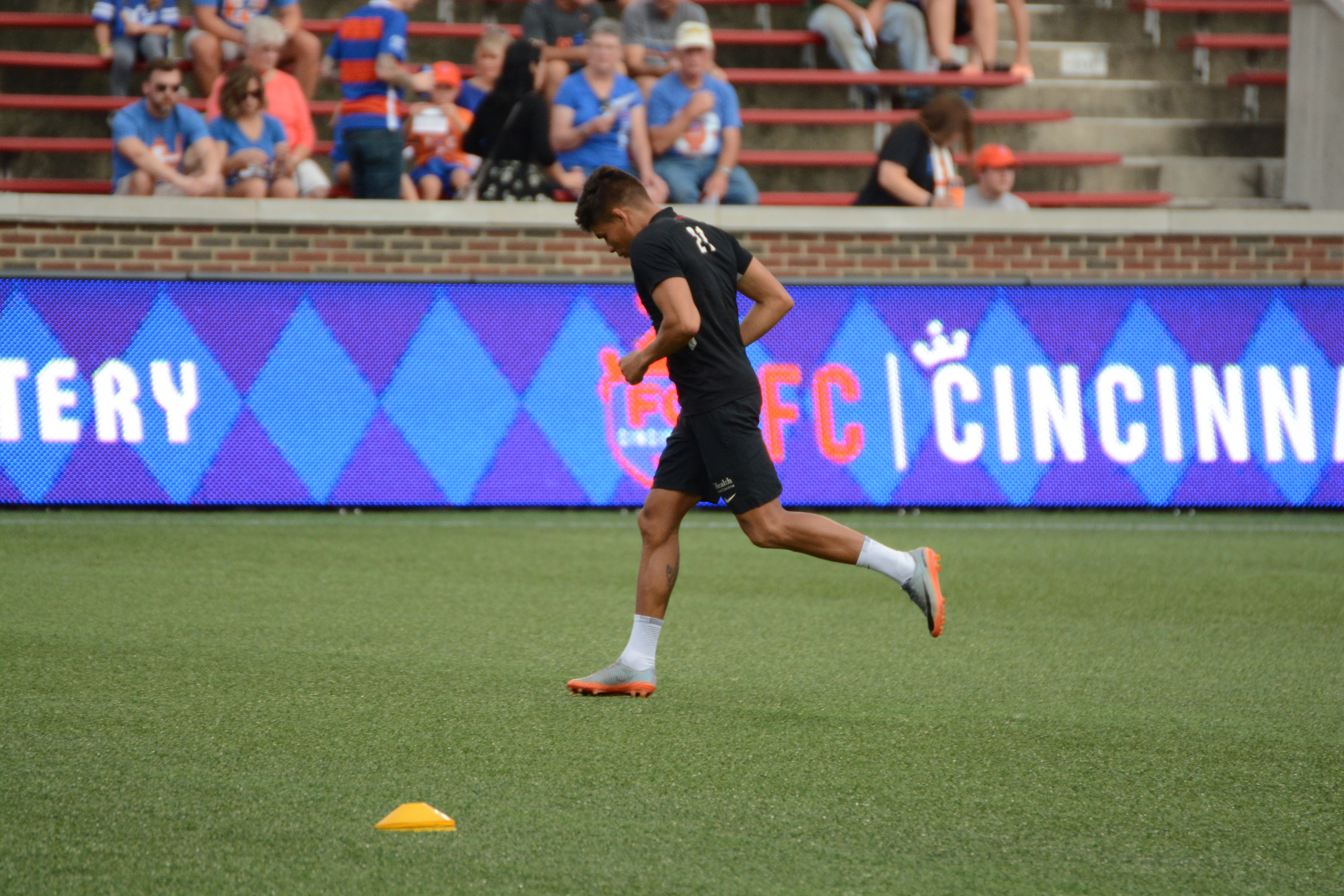
- Kelly-Rosales with Charleston Battery in 2018

Personal information
- Date of birth: January 25, 1993 (age 33)
- Place of birth: Honduras
- Height: 5 ft 8 in (1.73 m)
- Position: Midfielder

Team information
- Current team: Chattanooga Red Wolves
- Number: 35

College career
Years	Team	Apps	(Gls)
2012–2015	William Penn Statesmen	75	(18)

Senior career*
Years	Team	Apps	(Gls)
2015	Thunder Bay Chill	13	(1)
2016	Odessa/Midland Sockers	13	(0)
2017	Mississippi Brilla	17	(1)
2018–2021	Charleston Battery	90	(0)
2022	Pittsburgh Riverhounds	23	(0)
2023–2025	One Knoxville	78	(7)
2026–	Chattanooga Red Wolves	28	(2)
- * Club domestic league appearances and goals as of October 31, 2026

Angelo Kelly-Rosales (born 25 January 1993) is a Honduran professional footballer who plays as a midfielder for Chattanooga Red Wolves.

== Early life ==
Kelly-Rosales was born in Honduras, but grew up in Ottumwa, Iowa in the United States.

== Career ==
=== College ===
Kelly-Rosales played four years of college soccer at William Penn University between 2012 and 2015, making 75 appearances, scoring 18 goals and tallying 20 assists.

=== Semi-professional ===
Following college, Kelly-Rosales appeared in the Premier Development League with Thunder Bay Chill in 2015, Midland/Odessa Sockers in 2016 and Mississippi Brilla in 2017.

=== Professional ===
In March 2018, Kelly-Rosales signed with United Soccer League club Charleston Battery. He made his professional debut on March 24, 2018, as an injury-time substitute in a 1–0 win over Penn FC.

Kelly-Rosales made 17 appearances in 2020. He was one of four Battery players to appear in all 17 matches during the campaign. Kelly finished second on the team in long pass success rate at 64.4% and provided a team-high three assists, tied with AJ Paterson, in his third season in Charleston.

On January 24, 2022, Kelly-Rosales signed with USL Championship side Pittsburgh Riverhounds.

On December 13, 2022, Kelly-Rosales joined USL League One side One Knoxville SC.
