= Ian Svantesson =

American soccer player

Personal information
- Full name: Ian Niklas Svantesson
- Date of birth: August 31, 1993 (age 33)
- Place of birth: Orlando, Florida, United States
- Height: 1.98 m (6 ft 6 in)
- Position: Forward

College career
Years	Team	Apps	(Gls)
2012–2015	UAB Blazers	74	(16)

Senior career*
Years	Team	Apps	(Gls)
2013–2015	Orlando City U-23	23	(3)
2016	Rayo OKC	6	(1)
2017	Tulsa Roughnecks	30	(11)
2018–2019	Charleston Battery	43	(8)
- * Club domestic league appearances and goals as of October 21, 2019

Ian Niklas Svantesson (born August 31, 1993) is an American soccer player.

== Career ==
=== College career ===
Svantesson played four years of college soccer at the University of Alabama at Birmingham between 2012 and 2015. While at college, Svantesson also appeared for Premier Development League side Orlando City U-23.

=== Professional career ===
Svantesson signed with North American Soccer League side Rayo OKC on February 3, 2016, for their inaugural season in 2016.

On December 12, 2017, Svantesson signed with Charleston Battery.

== Personal life ==
His father is the retired professional tennis player Tobias Svantesson.
