= Brian Anunga =

Cameroonian footballer (born 1996)

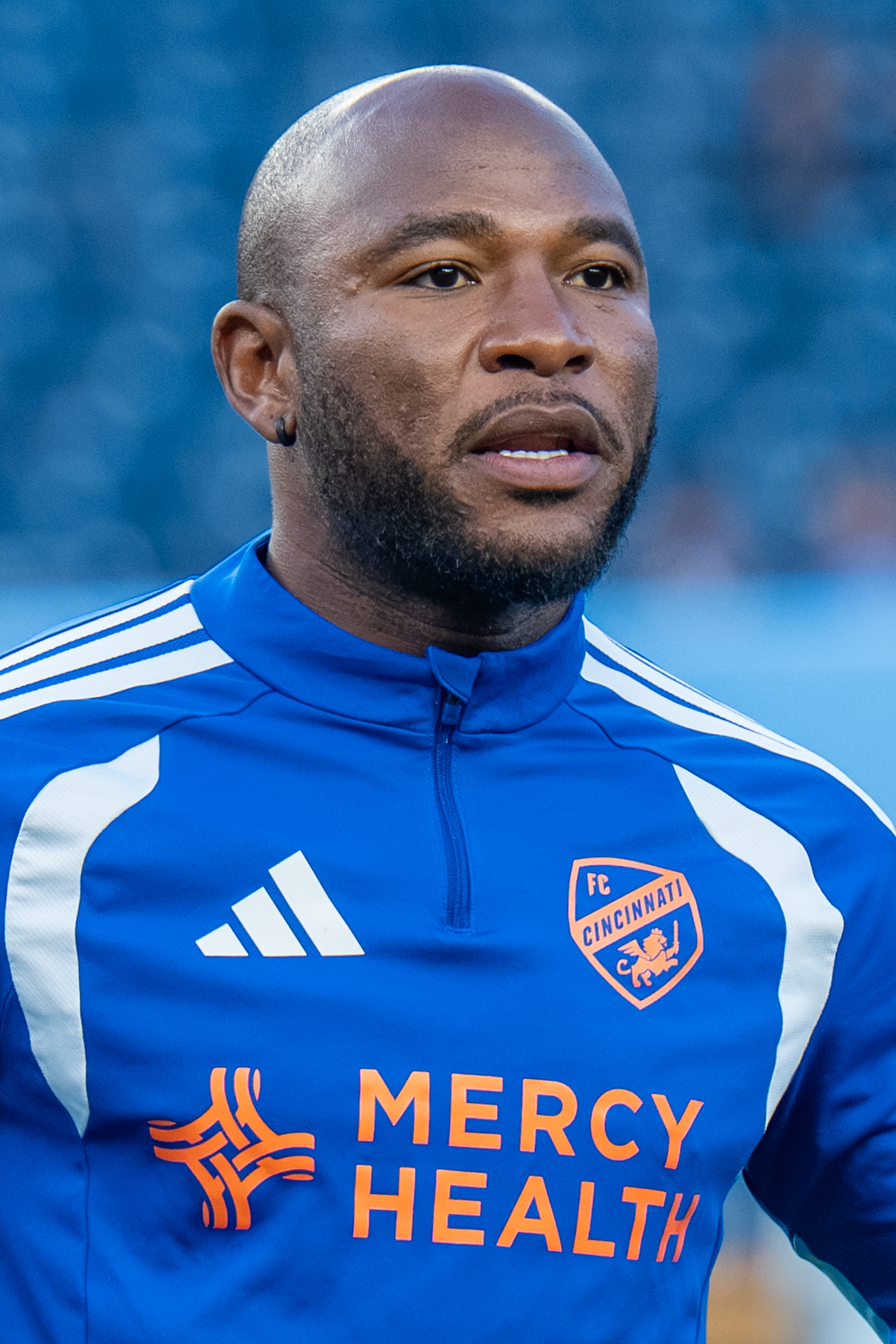
- Anunga with FC Cincinnati in 2026

Personal information
- Full name: Tah Brian Anunga
- Date of birth: 10 August 1996 (age 30)
- Place of birth: Yaoundé, Cameroon
- Height: 1.80 m (5 ft 11 in)
- Position: Midfielder

Team information
- Current team: FC Cincinnati
- Number: 27

Senior career*
Years	Team	Apps	(Gls)
2014	Rainbow Bamenda		
2015	Wilmington Hammerheads	5	(0)
2016	Carolina Dynamo	12	(1)
2017–2019	Charleston Battery	87	(7)
2020–2024	Nashville SC	109	(1)
2023	→ Huntsville City (loan)	1	(0)
2025–	FC Cincinnati	40	(0)
- * Club domestic league appearances and goals as of 16:52, 2 August 2026 (UTC)

Tah Brian Anunga (born 10 August 1996) is a Cameroonian professional footballer who plays as a midfielder for FC Cincinnati of Major League Soccer.

== Club career ==
=== Professional ===
==== Wilmington Hammerheads ====
Anunga joined United Soccer League club Wilmington Hammerheads on 29 April 2015.

==== Carolina Dynamo ====
Anunga joined Carolina Dynamo of USL League 2.

==== Charleston Battery ====
On 16 March 2017, Anunga joined United Soccer League Club Charleston Battery. Anunga was voted the club's most valuable player and made the USL All-League First Team in 2018.

==== Nashville SC ====
On 15 January 2020, Anunga joined Major League Soccer expansion side Nashville SC ahead of the 2020 season. He was released by Nashville following their 2024 season.

==== FC Cincinnati ====
On 13 January 2025, Anunga was signed by FC Cincinnati to a contract through the 2025 season with a club option for 2026.

== International career ==
Anunga has represented Cameroon at the U17, U20 and U23 levels while being a captain at the U20 level.
