= Wal Fall =

German footballer

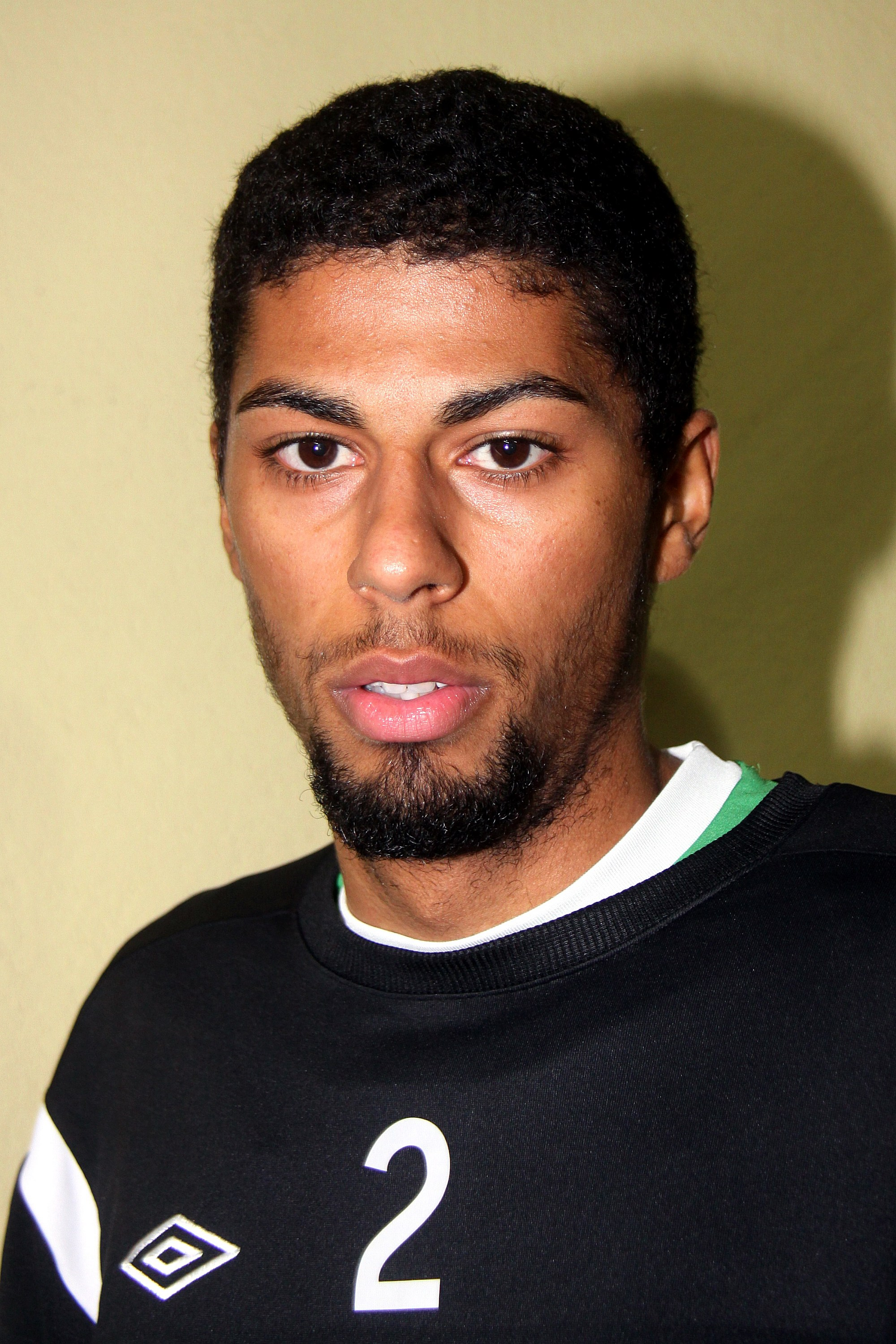

Personal information
- Date of birth: 8 September 1992 (age 34)
- Place of birth: Frankfurt, Germany
- Height: 1.90 m (6 ft 3 in)
- Positions: Midfielder; defender

Team information
- Current team: Arminia Ludwigshafen
- Number: 24

Youth career
- TSV 1875 Bonames
- SG Hoechst
- VfB Unterliederbach
- –2009: FSV Mainz 05
- 2009–2010: SV Wehen Wiesbaden

Senior career*
Years	Team	Apps	(Gls)
2010–2011	SV Wehen Wiesbaden	1	(0)
2011–2012	1. FC Nuremberg II	27	(3)
2012–2013	SV Waldhof Mannheim	19	(1)
2013–2015	SC Austria Lustenau	40	(3)
2015	BSV Schwarz-Weiß Rehden	14	(1)
2016–2017	Rochester Rhinos	53	(13)
2018	Saint Louis FC	22	(5)
2019	Ottawa Fury	30	(10)
2020	Saint Louis FC	15	(2)
2021	Oakland Roots	24	(4)
2023–	Arminia Ludwigshafen	23	(3)
- * Club domestic league appearances and goals as of 2 June 2024

Wal Fall (born 8 September 1992) is a German footballer who plays for Arminia Ludwigshafen.

== Personal ==
Fall is a cousin of USMNT player Jermaine Jones. Saint Louis FC folded following the 2020 USL Championship season.
