= Vincenzo Candela =

Colombian footballer (born 1994)

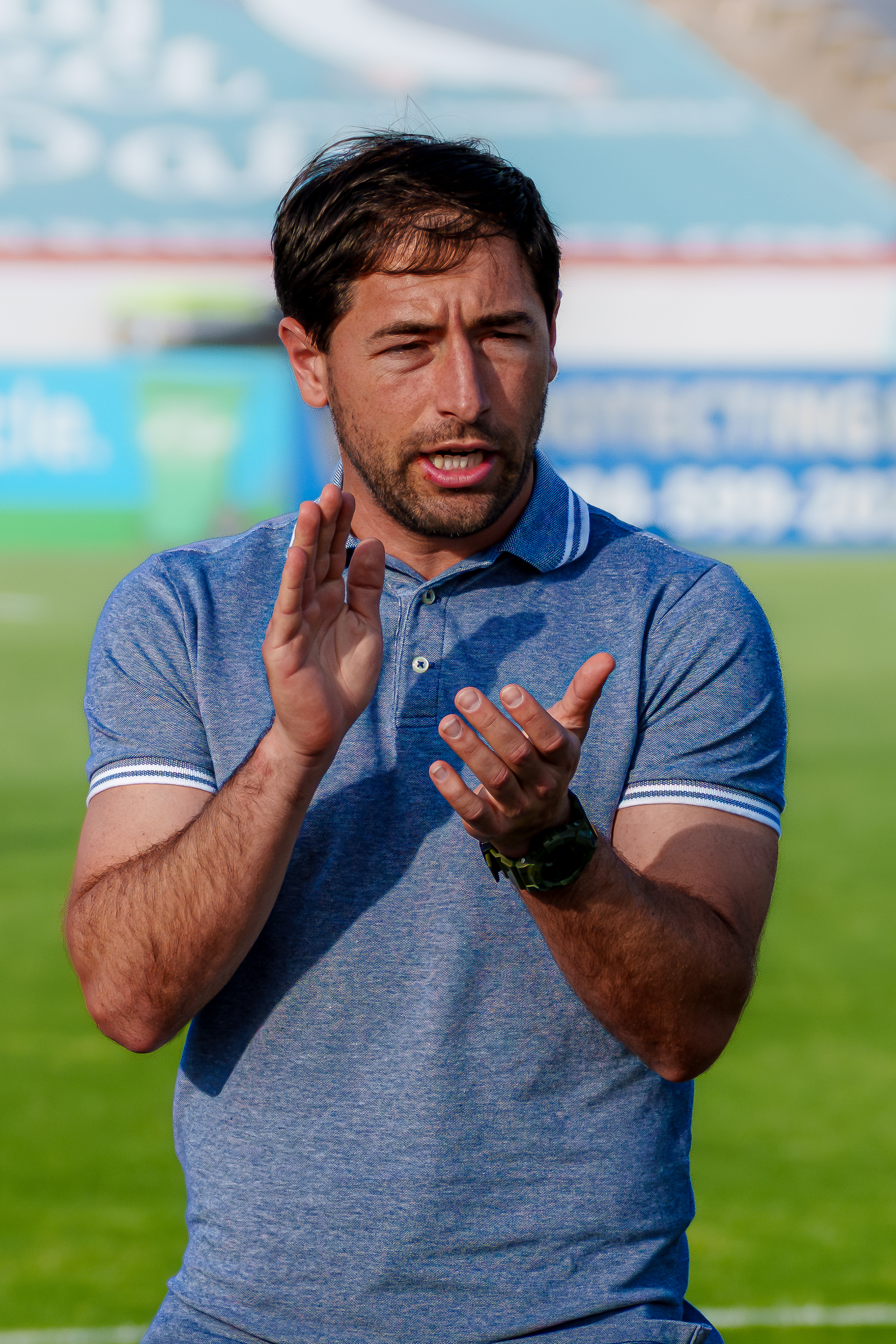
- Candela with Union Omaha in 2026

Personal information
- Date of birth: 28 September 1994 (age 32)
- Place of birth: Bogotá, Colombia
- Height: 5 ft 7 in (1.70 m)
- Position: Midfielder

Youth career
- 2012–2013: Real

Senior career*
Years	Team	Apps	(Gls)
2013–2014	Alemannia Aachen II	16	(2)
2014–2015	Eupen	0	(0)
2016	Atlético Huila	3	(0)
2017	Llaneros	3	(0)
2018–2019	Charleston Battery	51	(1)
2020	New York Cosmos	4	(0)
2021	South Georgia Tormenta	20	(0)
2022	Richmond Kickers	16	(0)
2023	Detroit City	1	(0)
2023	Boden	10	(0)

Managerial career
- 2023–2025: Union Omaha (assistant)
- 2025–: Union Omaha
- * Club domestic league appearances and goals as of 9 July 2025

Vincenzo Marco Antonio Nicola Constantino Candela López (born 28 September 1994) is a retired Colombian footballer who played as a midfielder. He is currently the interim manager of USL League One team Union Omaha.

== Early life ==
His father is Italian and his mother is Colombian.

== Playing career ==
Candela spent time in Europe with Real in Portugal, Alemannia Aachen in Germany, and Eupen in Belgium, before moving back to Colombia in 2016 with Atlético Huila and later Llaneros.

Candela returned to the United States when he signed with United Soccer League club Charleston Battery on 20 February 2018, following a successful open tryout appearance. He made his professional debut in the USL on 24 March 2018 in a 1–0 win over Penn FC.

On 21 May 2021, Candela signed with South Georgia Tormenta of USL League One.

Candela moved to USL League One side Richmond Kickers on 9 February 2022.

On 23 March 2023, Candela made the move to USL Championship side Detroit City for their 2023 season.

== Coaching career ==
Following the conclusion of his playing career, he joined the coaching staff of USL League One team Union Omaha, serving as an assistant to head coach Dominic Casciato. When Casciato departed the club to become manager of the Tampa Bay Rowdies, Candela was appointed interim manager.
