= Kotaro Higashi =

Japanese footballer

Personal information
- Full name: Kotaro Higashi
- Date of birth: 21 September 1989 (age 37)
- Place of birth: Japan
- Height: 1.68 m (5 ft 6 in)
- Position: Attacking midfielder

Senior career*
Years	Team	Apps	(Gls)
2012–2015	Sportfreunde Eisbachtal	98	(27)
2016	Bonnyrigg White Eagles		
2017–2019	Charleston Battery	82	(3)
- * Club domestic league appearances and goals as of 21 October 2019

Kotaro Higashi is a Japanese footballer who plays as a midfielder.

== Career ==
=== Professional ===
Higashi began his career with German club Sportfreunde Eisbachtal.

Following his time in Germany, he played a year with semi-pro Australian team Bonnyrigg White Eagles FC.

Higashi joined United Soccer League club Charleston Battery on 16 March 2017.
