= Jarad van Schaik =

American soccer player

Personal information
- Full name: Jarad Anthony van Schaik
- Date of birth: December 11, 1988 (age 37)
- Place of birth: Portland, Oregon, U.S.
- Height: 6 ft 1 in (1.85 m)
- Positions: Defender; midfielder

Youth career
- Southside SC
- –2007: FC Portland

College career
Years	Team	Apps	(Gls)
2007–2010	Portland Pilots	77	(14)

Senior career*
Years	Team	Apps	(Gls)
2009–2010	Portland Timbers U23s	15	(1)
2011–2012	Puerto Rico Islanders	38	(3)
2013–2015	Charleston Battery	78	(3)
2016	Rayo OKC	17	(0)
2017–2021	Charleston Battery	95	(3)
- * Club domestic league appearances and goals as of November 2, 2021

Jarad Anthony van Schaik (born December 11, 1988) is an American professional soccer player who plays as a defender or midfielder.

== College and amateur ==
Van Schaik grew up in Tualatin, Oregon, attended Tualatin High School, and won state titles with club teams Southside SC in 2000 and FC Portland in 2002 and 2006 before going on to play four years of college soccer at the University of Portland. He was voted to the West Coast Conference All-Freshman Team as a freshman in 2007 and was named to the All-WCC First Team as a junior in 2009 and as a senior in 2010. van Schaik led the team with eight goals and three assists his senior year and finished his college career with 14 goals in 77 games for the Pilots.

During his college years, van Schaik played in the Premier Development League with Portland Timbers U23s and scored the club's first ever goal in a competitive match, a 2–2 tie with Victoria Highlanders on May 9, 2009.

== Club career ==
Van Schaik was drafted in the third round (52nd overall) of the 2011 MLS SuperDraft by Real Salt Lake and trained with the team throughout the Major League Soccer preseason, but was not offered a contract by the team. Instead, van Schaik signed a contract to play for Puerto Rico Islanders of the North American Soccer League. He made his professional debut on May 14, 2011, in a 7–0 victory over Surinamese club Walking Boyz Company in the 2011 CFU Club Championship.

In 2013, van Schaik signed with Charleston Battery of the USL. At the beginning of the 2015 season, van Schaik was named as the club's captain.

On February 10, 2016, van Schaik signed for newly formed NASL club Rayo OKC.

Van Schaik returned to Charleston on July 17, 2017.
