= 2018 Atlanta United 2 season =

Atlanta United 2
2018 season
- Owner: Arthur Blank
- President: Darren Eales
- Head coach: Scott Donnelly
- USL: 14th
- USL Playoffs: DNQ
- Top goalscorer: League: Jon Gallagher (6); All: Jon Gallagher (6)
- Highest home attendance: 5,615 (Mar. 24 vs. New York Red Bulls II)
- Lowest home attendance: 1,269 (October 3 vs. Tampa Bay Rowdies)
- Average home league attendance: 2,597

The 2018 Atlanta United 2 season was the club's first year of existence, their first season in the United Soccer League, the second tier of the American soccer pyramid.

== Players ==
As of October 14, 2018.
The squad of Atlanta United 2 will be composed of an unrestricted number of first-team players on loan to the reserve team, players signed to ATLUTD2, and Atlanta United Academy players. Academy players who appear in matches with ATLUTD2 will retain their college eligibility.

Contracted players
No.	Position	Nation	Player
1	GK	USA	Paul Christensen
2	DF	USA	Tyler Ruthven
3	DF	USA	A.J. Cochran
4	DF	ENG	Jack Metcalf
6	DF	USA	Andrew Kendall-Moullin
8	MF	USA	Kevin Barajas
10	FW	USA	Yosef Samuel
11	MF	CIV	Laurent Kissiedou
15	DF	GUM	Shawn Nicklaw
16	FW	BRA	Rodolfo
18	FW	USA	Devon Sandoval
33	GK	FRA	Nicolas Caraux
34	FW	USA	Diego Lopez
41	MF	HON	Alessandro Castro

First team players who have been loaned to ATLUTD2
No.	Position	Nation	Player
9	FW	JAM	Romario Williams
12	DF	USA	Miles Robinson
13	DF	VEN	José Hernández
14	DF	USA	Sal Zizzo
19	FW	USA	Brandon Vazquez
20	MF	USA	Chris Goslin
21	DF	USA	George Bello
22	DF	USA	Mikey Ambrose
23	MF	USA	Lagos Kunga
25	GK	USA	Alec Kann
26	FW	IRL	Jon Gallagher
27	GK	USA	Mitch Hildebrandt
28	MF	USA	Andrew Wheeler-Omiunu
29	MF	ENG	Oliver Shannon
30	MF	USA	Andrew Carleton
32	MF	GER	Kevin Kratz

Academy call-ups
No.	Position	Nat.	Player
35	DF	USA	Kendall Edwards
36	FW	USA	Jackson Conway
37	DF	USA	George Campbell
38	DF	USA	Charlie Asensio
39	DF	USA	Will Crain
40	GK	USA	Russell Shealy
42	FW	JAM	Chad Letts
43	MF	USA	Dylan Gaither
44	GK	USA	Justin Garces
45	MF	JAM	Blake White
46	MF	USA	Victor Pereyra-Zavala
47	DF	USA	Natnael McDonald
48	DF	USA	Luke Mitchell

== Player movement ==
=== In ===
No.	Pos.	Age	Player	Transferred From	Type	Notes	Date	Source
3	DF	33	(United States) A. J. Cochran	(United States) Saint Louis FC	Transfer		January 24, 2018	
34	FW	24	(United States) Diego Lopez	(United States) Golden State Force	Transfer		January 24, 2018	
4	DF	34	(England) Jack Metcalf	Unattatched	Transfer	Free agent	January 24, 2018	
10	FW	28	(United States) Yosef Samuel	(United States) Bethlehem Steel	Transfer		January 24, 2018	
15	DF	36	(Guam) Shawn Nicklaw	Unattatched	Transfer	Free agent	February 6, 2018	
33	GK	35	(France) Nicolas Caraux	(France) FC Versailles 78	Transfer		February 6, 2018	
8	MF	30	(United States) Kevin Barajas	(United States) University of Kentucky	Transfer		February 12, 2018	
1	GK	29	(United States) Paul Christensen	(United States) University of Portland	Transfer	Draft Pick	February 18, 2018	
6	DF	31	(United States) Andrew Kendall-Moullin	(United States) San Antonio FC	Transfer		February 18, 2018	
11	MF	27	(Ivory Coast) Laurent Kissiedou	(United States) Atlanta United Academy	Transfer		February 18, 2018	
18	FW	34	(United States) Devon Sandoval	Unattached	Transfer	Free agent	March 22, 2018	
31	MF	27	(United States) Jose Carranza	(United States) North Carolina FC	Transfer		March 22, 2018	
41	MF	26	(Honduras) Alessandro Castro	(United States) Atlanta United Academy	Transfer		July 5, 2018	
2	DF	37	(United States) Tyler Ruthven	Unattached	Transfer	Free agent	August 14, 2018	
16	FW	32	(Brazil) Rodolfo	(United States) Fresno FC	Loan		September 10, 2018	

=== Out ===
No.	Pos.	Age	Player	Transferred To	Type	Notes	Date	Source
31	MF	27	(United States) Jose Carranza	(United States) Louisville City	Transfer		August 20, 2018	

=== Academy Leaves for College ===
No.	Pos.	Age	Player	College	Date
38	DF	26	(United States) Carlos Asensio	Clemson	August 10, 2018
39	DF	25	(United States) Will Crain	Brown	August 10, 2018
40	GK	26	(United States) Russell Shealy	Maryland	August 10, 2018
44	GK	25	(United States) Justin Garces	UCLA	August 10, 2018
45	MF	25	(Jamaica) Blake White	UAB	August 10, 2018
46	MF	27	(United States) Victor Pereyra-Zavala	Georgia State	August 10, 2018

== Competitions ==
=== USL regular season ===
==== Standings ====
Pos	Team	Pld	W	D	L	GF	GA	GD	Pts
12	Tampa Bay Rowdies	34	11	8	15	44	44	0	41
13	Penn FC	34	9	10	15	38	47	−9	37
14	Atlanta United 2	34	7	10	17	37	72	−35	31
15	Richmond Kickers	34	6	4	24	30	80	−50	22
16	Toronto FC II	34	4	6	24	42	77	−35	18

Source: 2018 USL standings
Rules for classification: 1) total wins; 2) total goal differential; 3) total goals scored; 4) points earned against top four Conference finishers; 5) disciplinary points; 6) coin toss or drawing of lots

==== Results summary ====
Overall								Home						Away					
Pld	W	D	L	GF	GA	GD	Pts	W	D	L	GF	GA	GD	W	D	L	GF	GA	GD
34	7	10	17	37	72	−35	31	5	7	5	25	36	−11	2	3	12	12	36	−24

Last updated: October 14, 2018.
Source: USL

==== Results by matchday ====
Matchday	1	2	3	4	5	6	7	8	9	10	11	12	13	14	15	16	17	18	19	20	21	22	23	24	25	26	27	28	29	30	31	32	33	34
Stadium	H	A	H	H	H	A	A	A	H	A	A	A	A	H	H	A	A	H	A	A	A	A	H	H	A	A	A	H	H	H	H	H	H	H
Result	W	D	D	D	L	L	L	L	W	L	L	D	L	D	L	L	W	D	L	L	D	L	L	D	W	W	L	L	L	L	D	W	D	W

Updated to match(es) played on October 14, 2018. Source: USL
A = Away; H = Home; W = Win; D = Draw; L = Loss

==== Matches ====
Win Draw Loss Upcoming

March 24, 2018 USL 1	Atlanta United 2	3–1	New York Red Bulls II	Lawrenceville, Georgia
7:00 PM EDT	Samuel 25'; Gallagher 41' (pen.), 51'	Report	Echevarria (yellow card) 23'; White 32'; Murphy (yellow card) 89'	Stadium: Coolray Field; Attendance: 5,615; Referee: Sergii Demianchuk

March 31, 2018 USL 2	Charlotte Independence	2–2	Atlanta United 2	Matthews, North Carolina
7:00 PM EDT	Martínez (yellow card) 32'; Herrera 37', 85'; George (yellow card) 61'	Report	Jung-soo 28' (o.g.); Kunga 82'	Stadium: Sportsplex at Matthews; Attendance: 1,375; Referee: Daniel Gutierrez

April 8, 2018 USL 3	Atlanta United 2	1–1	Penn FC	Lawrenceville, Georgia
4:00 PM EDT	Gallagher 63'; Shannon (yellow card) 75'	Report	Tribbett (yellow card) 8'; Heinemann 31'; Menjivar (yellow card) 73'	Stadium: Coolray Field; Attendance: 2,861; Referee: Elton Garcia

April 21, 2018 USL 4	Atlanta United 2	1–1	Louisville City	Lawrenceville, Georgia
7:00 PM EDT	Shannon (yellow card) 51'; Carleton 90+1' (pen.)	Report	Totsch (yellow card) 44'; Lancaster 66'; Williams (yellow card) 84'; Ownby (yellow card) 90'	Stadium: Coolray Field; Attendance: 4,135; Referee: Elvis Osmanovic

April 24, 2018 USL 5	Atlanta United 2	0–3	Charleston Battery	Lawrenceville, Georgia
7:00 PM EDT		Report	Svantesson 33'; Wild 51', 85'; Rittmeyer (yellow card) 71'; Tah Anunga (yellow card) 81'	Stadium: Coolray Field; Attendance: 2,047; Referee: Rubiel Vazquez

April 28, 2018 USL 6	Pittsburgh Riverhounds	1–0	Atlanta United 2	Pittsburgh, Pennsylvania
7:00 PM EDT	Brett 26'; François (yellow card) 61'	Report	Robinson (yellow card) 75' (yellow-red card) 82'; Metcalf (yellow card) 84'	Stadium: Highmark Stadium; Attendance: 1,998; Referee: Kevin Broadley

May 5, 2018 USL 7	FC Cincinnati	4–2	Atlanta United 2	Cincinnati, Ohio
7:00 PM EDT	König 26'; Ledesma 28', 46'; Keinan (yellow card) 30'; Bone 39'	Report	Gallagher 31'; Kissiedou (yellow card) 37', (goal) 41'; Carleton (yellow card) 87'	Stadium: Nippert Stadium; Attendance: 22,532; Referee: Guido Gonzalez Jr.

May 12, 2018 USL 8	Ottawa Fury	2–0	Atlanta United 2	Ottawa, Ontario
2:00 PM EDT	Dos Santos 26'; Haworth 35'; Dixon (yellow card) 63'; Taylor (yellow card) 82'	Report	Cochran (yellow card) 10'; Edwards (yellow card) 34'; Shannon (yellow card) 53'	Stadium: TD Place Stadium; Attendance: 4,296; Referee: Yusri Rudolf

May 16, 2018 USL 9	Atlanta United 2	5–4	Toronto FC II	Lawrenceville, Georgia
7:00 PM EDT	Ambrose 5', 40'; Williams 27', (yellow card) 76'; Shannon (yellow card) 31'; Gallagher 50'; Vazquez 80'	Report	Akinola 17'; Uccello (yellow card) 32', (goal) 48', 61'; Boskovic (yellow card) 39'; Daniels 44' (pen.); Onkony (yellow card) 56'; Dunn-Johnson (yellow card) 87'; Kübel (yellow card) 90+6'	Stadium: Coolray Field; Attendance: 2,061; Referee: Jon Freemon

May 19, 2018 USL 10	Louisville City	2–1	Atlanta United 2	Louisville, Kentucky
7:30 PM EDT	Lancaster 24'; Craig (yellow card) 80'; Souahy (yellow card) 85'; Ilić 90+1' (pen.)	Report	Kissiedou 31' (yellow card) 69'; Carranza (yellow card) 72'; Nicklaw (yellow card) 90'; Gallagher (yellow card) 90+2'	Stadium: Louisville Slugger Field; Attendance: 8,683; Referee: Ismir Pekmic

May 25, 2018 USL 11	North Carolina FC	4–0	Atlanta United 2	Cary, North Carolina
7:00 PM	Ewolo 7'; Crain 21' (o.g.); Bekker (yellow card) 45+1'; Ríos 52'; Lomis 89'	Report	Wheeler-Omiunu (yellow card) 72'; Kendall-Moullin (yellow card) 73'	Stadium: Sahlen's Stadium at WakeMed Soccer Park; Attendance: 3,710; Referee: Lorant Varga

June 2, 2018 USL 12	Tampa Bay Rowdies	0–0	Atlanta United 2	St. Petersburg, Florida
7:30 PM EDT	Vingaard (yellow card) 25'; Schäfer (red card) 44'; Cole (yellow card) 90'	Report	Crain (yellow card) 32' (yellow-red card) 40'; Metcalf (yellow card) 43'; Kendall-Moullin (yellow card) 90+2'	Stadium: Al Lang Stadium; Attendance: 5,953; Referee: Jonathan Bilinski

June 9, 2018 USL 13	Indy Eleven	2–0	Atlanta United 2	Indianapolis, Indiana
7:00 PM EDT	Watson 30'; Mitchell 55'; Mitchell (yellow card) 78'	Report		Stadium: Lucas Oil Stadium; Attendance: 10,034; Referee: Michael Radchuk

June 13, 2018 USL 14	Atlanta United 2	1–1	Charlotte Independence	Lawrenceville, Georgia
7:00 PM EDT	Carleton (yellow card) 50'; Dykstra 79' (o.g.)	Report	Zayed 6'; Johnson (yellow card) 58'	Stadium: Coolray Field; Attendance: 2,087; Referee: Greg Dopka

June 30, 2018 USL 15	Nashville SC	3–0	Atlanta United 2	Nashville, Tennessee
8:30 PM EDT	Allen 18'; Winn 45+3'; Moloto 84'	Report	Cochran (yellow card) 88'	Stadium: First Tennessee Park; Attendance: 8,815; Referee: Luis Guardia

July 6, 2018 USL 16	New York Red Bulls II	6–1	Atlanta United 2	Montclair, New Jersey
7:00 PM EDT	Lema 17'; Moreno 30'; Kutler 56'; Ndam 71'; Tinari 73'; Cásseres Jr. 90+1' (pen.)	Report	Nicklaw (yellow card) 70'; Scarlett 81' (o.g.); Kendall-Moullin (yellow card) 90'	Stadium: MSU Soccer Park at Pittser Field; Attendance: 698; Referee: Thomas Snyder

July 11, 2018 USL 17	Atlanta United 2	2–1	Bethlehem Steel	Lawrenceville, Georgia
7:00 PM EDT	Robinson (yellow card) 18'; Vazquez 25'; Shannon 50'	Report	Aubrey (yellow card) 43'; Jones 87'	Stadium: Coolray Field; Attendance: 1,658; Referee: Sergii Demianchuk

July 21, 2018 USL 18	Richmond Kickers	1–1	Atlanta United 2	Richmond, Virginia
7:00 PM EDT	Shriver 38'; Boehme (yellow card) 45+1'; Thomsen (yellow card) 50'	Report	Kendall-Moullin (yellow card) 15'; Metcalf (yellow card) 33'; Gallagher 67'; Kissiedou (yellow card) 90+1'	Stadium: City Stadium; Attendance: 2,956; Referee: Bardhyl Pashaj

July 25, 2018 USL 19	Nashville SC	1–0	Atlanta United 2	Nashville, Tennessee
8:30 PM EDT	Davis (yellow card) 61'; Washington 80'	Report	Ambrose (yellow card) 15'; Kendall-Moullin (yellow card) 25'	Stadium: First Tennessee Park; Attendance: 8,729; Referee: Guido Gonzalez Jr.

July 29, 2018 USL 20	Bethlehem Steel	4–1	Atlanta United 2	Bethlehem, Pennsylvania
5:00 PM EDT	Mahoney 16'; Apodaca 36'; Moumbagna 71'; Aaronson 72'	Report	Metcalf (yellow card) 24'; Sandoval 40'; Cochran (yellow card) 76'	Stadium: Goodman Stadium; Attendance: 2,416; Referee: Eric Tattersall

August 7, 2018 USL 21	Atlanta United 2	1–1	Ottawa Fury	Kennesaw, Georgia
6:00 PM EDT	Edward 3' (o.g.)	Report	Oliveira 10'	Stadium: Fifth Third Bank Stadium; Attendance: 3,596; Referee: Eric Tattersall

August 11, 2018 USL 22	Charleston Battery	1–0	Atlanta United 2	Charleston, South Carolina
7:00 PM EDT	Okonkwo (yellow card) 7'; Svantesson 41' (pen.)	Report	Castro (yellow card) 26'	Stadium: MUSC Health Stadium; Attendance: 2,582; Referee: Lorant Varga

August 22, 2018 USL 23	Atlanta United 2	1–5	FC Cincinnati	Lawrenceville, Georgia
7:00 PM EDT	Bello (yellow card) 16'; Nicklaw 65'; Gallagher (yellow card) 90+1'	Report	Bone 18'; Albadawi 25', 55'; Konate (yellow card) 36'; Alashe (yellow card) 45+1', (goal) 53'; Welshman 87'	Stadium: Coolray Field; Attendance: 1,638; Referee: Jonathan Bilinski

August 25, 2018 USL 24	Atlanta United 2	1–1	Indy Eleven	Lawrenceville, Georgia
7:00 PM EDT	Kissiedou (yellow card) 29'; Gaither 90+6'	Report	Moses (yellow card) 45+1'; Ouimette 53'; Ring (yellow card) 69'	Stadium: Coolray Field; Attendance: 3,008; Referee: Greg Dopka

August 31, 2018 USL 25	Toronto FC II	1–2	Atlanta United 2	Toronto, Ontario
8:00 PM EDT	Mohammed (yellow card) 45+4'; Okello (yellow card) 45+5'; Srbely 90+3'	Report	Kunga 12', 52'; Ruthven (red card) 45+4'	Stadium: Lamport Stadium; Attendance: 196; Referee: Pierre-Luc Lauziere

September 8, 2018 USL 26	Penn FC	1–2	Atlanta United 2	Harrisburg, Pennsylvania
7:00 PM EDT	Tribbett 34', (yellow card) 77'; Bond (yellow card) 72'	Report	Sandoval 3'; Kendall-Moullin (yellow card) 31'; Carleton 41'; Bello (yellow card) 53'; Conway (yellow card) 82'; Kann (yellow card) 90'	Stadium: FNB Field; Attendance: 3,105; Referee: Lukasz Szpala

September 15, 2018 USL 27	Tampa Bay Rowdies	1–0	Atlanta United 2	St. Petersburg, Florida
7:30 PM EDT	Guenzatti 30'; Oduro (yellow card) 45+1'; Cole (yellow card) 87'	Report	Kissiedou (yellow card) 44'; Kendall-Moullin (yellow card) 51'; Shannon (yellow card) 79'	Stadium: Al Lang Stadium; Attendance: 6,045; Referee: Daniel Gutierrez

September 21, 2018 USL 28	Atlanta United 2	1–6	North Carolina FC	Lawrenceville, Georgia
7:00 PM EDT	Castro 8'	Report	Ewolo 3', 16', 33', 89'; Bekker 29'; Steinberger 42'; Smith (yellow card) 61'; Igbekoyi (yellow card) 71'	Stadium: Coolray Field; Attendance: 1,923; Referee: Sergii Demianchuk

September 26, 2018 USL 29	Atlanta United 2	0–2	Nashville SC	Lawrenceville, Georgia
7:00 PM EDT		Report	Mensah 7', (yellow card) 50'; Hume 64'	Stadium: Coolray Field; Attendance: 1,585; Referee: Elton Garcia

September 29, 2018 USL 30	Atlanta United 2	1–4	Louisville City	Lawrenceville, Georgia
7:00 PM EDT	Williams (yellow card) 44', (goal) 71'; Metcalf (yellow card) 89'	Report	Cochran 24' (o.g.), 69' (o.g.); Smith 37'; Davis IV 41'	Stadium: Coolray Field; Attendance: 2,718; Referee: Eric Tattersall

October 3, 2018 USL 31	Atlanta United 2	1–1	Tampa Bay Rowdies	Lawrenceville, Georgia
7:00 PM EDT	Robinson (yellow card) 60', (goal) 90+3'; Wheeler-Omiunu (yellow card) 62'; Shannon (yellow card) 65'; Carleton (yellow card) 83'; Kendall-Moullin (red card) 90+2'	Report	Morad (yellow card) 20'; Guenzatti 68'; Oduro (yellow card) 75'	Stadium: Coolray Field; Attendance: 1,269; Referee: Jon Freemon

October 7, 2018 USL 32	Atlanta United 2	2–1	Charleston Battery	Lawrenceville, Georgia
7:00 PM EDT	Williams 48', 65'; Carleton (yellow card) 64'	Report	Guerra 27'; Kelly-Rosales (yellow card) 56'; Wild (yellow card) 81'	Stadium: Coolray Field; Attendance: 3,304; Referee: Greg Dopka

October 10, 2018 USL 33	Atlanta United 2	1–1	Pittsburgh Riverhounds	Lawrenceville, Georgia
7:00 PM EDT	Kissiedou 52'	Report	Vancaeyezeele 27'; Roberts (yellow card) 43'; Lubahn (yellow card) 73'	Stadium: Coolray Field; Attendance: 1,319; Referee: Guido Gonzalez Jr.

October 13, 2018 USL 34	Atlanta United 2	3–2	Richmond Kickers	Lawrenceville, Georgia
7:00 PM EDT	Kunga 61', 69'; Shannon (yellow card) 65'; Sandoval 76'	Report	Gentile 80', 90+1'	Stadium: Coolray Field; Attendance: 3,334; Referee: Natalie Simon

== Statistics ==
=== Top scorers ===
As of October 14, 2018

Place	Position	Name	USL	Playoffs	Total
1	FW	(Republic of Ireland) Jon Gallagher	6	0	6
2	MF	(United States) Lagos Kunga	5	0	5
3	FW	(Jamaica) Romario Williams	4	0	4
4	MF	(Ivory Coast) Laurent Kissiedou	3	0	3
4	FW	(United States) Devon Sandoval	3	0	3
6	FW	(United States) Brandon Vazquez	2	0	2
6	DF	(United States) Mikey Ambrose	2	0	2
6	MF	(United States) Andrew Carleton	2	0	2
9	MF	(United States) Yosef Samuel	1	0	1
9	DF	(United States) Miles Robinson	1	0	1
9	DF	(Guam) Shawn Nicklaw	1	0	1
9	MF	(England) Oliver Shannon	1	0	1
9	MF	(Honduras) Alessandro Castro	1	0	1
9	MF	(United States) Dylan Gaither	1	0	1
Own Goals			4	0	4
Total			37	0	37

=== Appearances and goals ===
As of October 14, 2018

Numbers after plus-sign(+) denote appearances as a substitute.

No.	Pos	Nat	Player	Total		Regular season		Playoffs	
No.	Pos	Nat	Player	Apps	Goals	Apps	Goals	Apps	Goals
1	GK	(United States) USA	Paul Christensen	10	0	10	0	0	0
2	DF	(United States) USA	Tyler Ruthven	4	0	4	0	0	0
3	DF	(United States) USA	A. J. Cochran	30	0	30	0	0	0
4	DF	(England) ENG	Jack Metcalf	31	0	28+3	0	0	0
6	DF	(United States) USA	Andrew Kendall-Moullin	24	0	22+2	0	0	0
8	MF	(United States) USA	Kevin Barajas	13	0	7+6	0	0	0
9	FW	(Jamaica) JAM	Romario Williams	7	4	7	4	0	0
10	MF	(United States) USA	Yosef Samuel	15	1	12+3	1	0	0
11	MF	(Ivory Coast) CIV	Laurent Kissiedou	25	3	22+3	3	0	0
12	DF	(United States) USA	Miles Robinson	14	1	14	1	0	0
13	DF	(Venezuela) VEN	José Hernández	15	0	11+4	0	0	0
14	DF	(United States) USA	Sal Zizzo	1	0	1	0	0	0
15	DF	(Guam) GUM	Shawn Nicklaw	21	1	13+8	1	0	0
16	FW	(Brazil) BRA	Rodolfo	3	0	1+2	0	0	0
18	FW	(United States) USA	Devon Sandoval	25	3	14+11	3	0	0
19	FW	(United States) USA	Brandon Vazquez	6	2	5+1	2	0	0
20	MF	(United States) USA	Chris Goslin	21	0	15+6	0	0	0
21	DF	(United States) USA	George Bello	6	0	6	0	0	0
22	DF	(United States) USA	Mikey Ambrose	6	2	6	2	0	0
23	MF	(United States) USA	Lagos Kunga	31	5	18+13	5	0	0
25	GK	(United States) USA	Alec Kann	7	0	7	0	0	0
26	FW	(Ireland) EIR	Jon Gallagher	30	6	27+3	6	0	0
27	GK	(United States) USA	Mitch Hildebrandt	8	0	8	0	0	0
28	MF	(United States) USA	Andrew Wheeler-Omiunu	10	0	10	0	0	0
29	MF	(England) ENG	Oliver Shannon	27	1	25+2	1	0	0
30	MF	(United States) USA	Andrew Carleton	14	2	13+1	2	0	0
31	MF	(United States) USA	Jose Carranza	13	0	7+6	0	0	0
32	MF	(Germany) GER	Kevin Kratz	2	0	2	0	0	0
33	GK	(France) FRA	Nicolas Caraux	7	0	7	0	0	0
34	FW	(United States) USA	Diego Lopez	1	0	0+1	0	0	0
35	DF	(United States) USA	Kendall Edwards	4	0	4	0	0	0
36	FW	(United States) USA	Jackson Conway	11	0	4+7	0	0	0
37	DF	(United States) USA	George Campbell	0	0	0	0	0	0
38	DF	(United States) USA	Carlos Asensio	0	0	0	0	0	0
39	DF	(United States) USA	Will Crain	7	0	5+2	0	0	0
40	GK	(United States) USA	Russell Shealy	0	0	0	0	0	0
41	MF	(Honduras) HON	Alessandro Castro	12	1	7+5	1	0	0
42	FW	(United States) USA	Chad Letts	0	0	0	0	0	0
43	MF	(United States) USA	Dylan Gaither	4	1	0+4	1	0	0
44	GK	(United States) USA	Justin Garces	2	0	2	0	0	0
45	MF	(United States) USA	Blake White	1	0	0+1	0	0	0
46	MF	(United States) USA	Victor Pereyra-Zavala	1	0	0+1	0	0	0
47	DF	(United States) USA	Natnael McDonald	2	0	0+2	0	0	0
48	DF	(United States) USA	Luke Mitchell	1	0	0+1	0	0	0
