= 2019 Atlanta United 2 season =

Atlanta United 2
2019 season
- Owner: Arthur Blank
- President: Darren Eales
- Head coach: Stephen Glass
- Stadium: Fifth Third Bank Stadium
- USL Championship: 14th
- USL Playoffs: DNQ
- Top goalscorer: Bienvenue Kanakimana (7)
- Highest home attendance: League/All: 3,109 (May 4 vs. Nashville SC)
- Lowest home attendance: League/All: 1,015 (July 24 vs. Charlotte)
- Average home league attendance: 1,838
- Biggest win: 5–2 (October 9 vs. Bethlehem Steel)
- Biggest defeat: 1–8 (July 13 vs. NYRB II)

The 2019 Atlanta United 2 season was the team's second year of existence, their second season in the USL (now rebranded as the USL Championship), the second tier of the American soccer pyramid. It was their first season with home matches at Fifth Third Bank Stadium in Kennesaw, Georgia.

== Players ==
As of September 20, 2019.
The squad of Atlanta United 2 will be composed of an unrestricted number of first-team players on loan to the reserve team, players signed to ATLUTD2, and Atlanta United Academy players. Academy players who appear in matches with ATLUTD2 will retain their college eligibility.

Contracted players
No.	Position	Nation	Player
1	GK	USA	Paul Christensen
2	DF	USA	Tyler Ruthven
3	DF	PAN	Guillermo Benítez
4	DF	ENG	Jack Metcalf
5	DF	HON	Wesly Decas
6	DF	ENG	Laurence Wyke
8	MF	USA	Kevin Barajas
11	MF	CIV	Laurent Kissiedou
14	FW	USA	Jackson Conway
16	MF	HON	Alessandro Castro
24	GK	USA	Dylan Castanheira
29	MF	BDI	Bienvenue Kanakimana
31	MF	USA	Amir Bashti

First team players who have been loaned to ATLUTD2
No.	Position	Nation	Player
7	FW	BRA	Luiz Fernando
12	MF	ENG	Mo Adams
13	GK	USA	Brendan Moore
15	DF	VEN	José Hernández
19	FW	USA	Brandon Vazquez
20	DF	GUI	Florentin Pogba
21	DF	USA	George Bello
22	DF	USA	Mikey Ambrose
25	GK	USA	Alec Kann
28	MF	ENG	Dion Pereira
27	MF	USA	Chris Goslin
30	MF	USA	Andrew Carleton
32	MF	GER	Kevin Kratz
35	FW	NGA	Patrick Okonkwo
38	DF	ARG	Franco Escobar

Academy call-ups
No.	Position	Nat.	Player
34	DF	USA	Kendall Edwards
36	MF	USA	Will Vint
37	DF	USA	George Campbell
39	GK	USA	Marzuq Puckerin
39	MF	USA	Will Reilly
40	DF	USA	Brandon Clagette
41	DF	USA	Jordan Matthews
42	DF	USA	Garrison Tubbs

== Player movement ==
=== In ===
No.	Pos.	Age	Player	Transferred From	Type	Notes	Date	Source
7	FW	29	(Brazil) Luiz Fernando	(United States) Richmond Kickers	Transfer		November 19, 2018	
14	FW	24	(United States) Jackson Conway	(United States) Atlanta United Academy	Transfer		December 20, 2018	
24	GK	31	(United States) Dylan Castanheira	(United States) Columbia University	Transfer		January 11, 2019	
3	DF	27	(Panama) Guillermo Benítez	(Panama) Plaza Amador	Loan		January 31, 2019	
5	DF	27	(Honduras) Wesly Decas	(Costa Rica) FC Moravia	Loan		February 15, 2019	
6	MF	29	(England) Laurence Wyke	(United States) Furman University	Transfer		February 20, 2019	
29	MF	26	(Burundi) Bienvenue Kanakimana	(Czech Republic) MFK Vyškov	Loan		April 12, 2019	
31	MF	29	(United States) Amir Bashti	(United States) San Francisco Glens	Transfer	Draft Pick	August 22, 2019	

=== Out ===
No.	Pos.	Age	Player	Transferred To	Type	Notes	Date	Source
16	FW	32	(Brazil) Rodolfo	(United States) Fresno FC	Loan Return		November 30, 2018	
18	FW	35	(United States) Devon Sandoval	(United States) New Mexico United	Contract Expired		November 30, 2018	
6	DF	31	(United States) Andrew Kendall-Moullin	(United States) Chattanooga Red Wolves	Contract Expired		November 30, 2018	
15	DF	37	(Guam) Shawn Nicklaw	Free agent	Contract Expired		November 30, 2018	
3	DF	33	(United States) A. J. Cochran	(United States) Phoenix Rising	Option Declined		November 30, 2018	
33	GK	35	(France) Nicolas Caraux	(France) FC Versailles 78	Option Declined		November 30, 2018	
10	FW	29	(United States) Yosef Samuel	(Denmark) Hobro IK	Released		July 29, 2019	
7	FW	29	(Brazil) Luiz Fernando	(United States) Atlanta United FC	Transfer		August 21, 2019	
18	FW	24	(United States) Diego Lopez	(United States) Orange County SC	Mutual Consent		September 20, 2019	

=== Academy Leaves ===
No.	Pos.	Age	Player	College/Club	Date
34	DF	25	(United States) Kendall Edwards	NC State	August 10, 2019
36	MF	24	(United States) Will Vint	(United States) Colorado Rapids	August 20, 2019

== Competitions ==
=== Friendlies ===
February 23, 2019 Friendly	Chattanooga Red Wolves	1–1	Atlanta United 2	Chattanooga, Tennessee
11:00 AM EST	Mare 11'		Okonkwo 55'	Stadium: David Stanton Field

=== USL Championship ===
==== Standings ====
Pos	Team	Pld	W	D	L	GF	GA	GD	Pts
12	Loudoun United FC	34	11	6	17	59	65	−6	39
13	Charlotte Independence	34	9	11	14	42	53	−11	38
14	Atlanta United 2	34	9	8	17	45	77	−32	35
15	Memphis 901 FC	34	9	7	18	37	52	−15	34
16	Bethlehem Steel FC	34	8	7	19	49	78	−29	31

Source: USL Championship Standings
Rules for classification: 1) total wins; 2) total goal differential; 3) total goals scored; 4) points earned against top four Conference finishers; 5) disciplinary points; 6) coin toss or drawing of lots

==== Results summary ====
Overall								Home						Away					
Pld	W	D	L	GF	GA	GD	Pts	W	D	L	GF	GA	GD	W	D	L	GF	GA	GD
34	9	8	17	45	77	−32	35	8	1	8	28	36	−8	1	7	9	17	41	−24

Last updated: October 20, 2019.
Source: USL

==== Results by matchday ====
Matchday	1	2	3	4	5	6	7	8	9	10	11	12	13	14	15	16	17	18	19	20	21	22	23	24	25	26	27	28	29	30	31	32	33	34
Stadium	H	H	A	H	A	H	H	A	H	A	A	A	H	H	A	A	A	A	H	A	H	A	H	A	H	H	H	A	H	H	A	A	H	A
Result	W	L	D	L	W	W	L	L	L	D	D	D	L	L	L	L	L	L	D	L	W	L	W	L	L	L	W	D	W	W	D	D	W	L
Position	4	8	6	12	8	6	9	12	13	11	11	11	10	12	12	13	17	18	18	18	16	16	15	15	16	16	16	16	15	14	13	13	12	14

Updated to match(es) played on October 20, 2019. Source: USL
A = Away; H = Home; W = Win; D = Draw; L = Loss

==== Matches ====
Win Draw Loss Upcoming

March 9, 2019 USLC 1	Atlanta United 2	2–0	Hartford Athletic	Kennesaw, Georgia
7:30 PM EST	Gallagher 30'; Vazquez 80'; Conway (yellow card) 90+1'	Report	David (yellow card) 72'	Stadium: Fifth Third Bank Stadium; Attendance: 2,037; Referee: Gustavo Solorio

March 15, 2019 USLC 2	Atlanta United 2	0–1	Louisville City	Kennesaw, Georgia
7:30 PM EST	Metcalf (yellow card) 5'; Asiedu (yellow card) 62'	Report	Thiam 72'	Stadium: Fifth Third Bank Stadium; Attendance: 1,571; Referee: Elton Garcia

March 23, 2019 USLC 3	Charlotte Independence	3–3	Atlanta United 2	Matthews, North Carolina
7:00 PM EST	Gutman (yellow card) 58'; Oduro 75'; George 75'; Herrera 90+3'	Report	Williams 1', 42', 90+4', (yellow card) 58'; Benítez (yellow card) 24'; Wild (yellow card) 72'	Stadium: Sportsplex at Matthews; Attendance: 1,823; Referee: Eric Tattersall

April 6, 2019 USLC 4	Atlanta United 2	0–2	Saint Louis FC	Kennesaw, Georgia
	Williams (yellow card) 40'	Report	Fink 9' (pen.); Cicerone 20'; Hilton (yellow card) 88'	Stadium: Fifth Third Bank Stadium; Attendance: 2,640; Referee: Sergii Demianchuk

April 10, 2019 USLC 5	Memphis 901	0–1	Atlanta United 2	Memphis, Tennessee
8:00 PM EST	Hackworth (yellow card) 44'; Caldwell (yellow card) 70'	Report	Barajas 45'; Vint (yellow card) 64'; Benítez (yellow card) 66'; Castanheira (yellow card) 70'	Stadium: AutoZone Park; Attendance: 7,041; Referee: Alan Kelly

April 13, 2019 USLC 6	Atlanta United 2	2–1	North Carolina FC	Kennesaw, Georgia
7:30 PM EST	Wild 25'; Vint (yellow card) 62'; Conway 67'	Report	Lomis 36'; Smith (yellow card) 43'	Stadium: Fifth Third Bank Stadium; Attendance: 2,007; Referee: Aleksandar Zhelyazkov

April 24, 2019 USLC 7	Atlanta United 2	1–4	Tampa Bay Rowdies	Kennesaw, Georgia
7:30 PM EST	Williams (yellow card) 30'; Fernando 34'; Carleton (yellow card) 63'; Wyke (yellow card) 69'; Campbell (yellow card) 85'	Preview	Oduro (yellow card) 36'; Diakité (yellow card) 39'; Fernandes 45'; Morad (yellow card) 59'; Campbell 67' (o.g.); Tejada 87'; Allen 90'	Stadium: Fifth Third Bank Stadium; Attendance: 1,537; Referee: Lukasz Szpala

April 28, 2019 USLC 8	Ottawa Fury	2–0	Atlanta United 2	Ottawa, Ontario
2:00 PM EST	François 40'; Meilleur-Giguère 67'	Report		Stadium: TD Place Stadium; Attendance: 3,691; Referee: Pierre-Luc Lauziere

May 4, 2019 USLC 9	Atlanta United 2	0–2	Nashville SC	Kennesaw, Georgia
7:30 PM	Vint (yellow card) 18'; Conway (yellow card) 20'; Campbell (red card) 76'; Wyke (yellow card) 90+4'	Report	Vint 4' (o.g.); LaGrassa 11'; Ríos (yellow card) 59'; Bourgeois (yellow card) 67'; Akinyode (yellow card) 90+2'	Stadium: Fifth Third Bank Stadium; Attendance: 3,109; Referee: Gabriele Giusti

May 12, 2019 USLC 10	Bethlehem Steel FC	1–1	Atlanta United 2	Chester, Pennsylvania
6:00 PM	Chambers (yellow card) 20'; Topey 64'; Cortés (yellow card) 83'	Report	Wyke 11', (yellow card) 90'; Asiedu (yellow card) 59'; Hernández (yellow card) 72'; Vint (yellow card) 81'	Stadium: Talen Energy Stadium; Attendance: 222; Referee: Lorant Varga

May 19, 2019 USLC 11	Swope Park Rangers	1–1	Atlanta United 2	Kansas City, Kansas
5:00 PM	Hernandez 2'; Andrade (yellow card) 43'; Riley (yellow card) 73'; Karani (yellow card) 86'	Report	Campbell (yellow card) 23'; Wyke (yellow card) 29', (goal) 68'; Conway (yellow card) 90+1'; Hernández (yellow card) 90+6'	Stadium: Children's Mercy Park; Attendance: 419; Referee: Michael Radchuk

May 25, 2019 USLC 12	Charleston Battery	1–1	Atlanta United 2	Charleston, South Carolina
7:30 PM EST	Lewis 79'; Marini (yellow card) 82'	Report	Kissiedou (yellow card) 59', (goal) 71'; Campbell (yellow card) 67'; Wyke (yellow card) 90'	Stadium: MUSC Health Stadium; Attendance: 2,854; Referee: Matthew Thompson

June 7, 2019 USLC 13	Atlanta United 2	1–3	New York Red Bulls II	Kennesaw, Georgia
7:30 PM	Metcalf (yellow card) 5'; Decas (yellow card) 42'; Vazquez 66'; Gallagher (yellow card) 83'; Carleton (yellow card) 84'	Report	Koffi (yellow card) 12'; Rito 44'; Elney 47'; Zajec 76'	Stadium: Fifth Third Bank Stadium; Attendance: 1,662; Referee: Alejandro Mariscal

June 15, 2019 USLC 14	Atlanta United 2	0–5	Pittsburgh Riverhounds	Kennesaw, Georgia
7:30 PM	Barajas (yellow card) 15'; Ambrose (yellow card) 77'	Report	Mertz 4'; Dos Santos 7'; Brett 13'; Vancaeyezeele 70'; Wyke 76' (o.g.)	Stadium: Fifth Third Bank Stadium; Attendance: 2,305; Referee: Daniel Gutierrez

June 22, 2019 USLC 15	Indy Eleven	1–0	Atlanta United 2	Indianapolis, Indiana
7:30 PM	Do-heon (yellow card) 18'; Gibson (yellow card) 68'; Diakhate 84'; Pasher (yellow card) 90+3'	Report	Benítez (yellow card) 12'; Hernández (yellow card) 33'; Wyke (yellow card) 54'; Kissiedou (yellow card) 68'; Decas (yellow card) 74'	Stadium: Lucas Oil Stadium; Attendance: 11,137; Referee: Elijio Arreguin

June 28, 2019 USLC 16	Loudoun United	2–1	Atlanta United 2	Leesburg, Virginia
7:30 PM	Martinez (yellow card) 32'; Sorto 63', 79'	Report	Decas (yellow card) 6'; Conway (yellow card) 41'; Kissiedou (yellow card) 53'; Hernández (yellow card) 64'; Vint (yellow card) 76'; Benítez 86'	Stadium: Loudoun United Stadium; Attendance: 550; Referee: Calin Radosav

July 5, 2019 USLC	Atlanta United 2	P–P	Charleston Battery	Kennesaw, Georgia
7:30 PM				Stadium: Fifth Third Bank Stadium; Referee: Elijio Arreguin
Note: Match postponed due to inclement weather

July 13, 2019 USLC 17	New York Red Bulls II	8–1	Atlanta United 2	Montclair, New Jersey
5:00 PM	Lema 19', 50', 63', 85'; Stroud 21', 39'; Nealis 22'; Buckmaster (yellow card) 27'; Epps 55' (pen.)	Report	Fernando (yellow card) 48' (yellow-red card) 70'; Wyke (yellow card) 58'; Conway 65'; Barajas (yellow card) 84'	Stadium: MSU Soccer Park at Pittser Field; Attendance: 802; Referee: Jon Freemon

July 20, 2019 USLC 18	Birmingham Legion	4–0	Atlanta United 2	Birmingham, Alabama
7:30 PM	Wright 5'; Laurent 39'; Johnson 89'; Kasim 90+5' (pen.)	Report		Stadium: BBVA Compass Field; Referee: Elton García

July 24, 2019 USLC 19	Atlanta United 2	2–2	Charlotte Independence	Kennesaw, Georgia
7:30 PM	Conway (yellow card) 24'; Kanakimana 33', 43'; Campbell (yellow card) 57'; Metcalf (yellow card) 74', (red card) 90+4'; Hernández (yellow card) 89'; Wyke (yellow card) 90+5'	Report	Herrera 27'; Maund 72'; Jones (yellow card) 80'; Jackson (yellow card) 90+5'	Stadium: Fifth Third Bank Stadium; Attendance: 1,015; Referee: Marco Vega

July 27, 2019 USLC 20	North Carolina FC	4–2	Atlanta United 2	Cary, North Carolina
7:30 PM	Ewolo 7', 45'; Miller 15', 19'	Report	Vint 34'; Kanakimana 41'; Carleton (yellow card) 66'	Stadium: WakeMed Soccer Park; Attendance: 4,175; Referee: Gustavo Solorio

August 2, 2019 USLC 21	Atlanta United 2	4–2	Loudoun United	Kennesaw, Georgia
7:30 PM	Wyke (yellow card) 11'; Kanakimana 19', 28', 70'; Vint (yellow card) 46'; Carleton (yellow card) 51'; Hernández (yellow card) 62'; Conway 87'	Report	Wild 14'; Decas 24' (o.g.); Verfurth (yellow card) 32'; Murphy (yellow card) 59'	Stadium: Fifth Third Bank Stadium; Attendance: 1,019; Referee: Kevin Broadley

August 10, 2019 USLC 22	Louisville City	5–1	Atlanta United 2	Louisville, Kentucky
3:00 PM	Ownby 16'; McMahon 41'; McCabe 75'; Spencer 83'; Rasmussen 85'	Report	Decas (yellow card) 49'; Hernández (yellow card) 65'; Conway 72'; Metcalf (yellow card) 86'	Stadium: Louisville Slugger Field; Attendance: 9,292; Referee: Matthew Thompson

August 16, 2019 USLC 23	Atlanta United 2	2–1	Swope Park Rangers	Kennesaw, Georgia
7:30 PM	Campbell (yellow card) 34'; Bello (yellow card) 36'; Conway 58'; Davis 74' (o.g.)	Report	Harris 87'; Riley (yellow card) 90+4'	Stadium: Fifth Third Bank Stadium; Attendance: 1,760; Referee: Jonathan Bilinski

August 24, 2019 USLC 24	Hartford Athletic	3–2	Atlanta United 2	Hartford, Connecticut
5:00 PM	Williams 27' (pen.); Wojcik 77', 89', (yellow card) 90'; Barrera (yellow card) 81'	Report	Wyke (yellow card) 50'; Carleton 57', (red card) 85'; Vazquez 59'	Stadium: Dillon Stadium; Attendance: 4,810; Referee: Lorant Varga

August 28, 2019 USLC 25	Atlanta United 2	1–2	Memphis 901	Kennesaw, Georgia
7:00 PM	Metcalf 37' (pen.); Tubbs (yellow card) 71'; Vazquez (yellow card) 81'	Report	Lindley (yellow card) 55'; Najem 79', 83'	Stadium: Fifth Third Bank Stadium; Attendance: 1,231; Referee: Adam Kilpatrick

September 4, 2019 USLC 26	Atlanta United 2	0–5	Birmingham Legion	Kennesaw, Georgia
7:30 PM	Reilly (yellow card) 37'; Okonkwo (yellow card) 84'	Report	Wright 3'; Williams 43'; Johnson 51'; Asiedu (yellow card) 76'; Kasim 81' (pen.); Culbertson 88'	Stadium: Fifth Third Bank Stadium; Referee: John Griggs

September 7, 2019 USLC 27	Atlanta United 2	3–2	Ottawa Fury	Kennesaw, Georgia
7:30 PM	Carleton 1', 72'; Okonkwo 26'; Bashti (yellow card) 70'	Report	Boskovic (yellow card) 23'; Fall 39' (pen.), (yellow card) 89'; Barry 70'	Stadium: Fifth Third Bank Stadium; Attendance: 2,504; Referee: Kevin Broadley

September 14, 2019 USLC 28	Tampa Bay Rowdies	1–1	Atlanta United 2	St. Petersburg, Florida
7:30 PM	Guenzatti 31'; Oduro (yellow card) 68'	Report	Wyke 13'; Conway (yellow card) 35'	Stadium: Al Lang Stadium; Attendance: 4,367; Referee: Elton García

September 18, 2019 USLC 29	Atlanta United 2	3–1	Charleston Battery	Kennesaw, Georgia
	Fernando 10'; Bello (yellow card) 48'; Carleton 49'; Conway (yellow card) 62'; Metcalf 74' (pen.); Decas (yellow card) 90+1'	Report	Rittmeyer 26'; Kelly-Rosales (yellow card) 29'; Anunga (yellow card) 67'	Stadium: Fifth Third Bank Stadium; Attendance: 1,476; Referee: Natalie Simon

September 25, 2019 USLC 30	Atlanta United 2	2–1	Indy Eleven	Kennesaw, Georgia
7:30 PM	Campbell 24', (yellow card) 34'; Carleton (yellow card) 31', (goal) 61'; Wyke (yellow card) 38'; Decas (yellow card) 52'; Kissiedou (yellow card) 90+3'	Report	Hackshaw (yellow card) 9'; Barrett 36'; Gibson (yellow card) 43'; Barrett (red card) 90+5'	Stadium: Fifth Third Bank Stadium; Referee: Alejandro Mariscal

September 28, 2019 USLC 31	Saint Louis FC	1–1	Atlanta United 2	Fenton, Missouri
8:30 PM	Blackwood 67'; Kacher (yellow card) 75'	Report	Bashti 72'; Metcalf (yellow card) 88'	Stadium: World Wide Technology Soccer Park; Attendance: 4,812; Referee: Elijio Arreguin

October 5, 2019 USLC 32	Pittsburgh Riverhounds	1–1	Atlanta United 2	Pittsburgh, Pennsylvania
7:30 PM	Brett 45' (pen.); Dover (yellow card) 62'; Adewole (yellow card) 74'	Report	Campbell (yellow card) 35'; Wyke (yellow card) 59'; Fernando (yellow card) 72'; Metcalf (yellow card) 76'; Kissiedou (yellow card) 81'; Decas 87'	Stadium: Highmark Stadium; Referee: Elvis Osmanovic

October 9, 2019 USLC 33	Atlanta United 2	5–2	Bethlehem Steel FC	Kennesaw, Georgia
	Decas (yellow card) 13'; Campbell (yellow card) 29', (goal) 38'; Ambrose 43'; Castanheira (yellow card) 47'; Okonkwo 57'; Adams (yellow card) 58'; Bello 61' (pen.); Kanakimana 87' (pen.); Fernando (yellow card) 90+2'	Report	Ofeimu (yellow card) 36'; Moumbagna 48' (pen.); Miscic 77'; Morton (yellow card) 87'; Turner (yellow card) 89'	Stadium: Fifth Third Bank Stadium; Attendance: 1,702; Referee: Malik Badawi

October 19, 2019 USLC 34	Nashville SC	3–0	Atlanta United 2	Nashville, Tennessee
8:30 PM	Lasso 23'; Ríos 32', 39'; Davis (yellow card) 67'	Report	Kissiedou (yellow card) 41'	Stadium: First Tennessee Park; Attendance: 6,773; Referee: Alejandro Mariscal

== Statistics ==
=== Top scorers ===
As of October 20, 2019

Place	Position	Name	USLC	Playoffs	Total
1	MF	(Burundi) Bienvenue Kanakimana	7	0	7
2	MF	(United States) Andrew Carleton	5	0	5
2	FW	(United States) Jackson Conway	5	0	5
4	FW	(United States) Brandon Vazquez	3	0	3
4	FW	(Jamaica) Romario Williams	3	0	3
4	DF	(England) Laurence Wyke	3	0	3
7	DF	(United States) George Campbell	2	0	2
7	FW	(Brazil) Luiz Fernando	2	0	2
7	MF	(England) Jack Metcalf	2	0	2
7	FW	(Nigeria) Patrick Okonkwo	2	0	2
9	DF	(United States) Mikey Ambrose	1	0	1
9	MF	(United States) Kevin Barajas	1	0	1
9	FW	(United States) Amir Bashti	1	0	1
9	DF	(United States) George Bello	1	0	1
9	DF	(Panama) Guillermo Benítez	1	0	1
9	DF	(Honduras) Wesly Decas	1	0	1
9	FW	(Republic of Ireland) Jon Gallagher	1	0	1
9	MF	(Ivory Coast) Laurent Kissiedou	1	0	1
9	MF	(United States) Will Vint	1	0	1
9	FW	(Germany) Gordon Wild	1	0	1
Own Goals			1	0	1
Total			45	0	45

=== Appearances and goals ===
As of October 20, 2019

Numbers after plus-sign(+) denote appearances as a substitute.

No.	Pos	Nat	Player	Total		Regular season		Playoffs	
No.	Pos	Nat	Player	Apps	Goals	Apps	Goals	Apps	Goals
1	GK	(United States) USA	Paul Christensen	0	0	0	0	0	0
2	DF	(United States) USA	Tyler Ruthven	9	0	8+1	0	0	0
3	DF	(Panama) PAN	Guillermo Benítez	21	1	10+11	1	0	0
4	DF	(England) ENG	Jack Metcalf	31	2	31	2	0	0
5	DF	(Honduras) HON	Wesly Decas	24	1	23+1	1	0	0
6	DF	(England) ENG	Laurence Wyke	29	3	26+3	3	0	0
7	FW	(Brazil) BRA	Luiz Fernando	32	2	27+5	2	0	0
8	MF	(United States) USA	Kevin Barajas	13	1	8+5	1	0	0
11	MF	(Ivory Coast) CIV	Laurent Kissiedou	21	1	11+10	1	0	0
12	MF	(England) ENG	Mo Adams	4	0	4	0	0	0
13	GK	(United States) USA	Brendan Moore	9	0	9	0	0	0
14	FW	(United States) USA	Jackson Conway	22	5	17+5	5	0	0
15	DF	(Venezuela) VEN	José Hernández	17	0	16+1	0	0	0
16	MF	(Honduras) HON	Alessandro Castro	6	0	4+2	0	0	0
19	FW	(United States) USA	Brandon Vazquez	6	3	4+2	3	0	0
20	DF	(Guinea) GUI	Florentin Pogba	4	0	4	0	0	0
21	DF	(United States) USA	George Bello	12	1	11+1	1	0	0
22	DF	(United States) USA	Mikey Ambrose	12	1	11+1	1	0	0
24	GK	(United States) USA	Dylan Castanheira	21	0	21	0	0	0
25	GK	(United States) USA	Alec Kann	4	0	4	0	0	0
27	MF	(United States) USA	Chris Goslin	2	0	1+1	0	0	0
28	MF	(England) ENG	Dion Pereira	5	0	4+1	0	0	0
29	MF	(Burundi) BDI	Bienvenue Kanakimana	16	7	8+8	7	0	0
30	MF	(United States) USA	Andrew Carleton	15	5	14+1	5	0	0
31	MF	(United States) USA	Amir Bashti	9	1	7+2	1	0	0
32	MF	(Germany) GER	Kevin Kratz	8	0	7+1	0	0	0
34	DF	(United States) USA	Kendall Edwards	2	0	2	0	0	0
35	FW	(Nigeria) NGA	Patrick Okonkwo	16	2	10+6	2	0	0
36	MF	(United States) USA	Will Vint	16	1	9+7	1	0	0
37	DF	(United States) USA	George Campbell	22	2	20+2	2	0	0
38	DF	(Argentina) ARG	Franco Escobar	1	0	1	0	0	0
39	MF	(United States) USA	Will Reilly	10	0	5+5	0	0	0
40	DF	(United States) USA	Brandon Clagette	4	0	4	0	0	0
41	DF	(United States) USA	Jordan Matthews	2	0	1+1	0	0	0
42	DF	(United States) USA	Garrison Tubbs	6	0	4+2	0	0	0
Players who have played for Atlanta United 2 this season but have left the club:
9	FW	(Jamaica) JAM	Romario Williams	5	3	5	3	0	0
10	MF	(United States) USA	Yosef Samuel	8	0	2+6	0	0	0
23	MF	(United States) USA	Lagos Kunga	2	0	0+2	0	0	0
26	FW	(Ireland) EIR	Jon Gallagher	8	1	8	1	0	0
31	MF	(Ghana) GHA	Anderson Asiedu	10	0	8+2	0	0	0
33	FW	(Germany) GER	Gordon Wild	8	1	6+2	1	0	0
