= 2019 Charlotte Independence season =

Charlotte Independence
2019 season
- President: Jim McPhilliamy
- Head coach: Jim McGuinness (until June 12); Mike Jeffries
- Stadium: Sportsplex at Matthews
- USL: Conference: 13th
- USL Playoffs: Did not qualify
- U.S. Open Cup: Second round
- Highest home attendance: League/All: 3,544 (June 15 vs. Birmingham)
- Lowest home attendance: League: 1,217 (July 7 vs. Pittsburgh); All: 500 (July 7 vs. Florida Soccer Soldiers, USOC R2)
- Average home league attendance: 1,750
- Biggest win: 4–0 (September 28 vs. Hartford)
- Biggest defeat: 0–3 (April 20 vs. NCFC) (Sep 21 vs. Swope Park); 1–4 (June 2 vs. Ottawa)
Home colors	Away colors

The 2019 Charlotte Independence season was the club's fifth season of existence, and their fifth in the USL Championship, the second tier of American soccer.

== Club ==
=== Roster ===
As of June 20, 2019

No.	Position	Nation	Player
2	DF	USA	Brendan McDonough (on loan from Vancouver Whitecaps FC)
3	DF	USA	Hugh Roberts
4	MF	USA	Jake Areman
5	DF	FRA	Steven Thicot
7	FW	GHA	Dominic Oduro
8	MF	USA	Isaac Angking (on loan from New England Revolution)
9	FW	USA	Niki Jackson (on loan from Colorado Rapids)
10	FW	COL	Jorge Herrera
11	FW	ARG	Valentin Sabella
13	MF	TTO	Kevan George
15	MF	MEX	Ricardo Bocanegra
16	FW	CGO	Cabwey Kivutuka
17	DF	USA	Clay Dimick
18	DF	USA	Aaron Maund
19	MF	URU	Enzo Martínez
21	FW	USA	Zyen Jones
22	DF	LBR	Joel Johnson
23	MF	URU	Alex Martínez
26	MF	ALB	Afrim Taku
29	DF	GAM	Abdoulie Mansally
31	MF	USA	Henry Cordova
32	MF	USA	Ryan Baer
33	GK	USA	Brandon Miller
47	DF	CMR	Hassan Ndam (on loan from FC Cincinnati)
50	GK	USA	Lucas Hatsios
66	GK	USA	Joshua Old
—	GK	USA	Brandon Barnes (on loan from Forward Madison)

USL Academy Contract

== Competitions ==
=== Friendlies ===
All times in regular season on Eastern Daylight Time (UTC-04:00)

Win Draw Loss Upcoming fixture

February 16 Preseason	Charlotte Independence	–	Duke Blue Devils	Matthews, North Carolina
EST (UTC–5)				Stadium: Sportsplex at Matthews
Note: Score not publicized.

February 20 Preseason	Charlotte Independence	2–1	Lenoir-Rhyne Bears	Matthews, North Carolina
EST (UTC–5)	A. Martínez	Report	Morillas (?)	Stadium: Sportsplex at Matthews

February 23 Preseason	North Carolina FC	0–1	Charlotte Independence	Raleigh, North Carolina
		Report	E. Martínez	Stadium: Cardinal Gibbons High School

February 27 Preseason	Charlotte 49ers	0–0	Charlotte Independence	Charlotte, North Carolina
		Report		Stadium: Transamerica Field

March 2 Preseason	Atlanta United FC	–	Charlotte Independence	Marietta, Georgia
				Stadium: Children's Healthcare of Atlanta Training Ground
Note: Match result not publicized.

=== USL Championship ===
==== Standings ====
Pos	Team	Pld	W	D	L	GF	GA	GD	Pts
11	Saint Louis FC	34	11	9	14	40	41	−1	42
12	Loudoun United FC	34	11	6	17	59	65	−6	39
13	Charlotte Independence	34	9	11	14	42	53	−11	38
14	Atlanta United 2	34	9	8	17	45	77	−32	35
15	Memphis 901 FC	34	9	7	18	37	52	−15	34

Source: USL Championship Standings
Rules for classification: 1) total wins; 2) total goal differential; 3) total goals scored; 4) points earned against top four Conference finishers; 5) disciplinary points; 6) coin toss or drawing of lots

==== Results summary ====
Overall								Home						Away					
Pld	W	D	L	GF	GA	GD	Pts	W	D	L	GF	GA	GD	W	D	L	GF	GA	GD
19	4	8	7	21	28	−7	20	4	1	4	15	16	−1	0	7	3	6	12	−6

Last updated: July 7, 2019.
Source: Matches

Round	1	2	3	4	5	6	7	8	9	10	11	12	13	14	15	16	17	18	19	20	21	22	23	24	25	26	27	28	29	30	31	32	33	34
Stadium	H	H	A	A	H	H	H	A	A	H	A	A	A	A	H	A	H	A	H	H	A	A	H	A	H	A	H	H	A	H	H	A	A	H
Result	L	D	L	L	L	W	L	D	D	L	D	D	L	D	W	D	W	D	W	W	D	L	L	D	L	L	D	L	L	L	W	W	W	W

Updated to match(es) played on September 28, 2019. Source: Matches
A = Away; H = Home; W = Win; D = Draw; L = Loss; P = Postponed

==== Matches ====
The 2019 USL Championship season schedule for the club was announced on December 19, 2018.

All times in regular season on Eastern Daylight Time (UTC-04:00)

Win Draw Loss Upcoming fixture

March 15 1	Charlotte Independence	2–3	Indy Eleven	Matthews, North Carolina
6:00 PM	Taku (yellow card) 26'; A. Martínez (yellow card) 56'; Oduro 73'; Gutman 83'	Report	King 12'; Gibson 15'; Enevoldsen 69'	Stadium: Sportsplex at Matthews; Attendance: 1,649; Referee: Gustavo Solorio

March 23 2	Charlotte Independence	3–3	Atlanta United 2	Matthews, North Carolina
6:00 PM	Gutman (yellow card) 58'; Oduro 75'; George 85'; Herrera 90+3'	Report	Williams 1', 42', (yellow card) 58', (goal) 90+4'; Benítez (yellow card) 24'; Wild (yellow card) 72'	Stadium: Sportsplex at Matthews; Attendance: 1,823; Referee: Eric Tattersall

March 30 3	Saint Louis FC	1–0	Charlotte Independence	Fenton, Missouri
1:00 PM	Greig 5'	Report	Taku (yellow card) 44'; Johnson (yellow card) 63'; Herrera (yellow card) 82'	Stadium: Toyota Stadium; Attendance: 3,778; Referee: Lorant Varga

April 7 4 Southern Derby	Charleston Battery	2–0	Charlotte Independence	Charleston, South Carolina
1:00 PM EDT	Svantesson 21'; Lewis 71'	Report	E. Martínez (yellow card) 18'; Hill (yellow card) 27'	Stadium: MUSC Health Stadium; Attendance: 2,210; Referee: Matt Franz

April 13 5	Charlotte Independence	1–2	New York Red Bulls II	Matthews, North Carolina
6:00 PM EDT	Jackson 25'; George (yellow card) 51'; Hill (yellow card) 53'	Report	Barlow 33', 36'; McSherry (yellow card) 79'; Amarildo (yellow card) 85'	Stadium: Sportsplex at Matthews; Attendance: 1,562; Referee: Guido Gonzales, Jr.

April 16 6	Charlotte Independence	2–1	Bethlehem Steel FC	Matthews, North Carolina
6:00 PM	Gutman 29', (yellow card) 66'; Herrera 72'	Report	Turner (yellow card) 57'; Willis 80'; Real (yellow card) 84'; Ofeimu (yellow card) 85'	Stadium: Matthews Sportsplex; Attendance: 1,387; Referee: Elvis Osmanovic

April 20 7 Southern Derby	Charlotte Independence	0–3	North Carolina FC	Matthews, North Carolina
7:00 PM	Maria (yellow card) 67'	Report	Comsia (yellow card) 45+1' da Luz 45+2'; Lomis 73'; Speas 85'	Stadium: Sportsplex at Matthews; Attendance: 1,569; Referee: Ismir Pekmic

April 27 8	Tampa Bay Rowdies	1–1	Charlotte Independence	St. Petersburg, Florida
6:30 PM	Guenzatti 17'; Oduro (yellow card) 30'	Report	Oduro 11'; A. Martínez (yellow card) 25'	Stadium: Al Lang Stadium; Attendance: 5,651; Referee: Daniel Gutierrez

May 4 9	Hartford Athletic	1–1	Charlotte Independence	East Hartford, Connecticut
7:00 PM EDT	Steeves 12'; Martin (yellow card) 79'	Report	Mansally 3'; Maria (yellow card) 39'; Jones (yellow card) 90+1'	Stadium: Rentschler Field; Attendance: 11,346; Referee: David Barrie

May 11 10	Charlotte Independence	1–3	Loudoun United FC	Matthews, North Carolina
7:00 PM	Oduro 30'	Report	S. Bustamante (yellow card) 24'; Presley 43'; Pilato 46'; Kadono 58'	Stadium: Sportsplex at Matthews; Attendance: 1,466; Referee: John Griggs

May 18 11	Nashville SC	1–1	Charlotte Independence	Nashville, Tennessee
7:00 PM	Moloto 23'; Davis (yellow card) 78'	Report	Oduro 15'; Jackson (yellow card) 90'	Stadium: First Tennessee Park; Attendance: 6,918; Referee: Gustavo Solorio

May 25 12	Pittsburgh Riverhounds SC	0–0	Charlotte Independence	Pittsburgh, Pennsylvania
7:00 PM EDT	Greenspan (yellow card) 28' (yellow-red card) 36'	Report	Johnson (yellow card) 47'; Jackson (yellow card) 90+1'	Stadium: Highmark Stadium; Attendance: 2,522; Referee: Alejandro Mariscal

June 2 13	Ottawa Fury FC	4–1	Charlotte Independence	Ottawa, Ontario
2:00 PM EDT (UTC–5)	Attakora (yellow card) 18'; Mannella (yellow card) 30'; Fall 36' (yellow card) 90+4'; Samb 37' 56'; Obasi (yellow card) 64'; François 89'	Report	Roberts 14' (red card) 80'; Jones (yellow card) 51'; Johnson (red card) 60'; Areman (yellow card) 90+4'	Stadium: TD Place Stadium; Attendance: 3,589; Referee: Matt Souare

June 8 14	Swope Park Rangers	0–0	Charlotte Independence	Kansas City, Kansas
5:00 PM EDT (UTC–5)	Segbers (yellow card) 80'	Report	Gutman (yellow card) 34'; Taku (yellow card) 36'	Stadium: Children's Mercy Park; Attendance: 592; Referee: Ismir Pekmic

June 15 15	Charlotte Independence	4–1	Birmingham Legion	Matthews, North Carolina
7:00 PM EDT	Gutman 7'; E. Martínez 48'; Herrera 60' (pen.), (yellow card) 70'; Mansally 65'	Report	Avila (yellow card) 12'; Kasim 26'; Culbertson (yellow card) 28'; Laurent (yellow card) 59'	Stadium: Sportsplex at Matthews; Attendance: 3,544; Referee: Gabriele Giusti

June 22 16	Louisville City FC	1–1	Charlotte Independence	Louisville, Kentucky
7:00 PM EDT	Rasmussen (yellow card) 71'; Spencer 77'; Matsoso (yellow card) 87'; Jane (yellow card) 90+1'	Report	Oduro 12'; Mansally (yellow card) 58'; Taku (yellow card) 90+2'	Stadium: Louisville Slugger Field; Attendance: 9,379; Referee: Elton Garcia

June 29 17	Charlotte Independence	1–0	Memphis 901 FC	Matthews, North Carolina
6:00 PM	A. Martinez (yellow card) 67'; Herrera 74'	Report	Charpie (yellow card) 70'	Stadium: Sportsplex at Matthews; Attendance: 1,623; Referee: Elvis Osmanovic

July 4 18 Southern Derby	North Carolina FC	1–1	Charlotte Independence	Cary, North Carolina
7:00 PM EDT	Chester 3'; Miller (yellow card) 75'	Report	Jackson 14'; George (yellow card) 76'	Stadium: Sahlen's Stadium at WakeMed Soccer Park; Attendance: 4,456; Referee: Matthew Franz

July 7 19	Charlotte Independence	1–0	Pittsburgh Riverhounds SC	Matthews, North Carolina
7:00 PM EDT	A. Martinez 23'	Report	Adewole (yellow card) 68'; Kerr (yellow card) 90+4'	Stadium: Sportsplex at Matthews; Attendance: 1,217; Referee: Sergii Demianchuk

July 13 20	Charlotte Independence	2–1	Saint Louis FC	Matthews, North Carolina
7:00 PM EDT	Jackson 5'; Mansally (yellow card) 36'; E> Martínez 49'; Johnson (red card) 80'	Report	Dacres (yellow card) 51'; Hilton (yellow card) 68'; Calvert 75'	Stadium: Sportsplex at Matthews; Attendance: 2,007; Referee: Kevin Broadley

July 24 21	Atlanta United 2	2–2	Charlotte Independence	Kennesaw, Georgia
7:30 PM	Conway (yellow card) 24'; Kanakimana 33', 43'; Campbell (yellow card) 57'; Metcalf (yellow card) 74' (yellow-red card) 90+4'; Hernández (yellow card) 89'; Wyke (yellow card) 90+5'	Report	Herrera 27'; Maund 72'; Jones (yellow card) 80'; Jackson (yellow card) 90+5'	Stadium: Fifth Third Bank Stadium; Referee: Marco Vega

July 27 22	Birmingham Legion FC	1–0	Charlotte Independence	Birmingham, Alabama
8:00 PM	Williams 28'; Asiedu (yellow card) 45+1'; Lopez (yellow card) 90'; Opoku (yellow card) 90+2'	Report	George (yellow card) 90+1'	Stadium: BBVA Field; Attendance: 4,433; Referee: Lorant Varga

August 3 23	Charlotte Independence	0–1	Louisville City FC	Matthews, North Carolina
7:00 PM EDT	A. Martínez (yellow card) 72' (yellow-red card) 72'; Johnson (yellow card) 90+4'	Report	Craig (yellow card) 29' (yellow-red card) 60'; McMahon (yellow card) 47'; Spencer 80'	Stadium: Sportsplex at Matthews; Attendance: 1,835; Referee: Malik Badawi

August 9 24	Loudoun United FC	3–3	Charlotte Independence	Leesburg, Virginia
7:30 PM EDT	Nyeman (yellow card) 31'; Hawkins 45+4'; A. Bustamante 65'; Alvarez 79'	Report	Sabella 38'; Johnson (yellow card) 48'; Maund (yellow card) 51'; Herrera 63'; Oduro 70'	Stadium: Segra Field; Referee: Luis Guardia

August 17 25	Charlotte Independence	1–3	Nashville SC	Matthews, North Carolina
7:00 PM	Sabella (yellow card) 18'; E. Martínez 23', (yellow card) 55'; Johnson (yellow card) 51'; Taku (yellow card) 86'	Report	Ríos 7', 56' (pen.); Ockford (yellow card) 45+2'; Belmar 60'	Stadium: Sportsplex at Matthews; Attendance: 1,518; Referee: Chris Ruska

August 25 26	Indy Eleven	3–1	Charlotte Independence	Indianapolis, Indiana
6:00 PM EDT	Ouimette 41'; Conner 53', 83'	Report	E. Martínez (yellow card) 8'; Jackson 15'; Oduro (yellow card) 41'; Maund (yellow card) 70'	Stadium: Lucas Oil Stadium; Attendance: 10,089; Referee: Matthew Thompson

August 30 27	Charlotte Independence	0–0	Charleston Battery	Matthews, North Carolina
6:00 PM	Mansally (yellow card) 30'; Sabella (yellow card) 55'; George (yellow card) 82'	Report	Lewis (yellow card) 11'; Anunga (yellow card) 47'; Mueller (yellow card) 67'; Bolt (yellow card) 90'	Stadium: Sportsplex at Matthews; Attendance: 1,477; Referee: Elton García

September 7 28	Charlotte Independence	1–3	Tampa Bay Rowdies	Matthews, North Carolina
19:00 EST (UTC−5)	Thicot (yellow card) 71'; Roberts 83'	Report	Tejada 7', 49'; Siaj 74'	Stadium: Sportsplex at Matthews; Attendance: 1,930; Referee: Greg Dopka

September 13 29	New York Red Bulls II	2–0	Charlotte Independence	Montclair, New Jersey
7:00 PM EDT	Jørgenson 15'; Nealis (yellow card) 47'; Scarlett (yellow card) 59'; Stroud 83'	Report	E. Martínez (yellow card) 25'; Sabella (yellow card) 37'; Roberts (yellow card) 59'; Bocanegra (yellow card) 63'; A. Martínez (yellow card) 66'	Stadium: MSU Soccer Park; Attendance: 1,522; Referee: Lukasz Szpala

September 21 30	Charlotte Independence	0–3	Swope Park Rangers	Matthews, North Carolina
7:00 PM	A. Martínez (yellow card) 71'	Report	Jaylin (yellow card) 1'; Harris 29', 57'; Allach (yellow card) 73'; Kuzain 87'	Stadium: Sportsplex at Matthews; Attendance: 1,267; Referee: Danielle Chesky

September 28 31	Charlotte Independence	4–0	Hartford Athletic	Matthews, North Carolina
7:00 PM EDT	Bocanegra (yellow card) 26', (goal) 75'; George (yellow card) 55'; A. Martínez 60'; Mansally (yellow card) 64'; E. Martínez 74' (pen.), 90+3'	Report	Barrera (yellow card) 59'	Stadium: Sportsplex at Matthews; Attendance: 2,319; Referee: Tori Penso

October 6 32	Bethlehem Steel FC	1–2	Charlotte Independence	Bethlehem, Pennsylvania
7:30 PM	Moumbagna 14'; Chambers (yellow card) 31'; Picazo (yellow card) 69'; Kingue (yellow card) 82'	Report	Maund 6'; Roberts (yellow card) 12', (goal) 67'; A. Martínez (red card) 31'; Mansally (yellow card) 72'	Stadium: Talen Energy Stadium; Attendance: 351; Referee: Matthew Franz

October 12 33	Memphis 901 FC	1–2	Charlotte Independence	Memphis, Tennessee
8:00 PM	Grandison (yellow card) 59'; Allen 73' (pen.), (red card) 75'; Doyle (yellow card) 79' da Silva (yellow card) 88' (yellow-red card) 90+6'; Burch (yellow card) 90+4'	Report	Herrera 39'; Jackson (yellow card) 62', (goal) 77'; Roberts (yellow card) 75'; Miller (yellow card) 75'	Stadium: AutoZone Park; Attendance: 5,780; Referee: John Griggs

October 19 34	Charlotte Independence	3–1	Ottawa Fury FC	Matthews, North Carolina
19:00 EST (UTC–5)	Oduro 12'; Martínez (yellow card) 50', (goal) 89', 90+4'	Report	Attakora (yellow card) 27'; Barry 60'; Barnathan (yellow card) 81' (yellow-red card) 83'	Stadium: Sportsplex at Matthews; Attendance: 1,552; Referee: Thomas Snyder

=== U.S. Open Cup ===
As a member of the USL Championship, the Independence entered the tournament in the Second Round, played May 14–15, 2019

May 14 2nd Round	Charlotte Independence (North Carolina)	2–2 (a.e.t.) (4–5 p)	Florida Soccer Soldiers	Matthews, North Carolina
7:00 PM	Roberts (yellow card) 9', (goal) 31'; Johnson (yellow card) 34'; Maund (yellow card) 53'; Maria (yellow card) 68'; Oduro 92'	Report	Hoyos (yellow card) 24'; Sabella (yellow card) 27', (goal) 119'; González (yellow card) 33' (yellow-red card) 90+2'; Williams 78'; Ruiz De Somocurcio (yellow card) 97'; Guanipa (yellow card) 117'	Stadium: Sportsplex at Matthews; Attendance: 500; Referee: Kevin Broadley
	Penalties
	Herrera (penalty scored); Taku (penalty scored); Gutman (penalty scored); Oduro (penalty scored); E. Martínez (penalty missed)		(penalty scored) Gammiero; (penalty scored) Serrano; (penalty scored) Williams; (penalty scored) Meneses; (penalty scored) Sabella
