= 2019 Loudoun United FC season =

Loudoun United FC
2019 season
- Head coach: Richie Williams (from May 30); Ryan Martin (May 30–onwards)
- Stadium: Segra Field
- USL Championship: 12th, Eastern Conference
- USL Playoffs: Did not qualify
- Top goalscorer: Kyle Murphy (13)
- Highest home attendance: 5,015 (August 9 vs. Charlotte)
- Lowest home attendance: 550 (June 28 vs. Atlanta United 2)
- Average home league attendance: 1,381 (688 - Audi Field) (1,670 - Segra Field)
- Biggest win: 4–0 (August 31 vs. North Carolina); 7–3 (October 19 vs. NYRB2)
- Biggest defeat: 1–5 (September 7 at Hartford)

The 2019 Loudoun United FC season was Loudoun United FC's first season of existence, their first in the second-division of American soccer, and their 1st in the USL Championship. It is the first season since 2011 that D.C. United fielded a reserve team.

== Background ==
On July 18, 2018, the club was announced by USL and D.C. United as were the team's name, colors and crest. Loudoun United replaced Richmond Kickers as D.C.'s USL affiliate.

== Review ==
=== Early season ===
On March 9, 2019, Loudoun United played their first USL Championship game, losing 0–2 against Nashville SC. The next week, Loudoun had their first goal in club history, when Griffin Yow scored in the 30th minute against Memphis 901 FC in a game that ended in a 1–1 draw. On April 3, it was announced that Loudoun would play in Audi Field for three "home away from home" games. Loudoun United won their first game in history when they beat New York Red Bulls II 3–1 on April 20, 2019. On May 3, Loudoun played their first "home away from home" game at Audi Field against Bethlehem Steel. The game ended in a 3–3 draw. On May 30, the current Head Coach, Richie Williams was hired by MLS side, New England Revolution for the role of assistant coach. Williams was then replaced by former academy director, Ryan Martin.

=== Midseason ===
On August 9, Loudoun played their first game in their newly constructed Segra Field against Charlotte Independence. The game ended in a 3–3 draw in front of 5,015 spectators. Loudoun won their first game at Segra Field on August 31, in a 4–0 against North Carolina FC.

=== Late season ===
Loudoun won all of their 4 last regular season games. In their final regular season game, they played against the New York Red Bulls II at home, and won 7–3 in front of a crowd of 3,014 people. They finished their inaugural season in 12th place in the eastern conference and were just 4 points behind the playoffs line.

== Club ==
=== Roster ===
Note: Flags indicate national team as defined under FIFA eligibility rules; some limited exceptions apply. Players may hold more than one non-FIFA nationality. Squad correct as of March 8, 2019.

No.	Pos.	Nation	Player
1	GK	USA	Calle Brown
2	DF	USA	Hunter Gorskie
3	DF	USA	Peabo Doue
4	DF	USA	Donovan Pines
5	MF	USA	Noah Pilato
6	FW	GER	Gordon Wild
7	MF	USA	Carlos Alvarez
8	FW	GHA	Elvis Amoh
9	FW	USA	Kyle Murphy
10	FW	JPN	Shinya Kadono
11	FW	CRC	Orlando Sinclair
12	MF	USA	Connor Presley
13	DF	SLV	Allexon Saravia
14	MF	USA	Kevin Paredes
15	FW	USA	Griffin Yow
16	FW	USA	Antonio Bustamante
17	MF	USA	Andrew Lubahn
18	GK	USA	Colin Miller
19	GK	USA	Earl Edwards Jr.
20	FW	USA	Christian Sorto
22	DF	ENG	Harri Hawkins
23	MF	USA	Sandor Bustamante
24	MF	USA	Collin Verfurth
25	FW	SEN	Alioune Ndour
27	DF	MEX	Miguel Garduño
28	DF	USA	Robby Dambrot
29	DF	USA	Shane Wiedt
30	MF	USA	Nelson Martinez
31	DF	USA	Chris Odoi-Atsem
33	MF	USA	Jacob Greene
35	MF	USA	Theodore Ku-DiPietro
36	DF	USA	Adam Lundegard
44	MF	USA	Moses Nyeman
53	MF	USA	Jeremy Garay
55	MF	USA	John Murphy
77	GK	USA	Sebastian Conlon
91	FW	USA	Gabriel Segal
99	MF	SLV	Alexis Cerritos

Signed to first team contract with D.C. United.
D.C. United Academy player.

=== Staff ===
Technical staff
Technical director	Stewart Mairs
Head coach	Ryan Martin
Assistant coach	Jason Boxx
Assistant coach	Luciano Emílio
Assistant coach	Jack Stefanowski

== Competitions ==
=== Exhibitions ===
February 21 Preseason	Loudoun United FC	2–1	Bethlehem Steel FC	Leesburg, Virginia
	,		Goal	Stadium: Evergreen Sportsplex
Note: Closed-door scrimmage

February 27 Preseason	Richmond Kickers	2–3	Loudoun United FC	Richmond, Virginia
	Jackson 20'; Trialist 81'	Report	Sinclair 22'; Kadono 67'; Lubahn 75'	Stadium: Ukrop Park

=== USL Championship ===
==== Standings ====
Pos	Team	Pld	W	D	L	GF	GA	GD	Pts	Qualification
10	Birmingham Legion FC	34	12	7	15	35	51	−16	43	Play-In Round
11	Saint Louis FC	34	11	9	14	40	41	−1	42	
12	Loudoun United FC	34	11	6	17	59	65	−6	39	
13	Charlotte Independence	34	9	11	14	42	53	−11	38	
14	Atlanta United 2	34	9	8	17	45	77	−32	35	

Source: USL Championship Standings
Rules for classification: 1) total wins; 2) total goal differential; 3) total goals scored; 4) points earned against top four Conference finishers; 5) disciplinary points; 6) coin toss or drawing of lots

==== Matches ====
On December 19, 2018, the USL announced their 2019 season schedule.
All times are in Eastern time.

March 9 1	Nashville SC	2–0	Loudoun United FC	Nashville, Tennessee
8:00 PM	Lancaster 58'; Ríos 61'; Moloto (yellow card) 87'	Report		Stadium: Nissan Stadium; Attendance: 5,356; Referee: Thomas Snyder

March 16 2	Memphis 901 FC	1–1	Loudoun United FC	Memphis, Tennessee
8:00 PM	Collier (yellow card) 76', (goal) 78'	Report	Pilato (yellow card) 25'; Yow 30'; Murphy (yellow card) 87'	Stadium: AutoZone Park; Attendance: 7,250; Referee: Matt Franz

March 30 3	Tampa Bay Rowdies	0–0	Loudoun United FC	St. Petersburg, Florida
7:30 PM	Oduro (yellow card) 38'	Report	Pilato (yellow card) 16'; Verfurth (yellow card) 61'; Saravia (yellow card) 82'	Stadium: Al Lang Stadium; Attendance: 5,893; Referee: Gabriele Giusti

April 13 4	Ottawa Fury FC	2–0	Loudoun United FC	Ottawa, Ontario
2:00 PM	Samb 34'; Oliveira 52', (yellow card) 72'	Report	S. Bustamante (yellow card) 36'; Verfurth (yellow card) 87'	Stadium: TD Place Stadium; Attendance: 3,232; Referee: David Barrie

April 20 5	New York Red Bulls II	1–3	Loudoun United FC	Montclair, New Jersey
12:00 PM	Jørgenson 4'	Report	Sinclair 14'; Lubahn 22'; Ward (yellow card) 55'; Murphy 78'	Stadium: MSU Soccer Park; Attendance: 621; Referee: Elijio Arreguin

April 27 6	Birmingham Legion	1–0	Loudoun United FC	Birmingham, Alabama
8:00 PM	Johnson (yellow card) 19'; Herivaux (yellow card) 59'; Kasim 90+4', (yellow card) 90+4'	Report		Stadium: BBVA Compass Field; Referee: Sergii Demianchuk

May 3 7	Loudoun United FC	3–3	Bethlehem Steel FC	Washington, D.C.
6:30 PM	Murphy 37', 49'; Verfurth (yellow card) 59'; Sinclair 90+3'	Report	Ngalina 31', 32'; Moumbagna 60' (pen.)	Stadium: Audi Field; Attendance: 824; Referee: Mark Allatin

May 11 8	Charlotte Independence	1–3	Loudoun United FC	Matthews, North Carolina
7:00 PM	Oduro 30'	Report	S. Bustamante (yellow card) 24'; Presley 43'; Pilato 46'; Kadono 58'	Stadium: Sportsplex at Matthews; Attendance: 1,466; Referee: John Griggs

May 19 9	Loudoun United FC	1–2	Hartford Athletic	Washington, D.C.
7:30 PM EDT	Villatoro (yellow card) 31'; Lyngø 64' (o.g.); Campos (yellow card) 88'	Report	Angulo 59', 68'; Gentile (yellow card) 90+2'	Stadium: Audi Field; Attendance: 825; Referee: Eric Tattersall

June 5 10	Swope Park Rangers	2–3	Loudoun United FC	Kansas City, Kansas
7:00 PM	Hernandez 13'; Harris 45+2'	Report	Murphy 6'; Yow 39' (yellow card) 45+1'; Presley 87'	Stadium: Children's Mercy Park; Attendance: 529; Referee: Danielle Chesky

June 8 11	Louisville City FC	2–1	Loudoun United FC	Louisville, Kentucky
7:00 PM EDT	Rasmussen 1'; Totsch 39'; Peay (yellow card) 45'; McCabe (yellow card) 45'	Report	Yow 49'; Nyeman (yellow card) 50'; Hawkins (yellow card) 90+4'	Stadium: Louisville Slugger Field; Referee: Marcos DeOliveira

June 15 12	Loudoun United FC	1–2	Indy Eleven	Washington, D.C.
7:30 PM EDT	Lubahn 12'; Martinez (yellow card) 86'	Report	Martinez 66' (o.g.); Pasher 89'	Stadium: Audi Field; Attendance: 650; Referee: Thomas Snyder

June 28 13	Loudoun United FC	2–1	Atlanta United 2	Washington, D.C.
7:30 PM	Martinez (yellow card) 32'; Sorto 63', 79'	Report	Decas (yellow card) 6'; Conway (yellow card) 41'; Kissiedou (yellow card) 53'; Hernández (yellow card) 64'; Vint (yellow card) 76'; Benítez 86'	Stadium: Audi Field; Attendance: 550; Referee: Calin Radosav

July 6 14	Saint Louis FC	2–2	Loudoun United FC	Fenton, Missouri
7:30 PM	Hilton (yellow card) 55'; Greig 57'; Cicerone 73'; Umar (yellow card) 88'	Report	K. Murphy 41'; Martinez 51', (yellow card) 66'; Ward (yellow card) 82'	Stadium: Toyota Stadium; Attendance: 4,564; Referee: Adam Kilpatrick

July 17 15	North Carolina FC	3–0	Loudoun United FC	Cary, North Carolina
19:00 EDT	Kristo 10'; Wapiwo (yellow card) 65'; Chester 72', 74'	Report		Stadium: Sahlen's Stadium at WakeMed Soccer Park; Attendance: 3,273; Referee: Elvis Osmanovic

July 20 16	Indy Eleven	2–0	Loudoun United FC	Indianapolis, Indiana
7:00 PM EDT	Gibson (yellow card) 24'; Barrett (yellow card) 50'; Ayoze (yellow card) 55'; Osmond (yellow card) 73'; Enevoldsen 81'; Kelly (yellow card) 83'; Pasher 90+1'	Report	Verfurth (yellow card) 5'; Edwards (yellow card) 87'	Stadium: Lucas Oil Stadium; Attendance: 11,059; Referee: Matthew Corrigan

July 28 17	Loudoun United FC	3–0	Louisville City FC	Washington, D.C.
7:30 PM EDT	A. Bustamante 22'; Murphy (yellow card) 68'; Martinez (yellow card) 72'; Amoh 84'; Nyeman 87'	Report	Souahy (red card) 30'; Ownby (yellow card) 90+2'	Stadium: Audi Field; Attendance: 593; Referee: Dejan Susak
Note: Last scheduled match at Audi Field

August 2 18	Atlanta United 2	4–2	Loudoun United FC	Kennesaw, Georgia
7:30 PM EDT	Wyke (yellow card) 11'; Kanakimana 19', 28', 70'; Vint (yellow card) 46'; Carleton (yellow card) 51'; Hernández (yellow card) 62'; Conway 87'	Report	Wild 14'; Decas 24' (o.g.); Verfurth (yellow card) 32'; Murphy (yellow card) 59'	Stadium: Fifth Third Bank Stadium; Attendance: 1,019; Referee: Kevin Broadley

August 9 19	Loudoun United FC	3–3	Charlotte Independence	Leesburg, Virginia
7:30 PM EDT	Nyeman (yellow card) 31'; Hawkins 45+4'; A. Bustamante 65'; Alvarez 79'	Report	Sabella 38'; Johnson (yellow card) 48'; Maund (yellow card) 51'; Herrera 63'; Oduro 70'	Stadium: Segra Field; Attendance: 5,015; Referee: Luis Guardia
Note: First scheduled match at new stadium

August 14 20	Loudoun United FC	1–2	Charleston Battery	Leesburg, Virginia
7:30 PM EDT	Sinclair 78'	Report	Mueller 21' van Schaik (yellow card) 29'; Marini 61'; Woodbine (yellow card) 90+1'	Stadium: Segra Field; Attendance: 1,012; Referee: Calin Radosav

August 17 21	Loudoun United FC	1–3	Ottawa Fury FC	Leesburg, Virginia
7:30 PM EST (UTC–5)	Wild 1'; Amoh (yellow card) 13'; Hawkins (yellow card) 85'; Sinclair (yellow card) 90+2'	Report	Oliviera 23'; François 30'; Haworth 74'	Stadium: Segra Field; Attendance: 1,672; Referee: Lorant Varga

August 23 22	Pittsburgh Riverhounds SC	1–0	Loudoun United FC	Pittsburgh, Pennsylvania
7:00 PM EDT	Dos Santos 5'; Dover (yellow card) 77'	Report	Martinez (yellow card) 53'; Amoh (yellow card) 68'	Stadium: Highmark Stadium; Referee: Chris Ruska

August 28 23	Loudoun United FC	1–1	Birmingham Legion	Leesburg, Virginia
7:30 PM	Murphy 47'; Alvarez (yellow card) 57'; Amoh (yellow card) 73'	Report	Williams 32', (yellow card) 69'	Stadium: Segra Field; Attendance: 1,007; Referee: Tori Penso

August 31 24	Loudoun United FC	4–0	North Carolina FC	Leesburg, Virginia
19:30 EDT	Dambrot (yellow card) 9'; Brotherton 31' (o.g.); A. Bustamante 39'; Murphy 58'; Hawkins (yellow card) 61'; Amoh 63'	Report	Wapiwo (yellow card) 86'; Storm (yellow card) 90+3'	Stadium: Segra Field; Attendance: 1,551; Referee: Thomas Snyder

September 7 25	Hartford Athletic	5–1	Loudoun United FC	Hartford, Connecticut
7:00 PM EDT	Barrera 5'; Dixon 7', 32'; Williams 10'; Swartz 40'; Jörgensen (yellow card) 54'	Report	Wild 21'; Garay (red card) 51'; Lubahn (yellow card) 62'	Stadium: Dillon Stadium; Attendance: 4,582; Referee: Elvis Osmanovic

September 13 26	Loudoun United FC	1–2	Memphis 901 FC	Leesburg, Virginia
6:30 PM	Murphy 5'; Martinez (yellow card) 34' (yellow-red card) 58'; Yow (yellow card) 54'; Lubahn (yellow card) 71'	Report	da Silva (yellow card) 52'; Metzger (yellow card) 54'; Hawkins 63' (o.g.); Allen 81'	Stadium: Segra Field; Attendance: 1,209; Referee: Jonathan Bilinski

September 18 27	Bethlehem Steel FC	5–2	Loudoun United FC	Bethlehem, Pennsylvania
7:30 PM	Chambers 35', (yellow card) 84'; Zandi 47'; Rayyan 49'; Ngalina (yellow card) 58', (goal) 80'; Picazo 90+1' (pen.)	Report	Wild 2'; Murphy 45'; Alvarez (red card) 90'	Stadium: Talen Energy Stadium; Attendance: 298; Referee: Daniel Gutierrez

September 25 28	Loudoun United FC	4–1	Swope Park Rangers	Leesburg, Virginia
7:30 PM	Wild 10', 43', 85' (pen.); Ku-DiPietro 68', (red card) 90'; Gorskie (yellow card) 81'	Report	Akhmatov (yellow card) 33'; Harris 37' (pen.), (yellow card) 40'; Vanacore-Decker (red card) 90'	Stadium: Segra Field; Attendance: 563; Referee: Natalie Simon

September 28 29	Loudoun United FC	0–2	Nashville SC	Leesburg, Virginia
7:30 PM	Amoh (yellow card) 37'; Paredes (yellow card) 60'	Report	Ríos 19'; Mensah 55'; Moloto (yellow card) 63'; Winn (yellow card) 90+4'	Stadium: Segra Field; Attendance: 2,012; Referee: Danielle Chesky

October 2 30	Loudoun United FC	1–2	Pittsburgh Riverhounds	Leesburg, Virginia
7:30 PM	Murphy 52'	Report	Brett 57'; Greenspan 62'	Stadium: Segra Field; Attendance: 617; Referee: Guido Gonzales Jr.

October 4 31	Loudoun United FC	2–0	Tampa Bay Rowdies	Leesburg, Virginia
19:30 EST (UTC−5)	Ndour (yellow card) 18', (goal) 50'; Nyeman (yellow card) 41'; Hawkins (yellow card) 64'; Wild 90+3'	Report	Guenzatti (yellow card) 64'; Siaj (yellow card) 77'	Stadium: Segra Field; Attendance: 1,738; Referee: Ismir Pekmic

October 9 32	Loudoun United FC	4–3	Saint Louis FC	Leesburg, Virginia
19:30 EST (UTC−5)	Ndour 47'; Murphy 60'; Doue (yellow card) 75'; A. Bustamante 80'; Amoh (yellow card) 90+2', (goal) 90+3'	Report	Hilton 35', 67'; Blackwood 63'; Fink (yellow card) 90+5'	Stadium: Segra Field; Attendance: 631; Referee: Sergii Demianchuk

October 13 33	Charleston Battery	1–2	Loudoun United FC	Charleston, South Carolina
2:00 PM	Bosua 6'; Mueller (yellow card) 61'; Woodbine (yellow card) 71'	Report	Ndour 11', 83'	Stadium: MUSC Health Stadium; Attendance: 2,406; Referee: Gabriele Giusti

October 19 34	Loudoun United FC	7–3	New York Red Bulls II	Leesburg, Virginia
19:30 EST (UTC−5)	Ndour 5'; A. Bustamante 13'; Murphy 33' (pen.), 36', (yellow card) 53'; Wild 42', 72'; Amoh 46'	Report	Stroud 16'; Jørgenson 65'; Sowe 90+1'	Stadium: Segra Field; Attendance: 3,014; Referee: Eric Tattersall

=== U.S. Open Cup ===
Due to their ownership by a more advanced level professional club, LUFC is one of 13 teams expressly forbidden from entering the Cup competition.

== Transfers ==
=== In ===
No.	Pos.	Player	Transferred from	Fee/notes	Date	Source
	GK	(United States) Calle Brown	(United States) Seattle Sounders FC	Free Transfer	February 12, 2019	
	MF	(El Salvador) Omar Milton Campos	(El Salvador) Dragón	Free Transfer	February 12, 2019	
	FW	(Japan) Shinya Kadono	(United States) California Golden Bears	Free Transfer	February 15, 2019	
	MF	(United States) Andrew Lubahn	(United States) Pittsburgh Riverhounds SC	Free Transfer	February 16, 2019	
	DF	(England) Harri Hawkins	(United States) Penn FC	Free Transfer	February 22, 2019	
	DF	(United States) Peabo Doue	(United States) North Carolina FC	Free Transfer	February 26, 2019	
	DF	(United States) Colin Miller	(United States) Providence Friars	Free Transfer	February 27, 2019	
	FW	(Costa Rica) Orlando Sinclair	(Costa Rica) Saprissa	Free Transfer	March 1, 2019	
	MF	(Honduras) Jack Jean Baptiste	(Honduras) Motagua	Free Transfer	March 5, 2019	
	MF	(Argentina) Ariel Fantoni	(Argentina) San Lorenzo	Free Transfer	March 5, 2019	
	MF	(United States) Connor Presley	(United States) San Antonio FC	Free Transfer	March 6, 2019	
	MF	(United States) Noah Pilato	(United States) Penn State Nittany Lions	Free Transfer	March 7, 2019	
	MF	(United States) Collin Verfurth	(United States) Virginia Tech Hokies	Free Transfer	March 8, 2019	

=== Out ===
No.	Pos.	Player	Transferred from	Fee/notes	Date	Source

== See also ==
- 2019 USL Championship season
