= Guillermo Benítez =

Guillermo Benítez is the name of:

- Guillermo Benítez (footballer, born 1993), Argentine-born Paraguayan footballer
- Guillermo Benítez (footballer, born 1999), Panamanian footballer
