= Mark Hill (Scottish footballer) =

Scottish footballer

Personal information
- Date of birth: 10 July 1998 (age 28)
- Position: Midfielder

Youth career
- 2005–2012: Hamilton Academical
- 2012–2018: Celtic

Senior career*
Years	Team	Apps	(Gls)
2018–2020	Celtic	0	(0)
2018	→ St Mirren (loan)	3	(0)
2018–2019	→ Forfar Athletic (loan)	13	(3)
2019	→ Charlotte Independence (loan)	9	(0)
2020–2021	Forfar Athletic	2	(0)

International career
2014–2015	Scotland U17	9	(0)
2015–2017	Scotland U19	6	(0)
- * Club domestic league appearances and goals

Mark Hill (born 10 July 1998) is a Scottish former professional footballer who played as a midfielder. He played for Celtic, St Mirren, Forfar Athletic, Charlotte Independence and Forfar Athletic.

== Career ==
Hill first attracted media attention as a 13-year-old in April 2012, when he was selected for the reserve team at Hamilton Academical and was said to be in contention for the club's first team. He signed for Scottish champions Celtic a few months later, making steady progress through their youth system including appearances in the UEFA Youth League, in Scottish Youth Cup final wins and in the Scottish Challenge Cup.

Hill signed a new contract with Celtic in 2017, and moved on loan to St Mirren in January 2018, making three league appearances as the club gained promotion to the Scottish Premiership as winners of the 2017–18 Scottish Championship. He returned to Celtic but was then loaned again to third-tier Forfar Athletic, becoming a regular in their team until being recalled in January 2019. Two months later, he moved to Charlotte Independence in the USL Championship for the 2019 USL season, but was recalled by Celtic on 1 August 2019.

Hill has also represented Scotland at the under-17 and under-19 levels.

== Career statistics ==
As of 8 August 2019

Appearances and goals by club, season and competition
Club	Season	League			Cup		League Cup		Other		Total	
Club	Season	Division	Apps	Goals	Apps	Goals	Apps	Goals	Apps	Goals	Apps	Goals
Celtic	2017–18	Scottish Premiership	0	0	—		0	0	0	0	0	0
Celtic	2018–19	Scottish Premiership	0	0	—		0	0	0	0	0	0
Celtic	2019–20	Scottish Premiership	0	0	—		0	0	0	0	0	0
Celtic	Total		0	0	0	0	0	0	0	0	0	0
Celtic U20/U21 (Note: Matches in the Scottish Challenge Cup, in which age-restricted teams from the SPFL Premiership clubs compete against senior clubs.)	2016–17		—						2	0	2	0
Celtic U20/U21	2017–18		—						1	0	1	0
Celtic U20/U21	2018–19		—						1	0	1	0
Celtic U20/U21	Total		0	0	0	0	0	0	4	0	4	0
St Mirren (loan)	2017–18	Scottish Championship	3	0	1	0	—		—		4	0
Forfar Athletic (loan)	2018–19	Scottish League One	13	3	1	0	—		—		14	3
Charlotte Independence (loan)	2019	USL Championship	9	0	—		—		—		9	0
Career total			25	3	2	0	0	0	4	0	31	3
