= Michaël Maria =

Footballer (born 1995)

Personal information
- Full name: Michaël Madionis Mateo Maria
- Date of birth: 31 January 1995 (age 31)
- Place of birth: Kerkrade, Netherlands
- Height: 1.76 m (5 ft 9 in)
- Positions: Left-back; defensive midfielder

Youth career
- –2003: VV Internos
- 2003–2013: PSV Eindhoven
- 2013–2014: Vitesse
- 2014: VfL Bochum

Senior career*
Years	Team	Apps	(Gls)
2014–2015	VfL Bochum II	19	(2)
2015–2016	VfL Bochum	9	(0)
2016–2017	Sonnenhof Großaspach	17	(1)
2017–2018	Erzgebirge Aue	1	(0)
2018–2019	FC Twente	16	(2)
2019	Charlotte Independence	6	(0)
2019–2020	Adelaide United	21	(1)
2021–2022	NAC Breda	27	(3)

International career^{‡}
2013–2014	Curaçao U-20	4	(2)
2015–	Curaçao	30	(2)
- * Club domestic league appearances and goals as of 14 May 2022 ‡ National team caps and goals as of 19 July 2021

Michaël Madionis Mateo Maria (born 31 January 1995) is a Curaçaoan professional footballer who plays as a left-back or defensive midfielder for the Curaçao national team.

== Club career ==
=== Adelaide United ===
In July 2019, Maria was purchased by Adelaide United and signed a two-year contract. Maria made his debut for 'The Reds' in the FFA Cup Round of 32 playing as a winger defeating the Melbourne Knights 5–2. He mutually departed from United on 18 June 2020.

=== NAC Breda ===
On 28 January 2021, Maria signed a 2.5-year contract with NAC Breda.

== International career ==
Michaël Maria has played for Curaçao at the U-20 level. He played his first full international match for Curaçao at the 2018 FIFA World Cup qualification match against Montserrat on 27 March 2015. He was substituted on in the 65th minute for Papito Merencia.

== Career statistics ==
=== Club ===
As of match played 14 May 2022

Appearances and goals by club, season and competition
Club	Season	League			National cup		Other		Total	
Club	Season	Division	Apps	Goals	Apps	Goals	Apps	Goals	Apps	Goals
VfL Bochum II	2014–15	Regionalliga West	19	2	—		—		19	2
VfL Bochum	2014–15	2. Bundesliga	0	0	0	0	—		0	0
VfL Bochum	2015–16	2. Bundesliga	9	0	0	0	—		9	0
VfL Bochum	Total		9	0	0	0	0	0	9	0
Sonnenhof Großaspach	2016–17	3. Liga	17	1	—		—		17	1
Erzgebirge Aue	2017–18	2. Bundesliga	1	0	1	0	—		2	0
Twente	2017–18	Eredivisie	6	1	1	0	—		7	0
Twente	2018–19	Eerste Divisie	9	1	1	0	—		10	1
Twente	Total		15	2	2	0	0	0	17	2
Charlotte Independence	2019	USL Championship	6	0	1	0	—		7	0
Adelaide United	2019–20	A-League	21	0	2	0	—		23	0
NAC Breda	2020–21	Eerste Divisie	13	1	0	0	2 (Note: Appearances in the Eredivisie play-offs)	1	15	2
NAC Breda	2021–22	Eerste Divisie	10	0	1	0	2	1	15	2
NAC Breda	2022–23	Eerste Divisie	0	0	0	0	0	0	0	0
NAC Breda	Total		23	1	1	0	4	2	26	4
Career total			111	6	7	0	4	2	121	8

=== International ===
As of match played 24 September 2022

Appearances and goals by national team and year
National team	Year	Apps	Goals
Curaçao	2015	5	0
Curaçao	2016	3	0
Curaçao	2017	4	0
Curaçao	2018	1	0
Curaçao	2019	7	0
Curaçao	2020	–	
Curaçao	2021	6	2
Curaçao	2022	4	0
Total		30	2

Scores and results list Curaçao's goal tally first, score column indicates score after each Maria goal.

List of international goals scored by Michaël Maria
No.	Date	Venue	Opponent	Score	Result	Competition
1	5 June 2021	Manuel Felipe Carrera Stadium, Guatemala City, Guatemala	British Virgin Islands	2–0	8–0	2022 FIFA World Cup qualification
2	5 June 2021	Manuel Felipe Carrera Stadium, Guatemala City, Guatemala	British Virgin Islands	6–0	8–0	2022 FIFA World Cup qualification

== Honours ==
Adelaide United

- FFA Cup: 2019

Curaçao

- Caribbean Cup: 2017
- King's Cup: 2019
