= Blake White =

American-born Jamaican footballer (born 2000)

Personal information
- Date of birth: 15 March 2000 (age 26)
- Place of birth: Stockbridge, Georgia, United States
- Height: 1.76 m (5 ft 9 in)
- Position: Midfielder

Youth career
- 2016–2018: Atlanta United

College career
Years	Team	Apps	(Gls)
2018–2020	UAB Blazers	35	(9)
2021–2023	Reinhardt Eagles	32	(18)

Senior career*
Years	Team	Apps	(Gls)
2018	Atlanta United 2	1	(0)
2022	Peachtree City MOBA	7	(0)

International career
2017	Jamaica U17		
- * Club domestic league appearances and goals as of 02:45, 23 April 2023 (UTC)

Blake White (born 15 March 2000) is an American-born-Jamaican footballer.

== Club career ==
On 30 June 2018, White appeared for Atlanta United 2, the USL affiliate of Atlanta United FC, as an 84-minute substitute in a 3-0 loss to Nashville SC.

Edwards has committed to playing college soccer at the University of Alabama-Birmingham from 2018 and beyond.

== International career ==
White has played for Jamaica at the U17 international level.
