= Gwinnett Field =

Baseball park in Georgia, U.S.

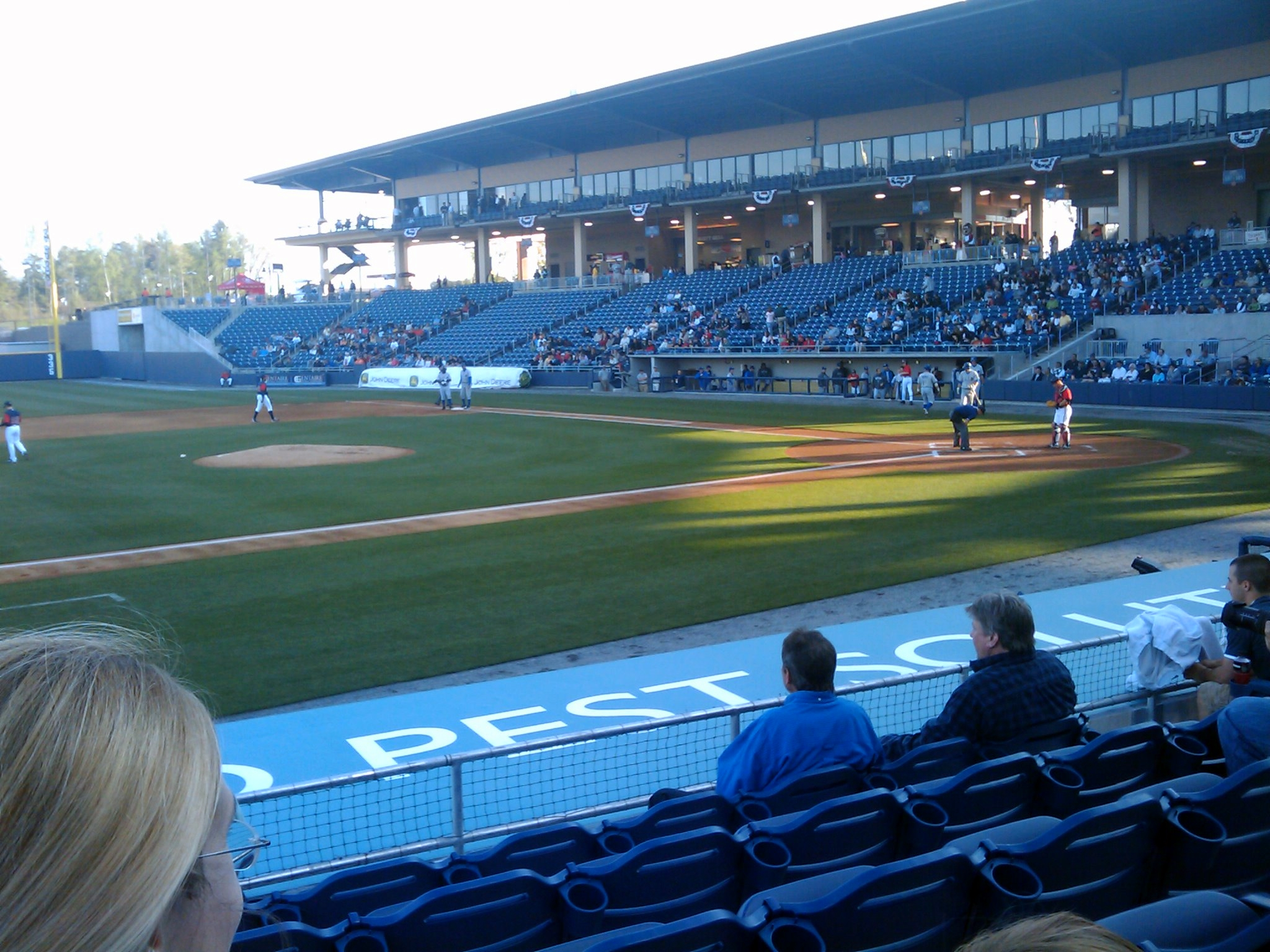

- Location within Georgia Location within the United States
- Interactive map of Gwinnett Field
- Former names: Gwinnett Stadium (2009); Coolray Field (2010–2025)
- Address: 2500 Buford Drive; Lawrenceville, Georgia; United States
- Coordinates: 34°02′26.1″N 83°59′32.6″W
- Owner: Gwinnett County
- Operator: Gwinnett County
- Capacity: 10,427 (baseball); 7,362 (soccer)
- Surface: Grass
- Field size: Left field: 335 ft (102 m); Center field: 400 ft (120 m); Right field: 335 ft (102 m)
- Public transit: Ride Gwinnett; No direct bus route connection

Construction
- Groundbreaking: June 3, 2008
- Opened: April 17, 2009
- Cost: $64 million ($96 million in 2025 dollars)
- Architect: HKS, Inc.
- Structural engineers: Bliss & Nyitray, Inc.
- Services engineers: Smith Seckman Reid, Inc.
- General contractor: Barton Malow Co.

Tenants
- Gwinnett Stripers (IL/AAAE) 2009–present Atlanta United 2 (USLC) 2018

Website
- www.milb.com/gwinnett/ballpark/gwinnett-field

Gwinnett Field (formerly known as Coolray Field) is a 10,427-seat minor league baseball park in unincorporated Gwinnett County, Georgia (with a mailing address in Lawrenceville). It is the home field of the Gwinnett Stripers, the Triple-A affiliate of the Atlanta Braves.

== History ==
Gwinnett Field hosted its first regular season baseball game on April 17, 2009, a 7–4 Gwinnett Braves loss to the Norfolk Tides. The stadium site is located approximately two miles (3 km) east of the Mall of Georgia along Georgia State Route 20, between Interstate 85 and Georgia State Route 316.

The 44-acre (18 ha) site was previously farmland and forest. An additional 73 acres (0.30 km^{2}) of mostly forest around it became a mixed-use project, after a February 2009 rezoning by the Gwinnett County Commission. The naming rights held by Coolray, an air conditioning and plumbing company based in nearby Marietta, expired after the 2025 season. In January 2026, it was reported that the ballpark name would be Gwinnett Field until a new sponsor is found.

The stadium construction and maintenance is being paid by the taxpayer-funded Gwinnett County government, but the Stripers will keep most of the revenue from ticket and concession stand sales. The municipal bonds used to pay for the stadium run for 30 years (until 2038), but the Stripers have an option to back out of the contract after only half of that time (in 2023), if the county does not maintain the facility at an acceptable level. This would leave county taxpayers responsible for the remainder.

After the first season, it was revealed that parking revenue was a fraction (about 15%) of what was expected.

The Gwinnett Braves (renamed to the Stripers in 2017) moved to the stadium in 2009 when the Atlanta Braves moved their affiliate, the Richmond Braves, after 43 seasons (1966–2008) in Richmond, Virginia. They are located 35 miles northeast of their parent club's stadium, Truist Park in unincorporated Cobb County—the third-shortest distance between a Triple-A team and its major league parent (behind only the International League's Saint Paul Saints, based 12 miles east of Minneapolis and the Pacific Coast League's Tacoma Rainiers, based 26 miles south of Seattle). They have held this distinction since moving to Gwinnett County; the Braves played at Turner Field in Atlanta at the time.

== Features ==
Gwinnett Field features 19 luxury suites, a 30-foot-by-40-foot video board in right-center field, a 6-foot-by-42-foot LED board along the left-field wall and chairback seating complete with cupholders.
