= Chad Letts =

American-born Jamaican footballer (born 2000)

Personal information
- Date of birth: 20 December 2000 (age 25)
- Place of birth: Atlanta, Georgia, United States
- Height: 1.78 m (5 ft 10 in)
- Position: Forward

Youth career
- 2014–2016: Philadelphia Union
- 2017–2019: Atlanta United

Senior career*
Years	Team	Apps	(Gls)
2019–2020	Union SG	0	(0)
2022	Long Island Rough Riders	1	(0)

International career
2016	Jamaica U17	2	(0)
- * Club domestic league appearances and goals as of 30 September 2020

Chad Letts (born 20 December 2000) is a professional footballer. Born in the United States, Letts has represented Jamaica at youth international level.

== Club career ==
=== Youth ===
Letts spent time in the Philadelphia Union and Atlanta United youth academies.

=== Senior ===
In 2019, Letts signed with Union SG in Belgium.

In 2022, Letts played for Long Island Rough Riders.

== International career ==
Letts has featured for the Jamaica U17 national team in 2016.

== Career statistics ==
=== Club ===
As of 7 July 2019.

Club	Season	League			Cup		Other		Total	
Club	Season	Division	Apps	Goals	Apps	Goals	Apps	Goals	Apps	Goals
Union SG	2018–19	Proximus League	0	0	0	0	1 (Note: Appearances in the UEFA Europa League playoffs)	0	1	0
Career total			0	0	0	0	1	0	1	0
