= Oliver Shannon =

English footballer

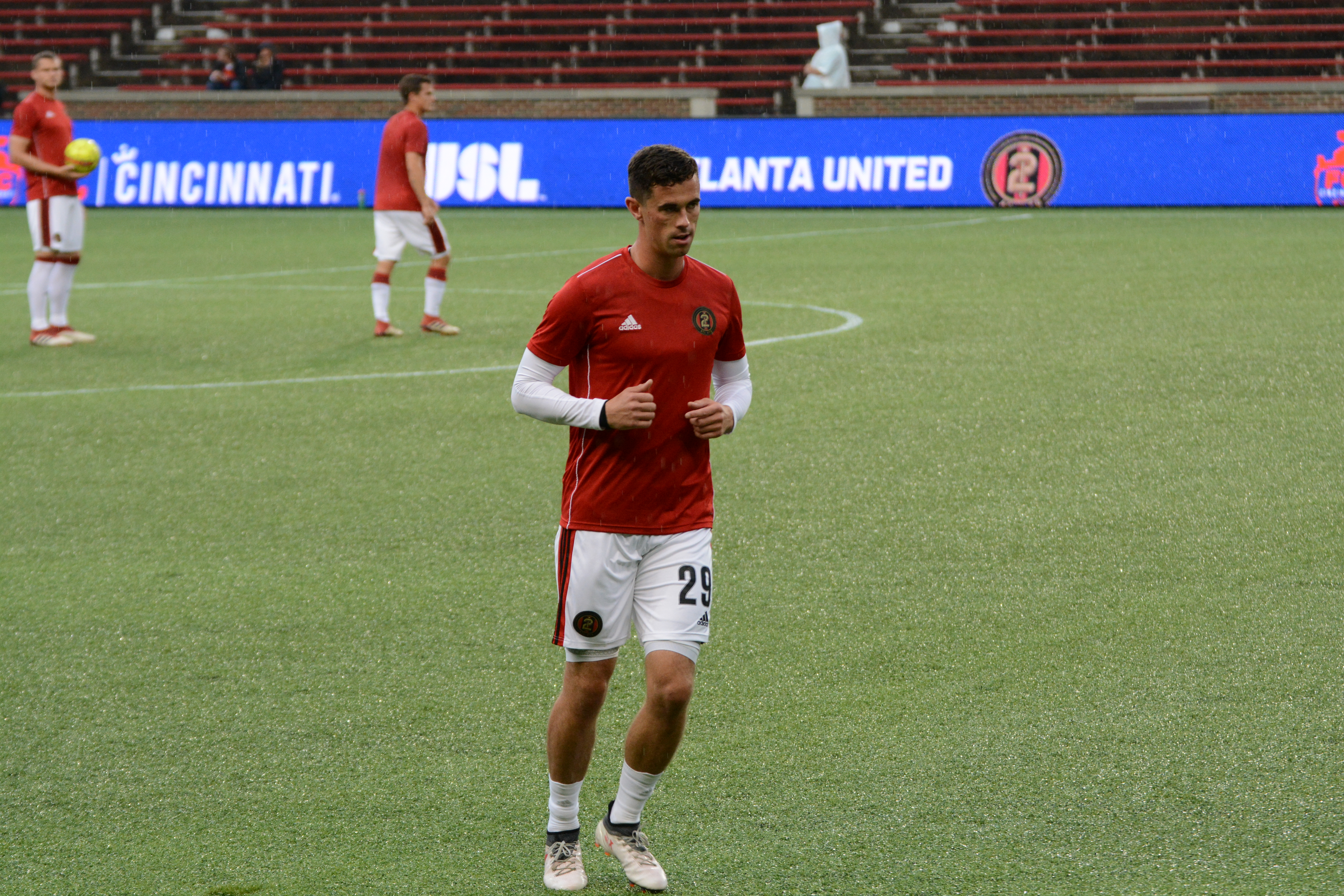

Personal information
- Date of birth: 12 September 1995 (age 31)
- Place of birth: Birkenhead, England
- Height: 1.83 m (6 ft 0 in)
- Position: Midfielder

Team information
- Current team: Bala Town

Youth career
- 2001–2014: Everton

College career
Years	Team	Apps	(Gls)
2014–2017	Clemson Tigers	82	(13)

Senior career*
Years	Team	Apps	(Gls)
2018	Atlanta United	0	(0)
2018	Atlanta United 2	27	(1)
2020–2024	Bala Town	111	(11)
2026–	Bala Town	0	(0)
- * Club domestic league appearances and goals as of 22 April 2024

Oliver Shannon (born 12 September 1995) is an English footballer who plays as a midfielder for Cymru North club Bala Town.

== College career ==
Shannon was a four-year starter at Clemson University, serving as co-captain for his final two years. He contributed 13 goals and 17 assists in 82 appearances, 74 of which he started.

== Professional career ==
Oliver Shannon was signed by Atlanta United on 21 February 2018. He made his debut for the second team on 24 March in a 3–1 win over New York Red Bulls II. He finished the season with 27 appearances and one goal for Atlanta United 2.

Shannon was released by Atlanta at the end of their 2018 season.

On 9 January 2020, Shannon joined Cymru Premier side Bala Town. He departed the club in 2024, before returning to the club in 2026.
