= Kendall Edwards =

Jamaican-born American footballer (born 2001)

Personal information
- Date of birth: February 18, 2001 (age 25)
- Place of birth: Decatur, Georgia, USA
- Height: 1.88 m (6 ft 2 in)
- Position: Defender

Team information
- Current team: NC State Wolfpack
- Number: 6

Youth career
- 2017–2019: Atlanta United

College career
Years	Team	Apps	(Gls)
2019–	NC State Wolfpack	60	(2)

Senior career*
Years	Team	Apps	(Gls)
2018–2019	Atlanta United 2	6	(0)
2021	Tobacco Road	3	(0)

International career
2017	Jamaica U17		
2018	United States U18		
- * Club domestic league appearances and goals as of July 8, 2024

Kendall Edwards (born February 18, 2001) is an American soccer player for the NC State Wolfpack.

== Club career ==
On April 8, 2018, Edwards appeared for Atlanta United 2, the USL affiliate of Atlanta United FC, starting in a 1–1 draw with Penn FC.

Edwards has committed to playing college soccer at North Carolina State University from 2019 and beyond.

Edwards was named team captain for the 2023 season at NC State.

== International career ==
Edwards has played for both the United States and Jamaican youth teams. He was called into a United States under-17 training camp in 2016, and represented the Jamaican under-17 squad in 2017 onward. On June 7, 2018, he was called up to the United States under-18's
