= Harri Hawkins =

English footballer

Personal information
- Date of birth: 28 February 1993 (age 33)
- Place of birth: Cambridge, England
- Height: 1.91 m (6 ft 3 in)
- Position: Defender

Team information
- Current team: Virginia Dream

College career
Years	Team	Apps	(Gls)
2014–2016	Hofstra Pride	58	(3)

Senior career*
Years	Team	Apps	(Gls)
2011–2013	Histon	59	(2)
2014–2015	Long Island Rough Riders	15	(0)
2016	Ventura County Fusion	6	(1)
2017	New York Cosmos B	7	(0)
2017	New York Cosmos	1	(0)
2018	Penn FC	22	(0)
2019	Loudoun United	25	(1)
2020	Greenville Triumph	5	(0)
2021–2022	Recreativo	0	(0)
2024–	Virginia Dream		
- * Club domestic league appearances and goals as of 25 October 2020

Harri Hawkins (born 28 February 1993) is an English professional footballer who plays as a defender for Virginia Dream.

== Career ==
Hawkins played with Histon in both the National League and the National League North between 2011 and 2013, before heading to the United States to play college soccer at Hofstra University. Hawkins was ineligible to play during the 2013 season, but made 59 appearances and tallied 2 goals and 1 assist between 2014 and 2016.

While at college, Hawkins played with Premier Development League sides Long Island Rough Riders and Ventura County Fusion.

After going undrafted in the 2017 MLS SuperDraft, Hawkins joined National Premier Soccer League side New York Cosmos B. On 26 August 2017, Hawkins signed with the club's first team who play in the North American Soccer League.

Hawkins signed with Loudoun United on February 22, 2019. He scored his first goal for Loudoun on August 9, 2019, in Segra Field's opener. His goal was also Loudoun's first goal in Segra Field.

Hawkins joined Greenville Triumph SC in USL League One ahead of the 2020 season. Hawkins was released by Greenville following their 2020 season.

On 12 August 2021, Hawkins joined Tercera División RFEF side Recreativo.

In the summer of 2024, Hawkins was part of the Virginia Dream side who won the National Premier Soccer League Mid-Atlantic Conference playoffs.
