= Niki Jackson =

American soccer player (born 1995)

Personal information
- Date of birth: August 25, 1995 (age 31)
- Place of birth: Vicksburg, Mississippi, United States
- Height: 5 ft 10 in (1.78 m)
- Position: Forward

Youth career
- –2007: SCSA Falcons
- 2009–2010: West Coast FC
- 2011: FC Phoenix
- 2013–2014: Real Salt Lake

College career
Years	Team	Apps	(Gls)
2014–2017	Grand Canyon Antelopes	69	(41)

Senior career*
Years	Team	Apps	(Gls)
2018–2020	Colorado Rapids	19	(3)
2018	→ Colorado Springs Switchbacks (loan)	4	(0)
2019	→ Charlotte Independence (loan)	23	(5)
2020	→ Colorado Springs Switchbacks (loan)	0	(0)
2021	San Diego Loyal	5	(0)
2021	→ South Georgia Tormenta (loan)	8	(0)
- * Club domestic league appearances and goals as of November 2, 2021

Niki Jackson (born August 25, 1995) is an American soccer player who plays as a forward. He grew up in Collierville, Tennessee and Scottsdale, Arizona before attending Cactus Shadows High School and Grand Canyon University.

== Career ==
=== Grand Canyon University ===
Jackson played four years of college soccer at Grand Canyon University between 2014 and 2017. He was coached his first year by Petar Draksin at GCU and the following three seasons by Schellas Hyndman. During his time with the Antelopes, Jackson scored 41 goals and tallied nine assists in 69 appearances. He was the program's second ever MLS SuperDraft pick after teammate Amir Šašivarević went one round earlier in the same draft.

=== Colorado Rapids ===
On January 21, 2018, Jackson was selected 73rd overall in the 2018 MLS SuperDraft by Colorado Rapids. He signed with the club on February 20, 2018. He made his professional debut on February 28, 2018, as a 66th-minute substitute during a CONCACAF Champions League game against Toronto FC. Jackson came on as a sub for his MLS debut and scored his first career goal against New England Revolution. On April 21, 2018, Jackson was loaned to United Soccer League side Colorado Springs Switchbacks FC.

On April 12, 2019, Jackson was loaned to USL side Charlotte Independence.

Following their 2020 season, Colorado opted to decline their contract option on Jackson.

=== San Diego Loyal ===
On February 11, 2021, Jackson signed with USL Championship side San Diego Loyal.

On August 6, 2021, Jackson moved on loan to USL League One side South Georgia Tormenta for the remainder of the season.
