= Valentin Sabella =

American soccer player

Valentín Sabella
Personal information
- Date of birth: 5 July 1999 (age 27)
- Place of birth: Buenos Aires, Argentina
- Height: 1.68 m (5 ft 6 in)
- Positions: Attacking midfielder; forward

Youth career
- MAST Academy

Senior career*
Years	Team	Apps	(Gls)
2019	Florida Soccer Soldiers		
2019–2021	Charlotte Independence	54	(6)
2021	→ Cancún (loan)	3	(0)
2022	Tacoma Defiance	15	(2)
2022–2023	Northern Colorado Hailstorm	18	(1)
2025	Moca	26	(3)
- * Club domestic league appearances and goals as of 13:40, 17 March 2026 (UTC)

Valentín Sabella (born 5 July 1999) is an Argentine footballer who plays as a forward.

== Career ==
After impressing for semi-professional United Premier Soccer League side Florida Soccer Soldiers in the 2019 U.S. Open Cup, Sabella signed for USL Championship side Charlotte Independence, one of the sides he helped eliminate from the competition.

On 18 March 2022, it was announced Sabella had signed with MLS Next Pro side Tacoma Defiance.

On 25 January 2023, Sabella joined USL League One side Northern Colorado Hailstorm FC.
