= Alessandro Castro =

Honduran football player (born 2000)

Personal information
- Full name: Alessandro Elias Castro Villeda
- Date of birth: February 26, 2000 (age 26)
- Place of birth: Atlanta, Georgia, United States
- Height: 5 ft 9 in (1.75 m)
- Position: Midfielder

Team information
- Current team: VfR Mannheim

Youth career
- 2014–2015: Bryson Park Soccer Club
- 2015–2016: Kalonji Soccer Academy
- 2015–2016: GSA 00 Premier
- 2016–2017: Atlanta United

Senior career*
Years	Team	Apps	(Gls)
2018–2019	Atlanta United 2	18	(1)
2020	Juticalpa	0	(0)
2022–	VfR Mannheim	3	(0)

International career^{‡}
2017	Honduras U17	2	(0)
- * Club domestic league appearances and goals as of 22:07, November 1, 2022 (UTC) ‡ National team caps and goals as of 19:41, 25 May 2018 (UTC)

Alessandro Elias Castro Villeda (born February 26, 2000) is a footballer who plays as a midfielder for VfR Mannheim in the Verbandsliga Nordbaden in Germany. Born in the United States, he represented Honduras at youth level.

== Club career ==
A native of Lilburn, Georgia, Castro joined the Atlanta United academy in 2016, initially as a part of the under-16 team. Notably, he won a U.S. Soccer Development Academy national championship in 2017 as a member of the under-17 side.

He made his professional debut with Atlanta United 2 on May 19, 2018, during a 2–1 defeat to Louisville City.

On July 5, 2018, Castro signed his first professional contract with Atlanta United 2.

== International career ==
He was selected to represent the Honduras U17s at both the 2017 CONCACAF U-17 Championship in April and the 2017 FIFA U-17 World Cup in October.
