= Alex Martínez (footballer, born 1991) =

Uruguayan footballer

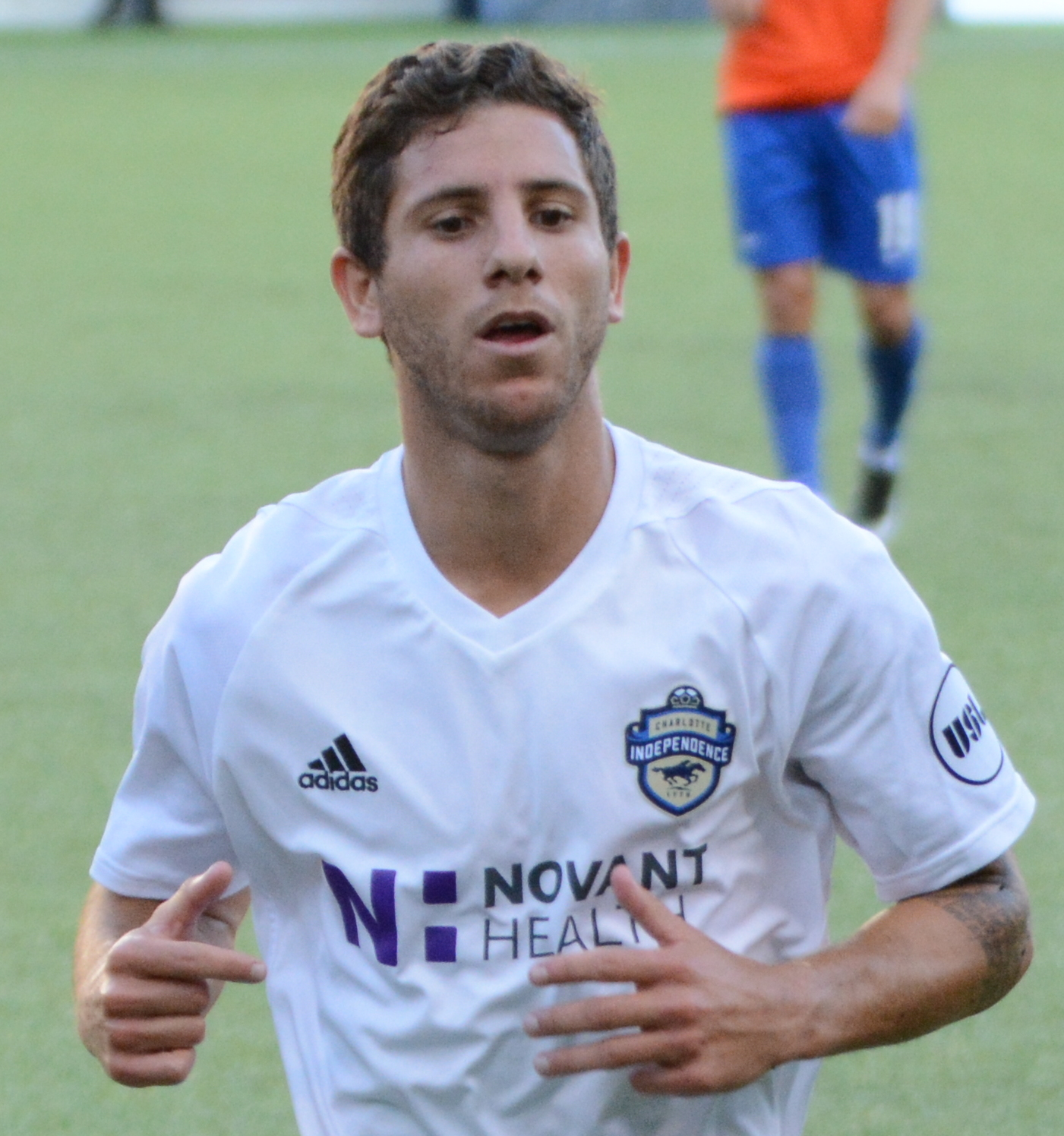
- Martínez with Charlotte Independence in 2017

Personal information
- Full name: Alex Martínez Beltrán
- Date of birth: 25 August 1991 (age 35)
- Place of birth: Montevideo, Uruguay
- Height: 1.73 m (5 ft 8 in)
- Position: Midfielder

Youth career
- Discoveries SC
- –2010: Northwestern Trojans

College career
Years	Team	Apps	(Gls)
2010–2011	High Point Panthers	40	(12)
2012–2013	NC State Wolfpack		(13)

Senior career*
Years	Team	Apps	(Gls)
2013	Carolina Dynamo	10	(2)
2014	Sporting Kansas City	10	(0)
2014	Orange County Blues	4	(1)
2014	Carolina RailHawks	2	(0)
2015–2019	Charlotte Independence	114	(9)
Total		140	(12)

Managerial career
- 2023: Birmingham Legion (assistant)
- 2024–: D.C. United (assistant)
- * Club domestic league appearances and goals

Alex Martínez Beltrán (born August 25, 1991) is a former Uruguayan professional footballer. He currently serves as an assistant coach for D.C. United of Major League Soccer.

== Career ==
=== Early career ===
Born in Montevideo, Uruguay, Martínez moved to the United States at the age of 9 and attended High Point University where he played college soccer for the High Point Panthers from 2010 to 2011. He then was recruited to play for the NC State Wolfpack where he played till 2013. He also played for Carolina Dynamo of the USL Premier Development League in 2013.

=== Sporting Kansas City ===
On January 21, 2014, Martínez was selected in the third round of the 2014 MLS SuperDraft by Sporting Kansas City and was officially signed by the Major League Soccer club on March 4, 2014. He then made his professional debut for Sporting on March 15, 2014, against FC Dallas when he came on as a 75th-minute substitute as Sporting drew 1–1. He was released by the club on June 30, 2014.

In August 2014, Martinez signed with Orange County Blues FC of United Soccer League. After the Blues' season ended, Martinez signed a short-term contract with Carolina RailHawks of the North American Soccer League.

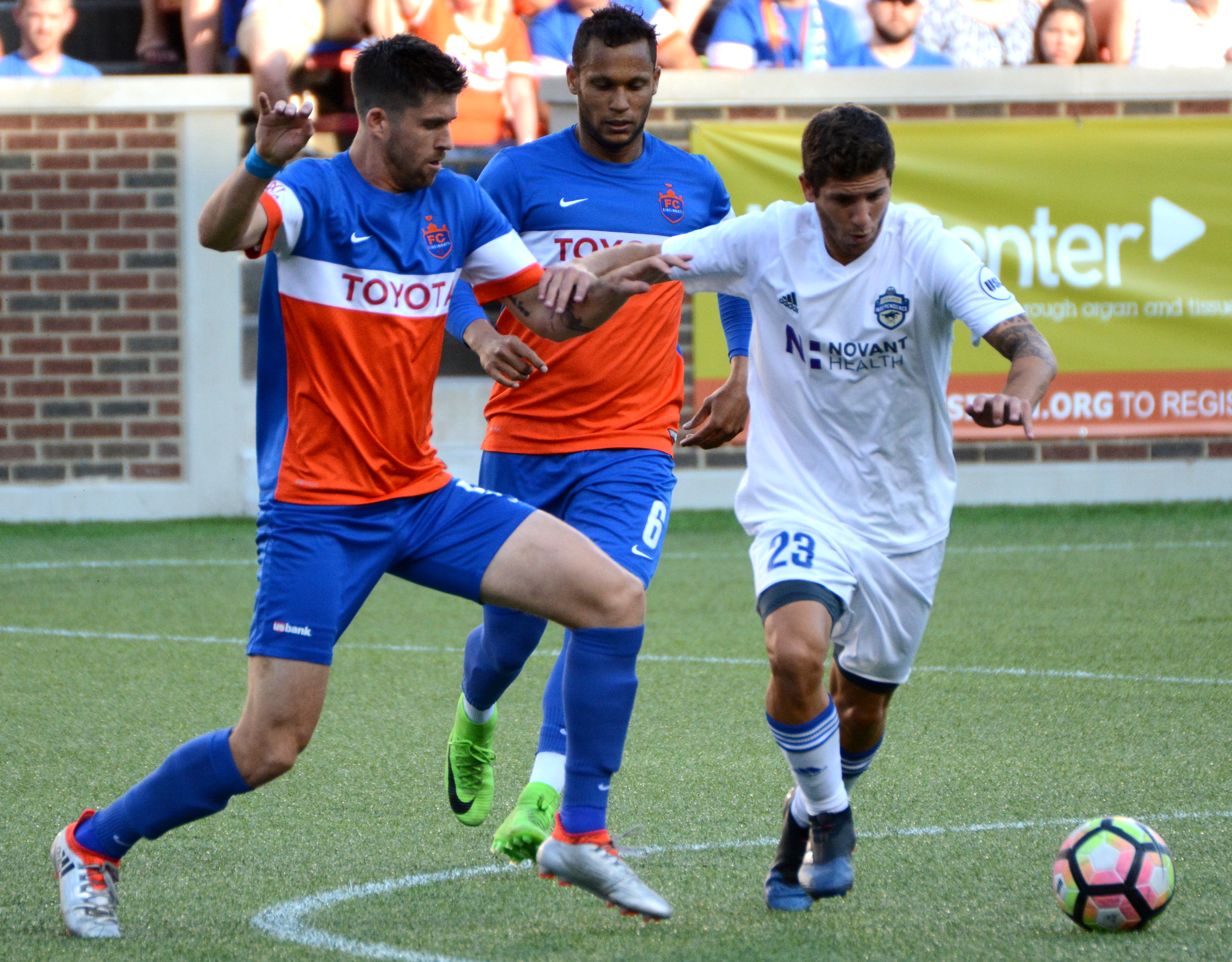
Martínez (right) with Charlotte Independence in 2017

Martinez signed with United Soccer League expansion side Charlotte Independence in March 2015.

== Coaching ==
After his retirement from playing, Martínez served as the Charlotte FC Academy's head of recruitment from 2020–2022 & Academy's U18 Head Coach (Responsible for three Academy players signing First Team Contracts and one signing Crown Legacy Contract). In March 2023, Martínez was named an assistant coach for USL Championship club Birmingham Legion. On January 23, 2024, Martínez was announced as an assistant coach for D.C. United in Major League Soccer.

== Personal life ==
He is the younger brother of Enzo Martínez who currently plays for Charlotte Independence.

== Career statistics ==
As of May 28, 2014

Club	Season	League			MLS Cup		U.S. Open Cup		CONCACAF		Total	
Club	Season	Division	Apps	Goals	Apps	Goals	Apps	Goals	Apps	Goals	Apps	Goals
Carolina Dynamo	2013	USL PDL	10	2	—	—	0	0	—	—	10	2
Sporting Kansas City	2014	MLS	11	1	—	—	0	0	0	0	7	0
Career total			17	2	0	0	0	0	0	0	17	2
