= Will Vint =

American soccer player

Personal information
- Full name: Will Ireland Vint
- Date of birth: October 12, 2001 (age 25)
- Place of birth: Chandler, Arizona, United States
- Height: 1.87 m (6 ft 2 in)
- Position: Midfielder

Youth career
- 2012–2016: Real Colorado
- 2017–2018: Manchester United
- 2018–2019: Atlanta United
- 2019: Colorado Rapids

Senior career*
Years	Team	Apps	(Gls)
2019	Atlanta United 2	16	(1)
2020–2021	Colorado Rapids	0	(0)
2020	→ Colorado Springs Switchbacks (loan)	1	(0)
2022	Charlotte Independence	17	(0)

International career
2018	United States U18		
- * Club domestic league appearances and goals as of October 16, 2022

Will Ireland Vint (born October 12, 2001) is an American professional soccer player who plays as a midfielder.

== Club career ==
Vint moved to Colorado Springs when he was three and grew up playing youth soccer for Pride Soccer and Real Colorado. He was scouted and signed by English Premier League side Manchester United, during his U15 season. Between February 2017 and August 2018, Vint played over 3,200 minutes in 56 matches for United's U15, U16, and U17 sides. In December, 2017, Vint was awarded a scholarship to stay with the club for his U17 and U18 seasons, but was forced to leave shortly after United's U18 pre-season camp due to family visa issues. He returned to the United States in August 2018 and joined Atlanta United's academy.

Vint went on to make sixteen appearances and score one goal for Atlanta United 2 during the 2019 USL Championship season. On August 20, 2019, Vint then left Atlanta and returned to his home state to join the Colorado Rapids Academy.

On March 4, 2020, Colorado Rapids announced it had signed Vint to a Homegrown Player contract after acquiring his homegrown rights from Atlanta United in exchange for a 2022 SuperDraft fourth round pick. Vint was loaned to Colorado Springs Switchbacks FC in the USL Championship on March 6. Vint started and played 74 minutes in Switchbacks FC's 2–1 loss to New Mexico United on July 11.

Following the 2021 season, Colorado declined their contract option on Vint.

On March 31, 2022, Vint signed with Charlotte Independence ahead of the 2022 USL League One season.

== Personal ==
Vint is the son of Peter Vint, the former Everton FC Academy Director and current Chief of Sport for USA Volleyball.
