= Jack Metcalf (footballer) =

English footballer

Personal information
- Full name: Jack Stephen Perry Metcalf
- Date of birth: 25 December 1991 (age 34)
- Place of birth: Liverpool, England
- Positions: Defender; midfielder

Youth career
- 2001–2009: Liverpool
- 2009–2010: Wolverhampton Wanderers

College career
Years	Team	Apps	(Gls)
2010–2013	Clemson Tigers	68	(1)

Senior career*
Years	Team	Apps	(Gls)
2015–2016	Charlotte Independence	41	(0)
2017	Bangor City	3	(0)
2018–2019	Atlanta United 2	62	(2)
2020–2022	San Diego Loyal	59	(1)
Total		165	(3)
- * Club domestic league appearances and goals

Jack Metcalf (born 25 December 1991) is an English former professional footballer.

== Career ==
=== College and amateur ===
Metcalf played with Liverpool and Wolves at youth level, before playing as an amateur while studying at Clemson University in the USA between 2010 and 2013.

=== Professional career ===
After trialling with several clubs in England, Metcalf signed with United Soccer League club Charlotte Independence in February 2015. In January 2017, Metcalf signed for Welsh club Bangor City. Following the 2022 season, Metcalf retired from playing professional football.
