= José Hernández (footballer, born 1997) =

Venezuelan footballer

Personal information
- Full name: José Rafael Hernández
- Date of birth: 26 June 1997 (age 29)
- Place of birth: Caracas, Venezuela
- Height: 1.70 m (5 ft 7 in)
- Position: Left back

Youth career
- –2014: Caracas

Senior career*
Years	Team	Apps	(Gls)
2014–2017	Caracas	25	(0)
2018–2019	Atlanta United	1	(0)
2018–2019	→ Atlanta United 2 (loan)	32	(0)
2020	Atlético Venezuela	12	(0)
2021	La Equidad (loan)	5	(0)
2022–2023	Universidad Central	4	(0)

International career^{‡}
2013	Venezuela U17	9	(0)
2017	Venezuela U20	9	(0)
2018	Venezuela U21	4	(0)
- * Club domestic league appearances and goals as of 14:43, 26 June 2021 (UTC) ‡ National team caps and goals as of 18:25, 20 October 2019 (UTC)

José Rafael Hernández (born 26 June 1997) is a Venezuelan footballer who plays as a left back.

== Club career ==
=== Atlanta United ===
Hernández signed with Atlanta United before the 2018 Major League Soccer season. After being loaned to Atlanta United 2 for over half of the season, Hernández made his first team debut vs Real Salt Lake on 22 September 2018 coming on as a substitute in the 73rd minute for George Bello.

Hernández was again loaned to Atlanta United 2 ahead of the 2019 MLS season. On 21 November 2019 the club announced they had declined Hernández's contract option.

=== Atlético Venezuela ===
On 8 January 2020 Atlético Venezuela announced they had signed Hernández.

== International career ==
Hernández was called up to the Venezuela under-20 side for the 2017 FIFA U-20 World Cup.

== Career statistics ==
=== Club ===
As of 20 October 2019.

Club	Season	League			Cup		Continental		Other		Total	
Club	Season	Division	Apps	Goals	Apps	Goals	Apps	Goals	Apps	Goals	Apps	Goals
Caracas	2013–14	Primera División	1	0	0	0	–		0	0	1	0
Caracas	2014–15	Primera División	0	0	0	0	–		0	0	0	0
Caracas	2015	Primera División	0	0	0	0	–		0	0	0	0
Caracas	2016	Primera División	10	0	0	0	–		0	0	10	0
Caracas	2017	Primera División	14	0	0	0	0	0	0	0	14	0
Caracas	Total		25	0	0	0	0	0	0	0	25	0
Atlanta United 2	2018	USL	15	0	0	0	–		0	0	15	0
Atlanta United 2	2019	USL Championship	17	0	0	0	–		0	0	17	0
Atlanta United 2	Total		32	0	0	0	0	0	0	0	32	0
Atlanta United	2018	MLS	1	0	0	0	0	0	0	0	1	0
Atlanta United	2019	MLS	0	0	0	0	0	0	0	0	0	0
Atlanta United	Total		1	0	0	0	0	0	0	0	1	0
Career total			58	0	0	0	0	0	0	0	58	0

== Honours ==
=== International ===
Venezuela U-20

- FIFA U-20 World Cup: Runner-up 2017
- South American Youth Football Championship: Third Place 2017

Venezuela U-17

- South American Under-17 Football Championship: Runner-Up 2013
