= Guillermo Benítez (footballer, born 1999) =

Panamanian footballer

Personal information
- Full name: Guillermo Josué Benítez Espinosa
- Date of birth: 5 March 1999 (age 27)
- Place of birth: Panama City, Panama
- Height: 1.79 m (5 ft 10 in)
- Position: Left back

Team information
- Current team: Tauro

Senior career*
Years	Team	Apps	(Gls)
2018–2022	Plaza Amador	47	(0)
2019	→ Atlanta United 2 (loan)	21	(1)
2023–2024	Costa del Este	38	(3)
2024–	Tauro	0	(0)

International career^{‡}
2019	Panama	1	(0)
- * Club domestic league appearances and goals as of 18:31, 14 July 2024 (UTC) ‡ National team caps and goals as of 09:33, 7 February 2019 (UTC)

Guillermo Josué Benítez Espinosa (born 5 March 1999) is a Panamanian international footballer who plays for Tauro, as a left back.

== Career ==
Benítez was born in Panama City and began his career with Plaza Amador. He signed on loan for Atlanta United 2 in January 2019.

He made his international debut for Panama in 2019.
