= 2019 North Carolina FC season =

Second season in the USL

North Carolina
2019 season
- Owner: Stephen Malik
- Head coach: Dave Sarachan
- Stadium: Sahlen's Stadium at WakeMed Soccer Park; Cary, North Carolina (Capacity: 10,000)
- USL Championship: 7th, Eastern Conference
- U.S. Open Cup: 4th Round
- Top goalscorer: League: Steven Miller (9); Robert Kristo (9); All: Robert Kristo (11)
- Highest home attendance: League/All: 6,172 (June 15 vs. Swope Park)
- Lowest home attendance: League: 2,833 (August 21 vs. Tampa Bay); All: 1,270 (May 29 vs. Florida Soccer Soldiers, USOC)
- Average home league attendance: 4,118
- Biggest win: 5–0 (August 17 vs. Pittsburgh)
- Biggest defeat: 0–4 (June 12 at NYCFC, USOC) (August 31 at Loudoun)
Home colors	Away colors

The 2019 North Carolina FC season was the club's 13th season of existence. The 2018 season was the club's first in the USL, having left the NASL at the end of the 2017 season. For the fourth time in history and the first time since 2009, North Carolina won the 2018 Southern Derby, a fan-based U.S. professional soccer cup competition between North Carolina, Charleston Battery, and Charlotte Independence. North Carolina finished the regular season in 9th place with 47 points, missing out on the playoffs by 2 points to Nashville. The 2019 season was the first under new coach Dave Sarachan who replaced Colin Clarke.

== Club ==
=== Coaching staff ===
Position	Staff
Head coach	(United States) Dave Sarachan
Assistant coach	(United States) John Bradford
Assistant coach	(United States) Clint Peay
Assistant coach	(United States) Nic Platter

=== Roster ===
No.	Position	Nation	Player
1	GK	GRE	Alex Tabakis
2	DF	USA	Manny Perez (on loan from Celtic)
3	DF	NZL	Sam Brotherton
4	MF	NGR	Victor Igbekoyi
5	MF	CMR	Duval Wapiwo (on loan from MFK Vyškov)
6	MF	USA	Austin da Luz
7	FW	CMR	Donovan Ewolo (on loan from MFK Vyškov)
8	MF	TTO	Dre Fortune
9	FW	NED	Marios Lomis
10	MF	USA	Ben Speas (on loan from Indy Eleven)
11	FW	MAW	Yamikani Chester (on loan from MFK Vyškov)
12	MF	USA	Austin Panchot
14	DF	USA	Colton Storm
15	FW	USA	Justin Rennicks (on loan from New England Revolution)
16	MF	USA	Graham Smith
17	DF	USA	Timmy Mehl
18	FW	BIH	Robert Kristo
20	MF	USA	Ryan Spaulding
21	MF	PLE	Nazmi Albadawi (on loan from FC Cincinnati)
22	DF	USA	Caleb Duvernay
23	DF	CAN	Alex Comsia
24	GK	CAN	Darrin MacLeod
27	DF	USA	D.J. Taylor
31	MF	USA	Steven Miller
33	DF	MEX	Aarón Guillén
34	MF	USA	Colton Pleasants
35	DF	USA	Adam Armour
36	GK	USA	Trace Alphin
40	GK	USA	Ryan Cretens

North Carolina FC Youth Academy Contract

== Competitions ==
Win Draw Loss

=== Friendlies ===
February 9	North Carolina FC	3–0	UNC Wilmington	Cary, North Carolina
				Stadium: WakeMed Soccer Park; Attendance: Closed-door
Note: Match stats not publicized.

February 12	Duke University	–	North Carolina FC	Durham, North Carolina
				Stadium: Duke University Training Field
Note: Match was cancelled on February 11 announced by the club.

February 16	North Carolina FC	3–2	UNC-Chapel Hill	Chapel Hill, North Carolina
				Stadium: Soccer Field Center

February 23	North Carolina FC	0–1	Charlotte Independence	Raleigh, North Carolina
			Martínez	Stadium: Cardinal Gibbons High School

March 2	North Carolina FC	—	Charleston Battery	Cary, North Carolina
		Report		Stadium: WakeMed Soccer Park
Note: Cancelled due to inclement weather.

March 23 Friendship Cup	North Carolina FC (United States)	2–1	(Mexico) Club Necaxa	Cary, North Carolina
15:30 EST	Panchot 20'; Duvernay 25'; Igbekoyi (yellow card) 45+'	Report	Campos 67'	Stadium: WakeMed Soccer Park; Attendance: 4,220

=== USL Championship ===
==== Standings ====
Pos	Team	Pld	W	D	L	GF	GA	GD	Pts	Qualification
5	Tampa Bay Rowdies	34	16	10	8	61	33	+28	58	Conference Quarterfinals
6	New York Red Bulls II	34	17	6	11	74	51	+23	57	Conference Quarterfinals
7	North Carolina FC	34	16	8	10	57	37	+20	56	Play-In Round
8	Ottawa Fury FC	34	14	10	10	50	43	+7	52	Play-In Round
9	Charleston Battery	34	11	13	10	44	44	0	46	Play-In Round

Source: USL Championship Standings
Rules for classification: 1) total wins; 2) total goal differential; 3) total goals scored; 4) points earned against top four Conference finishers; 5) disciplinary points; 6) coin toss or drawing of lots

==== Results by round ====
Round	1	2	3	4	5	6	7	8	9	10	11	12	13	14	15	16	17	18	19	20	21	22	23	24	25	26	27	28	29	30	31	32	33	34
Stadium	H	A	H	H	A	A	H	A	A	H	A	A	A	H	A	H	H	A	H	A	H	H	A	H	H	A	A	H	A	A	H	H	A	H
Result	W	W	D	D	L	W	W	D	L	D	W	D	W	W	D	W	D	L	W	L	W	L	W	W	W	L	L	D	L	L	W	W	L	W
Position	1	1	3	3	7	5	4	4	7	8	4	7	6	5	5	4	4	4	4	4	4	5	5	5	2	5	6	6	6	7	7	7	7	7

Source: Match reports
A = Away; H = Home; W = Win; D = Draw; L = Loss

==== Matches ====
March 9 1	North Carolina FC	4–1	Louisville City FC	Cary, North Carolina
16:00 EST	Lomis 34'; McCabe 50'; Ewolo 53'; Kristo 83'	Report	Jane 90+4'	Stadium: Sahlen's Stadium at WakeMed Soccer Park; Attendance: 3,213; Referee: Matt Franz

March 16 2	Bethlehem Steel FC	0–1	North Carolina FC	Bethlehem, Pennsylvania
19:00 EDT		Report	Lomis (penalty missed) 45+2', 51'; Guillén (yellow card) 63'	Stadium: Goodman Stadium; Attendance: 737; Referee: Lorant Varga

March 30 3 Southern Derby	North Carolina FC	1–1	Charleston Battery	Cary, North Carolina
19:00 EDT	da Luz (yellow card) 45+1'; Brotherton (yellow card) 78'; McCabe 90+3'	Report	Svantesson 69'; Candela (yellow card) 81'; Bolt (yellow card) 90'	Stadium: Sahlen's Stadium at WakeMed Soccer Park; Attendance: 3,584; Referee: Elvis Osmanovic

April 6 4	North Carolina FC	1–1	Memphis 901 FC	Cary, North Carolina
19:00 EDT	da Luz (red card) 62'; Lomis 78'; Taylor (yellow card) 85'	Report	Burch 64' (pen.)	Stadium: Sahlen's Stadium at WakeMed Soccer Park; Attendance: 3,629; Referee: Guido Gonzales, Jr.

April 13 5	Atlanta United 2	2–1	North Carolina FC	Kennesaw, Georgia
19:30 EDT	Wild 21'; Vint (yellow card) 62'; Conway 67'	Report	Lomis 36'; Smith (yellow card) 43'	Stadium: Fifth Third Bank Stadium; Attendance: 2,007; Referee: Aleksandar Zhelyazkov

April 20 6 Southern Derby	Charlotte Independence	0–3	North Carolina FC	Matthews, North Carolina
19:00 EDT	Maria (yellow card) 67'	Report	Comsia (yellow card) 45+1' da Luz 45+2'; Lomis 73'; Speas 85'	Stadium: Sportsplex at Matthews; Attendance: 1,569; Referee: Ismir Pekmic

April 27 7	North Carolina FC	4–1	Hartford Athletic	Cary, North Carolina
19:00 EDT	Lomis 5'; Brotherton 45+2', (yellow card) 52'; Miller 47'; Kristo 81'	Report	Gentile (yellow card) 41'; Dixon 58'; Curinga (yellow card) 90+2'	Stadium: Sahlen's Stadium at WakeMed Soccer Park; Attendance: 5,097; Referee: Gabriele Giusti

May 4 8	Indy Eleven	0–0	North Carolina FC	Indianapolis, Indiana
19:00 EDT	Diakhate (yellow card) 90+1'	Report		Stadium: Lucas Oil Stadium; Attendance: 9,017; Referee: Sergii Demianchuk

May 12 9	Ottawa Fury	2–1	North Carolina FC	Ottawa, Ontario
14:00 EDT	Samb 41', (yellow card) 42'; Oliviera 70'	Report	Smith (yellow card) 13'; Miller 66'; Brotherton (yellow card) 74'	Stadium: TD Place Stadium; Attendance: 3,551; Referee: Fabrizio Stasolla

May 18 10	North Carolina FC	0–0	Birmingham Legion FC	Cary, North Carolina
19:00 EDT	Brotherton (yellow card) 89'	Report	Hollinger-Janzen (yellow card) 45'; Herivaux (yellow card) 88' (yellow-red card) 90+2'	Stadium: Sahlen's Stadium at WakeMed Soccer Park; Attendance: 5,448; Referee: Adam Kilpatrick

May 24 11	New York Red Bulls II	1–2	North Carolina FC	Montclair, New Jersey
19:00 EDT	Stroud (yellow card) 50', (goal) 77'; Scarlett (yellow card) 90+6'	Report	Brotherton 14'; Miller 38'; Fortune (yellow card) 41'; Ewolo (red card) 59'; Comsia (yellow card) 63'	Stadium: MSU Soccer Park at Pittser Field; Attendance: 941; Referee: Silviu Petrescu

June 1 12	Hartford Athletic	1–1	North Carolina FC	East Hartford, Connecticut
19:00 EDT	Swartz 1'; Curinga (yellow card) 23'; Lee (yellow card) 57'	Report	Chester 58'; Guillén (yellow card) 61'	Stadium: Rentschler Field; Attendance: 5,003; Referee: Mark Allatin

June 8 13	Tampa Bay Rowdies	1–3	North Carolina FC	St. Petersburg, Florida
19:30 EDT	Steinberger 54'; Hoppenot (yellow card) 61'	Report	Fortune 19', 48'; Albadawi (yellow card) 28'; Miller 77'	Stadium: Al Lang Stadium; Attendance: 5,167; Referee: Rosendo Mendoza

June 15 14	North Carolina FC	2–0	Swope Park Rangers	Cary, North Carolina
17:00 EDT	Chester 6', (yellow card) 28'; Fortune 13'; Guillén (yellow card) 50'	Report	Andrade (yellow card) 63'	Stadium: Sahlen's Stadium at WakeMed Soccer Park; Attendance: 6,172; Referee: Eric Tattersall

June 22 15	Saint Louis FC	2–2	North Carolina FC	St. Louis, Missouri
20:30 EDT	Dikwa 47'; Cicerone (yellow card) 62'; Fink 90+1' (pen.)	Report	Ewolo 32'; Fortune (yellow card) 46'; Miller 81'	Stadium: Toyota Stadium; Attendance: 5,963; Referee: Jon Freemon

June 29 16	North Carolina FC	1–0	Nashville SC	Cary, North Carolina
19:00 EDT	Speas 30'; Taylor (yellow card) 90+1'	Report		Stadium: Sahlen's Stadium at WakeMed Soccer Park; Attendance: 3,662; Referee: Guido Gonzales Jr.

July 4 17 Southern Derby	North Carolina FC	1–1	Charlotte Independence	Cary, North Carolina
19:00 EDT	Chester 3'; Miller (yellow card) 75'	Report	Jackson 14'; George (yellow card) 76'	Stadium: Sahlen's Stadium at WakeMed Soccer Park; Attendance: 4,456; Referee: Matthew Franz

July 13 18	Birmingham Legion FC	1–0	North Carolina FC	Birmingham, Alabama
20:30 EDT	Williams (yellow card) 45+1'; Wright 79', (yellow card) 90+4'	Report	Chester (yellow card) 52'; Fortune (yellow card) 54'	Stadium: BBVA Compass Field; Attendance: 4,277; Referee: Luis Guardia

July 17 19	North Carolina FC	3–0	Loudoun United FC	Cary, North Carolina
19:00 EDT	Kristo 10'; Wapiwo (yellow card) 65'; Chester 72', 74'	Report		Stadium: Sahlen's Stadium at WakeMed Soccer Park; Attendance: 3,273; Referee: Elvis Osmanovic

July 20 20	Pittsburgh Riverhounds	1–0	North Carolina FC	Pittsburgh, Pennsylvania
19:00 EDT	Mertz 27' dos Santos (yellow card) 75'; Forbes (penalty missed) 88'	Report		Stadium: Highmark Stadium; Attendance: 8,391; Referee: Ismir Pekmic

July 27 21	North Carolina FC	4–2	Atlanta United 2	Cary, North Carolina
19:00 EDT	Ewolo 7', 45'; Miller 15', 19'	Report	Vint 34'; Kanakimana 41'; Carleton (yellow card) 66'	Stadium: Sahlen's Stadium at WakeMed Soccer Park; Attendance: 4,175; Referee: Gustavo Solorio

August 3 22	North Carolina FC	1–2	Indy Eleven	Cary, North Carolina
19:00 EDT	Guillén (yellow card) 27'; Albadawi (yellow card) 43'; Fortune 69'; Speas (yellow card) 90+4'	Report	Watson 15'; Barrett (yellow card) 84'; Ilić 87'	Stadium: Sahlen's Stadium at WakeMed Soccer Park; Attendance: 4,393; Referee: Guido Gonzales Jr.

August 10 23	Memphis 901 FC	1–2	North Carolina FC	Memphis, Tennessee
20:30 EDT	Allen 20'; Burch (yellow card) 79' da Silva (yellow card) 81'	Report	Fortune (yellow card) 28'; Ewolo 45+1'; Comsia (yellow card) 56'; Albadawi 88'	Stadium: AutoZone Park; Attendance: 7,006; Referee: Lorant Varga

August 17 24	North Carolina FC	5–0	Pittsburgh Riverhounds	Cary, North Carolina
19:00 EDT	Comsia (yellow card) 27'; Fortune 45+1' (pen.), 59'; Ewolo 50', (penalty missed) 57', 57'; Smith (yellow card) 53'; Kristo 74'	Report	Vancaeyezeele (red card) 44'; Forbes (yellow card) 56'; James (yellow card) 69'	Stadium: Sahlen's Stadium at WakeMed Soccer Park; Attendance: 3,108; Referee: Jon Freemon

August 21 25	North Carolina FC	4–2	Tampa Bay Rowdies	Cary, North Carolina
19:00 EDT	Fortune 19'; Miller 50', 79'; Diakité 76' (o.g.)	Report	Guenzatti 32'; Diakité (yellow card) 72'; Tejada 90'	Stadium: Sahlen's Stadium at WakeMed Soccer Park; Attendance: 2,833; Referee: Michael Radchuk
Note: Broadcast on ESPNews as part of the USL Championship Game of the Week

August 24 26	Louisville City FC	1–0	North Carolina FC	Louisville, Kentucky
15:00 EDT	Rasmussen 55', (yellow card) 74'; Totsch (yellow card) 76'; McMahon (yellow card) 84'	Report	Miller (yellow card) 78'	Stadium: Louisville Slugger Field; Attendance: 9,168; Referee: Elvis Osmanovic

August 31 27	Loudoun United FC	4–0	North Carolina FC	Loudoun County, Virginia
19:30 EDT	Dambrot (yellow card) 9'; Brotherton 31' (o.g.); A. Bustamante 39'; Murphy 58'; Hawkins (yellow card) 61'; Amoh 63'	Report	Wapiwo (yellow card) 86'; Storm (yellow card) 90+3'	Stadium: Loudoun United Stadium; Attendance: 1,551; Referee: Thomas Snyder

September 7 28	North Carolina FC	3–3	Bethlehem Steel FC	Cary, North Carolina
19:00 EDT	da Luz 9'; Brotherton (yellow card) 16'; Kristo 20', 47', (yellow card) 48'; Wapiwo (yellow card) 85'	Report	Scintu 45'; Chambers 60'; Borgelin 84'	Stadium: Sahlen's Stadium at WakeMed Soccer Park; Attendance: 3,457; Referee: Jonathan Bilinski

September 14 29	Swope Park Rangers	1–0	North Carolina FC	Kansas City, Kansas
17:00 EDT	Harris 58'; Akhmatov (yellow card) 90+2'	Report	Perez (yellow card) 88' da Luz (yellow card) 90+1'	Stadium: Children's Mercy Park; Attendance: 429; Referee: Tori Penso

September 22 30 Southern Derby	Charleston Battery	2–1	North Carolina FC	Charleston, South Carolina
14:00 EDT	Anunga 44' van Schaik (yellow card) 89'; Rittmeyer 90+3'	Report	Albadawi 49'; Taylor (yellow card) 64'	Stadium: MUSC Health Stadium; Attendance: 3,039; Referee: Kevin Broadley

September 28 31	North Carolina FC	3–1	Ottawa Fury	Cary, North Carolina
19:00 EDT	Albadawi (yellow card) 10', (goal) 89'; Guillén (yellow card) 26'; Brotherton 53'; Fortune (yellow card) 63'; Kristo 82', (yellow card) 82'	Report	De Freitas 4'; Fall (yellow card) 44'; Gagnon-Laparé (yellow card) 45+2'; Tissot (yellow card) 90+4'	Stadium: Sahlen's Stadium at WakeMed Soccer Park; Attendance: 3,233; Referee: Dejan Susak

October 5 32	North Carolina FC	2–0	New York Red Bulls II	Cary, North Carolina
19:00 EDT	Ewolo (penalty missed) 7', 7'; Kristo 50'	Report	Kilwien (yellow card) 7'; Scarlett (yellow card) 87'	Stadium: Sahlen's Stadium at WakeMed Soccer Park; Attendance: 4,293; Referee: Jon Freemon

October 12 33	Nashville SC	2–0	North Carolina FC	Nashville, Tennessee
20:00 EDT	Mensah 32'; King (yellow card) 55'; Moloto 70'	Report	Brotherton (yellow card) 3'	Stadium: Nissan Stadium; Attendance: 9,101; Referee: Rosendo Mendoza

October 19 34	North Carolina FC	1–0	Saint Louis FC	Cary, North Carolina
19:00 EDT	da Luz (yellow card) 50'; Kristo 90'	Report	Reynolds (yellow card) 89'	Stadium: Sahlen's Stadium at WakeMed Soccer Park; Attendance: 5,982; Referee: Ismir Pekmic

==== Playoffs ====
October 23 Play-In	North Carolina FC	2–3	Birmingham Legion FC	Cary, North Carolina
19:00 EDT	Albadawi 19', (yellow card) 40'; Fortune 59', (yellow card) 61'	Report	Hollinger-Janzen 35'; Herivaux 66'; Williams 90+3'	Stadium: Sahlen's Stadium at WakeMed Soccer Park; Attendance: 3,675; Referee: Tim Ford

=== U.S. Open Cup ===
As a member of the USL Championship, North Carolina FC entered the tournament in the second round.

May 15 Second Round	North Carolina FC	4–1	(Virginia) Richmond Kickers	Cary, North Carolina
19:00 EDT	Fortune 16', (yellow card) 53'; McCabe (yellow card) 47'; Kristo 52', 61' (pen.); Chester 70'; Wapiwo (yellow card) 82'	Report	Ackwei 34', (yellow card) 61'	Stadium: Sahlen's Stadium at WakeMed Soccer Park; Attendance: 1,553; Referee: Joshua Escobar

May 29 Third Round	North Carolina FC	1–0	Florida Soccer Soldiers	Cary, North Carolina
19:00 EDT	Mehl (yellow card) 21'; Taylor 47'; Wapiwo (yellow card) 71'	Report	Sabella (yellow card) 45+5'; Olivares (yellow card) 90+3'; Meneses (red card) 90+4'	Stadium: Koka Booth (Field 2) at WakeMed Soccer Park; Attendance: 1,270; Referee: Gustavo Solorio

June 12 Fourth Round	New York City FC (New York (state))	4–0	North Carolina FC	Queens, New York
19:00 EDT	Guillén 25' (o.g.); Bedoya (yellow card) 41'; Medina 45+2'; Parks 52', 76'; Haak (yellow card) 66'	Report	Smith (yellow card) 62'	Stadium: Belson Stadium; Attendance: 2,014; Referee: Lorant Varga

Schedule Source

== Squad statistics ==
Source: Match reports

=== Appearances and goals ===
No.	Pos	Nat	Player	Total		USL Championship Regular Season		USL Championship Playoffs		U.S. Open Cup	
No.	Pos	Nat	Player	Apps	Goals	Apps	Goals	Apps	Goals	Apps	Goals
1	GK	(Greece) GRE	Alex Tambakis	31	0	29	0	1	0	1	0
2	DF	(United States) USA	Manny Perez	23	0	12+8	0	0+1	0	2	0
3	DF	(New Zealand) NZL	Sam Brotherton	33	3	31	3	1	0	1	0
4	MF	(Nigeria) NGR	Victor Igbekoyi	13	0	9+4	0	0	0	0	0
5	MF	(Cameroon) CMR	Duval Wapiwo	7	0	2+3	0	0	0	2	0
6	MF	(United States) USA	Austin da Luz	18	2	9+8	2	0	0	0+1	0
7	FW	(Cameroon) CMR	Donovan Ewolo	34	8	25+5	8	0+1	0	2+1	0
8	MF	(Trinidad and Tobago) TTO	Dre Fortune	30	9	23+3	7	1	1	3	1
9	FW	(Netherlands) NED	Marios Lomis	14	6	11+2	6	1	0	0	0
10	MF	(United States) USA	Ben Speas	29	2	27	2	1	0	1	0
11	FW	(Malawi) MAW	Yamikani Chester	24	6	9+12	5	0	0	1+2	1
12	MF	(United States) USA	Austin Panchot	7	0	2+3	0	0	0	1+1	0
14	DF	(United States) USA	Colton Storm	2	0	1+1	0	0	0	0	0
15	MF	(United States) USA	Justin Rennicks	10	0	3+7	0	0	0	0	0
16	MF	(United States) USA	Graham Smith	32	0	19+9	0	1	0	2+1	0
17	DF	(United States) USA	Timmy Mehl	3	0	1	0	0	0	2	0
18	FW	(Bosnia and Herzegovina) BIH	Robert Kristo	28	11	7+18	9	0+1	0	2	2
21	MF	(Palestine) PLE	Nazmi Albadawi	20	4	16+2	3	1	1	1	0
22	DF	(United States) USA	Caleb Duvernay	17	0	9+5	0	0	0	2+1	0
23	DF	(Canada) CAN	Alex Comsia	29	0	27	0	1	0	1	0
24	GK	(Canada) CAN	Darrin MacLeod	7	0	5	0	0	0	2	0
26	MF	(United States) USA	Tommy McCabe	10	2	8+1	2	0	0	1	0
27	DF	(United States) USA	D.J. Taylor	37	1	32+1	0	1	0	2+1	1
31	MF	(United States) USA	Steven Miller	35	9	26+6	9	1	0	1+1	0
33	DF	(Mexico) MEX	Aarón Guillén	35	0	31	0	1	0	3	0

=== Goal scorers ===
Place	Position	Nation	Number	Name	USL Championship Regular Season	USL Championship Playoffs	U.S. Open Cup	Total
1	FW	(Bosnia and Herzegovina)	18	Robert Kristo	9	0	2	11
2	MF	(United States)	31	Steven Miller	9	0	0	9
2	MF	(Trinidad and Tobago)	8	Dre Fortune	7	1	1	9
4	FW	(Cameroon)	7	Donovan Ewolo	8	0	0	8
5	FW	(Netherlands)	9	Marios Lomis	6	0	0	6
5	FW	(Malawi)	11	Yamikani Chester	5	0	1	6
7	MF	(Palestine)	21	Nazmi Albadawi	3	1	0	4
8	DF	(New Zealand)	3	Sam Brotherton	3	0	0	3
9	FW	(United States)	26	Tommy McCabe	2	0	0	2
9	FW	(United States)	10	Ben Speas	2	0	0	2
9	MF	(United States)	6	Austin da Luz	2	0	0	2
12	DF	(United States)	27	D. J. Taylor	0	0	1	1
Own goals by opponent					1	0	0	1
TOTALS					57	2	5	64

=== Disciplinary record ===
Number	Nation	Position	Name	USL Championship Regular Season		USL Championship Playoffs		U.S. Open Cup		Total	
Number	Nation	Position	Name	Yellow card	Red card	Yellow card	Red card	Yellow card	Red card	Yellow card	Red card
8	(Trinidad and Tobago)	MF	Dre Fortune	5	0	1	0	1	0	7	0
3	(New Zealand)	DF	Sam Brotherton	6	0	0	0	0	0	6	0
31	(Mexico)	DF	Aarón Guillén	5	0	0	0	0	0	5	0
5	(Cameroon)	MF	Duval Wapiwo	3	0	0	0	2	0	5	0
23	(Canada)	DF	Alex Comsia	4	0	0	0	0	0	4	0
21	(Palestine)	MF	Nazmi Albadawi	3	0	1	0	0	0	4	0
16	(United States)	MF	Graham Smith	3	0	0	0	1	0	4	0
6	(United States)	MF	Austin da Luz	3	1	0	0	0	0	3	1
27	(United States)	DF	D.J. Taylor	3	0	0	0	0	0	3	0
11	(Malawi)	FW	Yamikani Chester	2	0	0	0	0	0	2	0
31	(United States)	MF	Steven Miller	2	0	0	0	0	0	2	0
18	(Bosnia and Herzegovina)	FW	Robert Kristo	2	0	0	0	0	0	2	0
7	(Cameroon)	FW	Donovan Ewolo	0	1	0	0	0	0	0	1
10	(United States)	MF	Ben Speas	1	0	0	0	0	0	1	0
14	(United States)	DF	Colton Storm	1	0	0	0	0	0	1	0
2	(United States)	DF	Manny Perez	1	0	0	0	0	0	1	0
26	(United States)	MF	Tommy McCabe	0	0	0	0	1	0	1	0
17	(United States)	DF	Timmy Mehl	0	0	0	0	1	0	1	0
TOTALS				43	2	2	0	6	0	51	2
