= 2020 North Carolina FC season =

North Carolina FC
2020 season
- Owner: Stephen Malik
- Head coach: Dave Sarachan
- Stadium: Sahlen's Stadium at WakeMed Soccer Park; Cary, North Carolina (Capacity: 10,000)
- USL: Group G: 3rd Conference: 10th
- USL Playoffs: Did not qualify
- Top goalscorer: League: Fortune (6); All: Fortune (6)
- Highest home attendance: League/All: 3,515 (March 7 vs. Louisville)
- Lowest home attendance: League/All: 432 (October 3 vs. Charlotte) (six home games played without crowd because of COVID-19 pandemic)
- Average home league attendance: 1,974
- Biggest win: NY 0–3 NC (September 30)
- Biggest defeat: NC 0–3 CHS (August 19)
Home colours	Away colours

The 2020 North Carolina FC season was the 14th season for North Carolina FC and its second in the USL Championship, the second-tier professional soccer league in the United States.

The season was suspended March 12 after the opening week because of the COVID-19 pandemic. It restarted July 11 with a restructured format and schedule, with NCFC's first game scheduled for July 17.

The team partnered with rapper J. Cole's Dreamville Festival for kit sponsorship for the season.

== Roster ==
As of 26 April 2021

No.	Position	Nation	Player
7	MF	BRA	Pecka
10	MF	PLE	Nazmi Albadawi
11	FW	BIH	Robert Kristo
15	DF	SEN	Malick Mbaye
--	MF	USA	Luis Arriaga
--	MF	SLV	Nelson Blanco
--	MF	USA	Josh Coan
--	DF	USA	Max Flick
--	MF	CAN	Malyk Hamilton
--	MF	SLE	Jay Tee Kamara (on loan from Louisville City FC)
--	GK	USA	Damian Las (on loan from Fulham FC)
--	MF	CUW	Shermaine Martina
--	DF	USA	Nelson Martinez
--	GK	USA	Jake McGuire
--	MF	USA	Selmir Miscic (on loan from Philadelphia Union)

North Carolina FC Youth Academy Contract

== Competitions ==
=== Friendlies ===
February 8	North Carolina FC	v	Richmond Kickers	Cary, NC
12:30 PM EST				Stadium: WakeMed Soccer Park
Note: Result not published.

February 15	Charlotte Independence	1–1	North Carolina FC	Matthews, NC
2:00 PM EST	Goal	Report	Miller 7'	Stadium: Sportsplex at Matthews

February 22	North Carolina FC	v	Loudoun United FC	Cary, NC
1:00 PM EST				Stadium: WakeMed Soccer Park
Note: Canceled

February 29	North Carolina FC	1–2	Greenville Triumph SC	Cary, NC
3:00 PM EST	Albadawi	Report	Pilato; Morrell	Stadium: WakeMed Soccer Park

=== USL Championship ===
==== Standings — Group G ====
Pos	Team	Pld	W	D	L	GF	GA	GD	Pts	PPG	Qualification
1	Charlotte Independence	16	8	4	4	24	22	+2	28	1.75	Advance to USL Championship Playoffs
2	Birmingham Legion FC	16	7	4	5	29	19	+10	25	1.56	Advance to USL Championship Playoffs
3	North Carolina FC	15	6	1	8	17	21	−4	19	1.27	
4	Memphis 901 FC	15	4	4	7	24	31	−7	16	1.07	

Source: USL

==== Match results ====
All games broadcast on ESPN+ as part of the USL Championship's rights agreement with the platform. Home games broadcast locally on WRAL-2.

March 7 1	North Carolina FC	0–1	Louisville City FC	Cary, NC
2:30 PM EST	Kristo (yellow card) 88'; Taylor (yellow card) 90+3'	Report	Lancaster 63'	Stadium: WakeMed Soccer Park; Attendance: 3,515; Referee: Adam Kilpatrick

July 17 2	Tampa Bay Rowdies	2–2	North Carolina FC	St. Petersburg, FL
6:45 PM EDT	Guenzatti 7'; Fernandes 22'; Mkosana (yellow card) 40'	Report	Fortune 56'; Kristo 83'	Stadium: Al Lang Stadium; Attendance: 141; Referee: Gabriele Giusti

July 29	Charlotte Independence	v	North Carolina FC	Matthews, NC
TBA PM EDT				Stadium: Sportsplex at Matthews
Note: Postponed until August 26 because of the ongoing COVID-19 pandemic.

August 1 3	North Carolina FC	1–0	Birmingham Legion FC	Cary, NC
7:00 PM EDT	Donovan (yellow card) 29'; Fortune 51', (yellow card) 90+2'; Kristo (yellow card) 87'	Report	Akinyode (red card) 33'; Brett (yellow card) 45'	Stadium: WakeMed Soccer Park; Attendance: 0 Referee: Kevin Broadley
Note: Played in empty stadium because of COVID-19 pandemic

August 8 4	Memphis 901 FC	0–1	North Carolina FC	Memphis, TN
5:00 PM EDT	Paul (yellow card) 65'	Report	Ward (yellow card) 15', (goal) 38'; Fortune (yellow card) 21'	Stadium: AutoZone Park; Attendance: 901; Referee: Matthew Thompson

August 15 5	North Carolina FC	0–2	Birmingham Legion FC	Cary, NC
8:30 PM EDT	Donovan (yellow card) 48'	Report	Servania 18'; Brett 21' (pen.); A. Crognale (yellow card) 42'; Akinyode (yellow card) 46'; Van Oekel (yellow card) 59'; Lopez (yellow card) 60'	Stadium: WakeMed Soccer Park; Attendance: 0 Referee: Matthew Franz
Note: Played in empty stadium because of COVID-19 pandemic

August 19 6	North Carolina FC	0–3	Charleston Battery	Cary, NC
7:00 PM EDT	Pecka (yellow card) 73'; Donovan (yellow card) 90'; Fortune (yellow card) 90+6'	Report	Kelly-Rosales (yellow card) 29'; Piggott 56'; Daley 69'; Zarokostas 81'	Stadium: WakeMed Soccer Park; Attendance: 0 Referee: John Griggs
Note: Played in empty stadium because of COVID-19 pandemic

August 26 7	Charlotte Independence	1–0	North Carolina FC	Matthews, NC
7:00 PM EDT	Ortiz 59'	Report	Ward (yellow card) 42'; Pecka (yellow card) 68'	Stadium: Sportsplex at Matthews; Attendance: 0 Referee: Kevin Broadley
Note: Played in empty stadium because of COVID-19 pandemic

August 29	North Carolina FC	v	Memphis 901 FC	Cary, NC
TBA PM EDT				Stadium: WakeMed Soccer Park
Note: Postponed as part of the protests over the shooting of Jacob Blake. Rescheduled for September 10.

September 2 8	Birmingham Legion FC	1–2	North Carolina FC	Birmingham, AL
7:00 PM CDT	Kobayashi (yellow card) 45+1'; Kasim 59'; Brett (penalty missed) 90'	Report	Albadawi 24'; Fortune 62' (pen.)	Stadium: BBVA Field; Referee: Lukasz Szpala

September 5 9	Charlotte Independence	3–1	North Carolina FC	Matthews, NC
7:00 PM EDT	Kelly 10', 20', (yellow card) 43', (goal) 79'; Lacroix (yellow card) 18'; Martínez (yellow card) 51'	Report	Smith (yellow card) 35'; Taylor (yellow card) 60'; Fortune 90+1'	Stadium: Sportsplex at Matthews; Referee: Jonathan Bilinski
Note: Played in empty stadium because of COVID-19 pandemic

September 10 10	North Carolina FC	2–3	Memphis 901 FC	Cary, NC
7:00 PM EDT	Pecka (yellow card) 45+1'; Fortune (yellow card) 64'; Kristo 86'; Taylor 90+1', (yellow card) 90+7'	Report	Mentzingen 30'; Baxter (yellow card) 36'; Paul (yellow card) 55'; Hundley 75', 90+8'; Jennings (yellow card) 89'	Stadium: WakeMed Soccer Park; Referee: John Matto
Note: Played in empty stadium because of COVID-19 pandemic

September 13 11	North Carolina FC	3–2	Memphis 901 FC	Cary, NC
6:00 PM EDT	Barry (yellow card) 29', (goal) 58'; Donovan 55'; Ward (yellow card) 65'; Albadawi 89'	Report	Jennings 24', 35'; Carroll (yellow card) 45+1'	Stadium: WakeMed Soccer Park; Referee: John Griggs
Note: Originally scheduled for September 12. Rescheduled to accommodate for rescheduling of previous game. Played in empty stadium because of COVID-19 pandemic.

September 19 12	North Carolina FC	0–1	Charlotte Independence	Cary, NC
7:00 PM EDT	Albadawi (yellow card) 45+1' (yellow-red card) 67'; Taylor (yellow card) 50'; Donovan (yellow card) 69'; Fortune (yellow card) 73'	Report	Kelly (red card) 44'; Miller (yellow card) 45+1'; Martínez (yellow card) 45+1'; Maund 51'; Lacroix (yellow card) 66'	Stadium: WakeMed Soccer Park; Referee: Matthew Franz

September 23	Memphis 901 FC	Canceled	North Carolina FC	Memphis, TN
7:00 PM CDT				Stadium: AutoZone Park
Note: Postponed after a member of the Memphis 901 FC organization tested positive for COVID-19. Game was not rescheduled after both teams were eliminated from playoff contention.

September 26 13	Birmingham Legion FC	1–2	North Carolina FC	Birmingham, AL
7:00 PM CDT	Cromwell (yellow card) 23'; Servania 67'; Williams (yellow card) 87'	Report	Perez 7', (yellow card) 37'; Fortune 26' (pen.); Kristo (yellow card) 90+6'	Stadium: BBVA Field; Referee: Jonathan Bilinski

September 30 14	New York Red Bulls II	0–3	North Carolina FC	Richmond, VA
5:00 PM EDT	Cummins (yellow card) 44'; Hot (yellow card) 88'; Toure (yellow card) 90+3'	Report	Fortune 12' (pen.), (yellow card) 28'; Speas 26'; Tolkin 45+3' (o.g.)	Stadium: City Stadium; Referee: Matthew Franz
Note: Neutral site game scheduled after both teams had upcoming games against Loudoun United FC canceled because of COVID-19 outbreak.

October 3 15	North Carolina FC	0–1	Charlotte Independence	Cary, NC
7:00 PM EDT		Report	Haakenson (yellow card) 45+1'; Kelly (yellow card) 88'; Gebhard (yellow card) 90+1'; Sabella 90+4', (yellow card) 90+5'	Stadium: WakeMed Soccer Park; Attendance: 432; Referee: John Griggs
Note: Rescheduled from September 30 to accommodate for newly scheduled match against New York Red Bulls II.

October 4	Loudoun United FC	Canceled	North Carolina FC	Leesburg, VA
11:00 AM EDT				Stadium: Segra Field
Note: Match cancelled due to multiple positive COVID-19 tests in Loudoun United FC organization and a lack of rescheduling windows.

=== U.S. Open Cup ===
As a USL Championship club, North Carolina FC was scheduled to enter the competition in the second round, which was to be played April 7–9. Pairings for that round were announced on January 29. The first three rounds of the tournament were postponed on March 13, 2020, amid the COVID-19 pandemic. On August 17, the tournament was canceled.

April 7 2nd round	North Carolina FC	v	North Carolina Fusion U23 or (South Carolina) SC United Bantams	Cary, NC
7:00 PM EDT				Stadium: WakeMed Soccer Park
Note: Canceled because of COVID-19 pandemic

== Squad statistics ==
Source: Match reports

=== Appearances and goals ===
No.	Pos	Nat	Player	Total		USL Championship Regular Season	
No.	Pos	Nat	Player	Apps	Goals	Apps	Goals
1	GK	(Greece) GRE	Alex Tambakis	14	0	14	0
2	MF	(United States) USA	Manny Perez	14	1	11+3	1
3	DF	(United States) USA	Caleb Duvernay	2	0	2	0
4	DF	(Canada) CAN	Alex Comsia	11	0	9+2	0
5	DF	(New Zealand) NZL	Sam Brotherton	11	0	10+1	0
7	MF	(Brazil) BRA	Pecka	14	0	13+1	0
8	MF	(Trinidad and Tobago) TRI	Dre Fortune	14	6	11+3	6
9	MF	(Netherlands) NED	Marios Lomis	12	0	8+4	0
10	MF	(Palestine) PLE	Nazmi Albadawi	12	2	8+4	2
11	FW	(Bosnia and Herzegovina) BIH	Robert Kristo	15	2	6+9	2
15	DF	(Senegal) SEN	Malick Mbaye	1	0	0+1	0
16	MF	(United States) USA	Graham Smith	14	0	7+7	0
17	MF	(United States) USA	Ben Speas	14	1	8+6	1
20	DF	(United States) USA	Conor Donovan	14	1	14	1
21	FW	(Italy) ITA	Daniele Proch	11	0	1+10	0
24	GK	(Brazil) BRA	Paulo Pita	1	0	1	0
27	DF	(United States) USA	D.J. Taylor	15	1	15	1
30	DF	(United States) USA	Akeem Ward	11	1	10+1	1
31	MF	(United States) USA	Steven Miller	11	0	6+5	0
92	FW	(Guinea) GUI	Hadji Barry	15	1	11+4	1

=== Goal scorers ===
Place	Position	Nation	Number	Name	USL Championship Regular Season	Total
1	MF	(Trinidad and Tobago)	8	Dre Fortune	6	6
2	FW	(Bosnia and Herzegovina)	11	Robert Kristo	2	2
2	MF	(Palestine)	10	Nazmi Albadawi	2	2
4	MF	(United States)	2	Manny Perez	1	1
4	MF	(United States)	17	Ben Speas	1	1
4	DF	(United States)	20	Conor Donovan	1	1
4	DF	(United States)	27	D. J. Taylor	1	1
4	DF	(United States)	30	Akeem Ward	1	1
4	FW	(Guinea)	92	Hadji Barry	1	1
Own goals by opponent					1	1
TOTALS					17	17

=== Disciplinary record ===
Number	Nation	Position	Name	USL Championship Regular Season		Total	
Number	Nation	Position	Name	Booked	Sent off (straight red)	Booked	Sent off (straight red)
8	(Trinidad and Tobago)	MF	Dre Fortune	6	0	6	0
20	(United States)	DF	Conor Donovan	4	0	4	0
27	(United States)	DF	D.J. Taylor	4	0	4	0
7	(Brazil)	MF	Pecka	3	0	3	0
11	(Bosnia and Herzegovina)	FW	Robert Kristo	3	0	3	0
30	(United States)	DF	Akeem Ward	3	0	3	0
10	(Palestine)	MF	Nazmi Albadawi	2	1	2	1
2	(United States)	MF	Manny Perez	1	0	1	0
16	(United States)	MF	Graham Smith	1	0	1	0
92	(Guinea)	FW	Hadji Barry	1	0	1	0
TOTALS				26	1	26	1
