= D. J. Taylor =

D. J. Taylor may refer to:

- D. J. Taylor (writer) (born 1960), British critic, novelist, and biographer
- D. J. Taylor (soccer) (born 1997), American soccer player
