= 2020 Las Vegas Lights FC season =

Las Vegas Lights FC
2020 season
- General manager: Brett Lashbrook
- Head coach: Eric Wynalda (until June 17, 2020) Frank Yallop (June 29-present)
- Stadium: Cashman Field
- USL: Group B: 5th Western Conf.: 15th
- USL Cup Playoffs: Did not qualify
- U.S. Open Cup: Cancelled
- Silver State Cup: Runner-Up
- Top goalscorer: League: Yamikani Chester; All: Yamikani Chester
- Biggest win: LV 3–1 TAC (August 19); LV 3–1 OC (August 25)
- Biggest defeat: PHX 5–1 LV (September 11)
Home colors	Away colors

The 2020 Las Vegas Lights FC season was the club's third season, and their third season in the United Soccer League Championship (USLC), the second division of American soccer. This article covers the period from November 18, 2019, the day after the 2019 USLC Playoff Final, to the conclusion of the 2020 USLC Playoff Final, scheduled for November 12–16, 2020.

== Summary ==
The Las Vegas Lights played their first match of the USL Season against USL expansion side San Diego Loyal, who were making their USL debut. The Las Vegas Lights opened the scoring when Junior Burgos scored a fantastic 40-yard effort in off the crossbar, the USL Goal of the Week and a possible USL Goal of the Year contender. San Diego Loyal soon equalized in the 15th minute when a Charles Adams shot took a deflection of a Las Vegas defender and went in past Delgado.

After the season was delayed by the COVID-19 pandemic, the Lights had poor losing performances in a 2–1 loss to San Diego Loyal and 1–0 loss to in-state rivals Reno 1868 FC. Because of positive COVID-19 cases, matches against San Diego Loyal and Tacoma Defiance were delayed. The club lost 1-0 again to Orange County SC, with both goalies making important saves. Las Vegas finally won their first match of the season against Tacoma Defiance, 3–1. Burgos opened the scoring through a far shot that deflected of Taylor Mueller in the 19th minute. The Lights then doubled their lead after a center by Yamikani Chester was tapped in by Rashawn Dally. Later in the match, Junior Sandoval scored after being assisted by Blake Frischknecht. In the 84th minute, Azriel Gonzalez got a goal back that squeezed through Lights keeper Thomas Olsen.

The club continued their run of form with a 3–3 draw against first place in Group B Phoenix Rising FC. Phoenix scored early through a shot by Rufat Dadashov, assisted by Solomon Asante. Lights keeper Edward Delgado made several decisive saves against Junior Flemmings, but Flemmings scored in the 68th minute from a lob. The Las Vegas Lights got a goal back from Chester, and soon after Junior Burgos hit the crossbar from a free kick. In the 90th minute Solomon Asante converted a penalty. The Las Vegas Lights then scored in stoppage time as a header by Chester hit of A. J. Cochran for an own goal. The club then equalized after a deflected free kick came to Ramon Martin Del Campo.

After the Phoenix draw, Vegas went down 1–0 to Orange County after a penalty converted by Aodhan Quinn. Las Vegas soon equalized after Del Campo scored from a corner. Substitute Frischknecht then scored a low shot assisted by Dally, before Junior Sandoval added gloss to the win in stoppage-time, making it 3–1. The Las Vegas Lights then lost a closely contested 4-3 thriller against LA Galaxy II, with lights player Raul Mendiola hitting the post in stoppage time. After a 1–1 draw with San Diego loyal (in which Blake Frischknecht scored his 4th goal or assist in 3 games) the club lost 2–0 to Phoenix Rising at home. In the away match, they lost 5–1, their worst result of their season to date. The Lights then lost a 2-goal lead against LA Galaxy II and ended up losing 3–2, with Augustine Williams netting a late penalty.

Las Vegas were eliminated from the play-offs after a 1–0 loss to Orange County SC, in which Mobi Fehr and Seth Moses being sent off. After San Diego Loyal beat Phoenix Rising 3–2, the lights could not finish above fifth. Vegas then had a 2–2 draw with La Galaxy II. Sandoval scored after collecting a long ball from Jordan Murrell. LA Galaxy turned the game around with two quick goals in the 71st and 81st minute. In stoppage-time, Dally equalized after some good dribbling by José Carrera García. Las Vegas then played rivals Reno 1868. The lights took the lead early through Junior Burgos but soon Reno equalized from Foster Langsdorf. The lights scored again from Yamikani Chester but Reno equalized soon after again from Kevin Partida. The score finished 2-2 and Reno won the Silver State Cup. The lights lost the final match of the season 4–2 to Orange County. Fans were permitted for the match, at limited capacity.

== Squad ==
As of September 28, 2020

No.	Position	Nation	Player
0	GK	USA	Edward Delgado
1	GK	USA	Thomas Olsen
2	DF	MEX	Ramon Martin Del Campo
3	DF	ENG	Johnny Fenwick
4	DF	USA	Gabe Robinson
5	DF	USA	Javan Torre
6	MF	USA	Mobi Fehr
7	MF	HON	Junior Sandoval
8	MF	MEX	José Carrera
9	FW	USA	Blake Frischknecht
10	MF	SLV	Junior Burgos
11	FW	MWI	Yamikani Chester
12	DF	CAN	Jordan Murrell
14	MF	USA	Bryan de la Fuente
15	MF	USA	Grant Robinson
17	DF	USA	Jaiden Waggoner
20	DF	NZL	Noah Billingsley (on loan from Minnesota United FC)
22	FW	LBR	Seku Conneh
23	MF	USA	Alex Culwell
25	FW	USA	Quincy Amarikwa
29	FW	COL	Santiago Echavarría
32	MF	MEX	Jonathan Levin
36	MF	USA	Seth Moses
40	FW	MEX	Raúl Mendiola
58	GK	USA	Angel Alvarez
66	DF	BDI	Chancel Ndaye
81	FW	JAM	Rashawn Dally (on loan from FC Cincinnati)

== Competitions ==
=== Exhibitions ===
February 8 Preseason 1	Real Salt Lake	v	Las Vegas Lights FC	Herriman, Utah
PST
Note: Result not made public.

February 19 Preseason 2	LA Galaxy II	v	Las Vegas Lights FC	Carson, California
PM PST				Stadium: Dignity Health Sports Park

February 28 Preseason 3	Orange County SC	v	Las Vegas Lights FC	Irvine, California
7:00 PM PST				Stadium: Orange County Great Park

=== USL Championship ===
==== Standings — Group B ====
Pos	Team	Pld	W	D	L	GF	GA	GD	Pts	PPG	Qualification
1	Phoenix Rising FC	16	11	2	3	46	17	+29	35	2.19	Advance to USL Championship Playoffs
2	LA Galaxy II	16	8	2	6	29	32	−3	26	1.63	Advance to USL Championship Playoffs
3	Orange County SC	16	7	3	6	18	18	0	24	1.50	
4	San Diego Loyal SC	16	6	5	5	17	18	−1	23	1.44	
5	Las Vegas Lights FC	16	2	5	9	24	34	−10	11	0.69	

Source: USL

==== Match results ====
On December 20, 2019, the USL announced the 2020 season schedule, creating the following fixture list for the early part of Las Vegas' season.

March 7 1	San Diego Loyal SC	1–1	Las Vegas Lights FC	San Diego, California
7:00 PM PST	Adams 15'; Stoneman (yellow card) 90+3'	Report	Burgos 4'; Sandoval (yellow card) 29'; Torre (yellow card) 55'	Stadium: Torero Stadium; Attendance: 6,100; Referee: Elton Garcia

In the preparations for the resumption of league play following the shutdown prompted by the COVID-19 pandemic, the remainder of Las Vegas' schedule was announced on July 2.

July 25 2	San Diego Loyal SC	2–1	Las Vegas Lights FC	San Diego, California
7:00 PM PST	Moshobane 9'; Adams (yellow card) 54'; Parra 65'; Kempin (yellow card) 81'	Report	Sandoval (yellow card) 17'; Dally 45+6'; Fenwick (yellow card) 84'	Stadium: Torero Stadium; Referee: Joseph Salinas

August 1 3	Las Vegas Lights FC	0–1	Reno 1868 FC	Las Vegas, Nevada
7:30 PM PDT	Mendiola (yellow card) 81'	Report	Richards 18'	Stadium: Cashman Field; Referee: Michael Radchuk

August 8 4	Las Vegas Lights FC	P–P	San Diego Loyal SC	Las Vegas, Nevada
TBA PM PDT				Stadium: Cashman Field

August 12 5	Las Vegas Lights FC	P–P	Tacoma Defiance	Las Vegas, Nevada
TBA PM PDT				Stadium: Cashman Field
Note: Match postponed due to positive covid-19 test result with the Las Vegas Lights organization.

August 15 6	Orange County SC	1–0	Las Vegas Lights FC	Irvine, California
7:00 PM PDT	Quinn 69'; Okoli (yellow card) 89'	Report	Moses (yellow card) 9'; Waggoner (yellow card) 45' del Campo (yellow card) 74'	Stadium: Championship Soccer Stadium; Referee: Michael Radchuk

August 19 5	Las Vegas Lights FC	3–1	Tacoma Defiance	Las Vegas, Nevada
7:30 PM PDT	Burgos 19'; Dally 30'; Sandoval 67'	Report	Cissoko (yellow card) 68'; Gonzalez 84'	Stadium: Cashman Field; Referee: Karen Callado
Note: Reschedule of postponed August 12th match.

August 22 7	Las Vegas Lights FC	3–3	Phoenix Rising FC	Las Vegas, Nevada
8:30 PM PDT	Chester 80'; Moses (yellow card) 84'; Cochran 90+6' (o.g.) del Campo 90+9'	Report	Dadashov 4'; King (yellow card) 22'; Kontoh (yellow card) 59'; Flemmings 68'; Stanton (yellow card) 74'; Asante 90' (pen.)	Stadium: Cashman Field; Referee: Malik Badawi

August 25 8	Las Vegas Lights FC	3–1	Orange County SC	Las Vegas, Nevada
7:00 PM PDT	del Campo 18'; Gr. Robinson (yellow card) 52'; Fenwick (yellow card) 62'; Burgos (penalty missed) 68'; Frischknecht 84'; Sandoval 90+2'	Report	Quinn 12' (pen.); Alston (yellow card) 60'	Stadium: Cashman Field; Referee: Brandon Stevis

August 30 9	LA Galaxy II	4–3	Las Vegas Lights FC	Carson, California
2:00 PM PDT	Cuevas 5'; Williams 53'; Gutiérrez 62'; Hernandez 74'	Report	Chester 14'; Gr. Robinson (yellow card) 27'; Torre (yellow card) 64'; Fenwick 73'; Frischknecht 87'	Stadium: Dignity Health Sports Park; Referee: Ricardo Fierro

September 2 4	Las Vegas Lights FC	1–1	San Diego Loyal SC	Las Vegas, Nevada
7:30 PM PDT	Billingsley (yellow card) 69'; Frischknecht 73'; Torre (yellow card) 90+5'	Report	C. Martin (yellow card) 53', (goal) 57'; Stoneman (yellow card) 72'	Stadium: Cashman Field; Referee: Jonathan Bilinski

September 5 10	Las Vegas Lights FC	0–2	Phoenix Rising FC	Las Vegas, Nevada
6:30 PM PDT	Fehr (yellow card) 45+1'; Sandoval (yellow card) 50' de la Fuente (yellow card) 52'; Amarikwa (yellow card) 90'	Report	King (yellow card) 14'; Olsen 53' (o.g.); Cochran (yellow card) 73'; Bakero (yellow card) 74'; Dadashov 90+4'	Stadium: Cashman Field; Referee: William Hoffman

September 11 11	Phoenix Rising FC	5–1	Las Vegas Lights FC	Scottsdale, Arizona
7:30 PM PDT	Dadashov 27', 44'; Flemmings 55'; Stanton 57'; Bakero 72' (pen.); Farrell (yellow card) 90+2'	Report	Moses (yellow card) 41'; Fenwick (yellow card) 71' de la Fuente 82'	Stadium: Casino Arizona Field; Referee: Isaiah Vlad

September 15 12	LA Galaxy II	3–2	Las Vegas Lights FC	Carson, California
7:00 PM PDT	Williams 37', 84' (pen.); Perez 62'; Nava (yellow card) 65'	Report	Moses 22'; Chester 28'; Delgado (yellow card) 83'	Stadium: Dignity Health Sports Park; Referee: Brandon Stevis

September 18 13	Orange County SC	1–0	Las Vegas Lights FC	Irvine, California
7:00 PM PDT	Orozco (yellow card) 43'; Jones 63'; Okoli (yellow card) 64'; Quinn (yellow card) 69'; Smith (yellow card) 81'	Report	Fehr (red card) 29'; Moses (yellow card) 46' (yellow-red card) 59'; Torre (yellow card) 54'; Burgos (yellow card) 67'	Stadium: Championship Soccer Stadium; Referee: Omeed Azadpour

September 26 14	Las Vegas Lights FC	2–2	LA Galaxy II	Las Vegas, Nevada
7:30 PM PDT	Sandoval 39'; Levin (yellow card) 74'; Burgos (yellow card) 88'; Dally 90+3'	Report	Cuevas (yellow card) 55'; Williams 71'; Perez 81'	Stadium: Cashman Field; Referee: Brad Jensen

September 30 15	Reno 1868 FC	2–2	Las Vegas Lights FC	Reno, Nevada
8:00 PM PDT	Alfaro (yellow card) 8'; Langsdorf 12'; Hertzog (penalty missed) 19'; Partida 28' (pen.); Apodaca (yellow card) 81'	Report	Burgos 9'; Chester 25'; Moses (yellow card) 57'; Fehr (yellow card) 70'; Robertson (yellow card) 74'; Fenwick (yellow card) 90+5'	Stadium: Greater Nevada Field

October 3 16	Las Vegas Lights FC	2–4	Orange County SC	Las Vegas, Nevada
7:30 PM PDT	Mendiola 24', 66'; Fehr (yellow card) 30'; Sandoval (yellow card) 73'; Murrell (red card) 90+3'	Report	Hoffman 17', 21', 27'; Henry (yellow card) 37'; Casiple (yellow card) 68' (yellow-red card) 76'; Quinn 90+2' (pen.)	Stadium: Cashman Field; Attendance: 250; Referee: Alejandro Mariscal

=== U.S. Open Cup ===
As a USL Championship club, Las Vegas will enter the competition in the Second Round, to be played April 7–9.

April 9 2nd round	Las Vegas Lights FC (Nevada)	Cancelled	(California) Cal FC or (California) Ventura County Fusion	Las Vegas, Nevada
7:30 PM PDT		Report		Stadium: Cashman Field
Note: Match cancelled due to the COVID-19 pandemic
