= 2020 Minnesota United FC season =

Minnesota United FC
2020 season
- Owner: Bill McGuire
- CEO: Chris Wright
- Head coach: Adrian Heath
- Stadium: Allianz Field
- Western Conference: 4th
- Overall: 9th
- MLS Cup Playoffs: Conference Finals
- U.S. Open Cup: Canceled
- Leagues Cup: Canceled
- MLS is Back Tournament: Semi-finals
- Top goalscorer: League: Kevin Molino (9); All: Kevin Molino (13)
- Biggest win: 4–0 RSL (Sept. 6)
- Biggest defeat: HOU 3–0 (Sept. 2)
Home colors	Away colors

The 2020 Minnesota United FC season was the eleventh season of Minnesota United FC's existence and their fourth season in Major League Soccer, the top-tier of American soccer. United plays at Allianz Field and is coached by Adrian Heath. Outside of MLS, Minnesota United were also scheduled to participate in the 2020 U.S. Open Cup and the 2020 Leagues Cup, before their cancelations due to the COVID-19 pandemic, as well as various preseason competitions.

== Club ==
As of February 17, 2020

No.	Name	Nationality	Position	Date of birth (age)	Signed from
Goalkeepers
1	Tyler Miller	(United States)	GK	12 March 1993 (age 33)	(United States) Los Angeles FC
18	Greg Ranjitsingh	(Canada)	GK	18 July 1993 (age 33)	(United States) Orlando City SC
30	Adrian Zendejas	(United States)	GK	30 August 1995 (age 31)	(United States) Nashville SC
97	Dayne St. Clair	(Canada)	GK	9 May 1997 (age 29)	(United States) Maryland Terrapins
99	Fred Emmings (HGP)	(Luxembourg)	GK	8 February 2004 (age 22)	(United States) MNUFC Academy
Defenders
2	Noah Billingsley	(New Zealand)	DF	6 August 1997 (age 29)	(United States) UC Santa Barbara
3	Ike Opara	(United States)	DF	21 February 1989 (age 37)	(United States) Sporting Kansas City
4	José Aja	(Uruguay)	DF	10 May 1993 (age 33)	(Chile) Union Española
14	Brent Kallman	(United States)	DF	4 October 1990 (age 35)	(United States) Minnesota United FC (NASL)
15	Michael Boxall	(New Zealand)	DF	18 August 1988 (age 38)	(South Africa) SuperSport United
19	Romain Métanire	(Madagascar)	DF	28 March 1990 (age 36)	(France) Stade Reims
21	Bakaye Dibassy	(Mali)	DF	11 August 1989 (age 37)	(France) Amiens SC
41	James Musa	(New Zealand)	DF	1 April 1992 (age 34)	(United States) Phoenix Rising FC
77	Chase Gasper	(United States)	DF	25 January 1996 (age 30)	(United States) University of Maryland
Midfielder
5	Jacori Hayes	(United States)	MF	28 June 1995 (age 31)	(United States) FC Dallas
6	Osvaldo Alonso	(Cuba)	MF	11 November 1985 (age 40)	(United States) Seattle Sounders FC
7	Kevin Molino	(Trinidad and Tobago)	MF	17 June 1990 (age 36)	(United States) Orlando City SC
8	Ján Greguš (DP)	(Slovakia)	MF	29 January 1991 (age 35)	(Denmark) F.C. Copenhagen
10	Emanuel Reynoso (DP)	(Argentina)	MF	16 November 1995 (age 30)	(Argentina) Boca Juniors
11	Thomás Chacón (DP)	(Uruguay)	MF	17 August 2000 (age 26)	(Uruguay) Danubio F.C.
13	Ethan Finlay	(United States)	MF	6 August 1990 (age 36)	(United States) Columbus Crew
17	Robin Lod	(Finland)	MF	17 April 1993 (age 33)	(Spain) Sporting Gijón
20	Sam Gleadle	(England)	MF	20 March 1996 (age 30)	(United States) Reno 1868 FC
31	Hassani Dotson	(United States)	MF	6 August 1997 (age 29)	(United States) Oregon State University
44	Raheem Edwards	(Canada)	MF	17 July 1995 (age 31)	(United States) Chicago Fire
89	Kevin Partida	(United States)	MF	10 March 1995 (age 31)	(United States) Reno 1868 FC
94	Marlon Hairston	(United States)	MF	23 March 1994 (age 32)	(United States) Houston Dynamo
Forwards
9	Luis Amarilla	(Paraguay)	FW	25 August 1995 (age 31)	(Argentina) Vélez Sarsfield
12	Aaron Schoenfeld	(United States)	FW	17 April 1990 (age 36)	(Israel) Maccabi Tel Aviv
16	Kei Kamara	(Sierra Leone)	FW	1 September 1984 (age 42)	(United States) Colorado Rapids
27	Foster Langsdorf	(United States)	FW	14 December 1995 (age 30)	(United States) Reno 1868 FC

== Transfers ==
=== Transfers in ===
Date	Position	No.	Player	From club	Notes	Ref.
November 13, 2019	MF	94	(United States) Marlon Hairston	(United States) Houston Dynamo	Trade	
November 25, 2019	GK	18	(Canada) Greg Ranjitsingh	(United States) Orlando City SC	2019 MLS Waiver Draft	
January 16, 2020	GK	1	(United States) Tyler Miller	(United States) Los Angeles FC	Trade	
January 17, 2020	MF	41	(New Zealand) James Musa	(United States) Phoenix Rising FC	Transfer	
January 21, 2020	MF	5	(United States) Jacori Hayes	(United States) FC Dallas	Trade	
January 22, 2020	GK	99	(Luxembourg) Fred Emmings	(United States) MNUFC Academy	Signed as a Homegrown Player (HGP)	
February 11, 2020	MF	44	(Canada) Raheem Edwards	(United States) Chicago Fire	Trade	
February 12, 2020	FW	12	(United States) Aaron Schoenfeld	(Israel) Maccabi Tel Aviv	Transfer	
February 14, 2020	DF	4	(Uruguay) José Aja	(Chile) Union Española	Transfer	
August 3, 2020	DF	21	(Mali) Bakaye Dibassy	(France) Amiens SC	Transfer	
September 1, 2020	MF	10	(Argentina) Emanuel Reynoso	(Argentina) Boca Juniors	Transfer	
September 17, 2020	GK	30	(United States) Adrian Zendejas	(United States) Nashville SC	Trade	
September 19, 2020	FW	16	(Sierra Leone) Kei Kamara	(United States) Colorado Rapids	Trade	
October 30, 2020	MF	20	(England) Sam Gleadle	(United States) Reno 1868 FC	Transfer	
October 30, 2020	FW	27	(United States) Foster Langsdorf	(United States) Reno 1868 FC	Transfer	
October 30, 2020	MF	89	(United States) Kevin Partida	(United States) Reno 1868 FC	Transfer	

=== MLS SuperDraft ===
Round	Pick	Player	Position	Previous club	Status	Ref
1	18	(New Zealand) Noah Billingsley	Defender	UC Santa Barbara	Signed	
4	88	(England) Matthew Bentley	Forward	Missouri State University	Unsigned	
4	96	(United States) Andrew Booth	Midfielder	FIU	Unsigned	

1. Acquired from Chicago Fire along with $50,000 in 2020 General Allocation Money in exchange for $50,000 in 2019 General Allocation Money

=== Transfers out ===
Date	Position	No.	Player	To club	Notes	Ref.
October 25, 2019	DF	2	(United States) Carter Manley	(United States) Rio Grande Valley FC Toros	Option declined	
October 25, 2019	MF	17	(United States) Collin Martin	(United States) San Diego Loyal SC	Option declined	
October 25, 2019	MF	20	(Finland) Rasmus Schüller	(Finland) HJK	Option declined	
October 25, 2019	MF	86	(France) Wilfried Moimbé	Free agent	Option declined	
October 25, 2019	MF		(Tanzania) Ally Hamis Ng'anzi	(United States) Loudoun United FC	Option declined	
November 13, 2019	MF	25	(Colombia) Darwin Quintero	(United States) Houston Dynamo	Traded	
November 19, 2019	FW	99	(Ghana) Abu Danladi	(United States) Nashville SC	Selected in Expansion Draft	
November 21, 2019	MF	10	(United States) Miguel Ibarra	(United States) Seattle Sounders FC	Option declined	
November 21, 2019	MF	12	(Kenya) Lawrence Olum	(United States) Miami FC	Option declined	
January 1, 2020	GK	1	(Italy) Vito Mannone	(England) Reading	End of loan	
January 21, 2020	FW	9	(Colombia) Ángelo Rodríguez	(Colombia) Deportivo Cali	Contract buyout	
February 11, 2020	DF	22	(United States) Wyatt Omsberg	(United States) Chicago Fire	Traded	
July 1, 2020	MF		(Ecuador) Romario Ibarra	(Mexico) Pachuca	Transfer	
October 1, 2020	FW	23	(United States) Mason Toye	(Canada) Montreal Impact	Trade	

=== Loans in ===
Start date	End date	Position	No.	Player	From club	Ref.
January 28, 2020	End of season	FW	9	(Paraguay) Luis Amarilla	(Argentina) Vélez Sarsfield	

=== Loans out ===
Start date	End date	Position	No.	Player	To club	Ref.
May 21, 2019	June 2020	MF		(Ecuador) Romario Ibarra	(Mexico) Pachuca	
February 12, 2020	August 19, 2020	GK	97	(Canada) Dayne St. Clair	(United States) San Antonio FC	
August 14, 2020	September 17, 2020	DF	14	(United States) Brent Kallman	(United States) El Paso Locomotive FC	

== Competitions ==
Win Draw Loss

=== Overview ===
Competition	Record							
Competition	G	W	D	L	GF	GA	GD	Win %
MLS	5	3	2	0	12	6	+6	60.00
MLS is Back Tournament	6	2	3	1	10	8	+2	33.33
Total	11	5	5	1	22	14	+8	45.45

Updated to match played August 6, 2020
Source: Competitions

=== Exhibitions ===
==== Preseason ====
February 1 1	FIU Panthers	0–5	Minnesota United FC	Melbourne, Florida
CST		Report	Toye, Molino; Hairston; Booth	Stadium: Titan Soccer Complex

February 5 2	Charleston Battery	2–3	Minnesota United FC	Melbourne, Florida
4:30 p.m. CST	Lewis 5', 19'	Report; Report	Dotson 9'; Lod 25'; Chacón	Stadium: Titan Soccer Complex

February 8 3	Miami FC	0–5	Minnesota United FC	Melbourne, Florida
2:30 p.m. CST		Report	Amarilla 11'; Greguš 24'; Booth; Toye 84',	Stadium: Titan Soccer Complex

==== Portland Tournament ====
===== Standings =====
Pos	Team	GP	W	L	D	GF	GA	GD	Pts
1	Vancouver Whitecaps FC	3	2	1	0	5	3	+2	6
2	Minnesota United FC	3	1	1	1	7	6	+1	4
3	New England Revolution	3	1	1	1	5	5	0	4
4	Portland Timbers	3	1	0	2	5	8	–3	3

Last updated: February 23, 2020.

February 16 1	New England Revolution	2–2	Minnesota United FC	Portland, Oregon
4:30 p.m. CST	Buksa 28' (Penilla); Bou 71'	Report	Amarilla 23' (Molino), 35' (pen.)	Stadium: Providence Park

February 19 2	Portland Timbers	2–4	Minnesota United FC	Portland, Oregon
9:30 p.m. CST	Asprilla 29'; Krolicki 85'	Report	Edwards 35', 54'; Chacón 63'; Amarilla 74'	Stadium: Providence Park

February 22 3	Vancouver Whitecaps FC	2–1	Minnesota United FC	Portland, Oregon
4:30 p.m. CST	Cavallini 64'; Montero 90'	Report	Finlay 7'	Stadium: Providence Park

=== Major League Soccer ===
==== Standings ====
===== Western Conference =====
Pos	Team	Pld	W	L	T	GF	GA	GD	Pts	PPG	Qualification
2	Seattle Sounders FC	22	11	5	6	44	23	+21	39	1.77	Qualification for the playoffs first round and Leagues Cup
3	Portland Timbers	23	11	6	6	46	35	+11	39	1.70	Qualification for the playoffs first round and 2021 CONCACAF Champions League (Note: As MLS is Back Tournament winners)
4	Minnesota United FC	21	9	5	7	36	26	+10	34	1.62	Qualification for the playoffs first round
5	Colorado Rapids	18	8	6	4	32	28	+4	28	1.56	Qualification for the playoffs first round
6	FC Dallas	22	9	6	7	28	24	+4	34	1.55	Qualification for the playoffs first round

Source: MLS
Rules for classification: 1) points per game; 2) total wins per match played; 3) total goal differential per match played; 4) total goals scored per match played; 5) fewest disciplinary points per match played; 6) away goal differential per away match played; 7) away goals scored per away match played; 8) home goal differential per home match played; 9) home goals scored per home match played; 10) coin toss or drawing of lots.

===== MLS is Back Tournament – Group D =====
Group D results
Pos	Team	Pld	W	D	L	GF	GA	GD	Pts	Qualification
1	Sporting Kansas City	3	2	0	1	6	4	+2	6	Advanced to knockout stage
2	Minnesota United FC	3	1	2	0	4	3	+1	5	Advanced to knockout stage
3	Real Salt Lake	3	1	1	1	2	2	0	4	Advanced to knockout stage
4	Colorado Rapids	3	0	1	2	4	7	−3	1	

Source: MLS

===== Overall =====
2020 MLS overall standings
Pos	Team	Pld	W	L	T	GF	GA	GD	Pts	PPG	Qualification
7	New York City FC	23	12	8	3	37	25	+12	39	1.70	2021 Leagues Cup (Note: As 5th, Eastern Conference (MLS4))
8	Portland Timbers (M)	23	11	6	6	46	35	+11	39	1.70	2021 CONCACAF Champions League (Note: As MLS is Back Tournament winners (USA3))
9	Minnesota United FC	21	9	5	7	36	26	+10	34	1.62	
10	Colorado Rapids	18	8	6	4	32	28	+4	28	1.56	
11	FC Dallas	22	9	6	7	28	24	+4	34	1.55	

Source: MLS
Rules for classification: 1) points per game; 2) total wins per match played; 3) total goal differential per match played; 4) total goals scored per match played; 5) fewest disciplinary points per match played; 6) away goal differential per away match played; 7) away goals scored per away match played; 8) home goal differential per home match played; 9) home goals scored per home match played; 10) coin toss or drawing of lots.
(M) MLS is Back Tournament champions

==== Results ====
All times are Central.

March 1 Match 1	Portland Timbers	1–3	Minnesota United FC	Portland, Oregon
6:30 p.m. CST	Paredes (yellow card) 43'; Valeri 56' (pen.), (yellow card) 61'; Chará (yellow card) 71'	Report	Alonso (yellow card) 31'; Métanire (yellow card) 38'; Molino 51', 78'; Amarilla 76'	Stadium: Providence Park; Attendance: 25,218; Referee: Ismail Elfath

March 7 Match 2	San Jose Earthquakes	2–5	Minnesota United FC	San Jose, California
7:00 p.m. CST	Eriksson 19' (pen.); Qazaishvili 53'	Report	Opara 13', 71'; Gregus 26'; Amarilla 32', (yellow card) 67'; Lod 45+3'	Stadium: Avaya Stadium; Attendance: 12,223; Referee: Baldomero Toledo

July 12 Match 3 MLSiBT Group stage	Sporting Kansas City	1–2	Minnesota United FC	Bay Lake, Florida
7:00 p.m. CDT	Shelton 43'; Melia (red card) 74'; Espinoza (yellow card) 83'; Ilie (yellow card) 90+1'	Report	Gasper (yellow card) 34'; Aja (yellow card) 60'; Greguš (yellow card) 70'; Shelton 90+2' (o.g.); Molino 90+7'	Stadium: ESPN Wide World of Sports Complex; Attendance: 0 Referee: Joseph Dickerson
Note: Match postponed due to the COVID-19 pandemic

July 17 Match 4 MLSiBT Group stage	Real Salt Lake	0–0	Minnesota United FC	Bay Lake, Florida
9:30 p.m. CDT	Herrera (yellow card) 43'; Meram (yellow card) 45+2'; Baird (yellow card) 69'	Report	Chacón (yellow card) 53'; Lod (yellow card) 66'	Stadium: ESPN Wide World of Sports Complex; Attendance: 0 Referee: Alex Chilowicz
Note: Match postponed due to the COVID-19 pandemic

July 22 Match 5 MLSiBT Group stage	Colorado Rapids	2–2	Minnesota United FC	Bay Lake, Florida
9:30 p.m. CDT	Kamara 19'; Moor (yellow card) 52'; Lewis 59'; Acosta (yellow card) 71'; Abubakar (yellow card) 85'	Report	Amarilla (yellow card) 12'; Dotson (yellow card) 15'; Finlay 36', 43'; Lod (yellow card) 58'; Alonso (yellow card) 85'; Aja (yellow card) 90+3'	Stadium: ESPN Wide World of Sports Complex; Attendance: 0 Referee: Guido Gonzales, Jr.
Note: Match postponed due to the COVID-19 pandemic

July 28 MLSiBT Round of 16	Columbus Crew SC	1–1 (3–5 p)	Minnesota United FC	Bay Lake, Florida
7:00 p.m. CDT	Zardes 79'; Mensah (yellow card) 84'	Report	Lod 18'	Stadium: ESPN Wide World of Sports Complex; Attendance: 0 Referee: Allen Chapman
	Penalties
	Adi (penalty scored); Santos (penalty scored); Cadden (penalty missed); Zelarayán (penalty scored)		(penalty scored) Alonso; (penalty scored) Greguš; (penalty scored) Schoenfeld; (penalty scored) Edwards; (penalty scored) Gasper

August 1 MLSiBT Quarter-finals	San Jose Earthquakes	1–4	Minnesota United FC	Bay Lake, Florida
7:00 p.m. CDT	Judson (yellow card) 41'; Eriksson 50' (pen.); Ríos (yellow card) 64'; Yueill (yellow card) 85'; Wondolowski (yellow card) 88'	Report	Lod 20'; Hayes 21'; Amarilla 56'; Hairston 86'	Stadium: ESPN Wide World of Sports Complex; Attendance: 0 Referee: Jair Marrufo

August 6 MLSiBT Semi-finals	Orlando City SC	3–1	Minnesota United FC	Bay Lake, Florida
7:00 p.m. CDT	Nani 36', 42'; Michel 90+6'	Report	Toye 83'	Stadium: ESPN Wide World of Sports Complex; Attendance: 0 Referee: Marcos de Oliveira

August 21 Match 6	Minnesota United FC	1–2	Sporting Kansas City	Saint Paul, Minnesota
6:30 p.m. CDT	Aja (yellow card) 24'; Lindsey 32' (o.g.); Alonso (yellow card) 90+3'	Report	Kinda 12'; Busio (yellow card) 46'; Boxall 55' (o.g.); Pulido (yellow card) 77'; Duke (yellow card) 90+5'	Stadium: Allianz Field; Attendance: 0 Referee: Ramy Touchan

August 29 Match 7	FC Dallas	3–1	Minnesota United FC	Frisco, Texas
7:30PM CDT (UTC-05)	Picault 11'; Ferreira 12' (yellow card) 48'; Ziegler 90+6' (pen.)	Report	Gasper (yellow card) 50'; Dotson 55'; Métanire (yellow card) 57'; Boxall (yellow card) 81'	Stadium: Toyota Stadium; Attendance: 3,212; Referee: Joseph Dickerson

September 2 Match 8	Houston Dynamo	3–0	Minnesota United FC	Houston, Texas
7:00 PM CDT	Quintero 28'; Lassiter 65', 70'; Struna (yellow card) 78'; Zahibo (yellow card) 90'	Report	Boxall (yellow card) 84'	Stadium: BBVA Compass Stadium; Attendance: 1,000; Referee: Allen Chapman

September 6 Match 9	Minnesota United FC	4–0	Real Salt Lake	St. Paul, Minnesota
6:00pm MDT	Gasper 53'; Reynoso (yellow card) 56'; Lod 62', 90'; Hayes 75'	Report	Beckerman (yellow card) 73'	Stadium: Allianz Field; Attendance: 0 Referee: Marcos de Oliveira

September 9 Match 10	Minnesota United FC	3–2	FC Dallas	Saint Paul, Minnesota
6:00pm MDT	Toye 11'; Molino 28', 70' (pen.); Gasper (yellow card) 47'; Boxall (yellow card) 56'; Aja (yellow card) 80'; Métanire (red card) 82'	Report	Pepi 42'; Mosquera 77'	Stadium: Allianz Field; Attendance: 0 Referee: Alex Chilowicz

September 13 Match 11	Sporting Kansas City	1–0	Minnesota United FC	Kansas City, Kansas
7:30PM CDT	Russell 80'; Busio (yellow card) 84'; Punčec (yellow card) 87'; Gerso (yellow card) 90+3'	Report	Dotson (yellow card) 90+2'	Stadium: Children's Mercy Park; Attendance: 3,400; Referee: Kevin Stott

September 19 Match 12	Houston Dynamo	2–2	Minnesota United FC	Houston, Texas
7:00 PM CDT	Vera (yellow card) 44'; Quintero 58'; Struna (yellow card) 67'; Figueroa 69'; Rodríguez (yellow card) 77'	Report	Molino 11'; Toye (yellow card) 40'; Lod 45+1'; Boxall (yellow card) 81'; Greguš (red card) 88'	Stadium: BBVA Compass Stadium; Attendance: 2,486; Referee: Victor Rivas

September 23 Match 13	Columbus Crew SC	2–1	Minnesota United FC	Columbus, Ohio
7:30 PM EDT	Zelarayán 31'; Santos 70'; Artur (yellow card) 90'	Report	Aja (yellow card) 50'; Métanire (yellow card) 61'; Gasper (yellow card) 80'; Lod 88'	Stadium: Mapfre Stadium; Attendance: 1,455; Referee: Ismail Elfath

September 27 Match 14	Minnesota United FC	0–0	Real Salt Lake	St. Paul, Minnesota
7:00 PM CDT	Métanire (yellow card) 37'	Report	Ruíz (yellow card) 32'; Glad (yellow card) 85'	Stadium: Allianz Field; Attendance: 0 Referee: Drew Fischer

October 3 Match 15	Minnesota United FC	2–0	FC Cincinnati	Saint Paul, Minnesota
7:00 PM CDT	Kamara 16' (pen.); Gasper (yellow card) 50'; Molino 69'; Lod (yellow card) 76'	Report	Deplagne (yellow card) 15'; Cruz (yellow card) 47'	Stadium: Allianz Field; Attendance: 0 Referee: Marcos de Oliveira

October 6 Match 16	Nashville SC	0–0	Minnesota United FC	Nashville, Tennessee
7:30 PM CDT	Leal (yellow card) 44'	Report		Stadium: Nissan Stadium; Attendance: 3,478; Referee: Joseph Dickerson

October 11 Match 17	FC Dallas	P–P	Minnesota United FC	Frisco, Texas
7:30PM CDT		Report		Stadium: Toyota Stadium
Note: Postponed due to two positive COVID-19 test results in the Minnesota organization.

October 14 Match 18	Minnesota United FC	P–P	Chicago Fire FC	Saint Paul, Minnesota
7:00 PM CDT				Stadium: Allianz Field
Note: Match postponed due to a suspected COVID-19 case on the MNUFC roster.

October 18 Match 19	Minnesota United FC	2–2	Houston Dynamo	Saint Paul, Minnesota
7:00 PM CDT	Finlay 11', 30'; Hayes (yellow card) 90+4'	Report	Lundkvist (yellow card) 9'; Rodríguez 59'; Hansen 83'	Stadium: Allianz Field; Attendance: 0 Referee: Elton García

October 24 Match 20	FC Cincinnati	0–1	Minnesota United FC	Cincinnati, Ohio
6:30 PM CDT	Bailey (yellow card) 81'	Report	Alonso (yellow card) 66'; Gasper (yellow card) 82'; Schoenfeld 90+2'	Stadium: Nippert Stadium; Attendance: 0 Referee: Malik Badawi

October 28 Match 21	Minnesota United FC	2–1	Colorado Rapids	Saint Paul, Minnesota
7:00 PM CDT	Lod 44'; Abubakar 89' (o.g.)	Report	Price (yellow card) 32'; Wilson (yellow card) 57'; Shinyashiki 69'	Stadium: Allianz Field; Attendance: 0 Referee: Tori Penso

November 4 Match 18	Minnesota United FC	2–2	Chicago Fire FC	Saint Paul, Minnesota
7:00 PM CST	Dibassy (yellow card) 41'; Aja 64', (yellow card) 90+5'; Lod 80'	Report	Berić 17'; Calvo (yellow card) 23'; Pineda 52'; Aliseda (yellow card) 78'	Stadium: Allianz Field; Attendance: 0 Referee: Victor Rivas
Note: Re-schedule of postponed October 14 match.

November 8 Match 17	Minnesota United FC	3–0	FC Dallas	Saint Paul, Minnesota
5:30PM CST	Molino 17', 79'; Métanire (yellow card) 29'; Reynoso 47'; Hairston (yellow card) 51'; Musa (yellow card) 87'	Report	Hollingshead (yellow card) 13'; Santos (yellow card) 30'; Reynolds (yellow card) 45+1'	Stadium: Allianz Field; Attendance: 0 Referee: Robert Sibiga

==== MLS Cup Playoffs ====
November 22 First round	Minnesota United FC	3–0	Colorado Rapids	Saint Paul, Minnesota
6:30 PM CST	Molino 22', 79'; Boxall (yellow card) 52'; Lod 54'	Report	Namli (yellow card) 44'; Abubakar (yellow card) 50'	Stadium: Allianz Field; Referee: Ted Unkel

December 3 Conf. Semifinals	Sporting Kansas City	0–3	Minnesota United FC	Kansas City, Kansas
8:00 PM CST		Report	Molino 27', 35'; Dibassy 39', (yellow card) 82'; Reynoso (yellow card) 42'; Greguš (yellow card) 57'; Gasper (yellow card) 80'; Hairston (yellow card) 84'	Stadium: Children's Mercy Park; Referee: Drew Fischer

December 7 Conf. Finals	Seattle Sounders FC	3–2	Minnesota United FC	Seattle, Washington
8:30 PM CST	A. Roldan (yellow card) 9'; O'Neill (yellow card) 27'; Bruin 75'; Ruidíaz 89'; Svensson 90+3'	Report	Reynoso 29'; Dibassy (yellow card) 62', (goal) 67'	Stadium: Lumen Field; Attendance: 0 Referee: Ismail Elfath

=== U.S. Open Cup ===
Due to the COVID-19 pandemic, US Soccer cancelled the competition.

=== Leagues Cup ===
July 21–22 Round of 16	Minnesota United FC (United States)	Cancelled	(Mexico)	Saint Paul, Minnesota
				Stadium: Allianz Field

== Statistics ==
=== Appearances and goals ===
Under "Apps" for each section, the first number represents the number of starts, and the second number represents appearances as a substitute.

No.	Pos	Nat	Player	Total		MLS (Note: MLS counted the three group stage games of the MLS is Back Tournament as regular season matches)		MLS is Back Knockout Stage		MLS Cup Playoffs	
No.	Pos	Nat	Player	Apps	Goals	Apps	Goals	Apps	Goals	Apps	Goals
1	GK	(United States) USA	Tyler Miller	3	0	0	0	3	0	0	0
2	DF	(New Zealand) NZL	Noah Billingsley	0	0	0	0	0	0	0	0
3	DF	(United States) USA	Ike Opara	0	0	0	0	0	0	0	0
4	DF	(Uruguay) URU	José Aja	3	0	0	0	3	0	0	0
5	MF	(United States) USA	Jacori Hayes	3	1	0	0	3	1	0	0
6	MF	(Cuba) CUB	Osvaldo Alonso	3	0	0	0	3	0	0	0
7	MF	(Trinidad and Tobago) TTO	Kevin Molino	1	0	0	0	1	0	0	0
8	MF	(Slovakia) SVK	Ján Greguš	3	0	0	0	3	0	0	0
9	FW	(Paraguay) PAR	Luis Amarilla	3	1	0	0	3	1	0	0
10	MF	(Argentina) ARG	Emanuel Reynoso	0	0	0	0	0	0	0	0
11	MF	(Uruguay) URU	Thomás Chacón	0	0	0	0	0	0	0	0
12	FW	(United States) USA	Aaron Schoenfeld	3	0	0	0	3	0	0	0
13	MF	(United States) USA	Ethan Finlay	3	0	0	0	3	0	0	0
14	DF	(United States) USA	Brent Kallman	0	0	0	0	0	0	0	0
15	DF	(New Zealand) NZL	Michael Boxall	3	0	0	0	3	0	0	0
16	FW	(Sierra Leone) SLE	Kei Kamara	0	0	0	0	0	0	0	0
17	MF	(Finland) FIN	Robin Lod	3	2	0	0	3	2	0	0
18	GK	(Canada) CAN	Greg Ranjitsingh	0	0	0	0	0	0	0	0
19	DF	(Madagascar) MAD	Romain Métanire	1	0	0	0	1	0	0	0
20	MF	(England) ENG	Sam Gleadle	0	0	0	0	0	0	0	0
21	DF	(Mali) MLI	Bakaye Dibassy	0	0	0	0	0	0	0	0
27	FW	(United States) USA	Foster Langsdorf	0	0	0	0	0	0	0	0
30	GK	(United States) USA	Adrian Zendejas	0	0	0	0	0	0	0	0
31	MF	(United States) USA	Hassani Dotson	3	0	0	0	3	0	0	0
41	DF	(New Zealand) NZL	James Musa	0	0	0	0	0	0	0	0
44	MF	(Canada) CAN	Raheem Edwards	3	0	0	0	3	0	0	0
77	DF	(United States) USA	Chase Gasper	3	0	0	0	3	0	0	0
89	MF	(United States) USA	Kevin Partida	0	0	0	0	0	0	0	0
94	MF	(United States) USA	Marlon Hairston	2	1	0	0	2	1	0	0
97	GK	(Canada) CAN	Dayne St. Clair	0	0	0	0	0	0	0	0
99	GK	(Luxembourg) LUX	Fred Emmings	0	0	0	0	0	0	0	0
Players who left Minnesota during the season:
23	FW	(United States) USA	Mason Toye	1	1	0	0	1	1	0	0

Source: Minnesota stats

=== Disciplinary record ===
No.	Pos.	Name	MLS (Note: MLS counted the three group stage games of the MLS is Back Tournament as regular season matches)		MLS is Back Knockout stage		2020 MLS Cup Playoffs		Total	
No.	Pos.	Name	Booked	Sent off (straight red)	Booked	Sent off (straight red)	Booked	Sent off (straight red)	Booked	Sent off (straight red)
1	GK	(United States) Tyler Miller	0	0	0	0	0	0	0	0
2	DF	(New Zealand) Noah Billingsley	0	0	0	0	0	0	0	0
3	DF	(United States) Ike Opara	0	0	0	0	0	0	0	0
4	DF	(Uruguay) José Aja	0	0	0	0	0	0	0	0
5	MF	(United States) Jacori Hayes	0	0	0	0	0	0	0	0
6	MF	(Cuba) Osvaldo Alonso	0	0	0	0	0	0	0	0
7	MF	(Trinidad and Tobago) Kevin Molino	0	0	0	0	0	0	0	0
8	MF	(Slovakia) Ján Greguš	0	0	0	0	0	0	0	0
9	FW	(Paraguay) Luis Amarilla	0	0	0	0	0	0	0	0
10	MF	(Argentina) Emanuel Reynoso	0	0	0	0	0	0	0	0
11	MF	(Uruguay) Thomás Chacón	0	0	0	0	0	0	0	0
12	FW	(United States) Aaron Schoenfeld	0	0	0	0	0	0	0	0
13	MF	(United States) Ethan Finlay	0	0	0	0	0	0	0	0
14	DF	(United States) Brent Kallman	0	0	0	0	0	0	0	0
15	DF	(New Zealand) Michael Boxall	0	0	0	0	0	0	0	0
16	FW	(Sierra Leone) Kei Kamara	0	0	0	0	0	0	0	0
17	MF	(Finland) Robin Lod	0	0	0	0	0	0	0	0
18	GK	(Canada) Greg Ranjitsingh	0	0	0	0	0	0	0	0
19	DF	(Madagascar) Romain Métanire	0	0	0	0	0	0	0	0
20	MF	(England) Sam Gleadle	0	0	0	0	0	0	0	0
21	DF	(Mali) Bakaye Dibassy	0	0	0	0	0	0	0	0
27	FW	(United States) Foster Langsdorf	0	0	0	0	0	0	0	0
30	GK	(United States) Adrian Zendejas	0	0	0	0	0	0	0	0
31	MF	(United States) Hassani Dotson	0	0	0	0	0	0	0	0
41	DF	(New Zealand) James Musa	0	0	0	0	0	0	0	0
44	MF	(Canada) Raheem Edwards	0	0	0	0	0	0	0	0
77	DF	(United States) Chase Gasper	0	0	0	0	0	0	0	0
89	MF	(United States) Kevin Partida	0	0	0	0	0	0	0	0
94	MF	(United States) Marlon Hairston	0	0	0	0	0	0	0	0
97	GK	(Canada) Dayne St. Clair	0	0	0	0	0	0	0	0
99	GK	(Luxembourg) Fred Emmings	0	0	0	0	0	0	0	0
Players who left Minnesota during the season:
23	FW	(United States) Mason Toye	0	0	0	0	0	0	0	0

Source: Minnesota stats

=== Clean sheets ===
No.	Name	MLS (Note: MLS counted the three group stage games of the MLS is Back Tournament as regular season matches)	MLS is Back Knockout stage	MLS Cup Playoffs	Total	Games Played
1	(United States) Tyler Miller	0	0	0	0	0
18	(Canada) Greg Ranjitsingh	0	0	0	0	0
97	(Canada) Dayne St. Clair	0	0	0	0	0

Source: Minnesota stats
