= Noah Billingsley =

New Zealand footballer

Personal information
- Full name: Noah James Billingsley
- Date of birth: 6 August 1997 (age 29)
- Place of birth: Wellington, New Zealand
- Height: 6 ft 2 in (1.88 m)
- Position: Defender

Team information
- Current team: Eastern Suburbs
- Number: 16

College career
Years	Team	Apps	(Gls)
2016–2019	UC Santa Barbara Gauchos	69	(6)

Senior career*
Years	Team	Apps	(Gls)
2014–2015	Wanderers SC	7	(0)
2015–2016	Waitakere United	4	(0)
2020–2021	Minnesota United	1	(0)
2020	→ Las Vegas Lights (loan)	9	(0)
2021	→ Phoenix Rising (loan)	8	(0)
2022	Waterside Karori	0	(0)
2022–2023	Christchurch United	15	(2)
2023–2024	Auckland United	26	(0)
2024–	Eastern Suburbs	42	(1)

International career
2015–2017	New Zealand U20	11	(1)
2018	New Zealand	3	(0)
- * Club domestic league appearances and goals as of 9 May 2026

Noah James Billingsley (born 6 August 1997) is a New Zealand professional footballer who plays as a fullback.

== Club career ==
He played for UC Santa Barbara Gauchos.

He played for Minnesota United FC.

In 2021, Billingsley spent time on loan with USL Championship side Phoenix Rising FC.

On December 1, 2021, Minnesota United FC declined Billingsley's contract option.

In June 2022, Billingsley played in a Chatham Cup match with Waterside Karori before signing a contract with Christchurch United. Christchurch United went on to win their first Southern League title.

In March 2023, Billingsley joined Auckland United.

In March 2024, Billingsley joined Eastern Suburbs.

== International career ==
Billingsley made New Zealand football history when he scored New Zealand's first ever goal at a Men's U-20 World Cup in the team's 5–1 win over Myanmar.

== Personal life ==
Billingsley attended Onslow College in Wellington before heading to America for university.

== Career statistics ==
=== Club ===
As of match played 9 November 2020

Appearances and goals by club, season and competition
Club	Season	League			National Cup		Other		Total	
Club	Season	Division	Apps	Goals	Apps	Goals	Apps	Goals	Apps	Goals
Wanderers SC	2014–15	Premiership	7	0	—		0	0	7	0
Waitakere United	2015–16	Premiership	4	0	—		0	0	4	0
Minnesota United	2020	Major League Soccer	1	0	—		0	0	1	0
Las Vegas Lights (loan)	2020	USL Championship	9	0	—		0	0	9	0
Waterside Karori	2022	National League	0	0	1	0	0	0	1	0
Career total			21	0	0	0	0	0	21	0

=== International ===
As of match played 7 June 2018

Appearances and goals by national team and year
National team	Year	Apps	Goals
New Zealand	2018	3	0
Total		3	0
