= Thomás Chacón =

Uruguayan footballer (born 2000)

Personal information
- Full name: Thomás Chacón Yona
- Date of birth: 17 August 2000 (age 26)
- Place of birth: Palmitas, Uruguay
- Height: 1.64 m (5 ft 5 in)
- Position: Midfielder

Team information
- Current team: FC Aarau
- Number: 14

Youth career
- Danubio

Senior career*
Years	Team	Apps	(Gls)
2017–2019	Danubio	20	(2)
2019–2022	Minnesota United	6	(0)
2021	→ Liverpool (loan)	23	(2)
2022–2025	Bellinzona	85	(11)
2025–	FC Aarau	18	(0)

International career^{‡}
2014–2015	Uruguay U15	24	(0)
2016–2017	Uruguay U17	26	(2)
2018–2019	Uruguay U20	22	(0)
Medal record
Men's football
Representing Uruguay
South American U-20 Championship
Third place	2019 Chile
South American U-15 Championship
Runner-up	2015 Colombia
- * Club domestic league appearances and goals as of 17 May 2026 ‡ National team caps and goals as of 30 May 2019

Thomás Chacón Yona (born 17 August 2000) is a Uruguayan footballer who plays as a midfielder for Swiss club FC Aarau.

== Club career ==
A youth academy product of Danubio, Chacón made his professional debut on 23 November 2017 in a 2–2 draw against El Tanque Sisley. He scored his first goal on 10 March 2019 in a 1–1 draw against River Plate Montevideo.

On 7 August 2019, MLS club Minnesota United announced the signing of Chacón as a Young Designated Player.

On 5 April 2021, Chacón signed on loan with Uruguayan Primera División side Liverpool until 31 December 2021, with Liverpool holding an option to make the deal permanent.

On 26 January 2022, Minnesota opted to buyout Chacón's contract at the club.

On 27 August 2022, Chacón joined Bellinzona in Switzerland. Following the expiry of his contract at Bellinzona, Chacón joined fellow Challenge League side FC Aarau on 3 September 2025, on a one-year contract with an option to extend.

== International career ==
Chacón is a former Uruguay youth international. He has represented Uruguay at four different age level tournaments including 2019 FIFA U-20 World Cup.

== Career statistics ==
=== Club ===
As of 20 May 2024

Appearances and goals by club, season and competition
Club	Season	League			Cup		Continental		Other		Total	
Club	Season	Division	Apps	Goals	Apps	Goals	Apps	Goals	Apps	Goals	Apps	Goals
Danubio	2017	Uruguayan Primera División	1	0	—		—		—		1	0
Danubio	2018	Uruguayan Primera División	6	0	—		0	0	—		6	0
Danubio	2019	Uruguayan Primera División	13	2	—		0	0	—		13	2
Danubio	Total		20	2	—		0	0	—		20	2
Minnesota United	2019	MLS	2	0	0	0	—		0	0	2	0
Minnesota United	2020	MLS	4 (Note: Includes one appearance in MLS is Back Tournament group stage.)	0	—		—		0	0	4	0
Minnesota United	Total		6	0	0	0	—		0	0	6	0
Liverpool (loan)	2021	Uruguayan Primera División	23	2	—		—		—		23	2
Bellinzona	2022–23	Swiss Challenge League	27	3	2	0	—		—		29	3
Bellinzona	2023–24	Swiss Challenge League	32	4	3	0	—		—		35	4
Bellinzona	Total		59	7	5	0	—		—		64	7
Career total			108	11	5	0	0	0	0	0	113	11
