= Blake Frischknecht =

American soccer player (born 1995)

Personal information
- Date of birth: May 10, 1995 (age 31)
- Place of birth: Murrieta, California, United States
- Height: 6 ft 3 in (1.91 m)
- Position: Forward

Youth career
- Las Vegas Soccer Academy

College career
Years	Team	Apps	(Gls)
2013–2014	BYU Cougars	20	(6)
2017–2019	Utah Valley Wolverines	54	(20)

Senior career*
Years	Team	Apps	(Gls)
2017	BYU Cougars	5	(3)
2018–2019	Ogden City	5	(4)
2019	Orange County FC	3	(3)
2020	Las Vegas Lights	13	(3)
2021	Chattanooga Red Wolves	19	(1)
- * Club domestic league appearances and goals as of October 31, 2021

Blake Frischknecht (born May 10, 1995) is an American professional soccer player.

== Career ==
=== College and amateur ===
Frischknecht began playing college soccer at Brigham Young University, before taking a two-year hiatus from soccer to complete a mission for the Church of Jesus Christ of Latter-day Saints in Bahia Blanca, Argentina. Upon his return to the United States, Frischknecht transferred to Utah Valley University, where he played for three seasons, scoring 20 goals and tallying 2 assists in 54 appearances for the Wolverines.

Whilst at college, Frischknecht appeared in the USL PDL for his college team, BYU Cougars during and after his years of enrollment at the college. He also played with Ogden City SC in 2018 and 2019. Following his time with Ogden City in the PDL, he went to play with NPSL side Orange County FC. Frischknecht made headlines in May 2019 when his 89th-minute goal gave OCFC the lead over Las Vegas Lights FC in the Third Round of the 2019 U.S. Open Cup. The win made history for Orange County, which became the first NPSL side to ever beat two professional teams in a single U.S. Open Cup tournament.

=== Professional ===
On August 13, 2020, Frischknecht signed with local USL Championship side Las Vegas Lights. He made his professional debut on August 15, 2020, appearing as a 78th-minute substitute during a 1–0 loss to Orange County SC.

On April 7, 2021, Frischknecht joined USL League One side Chattanooga Red Wolves SC ahead of the 2021 season.

== Personal life ==
While at BYU Frischknecht appeared with other members of his team in the Studio C viral video "Top Soccer Shootout Ever With Scott Sterling". In the fictional Penalty shoot-out between Yale and North Carolina he plays the roll of Tarheels' player "Lambert".

== Career statistics ==
As of matches played August 26, 2020

Club	Season	League			Cup (Note: Includes appearances in U.S. Open Cup)		League Cup		Total	
Club	Season	Division	Apps	Goals	Apps	Goals	Apps	Goals	Apps	Goals
BYU Cougars	2017	Premier Developmental League	5	3	0	0	0	0	5	3
Ogden City	2018	Premier Developmental League	0	0	0	0	0	0	0	0
Ogden City	2019	USL League Two	5	4	0	0	0	0	5	4
Ogden City	Total		5	4	0	0	0	0	5	4
Orange County	2019	National Premier Soccer League	3	3	4	1	0	0	7	4
Las Vegas Lights	2020	USL Championship	4	1	0	0	0	0	4	1
Career total			17	11	4	1	0	0	21	12
