= Manny Perez (soccer) =

American soccer player (born 1999)

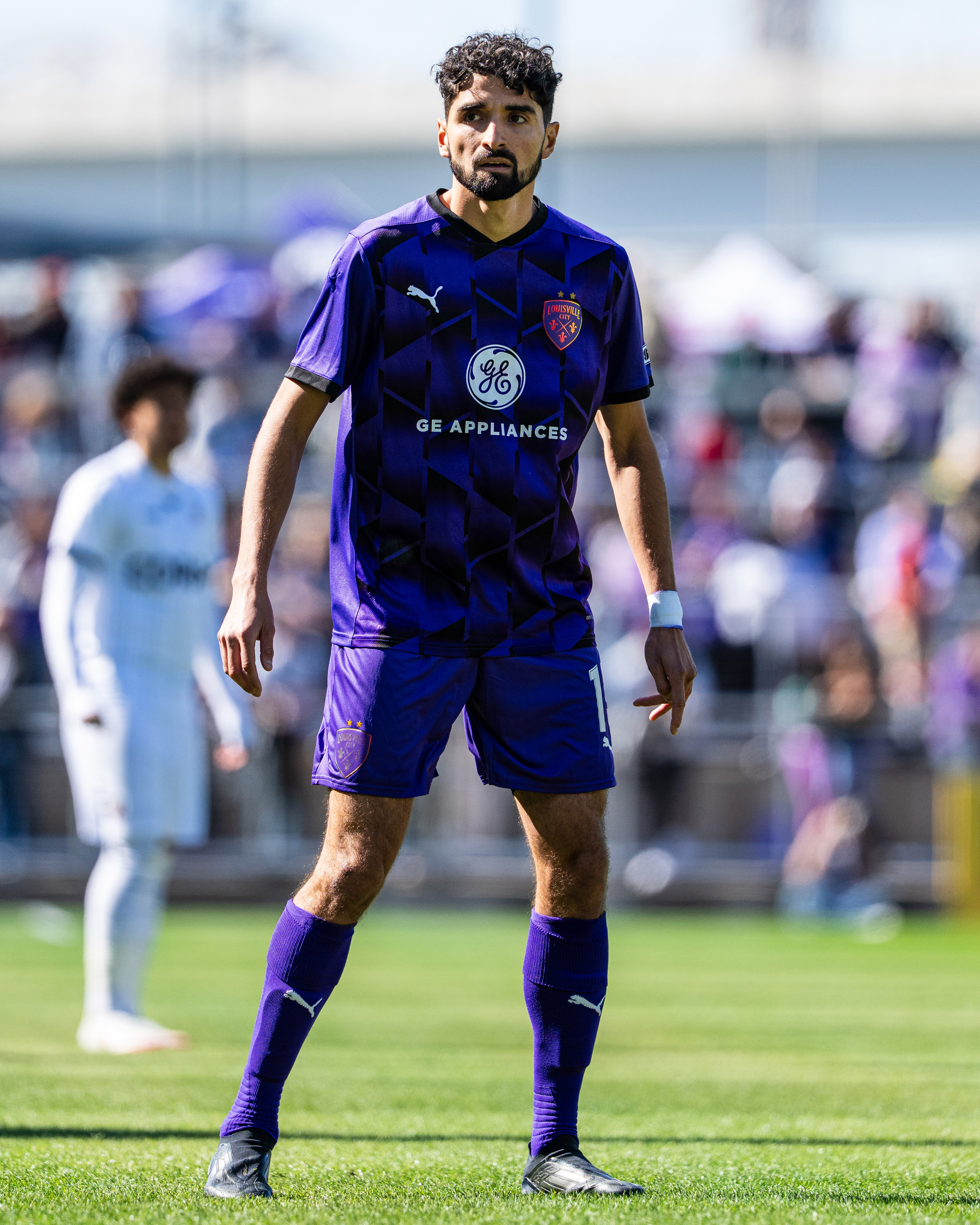
- Perez with Louisville City in 2025

Personal information
- Full name: Emanuel Perez
- Date of birth: February 19, 1999 (age 27)
- Place of birth: Garner, North Carolina, United States
- Height: 1.84 m (6 ft 1/2 in)
- Position: Right-back

Team information
- Current team: Louisville City
- Number: 15

Youth career
- 2014–2017: North Carolina FC

College career
Years	Team	Apps	(Gls)
2017–2018	NC State Wolfpack	29	(6)

Senior career*
Years	Team	Apps	(Gls)
2019–2021	Celtic	0	(0)
2019–2020	→ North Carolina FC (loan)	35	(1)
2021	Portland Timbers	0	(0)
2021	→ Austin FC (loan)	10	(0)
2022–2023	Louisville City	60	(0)
2024	Horsens	4	(0)
2024–	Louisville City	46	(3)

International career
2017	United States U18	8	(2)
2018	United States U20	6	(1)
2019	United States U23	1	(0)
- * Club domestic league appearances and goals as of November 7, 2026

Emanuel "Manny" Perez (born February 19, 1999) is an American professional soccer player who plays as a right-back for Louisville City in the USL Championship.

== College career ==
Perez played two years of college soccer at North Carolina State University between 2017 and 2018, making a total of 29 appearances for NCSU, scoring 6 goals and tallying 9 assists.

== Professional career ==
=== Celtic ===
On January 31, 2019, Perez joined Scottish Premiership side Celtic. Perez was immediately loaned out to USL Championship side North Carolina FC. He was again loaned to North Carolina FC ahead of the 2020 USL Championship season. Perez left the club after two seasons without playing a game.

==== Loan to North Carolina FC ====
After joining the club on loan, Perez made his first team debut for North Carolina in a 4–1 win against defending champions Louisville City. He went on to make 23 appearances for the club that he represented during his youth. Of those games he started 12 times. He returned to NCFC for a second season on loan during the 2020 season. This was a season that was marred by the COVID-19 pandemic and shortened from the standard number of games; however, Perez went on to make a further 14 appearances for his boyhood club before returning to Celtic.

=== Austin FC ===
On April 26, 2021, it was announced that Perez had signed a contract with the Portland Timbers and was immediately loaned to Austin FC. Austin has the option to trade for Perez for $100,000 GAM at the end of the season. Following the 2021 season, Perez's contract option was declined by Austin and he returned to Portland.

Following the 2021 season, Perez returned to Portland, but they opted to decline their contract option on him and he left club.

=== Louisville City ===
On February 15, 2022, Perez signed with USL Championship side Louisville City.

=== AC Horsens ===
On January 4, 2024, Perez joined Danish side Horsens for an undisclosed fee, reported to be in the region of DKr375.000 plus add-ons, signing a contract until June 2027 with the club. In the process, he became Louisville City's third player to complete a move to a European club, following Jonathan Gómez and Joshua Wynder.

On August 8, 2024, Perez had his contract terminated as there was no prospect of playing time for him at the Danish club.

== Personal life ==
Born in the United States, Perez is of Mexican descent.

== Career statistics ==
As of match played September 29, 2021

Appearances and goals by club, season and competition
Club	Season	League			Playoffs		National cup		Continental		Total	
Club	Season	Division	Apps	Goals	Apps	Goals	Apps	Goals	Apps	Goals	Apps	Goals
Celtic	2018–19	Scottish Premiership	—		—		—		—		0	0
North Carolina FC (loan)	2019	USL Championship	21	0	—		2	0	—		23	0
North Carolina FC (loan)	2020	USL Championship	14	1	—		—		—		14	1
North Carolina FC (loan)	Total		35	1	—		2	0	—		37	1
Portland Timbers	2021	Major League Soccer	0	0	—		—		—		0	0
Austin FC (loan)	2021	Major League Soccer	10	0	—		—		—		10	0
Career total			45	1	0	0	2	0	0	0	47	1

== Honors ==
United States U20

- CONCACAF U-20 Championship: 2018
