= Darrin MacLeod =

Canadian soccer player

Personal information
- Date of birth: March 4, 1994 (age 32)
- Place of birth: Kitchener, Ontario, Canada
- Height: 1.91 m (6 ft 3 in)

Youth career
- 2003–2006: Waterloo Minor SC
- 2007–2012: Oakville SC

College career
Years	Team	Apps	(Gls)
2013–2016	Drake Bulldogs	76	(0)

Senior career*
Years	Team	Apps	(Gls)
2013–2014	K-W United	12	(0)
2015–2016	TFC Academy	19	(0)
2017–2018	Swope Park Rangers	9	(0)
2019	North Carolina FC	5	(0)

Managerial career
- 2021–2025: Sporting Kansas City II (goalkeeper coach)
- 2026–: Sporting Kansas City (goalkeeper coach)
- * Club domestic league appearances and goals as of 24 January 2026

Darrin MacLeod (born March 4, 1994) is a retired Canadian professional soccer player who is currently the goalkeeping coach for Sporting Kansas City of MLS.

== Career ==
=== Youth ===
MacLeod played for Kitchener Minor Soccer from 2003 to 2006 before moving to Oakville Soccer Club playing for the 1994 Raiders A for 5 years, MacLeod and the Oakville Raiders would win the Ontario Cup in 2007 and 2009. MacLeod was awarded OSC (Oakville Soccer Club) Male Youth Athlete of the year for 2009.

MacLeod has previously trained with Newcastle United on multiple occasions as well as Sporting of Portugal.

=== College ===
MacLeod played four years of college soccer at Drake University between 2013 and 2016. He didn't appear as a Freshman in 2012 and redshirted his senior year in 2016. MacLeod finished as All-Time Goalkeeper Leader in program history in games (76), minutes (6940:22), saves (308), shut-outs (19) and wins (33)

While at college, MacLeod played for Premier Development League sides K-W United and TFC Academy.

=== Professional ===
==== Swope Park Rangers ====
In February 2017, MacLeod signed with Swope Park Rangers of the United Soccer League . He made his professional debut on August 6, 2017 in a 0–0 draw with Saint Louis FC, earning a penalty save. After two seasons with Swope Park, MacLeod was released at the end of the 2018 season.

==== North Carolina FC ====
In February 2019, MacLeod joined North Carolina FC, another USL club.

== Coaching ==
After finishing his playing career, MacLeod joined Sporting Kansas City as the goalkeeping coach for the club's academy.

In February 2021, MacLeod was named goalkeeping coach for SKC's USL Championship side Sporting Kansas City II.

After five years as reserve team goalkeeper coach, MacLeod was promoted to the first team staff in 2026.

== Career statistics ==
As of match played September 28, 2019

Club	Season	League			League Cup		Open Cup		Continental		Total	
Club	Season	Division	Apps	Goals	Apps	Goals	Apps	Goals	Apps	Goals	Apps	Goals
Swope Park Rangers	2017	United Soccer League	4	0	1	0	—		—		5	0
Swope Park Rangers	2018	United Soccer League	5	0	0	0	—		—		5	0
Swope Park Rangers	Total		9	0	1	0	0	0	0	0	10	0
North Carolina FC	2019	USL Championship	5	0	—		2	0	—		7	0
North Carolina FC	Total		5	0	0	0	2	0	0	0	7	0
Career total			14	0	1	0	2	0	0	0	17	0
