= José Aja =

Uruguayan footballer (born 1993)

Personal information
- Full name: José Manuel Aja Livchich
- Date of birth: 10 May 1993 (age 33)
- Place of birth: Montevideo, Uruguay
- Height: 1.92 m (6 ft 4 in)
- Position: Defender

Team information
- Current team: Unión Española
- Number: 18

Senior career*
Years	Team	Apps	(Gls)
2014–2017	Nacional	10	(0)
2015–2016	→ Racing Montevideo (loan)	12	(2)
2016	→ Orlando City (loan)	10	(0)
2017	Orlando City	15	(0)
2018	Vancouver Whitecaps	17	(1)
2019	Unión Española	21	(0)
2020	Minnesota United	13	(1)
2021–2022	Santiago Wanderers	20	(2)
2022	River Plate Montevideo	11	(1)
2022–2023	Santa Fe	46	(3)
2024	Independiente Medellín	15	(0)
2025	Juventud Las Piedras	15	(1)
2026–	Unión Española	1	(0)
- * Club domestic league appearances and goals as of 11 March 2026

José Manuel Aja Livchich (born 10 May 1993) is a Uruguayan professional footballer who plays for Chilean club Unión Española in the Primera B de Chile.

== Club career ==
Aja began his career with Nacional in 2014, also spending time on loan with Racing Club during the 2015–16 season. He went on loan to Major League Soccer side Orlando City on 21 July 2016.

On 24 February 2018, Aja was traded to Vancouver Whitecaps FC in exchange for $125,000 of Targeted Allocation Money and a conditional second-round pick in the 2021 MLS SuperDraft. Aja was released by Vancouver at the end of their 2018 season.

On 14 February 2020, Aja was signed by Minnesota United FC. He made his debut for Minnesota United on 12 July 2020 against Sporting Kansas City in the MLS is Back Tournament. When the COVID-19 pandemic in the United States forced play to resume with the MLS is Back Tournament tournament, Aja took on a major role in defence with the absence of other players, but his contract option was not exercised at the end of the season.

Aja moved to Santiago Wanderers in the Primera Division de Chile, spending a short time there before moving to River Plate of the Uruguayan Primera División, where he made nine appearances. He was then transferred to Independiente Santa Fe.

In January 2026, Aja returned to Unión Española after his stint in 2019.
