= Dre Fortune =

Trinidad and Tobago footballer (born 1996)

Personal information
- Full name: Andre Fortune II
- Date of birth: 3 July 1996 (age 30)
- Place of birth: Raleigh, North Carolina, United States
- Height: 1.80 m (5 ft 11 in)
- Position: Midfielder

Youth career
- 2012–2014: CASL Chelsea Academy

Senior career*
Years	Team	Apps	(Gls)
2015	Servette	0	(0)
2016	Rochester Rhinos	9	(0)
2017–2020	North Carolina FC	71	(16)
2021	Memphis 901	27	(2)
2022–2023	Nõmme Kalju	32	(5)
2024	Las Vegas Lights	13	(0)

International career^{‡}
2011	United States U15		
2013	Trinidad and Tobago U17	6	(3)
2019	Trinidad and Tobago U20	2	(2)
2019–2022	Trinidad and Tobago	11	(0)
- * Club domestic league appearances and goals as of 15 November 2024 ‡ National team caps and goals as of 8 February 2022

Andre "Dre" Fortune II (born 3 July 1996) is a professional footballer who plays as a midfielder. Born in the United States, he played for the Trinidad and Tobago national team.

== Club career ==
In 2011, Fortune spent time training with top clubs in Europe, including Barcelona, Manchester City and Tottenham Hotspur. Fortune also trialled in the United States with New York Red Bulls in June 2015, but elected not to sign with the club. He signed his first professional contract in the US with United Soccer League side Rochester Rhinos.

In 2017, Fortune signed with North Carolina FC, becoming the first product of the team's development academy to sign a professional contract with the team.

Fortune served as an assistant coach for the North Carolina FC U23 squad during the 2018 PDL season.

He was named USL Championship Player of the Week for Week 14 of the 2019 season after scoring two goals in a 3–1 win over the Tampa Bay Rowdies. He earned the honor again in Week 24 after scoring two goals and an assist in a 5–0 win over Pittsburgh Riverhounds SC.

In 2020, Fortune led North Carolina FC in scoring and was named the team's Offensive Player of the Year and Most Valuable Player for the season.

On 11 May 2021, Fortune moved to USL Championship side Memphis 901.

In February 2022, Fortune signed a three-year contract with Meistriliiga club Nõmme Kalju. He was Meistriliiga Player of the Month in August 2023.

Fortune returned to the United States, joining USL Championship side Las Vegas Lights on 14 June 2024.

== International career ==
In September 2019, Fortune was called to the senior Trinidad and Tobago national team squad for the first time for CONCACAF Nations League fixtures against Martinique.

He made his debut on 14 October 2019 in a friendly against Venezuela and earned his first start in a friendly against Ecuador on 15 November 2019.

Fortune was named as part of Trinidad and Tobago's 23-man squad for the 2021 CONCACAF Gold Cup.

== Personal ==
Fortune's brother, Jay, plays for Atlanta United of Major League Soccer.
