= Duval Wapiwo =

Cameroonian footballer (born 2000)

Personal information
- Full name: Duval Mba Wapiwo
- Date of birth: 20 January 2000 (age 26)
- Place of birth: Yaounde, Cameroon
- Height: 1.76 m (5 ft 9 in)
- Position: Midfielder

Team information
- Current team: Al-Rayyan
- Number: 20

Senior career*
Years	Team	Apps	(Gls)
–2019	Apejes FC de Mfou		
2019–2021	MFK Vyškov	0	(0)
2019	→ North Carolina FC (loan)	5	(0)
2020	→ Sporting Kansas City II (loan)	8	(0)
2021–2022	Al-Madina SC	0	(0)
2022–2023	ES Sétif	4	(0)
2024–2025	Al-Sharq		
2025–	Al-Rayyan		
- * Club domestic league appearances and goals as of October 6, 2020

Duval Mba Wapiwo (born 20 January 2000) is a Cameroonian football player who currently plays for Saudi Second Division League club Al-Rayyan.

Wapiwo joined USL Championship side North Carolina FC on loan for their 2019 season. After playing two games with NCFC in the 2019 U.S. Open Cup, Wapiwo made his league debut in a game against Loudoun United FC on 17 July 2019.

On 7 January 2020 he joined USL Championship side Sporting Kansas City II on loan.

In 2022, he joined ES Sétif.

On 19 May 2024, Wapiwo joined Saudi Second Division club Al-Sharq.

On 12 October 2025, Wapiwo joined Saudi Second Division club Al-Rayyan.
