= Steven Miller (soccer) =

American soccer player (born 1989)

Personal information
- Full name: Steven Paul Miller
- Date of birth: September 12, 1989 (age 37)
- Place of birth: Elkins Park, Pennsylvania, United States
- Height: 5 ft 11 in (1.80 m)
- Positions: Defender; midfielder; forward

College career
Years	Team	Apps	(Gls)
2007–2011	Colgate Raiders		

Senior career*
Years	Team	Apps	(Gls)
2008–2009	Ocean City Barons	23	(8)
2012	Michigan Bucks	10	(1)
2012–2013	Jammerbugt FC	24	(3)
2014	Wilmington Hammerheads	26	(3)
2015	Tulsa Roughnecks	28	(3)
2015	→ Carolina RailHawks (loan)	5	(0)
2016–2020	North Carolina FC	127	(19)
Total		243	(37)
- * Club domestic league appearances and goals as of September 13, 2020

Steven Paul Miller (born September 12, 1989) is an American former professional soccer player who previously played for North Carolina FC.

== Career ==
=== College and amateur ===
Miller played five years of college soccer at Colgate University between 2007 and 2011, including a redshirted year in 2009. While at college, Miller also appeared for USL PDL club Ocean City Barons during their 2008 and 2009 seasons.

=== Professional ===
Miller was drafted in the third round (39th overall) of the 2012 MLS Supplemental Draft by Montreal Impact, but was not signed by the club. He spent 2012 with USL PDL club Michigan Bucks, before moving to Denmark to sign with Jammerbugt FC.

Miller signed with USL Pro club Wilmington Hammerheads on March 14, 2014. Miller signed with new USL club Tulsa Roughnecks on March 11, 2015.

On October 6, 2015, the Carolina RailHawks of the North American Soccer League announced that they had acquired Miller on loan from Tulsa for the remainder of the 2015 season. Miller started 5 games for the RailHawks in 2015 and on December 7, 2015, the RailHawks signed him to a multiyear contract. He appeared in 15 games for the RailHawks in 2016 and tallied 1 goal and 2 assists.

Miller is a regular guest on the popular podcast Raleigh City Sports. Miller announced on his most recent appearance that Raleigh City Sports is his official promotion/street team. Part of the partnership includes a web series with the working title "Weavin Around Raleigh" where Miller will explore different places in Raleigh.

Miller announced his retirement from professional soccer on February 15, 2021.
