= Marios Lomis =

Dutch footballer (born 1995)

Personal information
- Date of birth: 24 January 1995 (age 31)
- Place of birth: Bennebroek, Netherlands
- Height: 1.88 m (6 ft 2 in)
- Position: Forward

Team information
- Current team: Koninklijke HFC
- Number: 11

Youth career
- –2012: Koninklijke HFC

College career
Years	Team	Apps	(Gls)
2017	Creighton Bluejays	17	(5)

Senior career*
Years	Team	Apps	(Gls)
2012–2013	Koninklijke HFC		
2013–2014	ADO '20	17	(2)
2014–2017	VV Noordwijk		
2018–2019	North Carolina FC	36	(11)
2020	El Paso Locomotive	5	(0)
2020	North Carolina FC	12	(0)
2021	Greenville Triumph	26	(14)
2022	Sirens	11	(3)
2023	Lefkimmi	0	(0)
2023	Chattanooga Red Wolves	12	(2)
2024–	Koninklijke HFC	18	(3)
- * Club domestic league appearances and goals as of 00:31, 9 February 2025 (UTC)

Marios Lomis (born 24 January 1995) is a Dutch professional footballer who plays as a forward for Tweede Divisie club Koninklijke HFC. Besides the Netherlands, he has played in the United States, Malta and Greece.

== Career ==
=== College & youth ===
Lomis started playing football in his native Netherlands with Koninklijke HFC, ADO '20 and VV Noordwijk, where he scored 13 goals in his final season with the Hoofdklasse club before moving to the United States to play college soccer at Creighton University in their 2017 season. He left Creighton after just one year, where he scored 5 goals in 17 appearances.

=== Professional ===
On 17 January 2018, Lomis signed with United Soccer League club North Carolina FC. After suffering an ankle injury in the first half of the 2019 season, Lomis was named North Carolina FC's Comeback Player of the Year for 2019.

On 2 January 2020, Lomis made the move to USL Championship side El Paso Locomotive. After five games with El Paso, he transferred back to North Carolina FC on 7 August 2020.

On 12 March 2021, Lomis joined Greenville Triumph in USL League One.

In August 2024, Lomis returned to Koninklijke HFC, competing in the Tweede Divisie.
