= Caleb Duvernay =

American soccer player (born 1996)

Personal information
- Date of birth: July 24, 1996 (age 30)
- Place of birth: Cary, North Carolina, United States
- Height: 1.70 m (5 ft 7 in)
- Position: Defender

Youth career
- North Carolina FC Youth

College career
Years	Team	Apps	(Gls)
2014–2017	NC State Wolfpack	67	(2)

Senior career*
Years	Team	Apps	(Gls)
2015–2018	North Carolina U23	23	(1)
2019–2020	North Carolina	16	(0)
- * Club domestic league appearances and goals as of July 17, 2020

Caleb Duvernay (born July 24, 1996) is an American professional soccer player who plays as a defender.

== Career ==
=== College & Youth ===
Duvernay played four years of college soccer at the North Carolina State University between 2014 and 2017.

While at college, Duvernay played with Carolina RailHawks U23s in the National Premier Soccer League in 2015 and 2016, and North Carolina FC U23 in the USL PDL in 2017.

=== Professional ===
On January 21, 2018, Duvernay was selected 61st overall in the 2018 MLS SuperDraft by Portland Timbers. However, he did not sign with the club. He instead spent 2018 playing in the USL PDL with North Carolina U23.

On March 15, 2019, Duvernay signed his first professional contract with USL Championship side North Carolina FC. He appeared in 16 games with the club over parts of two seasons before leaving the team on August 24, 2020.
