= Robert Kristo =

Croatian-American footballer (born 1993)

Personal information
- Full name: Robert Kristo
- Date of birth: 14 May 1993 (age 33)
- Place of birth: Travnik, Bosnia and Herzegovina
- Height: 1.93 m (6 ft 4 in)
- Position: Forward

Team information
- Current team: St. Louis Ambush
- Number: 11

College career
| Years | Team | Apps | (Gls) |
| 2011–2014 | Saint Louis Billikens | 75 | (41) |

Senior career*
| Years | Team | Apps | (Gls) |
| 2015–2016 | Spezia | 0 | (0) |
| 2015 | → Fidelis Andria (loan) | 10 | (1) |
| 2016 | → Tuttocuoio (loan) | 9 | (1) |
| 2016–2018 | VfL Osnabrück | 25 | (1) |
| 2019–2021 | North Carolina FC | 57 | (15) |
| 2021– | St. Louis Ambush (indoor) | 57 | (42) |
- * Club domestic league appearances and goals as of November 27, 2024

Robert Kristo (born 14 May 1993) is a Croatian American footballer who plays as a forward for the St. Louis Ambush of the Major Arena Soccer League.

== Early life ==
Kristo was born to Bosnian Croat parents in Bosnia and Herzegovina. His family moved to the United States during the Bosnian War. He is a practicing Catholic. He grew up in St. Louis, Missouri and attended Saint Louis University. He is engaged to Lacey Shuman, a former elite High Jumper at N.C. State University.

== Professional ==
Kristo joined USL Championship side North Carolina FC on 23 January 2019.

After the team moved to USL League One for the 2021 season, Kristo resigned with the team.

Kristo returned to his hometown of St. Louis in late 2021, signing with the Major Arena Soccer League's St. Louis Ambush.
