= Yamikani Chester =

Malawian football player

Personal information
- Date of birth: 20 December 1994 (age 31)
- Place of birth: Blantyre, Malawi
- Height: 1.80 m (5 ft 11 in)
- Position: Winger

Senior career*
Years	Team	Apps	(Gls)
2012–2017	Azam Tigers		
2017–2018	BE FORWARD Wanderers		
2018–2019	MFK Vyškov	0	(0)
2019	→ North Carolina FC (loan)	21	(5)
2020	Las Vegas Lights	10	(4)

International career^{‡}
- Malawi U20
2015–	Malawi	15	(0)
- * Club domestic league appearances and goals as of May 6, 2021 ‡ National team caps and goals as of September 10, 2019

Yamikani Chester (born 20 December 1994) is a Malawian football player who plays as a winger.

He represented the Malawi U20s at the 2011 COSAFA U-20 Cup.

Chester played for North Carolina FC in 2019, while on loan from MFK Vyškov.

In December 2019, Chester joined Las Vegas Lights FC of the USL Championship.

In 2021, it was reported that Chester and MFK Vyškov mutually agreed to terminate his contract, bringing his European spell to an end.

In July 2025, Chester joined Mozambican top-flight club UD Songo, completing a move to the Campeonato Moçambicano de Futebol. The transfer was reported by Times Malawi, which described the deal as part of Chester's continued professional career in southern African football following previous spells in Europe and North America.
