= Graham Smith (soccer, born 1994) =

American soccer player

Personal information
- Full name: Graham Devlin Smith
- Date of birth: April 9, 1994 (age 32)
- Place of birth: New Hope, Pennsylvania, United States
- Height: 1.73 m (5 ft 8 in)
- Position: Defensive midfielder

College career
| Years | Team | Apps | (Gls) |
| 2012–2013 | Pittsburgh Panthers | 17 | (0) |
| 2014–2016 | South Florida Bulls | 60 | (0) |

Senior career*
| Years | Team | Apps | (Gls) |
| 2014–2015 | Reading United | 17 | (2) |
| 2016–2017 | AGMK | 19 | (0) |
| 2017 | Central FC | 0 | (0) |
| 2018–2020 | North Carolina FC | 46 | (0) |
- * Club domestic league appearances and goals as of October 3, 2020

Graham Smith (born April 9, 1994) is an American professional soccer player.

== Career ==
=== College & Youth ===
Smith played two years of college soccer at the University of Pittsburgh between 2012 and 2013, before transferring to the University of South Florida in 2014.

=== Central FC ===
Smith was one of a plurality of players flown in on three-week contracts to play for Trinidadian team Central FC in the 2017 Caribbean Club Championship. He started his club's first round in the competition against Grenades F.C. of the Grenada Premier Division and played in their match versus Dominican Republic side Cibao FC, earning a yellow card.

=== Professional ===
On March 15, 2018, Smith signed with United Soccer League club North Carolina FC.
