= Sam Brotherton =

New Zealand footballer (born 1996)

Personal information
- Full name: Samuel Edward Brotherton
- Date of birth: 29 October 1996 (age 30)
- Place of birth: Auckland, New Zealand
- Height: 1.87 m (6 ft 2 in)
- Position: Central defender

Youth career
- Westlake Boys High School

College career
Years	Team	Apps	(Gls)
2015–2016	Wisconsin Badgers	33	(3)

Senior career*
Years	Team	Apps	(Gls)
2014–2015	Wanderers SC	16	(1)
2016	Des Moines Menace	5	(0)
2017–2019	Sunderland	0	(0)
2018	→ Blyth Spartans (loan)	1	(0)
2019–2020	North Carolina FC	42	(3)
2021–2022	Auckland City FC	37	(4)
2023	Forward Madison FC	15	(0)

International career^{‡}
2015	New Zealand U20	7	(1)
2015–	New Zealand U23	3	(0)
2015–2023	New Zealand	12	(0)
- * Club domestic league appearances and goals as of 16 October 2023 ‡ National team caps and goals as of 29 January 2019

Samuel Edward Brotherton (born 29 October 1996) is a New Zealand former professional footballer who played as a defender. Brotherton also played with the New Zealand national team.

== Club career ==
Brotherton started his career in the ASB Premiership with Wanderers SC and made his debut in the opening of the 2014–15 ASB Premiership against Waitakere United in the 3–2 loss. He scored his first goal for the club in a 3–1 win over Canterbury United in round 8.

In 2015, he moved to the United States and signed for University of Wisconsin. Playing in the Big Ten Conference during his freshman year, Brotherton would go on to make 17 appearances in 19 games for Wisconsin.

=== Sunderland ===
On 1 February 2017, Brotherton completed a deal with English Premier League side Sunderland until the summer of 2019.

=== North Carolina FC ===
On 29 January 2019, Brotherton joined USL Championship side North Carolina FC.

=== Auckland City FC ===
Brotherton signed with Auckland City FC of the New Zealand Football Championship on 22 January 2021.

=== Forward Madison FC ===
Brotherton signed with Forward Madison FC of USL League One on 16 January 2023.

Brotherton announced his retirement from professional football after the 2023 season.

== International career ==
Brotherton has represented New Zealand at several levels with his first representation being with the touring New Zealand under-19 schoolboys national team in England and Ireland in which he was vice captain. The team would go on to score wins against the U18 and U19 national teams of Ireland and Wales and draws against Scotland and England.

Brotherton was then announced in the New Zealand national under-20 football team for the 2015 FIFA U-20 World Cup which was to be held in New Zealand. Brotherton would go on to score his first international goal for New Zealand in the tournament in their 5–1 victory over Myanmar at Wellington Regional Stadium.

Brotherton was part of the New Zealand national under-23 football team that participated in the 2015 Pacific Games, which doubled as qualification for the Football at the 2016 Summer Olympics.

Brotherton's first senior international appearance would also arrive in 2015. He was called up to the squad to face South Korea in March, however did not make an appearance. He would however be recalled for New Zealand's friendly against Oman in Seeb, Oman. Brotherton played the whole 90 minutes in which New Zealand won 1–0.
