= D. J. Taylor (soccer) =

American soccer player (born 1997)

Personal information
- Full name: David Justin Taylor
- Date of birth: August 26, 1997 (age 29)
- Place of birth: Raleigh, North Carolina, United States
- Height: 5 ft 8 in (1.73 m)
- Position: Full-back

Team information
- Current team: Minnesota United
- Number: 27

Youth career
- 2010–2013: CASL Chelsea
- 2012–2015: North Carolina FC Youth
- 2015–2016: Torre Levante

Senior career*
Years	Team	Apps	(Gls)
2015–2016	Torre Levante		
2017	Buñol		
2017–2020	North Carolina FC	83	(1)
2021–	Minnesota United	95	(1)
2022–	Minnesota United 2	12	(1)

International career
2015	United States U18	2	(1)
- * Club domestic league appearances and goals as of November 6, 2025

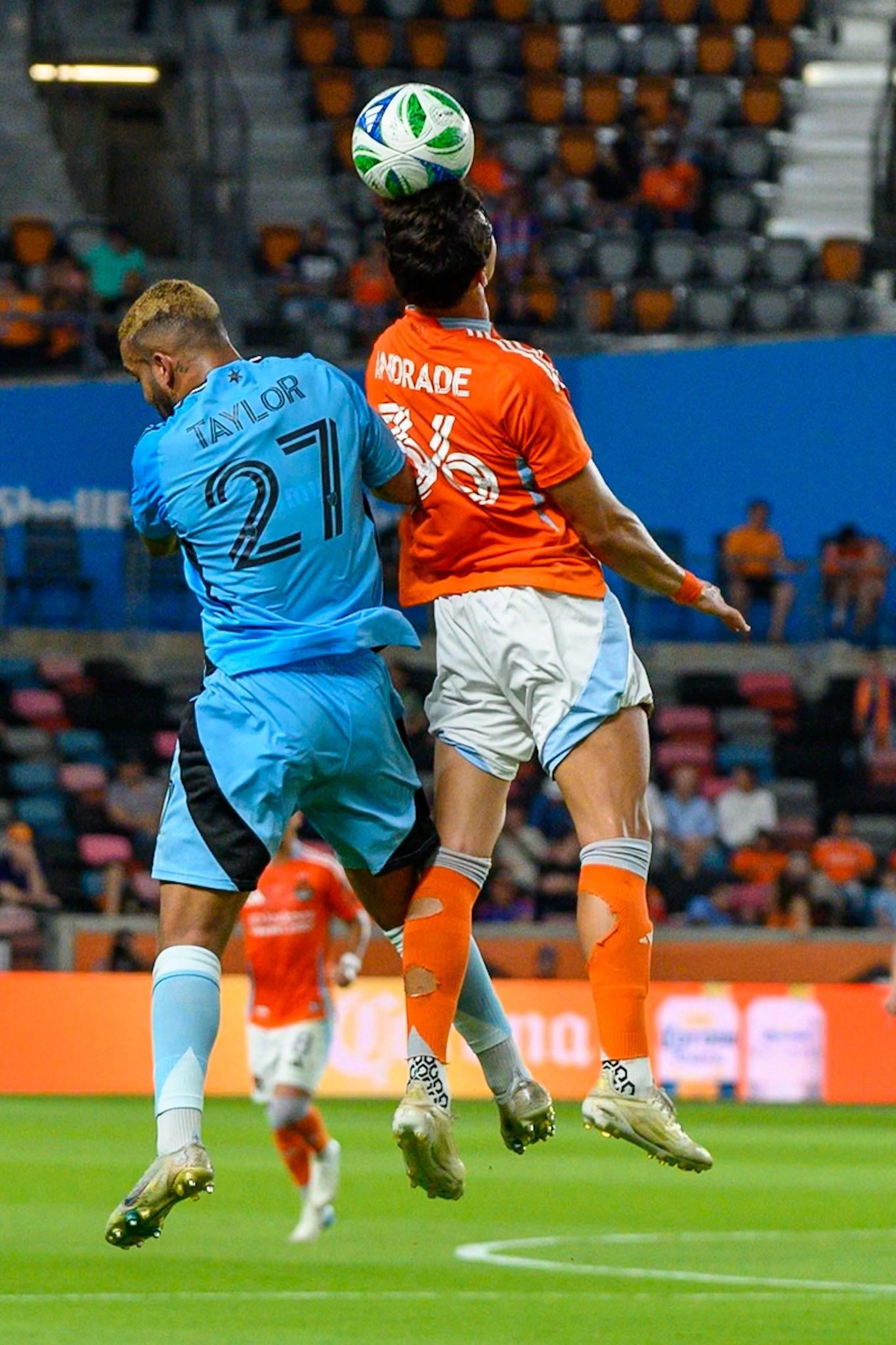
Taylor (left) in a match against the Houston Dynamos (May 2025)

David Justin Taylor (born August 26, 1997) is an American professional soccer player who plays as a full-back for Major League Soccer club Minnesota United.

== Club career ==
Born in Raleigh, North Carolina, Taylor spent four years with CASL Chelsea before joining the academy system at North Carolina FC, then named Carolina RailHawks. He signed an amateur contract with the RailHawks first-team in May 2015 but did not make an appearance before moving abroad.

Later that year, Taylor signed with Spanish Tercera División Torre Levante and joined their youth side. He then joined Buñol in 2017.

=== North Carolina FC ===
On July 27, 2017, Taylor returned to the United States and signed a professional contract with North Carolina FC in the North American Soccer League. A few days prior to signing, Taylor had appeared for North Carolina FC in a friendly against Swansea City as a guest player. He made his debut for the club on August 13 against the Jacksonville Armada. He started and played 65 minutes as North Carolina FC drew the match 2–2.

After appearing in just two matches for the side in 2017, Taylor established himself as the starting right-back for the club's debut season in the USL Championship, playing 32 matches. He started 33 matches the following season. On January 6, 2020, Taylor signed a contract extension with the club, keeping him with North Carolina FC for a fourth season.

=== Minnesota United ===
On February 16, 2021, Taylor joined Major League Soccer (MLS) club Minnesota United. He made his debut for the club on July 3, 2021, coming on as a substitute in a 2–2 home draw against the San Jose Earthquakes. He scored his first MLS goal against FC Dallas on May 22, 2022.

== International ==
In 2015, Taylor made two appearances for the United States under-18 side in the Copa Chivas Tournament, scoring one goal.

== Career statistics ==
=== Club ===
As of match played on May 24, 2023

Appearances and goals by club, season and competition
Club	Season	League			National cup		Continental		Total	
Club	Season	Division	Apps	Goals	Apps	Goals	Apps	Goals	Apps	Goals
North Carolina FC	2017	North American Soccer League	2	0	0	0	—	—	2	0
North Carolina FC	2018	United Soccer League	32	0	3	0	—	—	35	0
North Carolina FC	2019	USL Championship	34	0	3	1	—	—	37	1
North Carolina FC	2020	USL Championship	15	1	—	—	—	—	15	1
North Carolina FC	Total		83	1	6	1	0	0	89	2
Minnesota United	2021	Major League Soccer	8	0	0	0	—	—	8	0
Minnesota United	2022	Major League Soccer	27	1	3	0	—	—	30	0
Minnesota United	2023	Major League Soccer	11	3	3	0	—	—	14	0
Minnesota United	Total		46	1	6	0	0	0	52	1
Career total			129	2	12	1	0	0	135	3
