= 2020 Hartford Athletic season =

Hartford Athletic
2020 season
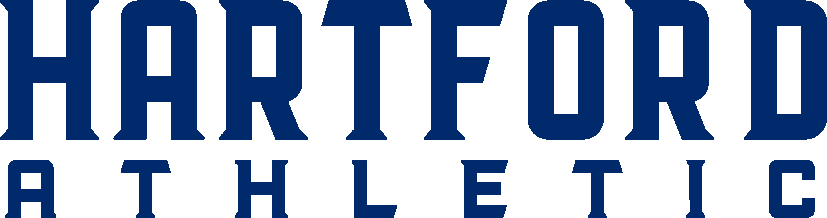
- Owner: Hartford Sports Group
- Head coach: Radhi Jaïdi
- Stadium: Dillon Stadium
- USL Championship: Group F: 1st Eastern Conf.: 2nd
- USLC Playoffs: Conf. Quarterfinals
- U.S. Open Cup: Cancelled
- Highest home attendance: 1,375 (6 times)
- Lowest home attendance: 1,207 (July 20 vs. Loudoun)
- Average home league attendance: 1,351
- Biggest win: HFD 4–1 LDN (Aug. 2); PHI 0–3 HFD (Sept. 20)
- Biggest defeat: PIT 5–0 HFD (Sept. 12)
Home colors	Away colors

The 2020 Hartford Athletic season was the club's second season of existence and their second in the USL Championship, the second tier of American soccer. This article covers the period from October 20, 2019, the day after Hartford's final match of the 2019 regular season, to the conclusion of the 2020 USLC Playoff Final, scheduled for November 12–16, 2020.

== Season in review ==
=== Background, off-season and pre-season ===
Hartford finished its inaugural season in next to last place in the Eastern Conference, seven table positions and fourteen points out of the playoff spots. The club parted ways with head coach Jimmy Nielsen just seven days after the 2019 season's end and signed former Southampton U-23 coach Radhi Jaïdi to fill the vacancy on November 8. The club also parted ways with COO Donovan Powell five days later.

The club began announcing roster moves in October, also, quickly announcing the return of four players from the 2019 roster (Harry Swartz, Alex Dixon, Alex Davey, and Nicky Downs), with the return of Danny Barrera and Mads Jørgensen being announced in early November, and the return of Mike Novotny being announced in early December. New signings began in earnest in late November with the addition of Aiden Mesias, former Fresno FC defender Sam Strong, Brazilian defender Gabriel Torres, 2019 Greenville Triumph center back Kevin Politz, Cal State Northridge products Dre Deas and Alex Lara, Dartmouth midfielder Noah Paravicini, and UT-Rio Grande Valley midfielder Arthur Rogers. In January, the club signed San Antonio FC's all-time leading scorer Éver Guzmán, Brazilian defender Matheus Silva, and announced the return of forward Mac Steeves. In February, the club announced loan deals for goalkeeper Parfait Mandanda and Southampton U-23 midfielder Tyreke Johnson.

== Roster ==
As of September 4, 2020

No.	Position	Nation	Player
2	DF	USA	Alex Lara
3	DF	BRA	Matheus Silva
4	DF	USA	Kevin Politz
5	DF	SCO	Alex Davey
6	MF	ENG	Arthur Rogers
7	MF	USA	Noah Paravicini
8	MF	DEN	Mads Jørgensen
9	FW	USA	Mac Steeves
10	MF	USA	Danny Barrera
11	FW	USA	Alex Dixon
16	MF	BRA	Gabriel Torres
17	FW	USA	Alfonso Vazquez
18	GK	USA	Mike Novotny
25	DF	ISR	Idan Cohen
20	FW	NOR	Markus Naglestad
21	MF	USA	Nicky Downs
23	MF	ENG	Aiden Mesias
24	DF	USA	Sam Strong
28	MF	USA	Conor McGlynn
33	MF	USA	Harry Swartz
35	GK	COD	Parfait Mandanda (on loan from Charleroi)
42	FW	USA	Dre Deas
80	MF	USA	Justin Haak (on loan from New York City FC)
88	MF	ENG	Tyreke Johnson (on loan from Southampton)
99	FW	MEX	Éver Guzmán

== Competitions ==
=== Exhibitions ===
==== Match results ====
February 12, 2020 Preseason 1	Hartford Athletic	3–0	Newtown Pride FC	Farmington, Connecticut
	Mac Steeves 30'; Conor McGlynn; Tyler Turner	Report		Stadium: Farmington Sports Arena

February 14, 2020 Preseason 2	New York Red Bulls II	2–3	Hartford Athletic	Montclair, New Jersey
	Goal	Report	Alfonso Vazquez; Mads Jørgensen; Mac Steeves	Stadium: MSU Soccer Park at Pittser Field

February 19, 2020 Preseason 3	Hartford Athletic	5–1	New England Revolution II	Farmington, Connecticut
1:00 PM EST	Guzmán 12', 15', 38', 45+1'; Vasquez 76'	Report	Trialist 66'	Stadium: Farmington Sports Arena

February 22, 2020 Preseason 4	New England Revolution II	1–0	Hartford Athletic	Foxborough, Massachusetts
1:00 PM EST	Presley (yellow card) 20'; Spaulding 31'	Report	Silva (yellow card) 72'	Stadium: Gillette Stadium; Attendance: 0
Note: Closed door scrimmage

March 3, 2020 Preseason 5	Hartford Athletic	2–2	Hartford Hawks	Farmington, Connecticut
1:30 PM EST		Report		Stadium: Farmington Sports Arena

=== USL Championship ===
==== Standings — Group F ====
Pos	Team	Pld	W	D	L	GF	GA	GD	Pts	PPG	Qualification
1	Hartford Athletic	16	11	2	3	31	24	+7	35	2.19	Advance to USL Championship Playoffs
2	Pittsburgh Riverhounds SC	16	11	1	4	39	10	+29	34	2.13	Advance to USL Championship Playoffs
3	New York Red Bulls II	16	5	0	11	30	37	−7	15	0.94	
4	Philadelphia Union II	16	2	3	11	20	45	−25	9	0.56	
5	Loudoun United FC	13	1	3	9	10	28	−18	6	0.46	

Source: USL

==== Match results ====
In the preparations for the resumption of league play following the shutdown prompted by the COVID-19 pandemic, Hartford's schedule was announced on July 2.

July 17 1	New York Red Bulls II	0–1	Hartford Athletic	Montclair, NJ
7:00 PM EDT	Corfe (yellow card) 78'; Elney (yellow card) 90+4'	Report	Guzmán 12'; Silva (yellow card) 53'; Barrera (yellow card) 62'; Downs (yellow card) 89'; Deas (yellow card) 90+3'	Stadium: MSU Soccer Park at Pittser Field; Referee: Joshua Encarnación

July 20 2	Hartford Athletic	3–1	Loudoun United	Hartford, CT
7:00 PM EDT	Politz 3'; Swartz 45'; Johnson 55'; Dixon (yellow card) 65'	Report	Amoh (yellow card) 43', (goal) 58' (pen.); Doue (yellow card) 90'	Stadium: Dillon Stadium; Attendance: 1,207; Referee: Adam Kilpatrick

July 25 3	Hartford Athletic	3–2	Philadelphia Union II	Hartford, CT
7:00 PM EDT	Silva (yellow card) 29'; Torres 39'; Jørgensen 43'; Guzmán 53'; McGlynn (yellow card) 66'	Report	Scintu 4'; Picazo 16'; Kingue (yellow card) 90+7'	Stadium: Dillon Stadium; Attendance: 1,375; Referee: Thomas Snyder

July 29 4	Indy Eleven	4–1	Hartford Athletic	Indianapolis, IN
7:00 PM EDT	Moon 4'; Pasher 51'; Conner 81'; Watson 87'	Report	Swartz (yellow card) 33'; Davey (yellow card) 45+5'; Dixon 46'; Silva (yellow card) 90+3'	Stadium: Lucas Oil Stadium; Attendance: 4,775; Referee: Lukasz Szpala

August 2 5	Hartford Athletic	4–1	Loudoun United	Hartford, CT
7:00 PM EDT	Guzmán 7', 18'; Lara (yellow card) 45'; Barrera 66'; Dixon (yellow card) 84'; Torres (yellow card) 90+3'; Vazquez Villar 90+8'	Report	Amoh 21' (pen.), (yellow card) 56'	Stadium: Dillon Stadium; Attendance: 1,375; Referee: Jeremy Scheer

August 9 6	Philadelphia Union II	P–P	Hartford Athletic	Chester, PA
TBA PM EDT				Stadium: Talen Energy Stadium
Note: Match postponed due to positive covid-19 test in the Union II organization.

August 15 7	Hartford Athletic	2–1	New York Red Bulls II	Hartford, CT
7:00 PM EDT	Dixon 21'; Silva (yellow card) 27'; Strong 40', (yellow card) 86'; Johnson (yellow card) 45+3'	Report	LaCava (yellow card) 59'; Elney 74'	Stadium: Dillon Stadium; Attendance: 1,375; Referee: Ernie Constantine

August 19 8	Philadelphia Union II	P–P	Hartford Athletic	Chester, PA
7:00 PM EDT				Stadium: Talen Energy Stadium
Note: Match postponed due to positive covid-19 test in the Union II organization.

August 23 9	Hartford Athletic	2–2	Loudoun United	Hartford, CT
7:00 PM EDT	Swartz (yellow card) 28'; Barrera (yellow card) 67'; Silva (yellow card) 69'; Naglestad 85'; Dixon 89'	Report	Wiedt 22'; Ndour (yellow card) 23'; Amoustapha (yellow card) 44'; Amoh 73', (yellow card) 84'; Greene (yellow card) 88'	Stadium: Dillon Stadium; Attendance: 1,375; Referee: Thomas Snyder

August 28 10	Hartford Athletic	0–3	Pittsburgh Riverhounds SC	Hartford, CT
7:00 PM EDT	Lara (yellow card) 83'	Report	Gómez (yellow card) 7'; James 11', 50'; Griffin 22'	Stadium: Dillon Stadium; Attendance: 1,375; Referee: Jeremy Scheer

September 5 11	Hartford Athletic	2–1	Loudoun United	Hartford, CT
7:00 PM EDT	Silva (yellow card) 6'; Rogers 17', (yellow card) 56'; Strong (yellow card) 43'; Guzmán (yellow card) 70'; Torres 76'	Report	Fawole 4'; Ndour (yellow card) 30'; Mehl (yellow card) 77' (yellow-red card) 87'	Stadium: Dillon Stadium; Attendance: 1,375; Referee: Christian Centeno

September 12 12	Pittsburgh Riverhounds SC	5–0	Hartford Athletic	Pittsburgh, PA
7:00 PM EDT	James 13', 47'; Mensah 27', 61'; Velarde 42' (pen.)	Report	Strong (yellow card) 39'; Torres (yellow card) 81'; Naglestad (yellow card) 82'; Haak (yellow card) 83'	Stadium: Highmark Stadium; Referee: Eric Tattersall

September 16 13	Hartford Athletic	3–1	New York Red Bulls II	Hartford, CT
7:00 PM EDT	Silva 11'; Haak (yellow card) 43', (goal) 75'; Dixon 45+1'; Torres (yellow card) 54'; Barrera (yellow card) 68'	Report	Rito (yellow card) 40'; LaCava 64'; Clark (yellow card) 69'	Stadium: Dillon Stadium; Referee: Thomas Snyder

September 20 14	Philadelphia Union II	0–3	Hartford Athletic	Chester, PA
5:00 PM EDT	Huckaby (yellow card) 34'	Report	Dixon 8', 58'; Topey 13' (o.g.); Strong (yellow card) 44'; Johnson (yellow card) 90'	Stadium: Subaru Park; Referee: Luis Arroyo

September 23 15	Hartford Athletic	1–1	Philadelphia Union II	Hartford, CT
7:00 PM EDT	Strong 45+2', (yellow card) 88'; Cohen (yellow card) 56'; Jørgensen (yellow card) 68'	Report	McGlynn 76'; Aaronson (yellow card) 90'	Stadium: Dillon Stadium; Attendance: 1,375; Referee: Jeremy Scheer

September 26 16	Pittsburgh Riverhounds SC	0–1	Hartford Athletic	Pittsburgh, PA
7:00 PM EDT	Dos Santos (yellow card) 72'	Report	Guzmán (penalty missed) 30', 36'; Silva (yellow card) 47'; Politz (yellow card) 50'; Barrera (yellow card) 64'; Mandanda (red card) 71'; Novotny (yellow card) 89'; Haak (yellow card) 90+5'	Stadium: Highmark Stadium; Referee: Joshua Encarnación

September 30 17	Philadelphia Union II	2–3	Hartford Athletic	Chester, PA
7:30 PM EDT	Budler (yellow card) 7'; Cohen 22' (o.g.); Sorenson (yellow card) 42'; Stafford 60'	Report	Jørgensen 8' (pen.); Lara 15'; Dixon (yellow card) 25'; Strong (yellow card) 55'; Barrera 90'	Stadium: Subaru Park; Referee: Christian Centeno

October 4 18	New York Red Bulls II	0–2	Hartford Athletic	Montclair, NJ
7:00 PM EDT	Bounthong (yellow card) 48'; Sowe (yellow card) 55'; Dieye (yellow card) 83'	Report	Lara (yellow card) 39'; Johnson 65'; McGlynn 75'; Strong (yellow card) 90+1'	Stadium: MSU Soccer Park at Pittser Field; Referee: Sean Lyons

==== USL Cup Playoffs ====
October 10 First round	Hartford Athletic	0–1	Saint Louis FC	Hartford, CT
7:00 PM EDT	Silva (yellow card) 16'; Strong (yellow card) 45+1'; Barrera (yellow card) 61'; Politz (yellow card) 90+3'	Report	Greig (yellow card) 73'; Fall (yellow card) 89'; Rivas 90+3'	Stadium: Dillon Stadium; Attendance: 2,194; Referee: Kevin Broadley

=== U.S. Open Cup ===
As a USL Championship club, Hartford as enter the competition in the second round, to be played April 7–9. The 2020 U.S. Open Cup was cancelled due to the COVID-19 pandemic.

April 9 2nd Round	Hartford Athletic (Connecticut)	P–P	(Massachusetts) Western Mass Pioneers or (Maine) GPS Portland Phoenix	Hartford, CT
7:00 pm EDT				Stadium: Dillon Stadium
Note: Match cancelled due to the COVID-19 pandemic

== Statistics ==
=== Appearances and goals ===
No.	Pos	Nat	Player	Total		USLC	
No.	Pos	Nat	Player	Apps	Goals	Apps	Goals
11	FW	(United States) USA	Alex Dixon ||16 || 6 ||15 || 6				
99	FW	(Mexico) MEX	Éver Guzmán || 13 || 5 || 12|| 5				
4	DF	(United States) USA	Kevin Politz ||15  || 1||14 ||1				
33	MF	(United States) USA	Harry Swartz ||7  || 1||7 ||1				
23	MF	(England) ENG	Aiden Mesias || 14 || 0||13 ||0				
42	FW	(United States) USA	Dre Deas || 7 || 0|| 7||0				
28	MF	(United States) USA	Conor McGlynn ||10  ||1 ||9 ||1				
25	DF	(Israel) ISR	Idan Cohen || 8 || 0|| 7||0				
24	DF	(United States) USA	Sam Strong ||14  || 2|| 13||2				
21	DF	(United States) USA	Nicky Downs ||11  || 0|| 11||0				
20	FW	(Norway) NOR	Markus Naglestad || 9 ||1 || 8||1				
17	FW	(United States) USA	Alfonso Vazquez ||  4||1 || 4||1				
16	MF	(Brazil) BRA	Gabriel Torres ||15  || 2|| 14||2				
10	MF	(United States) USA	Danny Barrera || 17 ||2 || 16||2				
9	FW	(United States) USA	Mac Steeves ||0  || 0|| 0||0				
8	MF	(Denmark) DEN	Mads Jørgensen ||12  ||2 || 12||2				
6	MF	(England) ENG	Arthur Rogers ||15  ||1 ||14 ||1				
3	DF	(Brazil) BRA	Matheus Silva || 15 || 1|| 14||1				
2	DF	(United States) USA	Alex Lara ||12  ||1 || 12||1				
7	MF	(United States) USA	Noah Paravicini ||0  ||0 || 0||0				
80	MF	(United States) USA	Justin Haak || 8 ||1 ||7 ||1				
Players who left Hartford during the season:
85	MF	(England) ENG	Tyreke Johnson ||14  ||2 ||14 ||2				
5	DF	(England) ENG	Alex Davey || 3 || 0|| 3|| 0				

=== Disciplinary record ===
No.	Pos.	Name	USLC		Total	
No.	Pos.	Name	Yellow card	Red card	Yellow card	Red card
3	Defender	Matheus Silva	8	0	9	0
10	Midfielder	Danny Barrera	4	0	5	0
21	Midfielder	Nicky Downs	1	0	1	0
42	Forward	Dre Deas	1	0	0	1
11	Forward	Alex Dixon	3	0	3	0
28	Midfielder	Conor McGlynn	1	0	1	0
33	Midfielder	Harry Swartz	2	0	2	0
5	Defender	Alex Davey	1	0	1	0
16	Midfielder	Gabriel Torres	3	0	3	0
35	Goalkeeper	Parfait Mandanda	0	1	0	1
24	Defender	Sam Strong	7	0	8	0
12	Defender	Alex Lara	3	0	3	0
80	Midfielder	Justin Haak	3	0	3	0
4	Defender	Kevin Politz	1	0	2	0
88	Midfielder	Tyreke Johnson	2	0	2	0
18	Goalkeeper	Mike Novotny	1	0	1	0
8	Midfielder	Mads Jørgensen	1	0	1	0
6	Midfielder	Arthur Rogers	1	0	1	0
99	Forward	Ever Guzman	1	0	1	0
20	Forward	Markus Naglestad	1	0	1	0
25	Defender	Idan Cohen	1	0	1	0

=== Clean sheets ===
No.	Name	USLC	USLC Playoffs	Total	Games Played		
No.	Name	22	(Democratic Republic of the Congo) Parfait Mandanda	4	0	4	16
16	(United States) Mike Novotny	1	0	1	2		

== Transfers ==
=== In ===
Pos.	Player	Transferred from	Fee/notes	Date	Source
Defender	Sam Strong	Fresno FC	Free	December 1, 2019	
Defender	Gabriel Torres	Chattanooga FC	Free	December 9, 2020	
Defender	Kevin Politz	Greenville Triumph SC	Free	December 9, 2019	
Forward	Dre Deas	CSUN Matadors	Free	December 12, 2019	
Defender	Alex Lara	CSUN Matadors	Free	December 12, 2019	
Midfielder	Noah Paravicini	Napa Valley 1839 FC	Free	December 18, 2019	
Forward	Arthur Rogers	Texas–Rio Grande Valley Vaqueros	Free	December 23, 2020	
Forward	Ever Guzman	San Antonio FC	Free	January 8, 2020	
Midfielder	Matheus Silva	Miami FC	Free	January 13, 2020	
Midfielder	Conor McGlynn	FA Euro New York	Open tryouts	March 12, 2020	
Forward	Alfonso Vazquez	Windham High School	Open tryouts	March 12, 2020	
Forward	Markus Naglestad	Egersunds IK	Free	August 13, 2020	
Defender	Idan Cohen	Hapoel Tel Aviv F.C.	Free	September 3, 2020	

=== Out ===
Pos.	Player	Transferred to	Fee/notes	Date	Source
Defender	Alex Davey	(United States) Tampa Bay Rowdies	Free	September 2	

=== Loan in ===
Pos.	Player	Parent club	Length/Notes	Beginning	End	Source
Goalkeeper	Parfait Mandanda	(Belgium) R. Charleroi S.C.	Season long	February 20	End of season	
Midfielder	Tyreke Johnson	(England) Southampton F.C.	Season long	February 24	October 8	
Midfielder	Justin Haak	(United States) New York City FC	Remainder of the season	September 9	End of season	

=== Loan out ===
Pos.	Player	Loanee club	Length/Notes	Beginning	End	Source

== Kits ==
Home	Away	Charity Alternate

Type	Shirt	Shorts	Socks	First appearance / Record
Home	Green	Green	Green	Match 3 vs. Louisville / 6–2–1
Away	White	White	White	Match 1 vs. New York / 4–0–2
Charity; Alternate	Red	Red	Red	Match 15 vs. Philadelphia / 1–0–0

== See also ==
- Hartford Athletic
- 2020 in American soccer
- 2020 USL Championship season
