= 2020 New York Red Bulls II season =

New York Red Bulls II
2020 season
- Sporting director: Denis Hamlett
- Head Coacht: John Wolyniec
- Stadium: MSU Soccer Park
- USL Championship: Group F: 3rd Eastern Conf.: 14th
- USL Playoffs: Did not qualify
- Average home league attendance: 1,002
- Biggest win: NY 6–0 PHI (Sept. 9)
- Biggest defeat: PIT 4–1 NY (Aug. 8); NY 0–3 PIT (Sept. 5); NY 0–3 NC (Sept. 30)
Home colours	Away colours

The 2020 New York Red Bulls II season was the sixth ever season of competitive soccer played by the New York Red Bulls II, the reserve team of Major League Soccer's New York Red Bulls. The side participates in the USL Championship, the second-tier of American soccer.

== Roster ==
As of March 6, 2020

No.	Pos.	Nation	Player
2	DF	ENG	Mandela Egbo
8	MF	USA	Jared Stroud
17	FW	USA	Ben Mines
19	MF	USA	Alex Muyl
21	FW	USA	Omir Fernandez
37	MF	USA	Caden Clark
39	FW	USA	Sebastian Elney
51	MF	USA	Kyle Zajec
55	DF	USA	Preston Kilwien
60	GK	USA	Alex Bobocea
63	DF	GHA	Roy Boateng
65	GK	USA	Wallis Lapsley
66	MF	USA	Barry Sharifi
67	FW	GAM	Omar Sowe
70	MF	SEN	Cherif Dieye
72	DF	VEN	Edgardo Rito
73	DF	USA	Joe Fala
80	MF	USA	Chris Lema
88	MF	ENG	Deri Corfe
93	MF	USA	Bryce Lebel
97	DF	USA	Samad Bounthong

Signed to first team contract with New York Red Bulls.
New York Red Bulls Academy player.

== Competitive ==
=== USL Championship ===
==== Standings — Group F ====
Pos	Team	Pld	W	D	L	GF	GA	GD	Pts	PPG	Qualification
1	Hartford Athletic	16	11	2	3	31	24	+7	35	2.19	Advance to USL Championship Playoffs
2	Pittsburgh Riverhounds SC	16	11	1	4	39	10	+29	34	2.13	Advance to USL Championship Playoffs
3	New York Red Bulls II	16	5	0	11	30	37	−7	15	0.94	
4	Philadelphia Union II	16	2	3	11	20	45	−25	9	0.56	
5	Loudoun United FC	13	1	3	9	10	28	−18	6	0.46	

Source: USL

==== Match results ====
March 7 1	New York Red Bulls II	0–1	Tampa Bay Rowdies	Montclair, New Jersey
3:00 PM EDT	Muyl (yellow card) 40'; Kilwien (yellow card) 43'	Report	Fernandes (yellow card) 30', (goal) 56'; Hilton (yellow card) 66'; Dumbuya (yellow card) 86'	Stadium: MSU Soccer Park at Pittser Field; Attendance: 1,002; Referee: Kevin Broadley

July 17 2	New York Red Bulls II	0–1	Hartford Athletic	Harrison, New Jersey
TBA PM EDT	Corfe (yellow card) 78'; Elney (yellow card) 90+4'	Report	Guzmán 12'; Silva (yellow card) 53'; Barrera (yellow card) 62'; Downs (yellow card) 89'; Deas (yellow card) 90+3'	Stadium: Red Bull Arena; Referee: Joshua Encarnación

July 22 3	Philadelphia Union II	1–5	New York Red Bulls II	Chester, Pennsylvania
8:36 PM EDT	Miscic 46'; Flores (yellow card) 58'	Report	Corfe 10'; Boateng 53'; Edelman 56'; Fala (yellow card) 58'; Elney 59'; Sowe 75'	Stadium: Subaru Park; Referee: Christian Centeno

July 26 4	New York Red Bulls II	2–1	Pittsburgh Riverhounds SC	Harrison, New Jersey
5:00 PM EDT	Sowe 34', (yellow card) 58'; Kilwien (yellow card) 71'; Elney (yellow card) 88'; Corfe 90+5' (pen.)	Report	Thomas 9', (yellow card) 90+1'; Mertz (yellow card) 90+3'	Stadium: Red Bull Arena; Referee: Luis Arroyo

August 5 5	Philadelphia Union II	3–2	New York Red Bulls II	Chester, Pennsylvania
5:00 PM EDT	Bohui 1'; McGlynn 45+4'; Flores (yellow card) 61'; Jasinski 71'	Report	Elney 37' (pen.); Dieye 43'; Sharifi (yellow card) 54'	Stadium: Subaru Park; Referee: Joshua Encarnación

August 8 6	Pittsburgh Riverhounds SC	4–1	New York Red Bulls II	Pittsburgh, Pennsylvania
7:00 PM EDT	Mertz 3' (pen.), 61'; Thomas (yellow card) 15'; Dos Santos (yellow card) 42'; Mensah 65'; Velarde 80'	Report	Bounthong (yellow card) 2'; Toure 90+3'	Stadium: Highmark Stadium; Referee: Austin Saini

August 12 7	New York Red Bulls II	1–2	Loudoun United FC	Harrison, New Jersey
7:00 PM EDT	Lapsley (red card) 15'; Kilwien 79', (yellow card) 90+5'; Rito (yellow card) 90+1'	Report	Ku-DiPietro 45+4'; Amoh (yellow card) 60', (goal) 65' (pen.); Mehl (yellow card) 80'; Doue (yellow card) 85'	Stadium: Red Bull Arena; Referee: Jeremy Scheer

August 15 8	Hartford Athletic	2–1	New York Red Bulls II	Hartford, Connecticut
7:00 PM EDT	Dixon 21'; Silva (yellow card) 27'; Strong 40', (yellow card) 86'; Johnson (yellow card) 45+3'	Report	LaCava (yellow card) 59'; Elney 74'	Stadium: Dillon Stadium; Attendance: 1,375; Referee: Ernie Constantine

August 23 9	New York Red Bulls II	P–P	Philadelphia Union II	Harrison, New Jersey
TBA PM EDT				Stadium: Red Bull Arena
Note: Match postponed out of caution despite lack of positive covid-19 tests.

August 29 10	Loudoun United FC	2–3	New York Red Bulls II	Leesburg, Virginia
7:00 PM EDT	Amoustapha 40', 64'; Wiedt (yellow card) 90+6'	Report	LaCava 19', 45+5'; Boateng (yellow card) 22'; Dieye (penalty missed) 26'; Clark 56', (yellow card) 69'	Stadium: Segra Field; Attendance: 512; Referee: John Griggs

September 5 11	New York Red Bulls II	0–3	Pittsburgh Riverhounds SC	Harrison, New Jersey
5:00 PM EDT	Kilwien (yellow card) 11'; Boateng (yellow card) 16'; Dieye (yellow card) 26'; Rito (yellow card) 45+2'	Report	Lindstrom (yellow card) 23'; Mensah 45'; Kilwien 51' (o.g.); Mertz 58'; Dover (yellow card) 86'	Stadium: Red Bull Arena; Attendance: 0 Referee: Adam Kilpatrick

September 9 9	New York Red Bulls II	6–0	Philadelphia Union II	Harrison, New Jersey
5:00 PM EDT	Lema (penalty missed) 8'; Sowe 45', 45+2', 74'; Toure 72'; Clark 82', 90'; Zalinsky (yellow card) 89'	Report	Freese (yellow card) 7'; Bohui (yellow card) 88'	Stadium: Red Bull Arena; Referee: Luis Arroyo
Note: Re-schedule of postponed August 23, 2020 match.

September 16 12	Hartford Athletic	3–1	New York Red Bulls II	Hartford, Connecticut
7:00 PM EDT	Silva 11'; Haak (yellow card) 43', (goal) 75'; Dixon 45+1'; Torres (yellow card) 54'; Barrera (yellow card) 68'	Report	Rito (yellow card) 40'; LaCava 64'; Clark (yellow card) 69'	Stadium: Dillon Stadium; Referee: Thomas Snyder

September 23 13	Atlanta United 2	5–3	New York Red Bulls II	Kennesaw, Georgia
7:30 PM EDT	Conway 17', 45+2'; Bashti 20'; Goodrum 29'; Reilly (yellow card) 40'; Morales (yellow card) 43'; Gannon (yellow card) 69'; Mejia 71', (yellow card) 90'	Report	Toure 21'; LaCava 28'; Bounthong 83'; Clark (yellow card) 85'; Kilwien (yellow card) 90'	Stadium: Fifth Third Bank Stadium; Referee: Joshua Belk

September 26 14	New York Red Bulls II	5–4	Philadelphia Union II	Harrison, New Jersey
5:00 PM EDT	Sowe 13', 19'; Lema (yellow card) 37'; Zalinsky (yellow card) 41'; Dieye (yellow card) 42'; LaCava 65'; Cummins 67'; Fala 86'	Report	McGlynn 43' (pen.), 69'; Topey (yellow card) 46'; Picazo 55'; Flores 90' (pen.)	Stadium: Red Bull Arena; Referee: Ernie Constantine

September 30	Loudoun United FC	Cancelled	New York Red Bulls II	Leesburg, Virginia
TBA PM EDT				Stadium: Segra Field
Note: Match cancelled due to multiple positive COVID-19 tests in Loudoun United FC organization and a lack of rescheduling windows.

September 30 15	New York Red Bulls II	0–3	North Carolina FC	Richmond, Virginia
5:00 PM EDT	Cummins (yellow card) 44'; Hot (yellow card) 88'; Toure (yellow card) 90+3'	Report	Fortune 12' (pen.), (yellow card) 28'; Speas 26'; Tolkin 45+3' (o.g.)	Stadium: City Stadium; Referee: Matthew Franz
Note: Neutral site match scheduled to replace both teams' cancelled matches versus Loudoun United.

October 4 16	New York Red Bulls II	0–2	Hartford Athletic	Harrison, New Jersey
7:00 PM EDT	Bounthong (yellow card) 48'; Sowe (yellow card) 55'; Dieye (yellow card) 83'	Report	Lara (yellow card) 39'; Johnson 65'; McGlynn 75'; Strong (yellow card) 90+1'	Stadium: Red Bull Arena; Referee: Sean Lyons

=== U.S. Open Cup ===
Due to their ownership by a more advanced level professional club, Red Bulls II is one of 15 teams expressly forbidden from entering the Cup competition.

== Player statistics ==
=== Top scorers ===
Place	Position	Number	Name	USL	USL Cup	Total
1	FW	67	(The Gambia) Omar Sowe	7	0	7
2	FW	64	(United States) Jake LaCava	5	0	5
3	MF	37	(United States) Caden Clark	3	0	3
3	FW	39	(United States) Sebastian Elney	3	0	3
3	MF	96	(United States) Dantouma Toure	3	0	3
4	MF	88	(England) Deri Corfe	2	0	2
2	DF	55	(United States) Preston Kilwien	1	0	1
2	DF	63	(Ghana) Roy Boateng	1	0	1
2	MF	70	(Senegal) Cherif Dieye	1	0	1
2	DF	73	(United States) Joe Fala	1	0	1
2	MF	75	(United States) Daniel Edelman	1	0	1
2	MF	83	(United States) Boima Cummins	1	0	1
2	DF	97	(United States) Samad Bounthong	1	0	1
Total				30	0	30

- Updated to matches played on September 27, 2020.
