= 2021 Hartford Athletic season =

Hartford Athletic
2021 season
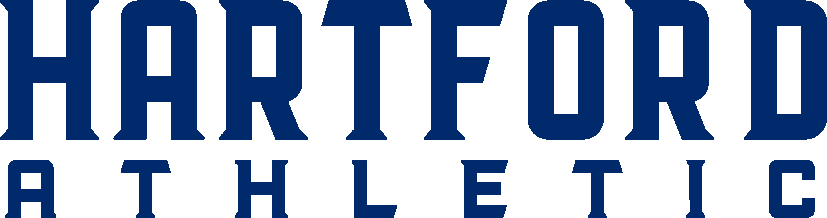
- Owner: Hartford Sports Group
- Head coach: Harry Watling
- Stadium: Dillon Stadium
- Highest home attendance: 5,138 (8/4 vs. TBR)
- Lowest home attendance: 3,480 (10/26 vs. CHS)
- Average home league attendance: 4,640
- Biggest win: HFD 7–0 NY (6/5)
- Biggest defeat: –2 goals (7 times): CHS 3–1 HFD (6/17) PIT 3–1 HFD (7/31) COL 4–2 HFD (8/7) MIA 2–0 HFD (8/22) NY 2–0 HFD (9/4) HFD 2–4 LOU (9/7) CLT 2–0 HFD (9/11)
| Home colors | Away colors |

The 2021 Hartford Athletic season is the club's third season of existence and their third in the USL Championship, the second tier of American soccer.

== Effects of the Covid-19 pandemic ==
To start the season, Hartford Athletic will allow 50% capacity at home games at Dillon Stadium.

Starting with the home game on May 29, they will be allowed to have a full capacity at home games.

== Roster ==
As of August 12, 2021

| No. | Pos. | Nation | Player |
|---|---|---|---|
| 1 | GK | MEX | Carlos Merancio |
| 2 | DF | USA | Alex Lara |
| 3 | DF | MAR | Younes Boudadi |
| 4 | DF | PUR | Nicolás Cardona |
| 5 | MF | GHA | Nii Armah Ashitey |
| 6 | MF | ENG | Arthur Rogers |
| 7 | FW | USA | Bradford Jamieson IV |
| 8 | MF | VEN | Christian Gómez |
| 9 | FW | USA | Sebastian Elney |
| 10 | MF | USA | Danny Barrera |
| 11 | MF | USA | Luka Prpa |
| 13 | GK | USA | Jeff Caldwell |
| 14 | FW | USA | Derek Dodson (on loan from Orlando City) |
| 15 | DF | TOG | Walid Yacoubou |
| 16 | MF | BRA | Gabriel Torres |
| 17 | FW | USA | Alfonso Vazquez |
| 18 | FW | ESA | Walmer Martinez |
| 19 | MF | USA | Kenan Hot |
| 20 | DF | USA | Thomas Janjigian |
| 21 | MF | ECU | Jaciel Cedeño |
| 22 | DF | USA | Richie Schlentz |
| 23 | FW | CMR | Tabort Etaka Preston |
| 24 | DF | PUR | Giovanni Calderón |
| 28 | MF | USA | Conor McGlynn |
| 29 | FW | HON | Juan Carlos Obregón Jr. |
| 31 | GK | USA | Sebastian Pliszka |

USL Academy player

== Competitions ==
=== Exhibitions ===
| April 3, 2021 | Hartford Athletic | 4–0 | Newtown Pride FC | Hartford, Connecticut |
| | Trialist 8 Elney; Trialist 4, | | | Stadium: Dillon Stadium |

| April 10, 2021 | New York City FC | 2–0 | Hartford Athletic | Hartford, Connecticut |
| | Medina 40', 44' | Report | | Stadium: Dillon Stadium |

| April 16, 2021 | New York Red Bulls II | 1–2 | Hartford Athletic | Montclair, New Jersey |
| | Sowe | Report | Elney; Obregón Jr. | Stadium: MSU Soccer Park |

| April 21, 2021 | Hartford Athletic | 3–3 | Philadelphia Union II | Hartford, Connecticut |
| 12:00 p.m. EST | Jamieson IV 3'; Janjigian 43'; Obregón Jr. 59' | Report | Stafford 13'; Sullivan 62'; Jasinski 83' | Stadium: Dillon Stadium |

| April 24, 2021 | Hartford Athletic | 3–0 | University of Hartford | Hartford, Connecticut |
| 7:00 p.m. EST | Rogers 29'; McGlynn 42'; Jeciel Cedeño (Trialist) 77' | Report | | Stadium: Dillon Stadium |

| May 4, 2021 | Hartford Athletic | 2–2 | New England Revolution II | Farmington, Connecticut |
| 7:00 p.m. EST | McGlynn 55'; Prpa 66' | Report | 1'; 86' | Stadium: Farmington Sports Arena |

| July 20, 2021 | Hartford Athletic | Cancelled | Western Mass Pioneers | Hartford, Connecticut |
| 7:00 p.m. EST | | Report | | Stadium: Dillon Stadium |

=== USL Championship ===
| April 30, 2021 | New York Red Bulls II | 2–3 | Hartford Athletic | Montclair, New Jersey |
| 7:00 p.m. EDT | LaCava 68'; Egbo 90+1' (pen.) | Report | Barrera 13'; Obregón Jr. 36'; Rogers 85' | Stadium: MSU Soccer Park; Referee: Joshua Encarnación |

| May 8, 2021 | Miami FC | 0–1 | Hartford Athletic | Miami, Florida |
| 7:30 p.m. EDT | | Report | Preston 59' | Stadium: Riccardo Silva Stadium; Referee: Matthew Thompson |

| May 15, 2021 | Hartford Athletic | 1–1 | Pittsburgh Riverhounds | Hartford, Connecticut |
| 7:00 p.m. EST | Prpa 90+1' | | Cicerone 42' | Stadium: Dillon Stadium |

| May 29, 2021 | Hartford Athletic | Postponed | Real Monarchs | Hartford, Connecticut |
| 7:00 p.m. EDT | | Report | | Stadium: Dillon Stadium |

| June 5, 2021 | Hartford Athletic | 7–0 | New York Red Bulls II | Hartford, Connecticut |
| 7:00 p.m. EDT | Obregón Jr. 15', 45+3'; Elney 45+2'; Barrera 50', 65'; Rogers (yellow card) 58'; McGlynn 59'; Preston 71'; Torres (yellow card) 82'; Lara (yellow card) 90+4' | Report | Knapp (yellow card) 32'; Egbo (yellow card) 51'; Castillo (yellow card) 62' | Stadium: Dillon Stadium; Attendance: 5,023; Referee: Thomas Snyder |

| June 13, 2021 | Charlotte Independence | 3–2 | Hartford Athletic | Charlotte, North Carolina |
| 7:00 p.m. EDT | Parra (penalty missed) 19'; Dimick (yellow card) 26'; Kelly 73'; Palomino 80'; Sabella 83', (yellow card) 85' | Report | Barrera 50'; Boudadi (yellow card) 66'; Preston 74' | Stadium: American Legion Memorial Stadium; Attendance: 533; Referee: Jon Freemon |

| June 19, 2021 | Hartford Athletic | 2–1 | Loudoun United | Hartford, Connecticut |
| 7:00 p.m. EDT | Obregón Jr. 6'; Yacoubou (yellow card) 77'; Cardona 90+5' | Report | Mehl (yellow card) 25'; Bolivar 78' (pen.); Houssou (yellow card) 86' | Stadium: Dillon Stadium; Attendance: 4,019; Referee: Christian Centeno |

| June 26, 2021 | Hartford Athletic | 0–1 | Tampa Bay Rowdies | Hartford, Connecticut |
| 7:00 p.m. EDT | Obregón Jr. (penalty missed) 56'; Lara (yellow card) 58' | Report | Guenzatti 33'; Fernandes (yellow card) 79' | Stadium: Dillon Stadium; Attendance: 4,966; Referee: Joshua Encarnación |

| July 4, 2021 | Loudoun United | 0–2 | Hartford Athletic | Leesburg, Virginia |
| 5:00 p.m. EDT | Bolívar (penalty missed) 58'; Gomez (yellow card) 89'; Downs (yellow card) 90'; Gamble (red card) 90+3' | Report | Gómez (yellow card) 44'; Rogers 64'; Preston 73'; Yacoubou (yellow card) 90+3' | Stadium: Segra Field; Attendance: 693; Referee: Jeremy Scheer |

| July 10, 2021 | Hartford Athletic | 2–2 | New York Red Bulls II | Hartford, Connecticut |
| 7:00 p.m. EDT | Barrera (yellow card) 36'; McGlynn (yellow card) 58'; Yacoubou (yellow card) 59'; Rogers (yellow card) 76'; Dodson 86'; Janjigian 90+2' | Report | Sowe 4'; Acosta 18'; Harper (yellow card) 24'; Zajec (yellow card) 39'; Tombul (yellow card) 61' (yellow-red card) 83' | Stadium: Dillon Stadium; Attendance: 5,002; Referee: Kyle Johnston |

| July 13, 2021 | Tampa Bay Rowdies | 0–1 | Hartford Athletic | St. Petersburg, Florida |
| 7:30 p.m. EDT | | Report | Dodson 23' | Stadium: Al Lang Stadium; Attendance: 2,943 |

| July 17, 2021 | Charleston Battery | 3–1 | Hartford Athletic | Mount Pleasant, South Carolina |
| 7:30 p.m. EDT | Piggott 21'; Repetto 58'; Nicque Daley 90' | Report | Tulu 83' | Stadium: Patriots Point Soccer Complex; Attendance: 3,515 |

| July 24, 2021 | Hartford Athletic | 2–0 | Miami FC | Hartford, Connecticut |
| 7:00 p.m. EDT | Lara 30'; McGlynn 67' | Report | Palacios (yellow card) 59'; Reid (yellow card) 82'; Kcira (yellow card) 90+5' | Stadium: Dillon Stadium; Attendance: 4,983; Referee: Mathew Corrigan |

| July 31, 2021 | Pittsburgh Riverhounds | 3–1 | Hartford Athletic | Pittsburgh, Pennsylvania |
| 7:00 p.m. EDT | Dixon 49', 83'; Wiedt (yellow card) 82'; Perez 88' | Report | Dodson 26'; Yacoubou (yellow card) 36' | Stadium: Highmark Stadium; Attendance: 3,879; Referee: Matthew Thompson |

| August 4, 2021 | Hartford Athletic | 1–1 | Miami FC | Hartford, Connecticut |
| 7:00 p.m. EDT | Dodson (yellow card) 4'; Jamieson 14' (pen.); McGlynn (yellow card) 20'; Martinez (yellow card) 66' | Report | Craig (yellow card) 13'; Othello 25'; Palacios (yellow card) 49' | Stadium: Dillon Stadium; Attendance: 5,065; Referee: Danielle Chesky |

| August 7, 2021 | Colorado Springs Switchbacks | 4–2 | Hartford Athletic | Colorado Springs, Colorado |
| 9:00 p.m. EDT | Barry 19' (pen.); Ngalina 38'; Lewis 51', 63' | Report | Yacoubou (yellow card) 18'; McGlynn 24'; Ashitey 58'; Martinez (yellow card) 90+4' | Stadium: Weidner Field; Attendance: 6,570; Referee: Malik Badawi |

| August 13, 2021 | Tampa Bay Rowdies | 1–0 | Hartford Athletic | St. Petersburg, Florida |
| 7:30 p.m. EST | Adebayo-Smith 85' | | | Stadium: Al Lang Stadium; Attendance: 3,682 |

| August 17, 2021 | Hartford Athletic | 2–1 | Charleston Battery | Hartford, Connecticut |
| 7:00 p.m. EST | Dodson 31'; Barrera 35' (pen.) | | Repetto 45' | Stadium: Dillon Stadium |

| August 22, 2021 | Miami FC | 2–0 | Hartford Athletic | Miami, Florida |
| 6:30 p.m. EDT | D. Williams (penalty missed) 45+1; Forbes 48', 90'; Sylvestre (yellow card) 87' | Report | Obregón Jr. (yellow card) 19'; Barrera (yellow card) 49'; Cedeño (yellow card) 67'; Rogers (yellow card) 85' | Stadium: Riccardo Silva Stadium; Attendance: 574; Referee: Elton García |

| August 28, 2021 | Hartford Athletic | 2–3 | Pittsburgh Riverhounds | Hartford, Connecticut |
| 7:00 p.m. EDT | Caldwell (yellow card) 1'; Obregón Jr. 18'; Yacoubou (red card) 36'; Barrera 51' (pen.); Martinez (yellow card) 54'; Lom (yellow card) 69' | Report | Cicerone 2' (pen.), 90+1'; Rovira (yellow card) 25'; Dixon (penalty missed) 37', 57'; Kilwien (yellow card) 45+2' | Stadium: Dillon Stadium; Attendance: 5,500; Referee: Jonathan Bilinski |

| September 1, 2021 | Hartford Athletic | P–P | Charleston Battery | Hartford, Connecticut |
| 7:00 p.m. EDT | | | | Stadium: Dillon Stadium |
Note: Match postponed due to inclement weather.

| September 4, 2021 | New York Red Bulls II | 2–0 | Hartford Athletic | Montclair, New Jersey |
| 7:00 p.m. EDT | LaCava 12'; Williams (yellow card) 48'; Rafanello (yellow card) 52'; Ngoma 90+2' | Report | Preston (yellow card) 52' | Stadium: MSU Soccer Park; Attendance: 803; Referee: Kenneth Rojas |

| September 7, 2021 | Hartford Athletic | 2–4 | Louisville City FC | Hartford, Connecticut |
| 7:00 p.m. EDT | Obregón Jr. 31'; Dodson 44' | Report | Lancaster 7'; González 29'; Ownby 56'; Hoppenot 59' | Stadium: Dillon Stadium; Attendance: 4,159; Referee: Sergii Demianchuk |

| September 11, 2021 | Charlotte Independence | 2–0 | Hartford Athletic | Charlotte, North Carolina |
| 7:00 p.m. EDT | Marveaux 36', 54'; Parra (yellow card) 41'; Palomino (yellow card) 57'; Bronico (yellow card) 60'; Martínez (yellow card) 64' | Report | Torres (yellow card) 12'; Boudadi (yellow card) 13'; McGlynn (yellow card) 89' | Stadium: American Legion Memorial Stadium; Attendance: 1,663; Referee: John Griggs |

| September 15, 2021 | Hartford Athletic | 2–0 | Real Monarchs | Hartford, Connecticut |
| 7:00 p.m. EDT | Obregón Jr. 30'; Cardona (yellow card) 69'; Flores 83' (o.g.) | Report | Orozco (yellow card) 5'; Halsey (yellow card) 45+2'; Saucedo (yellow card) 52'; Nydegger (yellow card) 67' | Stadium: Dillon Stadium; Attendance: 4,705; Referee: Kevin Broadley |

| September 25, 2021 | Hartford Athletic | 1–2 | Tampa Bay Rowdies | Hartford, Connecticut |
| 7:00 p.m. EDT | Yacoubou (yellow card) 31'; Haak (yellow card) 52'; McGlynn (yellow card) 63'; Preston (yellow card) 86'; Fernandes 79' | Report | Guenzatti 12', (penalty missed) 32', 45+2'; Hilton (yellow card) 27' | Stadium: Dillon Stadium; Attendance: 5,138; Referee: Lukasz Szpala |

| September 30, 2021 | Hartford Athletic | 1–2 | Charlotte Independence | Hartford, Connecticut |
| 8:00 p.m. EDT | Janjigian (yellow card) 17'; Haak (yellow card) 44'; McGlynn (yellow card) 67'; Bronico 82' (o.g.); Boudadi (yellow card) 86'; Elney (yellow card) 90' | Report | Martínez 12'; Kelly (yellow card) 48', (goal) 83'; Palomino (yellow card) 81'; Armour (red card) 90+1' | Stadium: Dillon Stadium; Attendance: 4,080; Referee: Elvis Osmanovic |

| October 6, 2021 | New Mexico United | 2–2 | Hartford Athletic | Albuquerque, New Mexico |
| 9:00 p.m. EST | Rivas 26'; Wehan (yellow card) 35'; Sandoval (yellow card) 45+3', (goal) 55'; Muhammad (yellow card) 53' | Report | Barrera 45+5' (pen.); Obregón Jr. 48'; Boudadi (yellow card) 84' | Stadium: Isotopes Park; Attendance: 6,444; Referee: Brad Jensen |

| October 10, 2021 | Charleston Battery | 4–3 | Hartford Athletic | Mount Pleasant, South Carolina |
| 2:00 p.m. EDT | Janjigian 2' (o.g.); Daley 10', 43'; Fahling 61'; Repetto (yellow card) 83' van Schaik (yellow card) 89' | Report | Barrera (yellow card) 40' (yellow-red card) 58'; Piggott 45+1' (o.g.); Haak (yellow card) 49'; Boudadi (yellow card) 74'; Obregón Jr. 81'; Hot 88' | Stadium: Patriots Point Soccer Complex; Attendance: 3,738; Referee: Joshua Encarnación |

| October 13, 2021 | Loudoun United | 2–3 | Hartford Athletic | Leesburg, Virginia |
| 7:00 p.m. EDT | Bolívar 13'; Garay (yellow card) 38'; Gabarra 51'; Gamble (yellow card) 56'; Mehl (yellow card) 59'; Pinto (yellow card) 73' | Report | Yacoubou (yellow card) 14'; McGlynn 57'; Obregón Jr. 69'; Pinto 81' (o.g.); Preston (yellow card) 90+5' | Stadium: Segra Field; Attendance: 368; Referee: DeShun Beard |

| October 16, 2021 | Hartford Athletic | 1–0 | Loudoun United | Hartford, Connecticut |
| 11:00 a.m. EST | McGlynn 33', (yellow card) 51'; Obregón Jr. (yellow card) 60'; Cardona (yellow card) 78'; Haak (yellow card) 87' | Report | Greene (yellow card) 32' | Stadium: Dillon Stadium; Attendance: 4,908; Referee: Benjamin Meyer |

| October 22, 2021 | Hartford Athletic | 1–2 | Charlotte Independence | Hartford, Connecticut |
| 7:00 p.m. EDT | Prpa (yellow card) 16'; Roberts 37' (o.g.); Preston (yellow card) 43'; Haak (yellow card) 90+3' | Report | Obertan 49'; Johnson 68'; Kelly (yellow card) 90+4' | Stadium: Dillon Stadium; Attendance: 5,500; Referee: Thomas Snyder |

| October 26, 2021 | Hartford Athletic | 2–0 | Charleston Battery | Hartford, Connecticut |
| 7:00 p.m. EDT | Martinez (yellow card) 8', (goal) 40', 70'; Cardona (yellow card) 84'; Rogers (yellow card) 88' | Report | Kelly-Rosales (yellow card) 86' | Stadium: Dillon Stadium; Attendance: 3,480; Referee: Natalie Simon |
Note: Re-schedule of postponed September 1st match.

| October 30, 2021 | Pittsburgh Riverhounds | 0–0 | Hartford Athletic | Pittsburgh, Pennsylvania |
| 7:00 p.m. EDT | Rovira (yellow card) 54'; Griffin (yellow card) 75'; Peters (yellow card) 90+1' | Report | Barrera (yellow card) 16'; Cardona (yellow card) 28'; Boudadi (yellow card) 43'; Obregón Jr. (yellow card) 57'; Caldwell (yellow card) 90'; Martinez (yellow card) 90+1' | Stadium: Highmark Stadium; Attendance: 3,532; Referee: Kevin Broadley |

== See also ==
- Hartford Athletic
- 2021 in American soccer
- 2021 USL Championship season
