= 2019 New York Red Bulls season =

New York Red Bulls
2019 season
- Sporting director: Denis Hamlett
- Head coach: Chris Armas
- Major League Soccer: Conference: 6th Overall: 12th
- MLS Cup playoffs: First round
- U.S. Open Cup: Fourth round
- CONCACAF Champions League: Quarter-finals
- Top goalscorer: League: Daniel Royer (11 goals); All: Daniel Royer (14 goals)
- Highest home attendance: 20,128
- Lowest home attendance: 11,115
- Average home league attendance: 17,279
Home colors	Away colors

The 2019 New York Red Bulls season was the club's twenty-fourth season in Major League Soccer, the top division of soccer in the United States.

== Team information ==
=== Squad information ===
As of October 20, 2019

Appearances and goals are career totals from all-competitions.

Squad No.	Name	Nationality	Position(s)	Date of birth (age)	Signed from	Games played	Goals scored
Goalkeepers
18	Ryan Meara	(United States)	GK	November 15, 1990 (aged 28)	(United States) Fordham University	40	0
24	Evan Louro	(United States)	GK	January 19, 1996 (aged 23)	Academy	0	0
31	Luis Robles (Captain)	(United States)	GK	May 11, 1984 (aged 35)	(Germany) Karlsruher SC	281	0
Defenders
3	Amro Tarek	(Egypt)	CB/LB	May 17, 1992 (aged 27)	(United States) Orlando City SC	21	1
5	Connor Lade	(United States)	RB/LB	November 16, 1989 (aged 29)	Academy	153	5
6	Kyle Duncan	(United States)	RB	December 27, 1997 (aged 21)	(France) Valenciennes	20	1
15	Sean Nealis	(United States)	CB	January 22, 1997 (aged 22)	(United States) Hofstra University	10	1
26	Tim Parker	(United States)	CB	February 23, 1993 (aged 26)	(Canada) Vancouver Whitecaps FC	75	3
33	Aaron Long	(United States)	CB	October 12, 1992 (aged 27)	(United States) New York Red Bulls II	118	7
62	Michael Amir Murillo	(Panama)	RB/CB	February 11, 1996 (aged 23)	(Panama) San Francisco	80	4
91	Rece Buckmaster	(United States)	LB	July 11, 1996 (aged 23)	(United States) New York Red Bulls II	8	0
92	Kemar Lawrence	(Jamaica)	LB	September 17, 1992 (aged 27)	(Jamaica) Harbour View	146	5
Midfielders
8	Jean-Christophe Koffi	(Ivory Coast)	CM	January 5, 1998 (aged 21)	(United States) D.C. United	0	0
10	Kaku	(Paraguay)	CM	January 11, 1995 (aged 24)	(Argentina) Huracán	70	12
17	Ben Mines	(United States)	CM	May 12, 2000 (aged 19)	Academy	1	1
19	Alex Muyl	(United States)	RW/LW	September 30, 1995 (aged 24)	Academy	138	13
20	Josh Sims	(England)	RW	March 28, 1997 (aged 22)	(England) Southampton (on loan)	8	1
21	Omir Fernandez	(United States)	RW/LW	February 8, 1999 (aged 20)	Academy	21	3
22	Florian Valot	(France)	CM	February 13, 1993 (aged 26)	(United States) New York Red Bulls II	23	3
23	Cristian Cásseres	(Venezuela)	CM	January 20, 2000 (aged 19)	(Venezuela) Deportivo La Guaira	28	4
27	Sean Davis	(United States)	CM	February 8, 1993 (aged 26)	Academy	158	7
77	Daniel Royer	(Austria)	RW/LW	May 22, 1990 (aged 29)	(Denmark) FC Midtjylland	119	46
88	Vincent Bezecourt	(France)	CM	June 10, 1993 (aged 26)	(United States) New York Red Bulls II	22	1
90	Marc Rzatkowski	(Germany)	CM	March 2, 1990 (aged 29)	(Austria) Red Bull Salzburg	65	5
Forwards
25	Mathias Jørgensen	(Denmark)	FW	September 20, 2000 (aged 19)	(Denmark) Odense Boldklub	6	0
42	Brian White	(United States)	FW	February 3, 1996 (aged 23)	(United States) New York Red Bulls II	27	10
74	Tom Barlow	(United States)	FW	July 8, 1995 (aged 24)	(United States) New York Red Bulls II	14	5
99	Bradley Wright-Phillips	(England)	FW	March 12, 1985 (aged 34)	(England) Charlton Athletic	240	126

== Roster transactions ==
=== In ===
#	Pos.	Player	Signed from	Details	Date	Source
3	DF	(Egypt) Amro Tarek	(United States) Orlando City SC	2019 MLS SuperDraft 4th Round Pick	December 11, 2018	
11	MF	(United States) Marcus Epps	(United States) Philadelphia Union	2018 MLS Waiver Draft	December 12, 2018	
90	MF	(Germany) Marc Rzatkowski	(Austria) Red Bull Salzburg	Free Transfer	January 24, 2019	
21	MF	(United States) Omir Fernandez	Academy	Homegrown contract	January 26, 2019	
25	FW	(Denmark) Mathias Jørgensen	(Denmark) Odense Boldklub	$2,500,000	February 12, 2019	
15	DF	(United States) Sean Nealis	(United States) Hofstra University	Draft Pick	February 17, 2019	
74	FW	(United States) Tom Barlow	(United States) New York Red Bulls II	Free Transfer	May 8, 2019	
91	DF	(United States) Rece Buckmaster	(United States) New York Red Bulls II	Free Transfer	August 3, 2019	
20	MF	(England) Josh Sims	(England) Southampton	Loan until December 2019	August 7, 2019	

=== Out ===
#	Pos.	Player	Signed by	Details	Date	Source
3	DF	(United States) Kevin Politz	(United States) Greenville Triumph	Option Declined	December 4, 2018	
41	DF	(United States) Ethan Kutler	(United States) Pittsburgh Riverhounds	Option Declined	December 4, 2018	
78	DF	(France) Aurélien Collin	(United States) Philadelphia Union	Option Declined	December 4, 2018	
11	FW	(Colombia) Carlos Rivas	(Colombia) Atletico Nacional	Option Declined	December 4, 2018	
21	DF	(United States) Tommy Redding	Free Agent	Contract Expired	December 4, 2018	
29	DF	(Panama) Fidel Escobar	(Panama) Sporting San Miguelito	End of loan	December 4, 2018	
90	MF	(Germany) Marc Rzatkowski (Note: Following the conclusion of Rzatkowski's loan he re-signed with the club on January 24, 2019.)	(Austria) Red Bull Salzburg	End of loan	December 4, 2018	
47	DF	(Cameroon) Hassan Ndam	(United States) FC Cincinnati	Expansion Draft	December 11, 2018	
4	MF	(United States) Tyler Adams	(Germany) RB Leipzig	$3,000,000	January 1, 2019	
16	FW	(Cameroon) Anatole Abang	(China) Nantong Zhiyun	Undisclosed	February 21, 2019	
11	FW	(United States) Marcus Epps	(United States) Memphis 901 FC	Loan until December 2019	August 2, 2019	
7	MF	(Haiti) Derrick Etienne	(United States) FC Cincinnati	Loan until December 2019	August 8, 2019	
9	MF	(Romania) Andreas Ivan	Free Agent	Waived	August 14, 2019	

Total expenditure: $2,500,000

Total revenue: $3,000,000

Net income: ▲$500,000

=== Draft picks ===
Round	Position	Player	College	Reference
1 (16)	DF	(Ghana) Roy Boateng	UC Davis	
1 (22)	FW	(Germany) Janos Loebe	Fordham	
2 (1)	DF	(United States) Sean Nealis	Hofstra	
2 (8)	DF	(United States) Rece Buckmaster	Indiana	
3 (22)	GK	(Ghana) Rashid Nuhu	Fordham	
4 (6)	MF	(United States) Sean McSherry	Princeton	
4 (12)	MF	(United States) Joey Piatczyc	West Virginia	

== Preseason and Friendlies ==
=== Preseason ===
January 26	New York Red Bulls	2–1	IF Elfsborg	Bradenton, Florida
11:00 a.m. EST	Royer 80', 90' (pen.)	Report	Cibicki 59' (pen.)	Stadium: IMG Academy

January 30	New York Red Bulls	2–3	Philadelphia Union	Clearwater, Florida
3:00 p.m. EST	Muyl 82' (pen.); Tarek 86'	Report	Burke 25'; Picault 48'; Fontana 72'	Stadium: Joe DiMaggio Sports Complex

February 2	Orlando City SC	1–1	New York Red Bulls	Bradenton, Florida
10:30 a.m. EST	Méndez 26' (pen.)		Fernandez 56'	Stadium: IMG Academy

February 10	Phoenix Rising	1–5	New York Red Bulls	Oro Valley, Arizona
	Spencer 42'		Wright-Phillips 6', 38', 63'; Kaku 40'; Muyl 56'	Stadium: Naranja Park

February 16	Portland Timbers	2–2	New York Red Bulls	Tucson, Arizona
9:00 p.m. EST	Ebobisse 62'; Valeri 70' (pen.)	Report	White 13'; Nealis 32'	Stadium: Kino Sports Complex

February 20	Phoenix Rising	2–5	New York Red Bulls	Tucson, Arizona
6:00 p.m. EST	Johnson 29'; Calistri 67'		De Sousa 32'; Stroud 47'; Valot 49'; Barlow 52'; Elney 81'	Stadium: Kino Sports Complex

February 23	New York Red Bulls	1–2	FC Dallas	Tucson, Arizona
3:00 p.m. EST	Lema 22'		Aránguiz 34' (pen.); Ferreira 77'	Stadium: Kino Sports Complex

== Major League Soccer season ==
=== Eastern Conference ===
2019 MLS Eastern Conference standings
Pos	Team	Pld	W	L	T	GF	GA	GD	Pts	Qualification
1	New York City FC	34	18	6	10	63	42	+21	64	MLS Cup Conference Semifinals
2	Atlanta United FC	34	18	12	4	58	43	+15	58	MLS Cup First Round
3	Philadelphia Union	34	16	11	7	58	50	+8	55	MLS Cup First Round
4	Toronto FC	34	13	10	11	57	52	+5	50	MLS Cup First Round
5	D.C. United	34	13	10	11	42	38	+4	50	MLS Cup First Round
6	New York Red Bulls	34	14	14	6	53	51	+2	48	MLS Cup First Round
7	New England Revolution	34	11	11	12	50	57	−7	45	MLS Cup First Round
8	Chicago Fire	34	10	12	12	55	47	+8	42	
9	Montreal Impact	34	12	17	5	47	60	−13	41	
10	Columbus Crew SC	34	10	16	8	39	47	−8	38	
11	Orlando City SC	34	9	15	10	44	52	−8	37	
12	FC Cincinnati	34	6	22	6	31	75	−44	24	

Source: MLS
Rules for classification: 1) points; 2) total wins; 3) total goal differential; 4) total goals scored; 5) disciplinary points; 6) away goal differential; 7) away goals scored; 8) home goals scored; 9) home goal differential; 10) coin toss or drawing of lots.

=== Overall ===
2019 MLS regular season standings
Pos	Team	Pld	W	L	T	GF	GA	GD	Pts
10	D.C. United	34	13	10	11	42	38	+4	50
11	Portland Timbers	34	14	13	7	52	49	+3	49
12	New York Red Bulls	34	14	14	6	53	51	+2	48
13	FC Dallas	34	13	12	9	54	46	+8	48
14	New England Revolution	34	11	11	12	50	57	−7	45

Source: MLS
Rules for classification: 1) points; 2) total wins; 3) total goal differential; 4) total goals scored; 5) disciplinary points; 6) away goals scored; 7) away goal differential; 8) coin toss or drawing of lots

=== Results summary ===
Overall								Home						Away					
Pld	W	D	L	GF	GA	GD	Pts	W	D	L	GF	GA	GD	W	D	L	GF	GA	GD
34	14	6	14	53	51	+2	48	9	3	5	29	18	+11	5	3	9	24	33	−9

=== Matches ===
March 2 1	Columbus Crew	1–1	New York Red Bulls	Columbus, Ohio
4:30 p.m. EST	Sauro 41'	Report	Ivan 6'	Stadium: Mapfre Stadium; Attendance: 17,931; Referee: Ted Unkel

March 16 2	New York Red Bulls	4–1	San Jose Earthquakes	Harrison, New Jersey
3:30 p.m. EST	Muyl 51', 71'; Wright-Phillips 85'; Royer 89'	Report	Espinoza 5'	Stadium: Red Bull Arena; Attendance: 15,621; Referee: Rubiel Vazquez

March 23 3	New York Red Bulls	0–1	Orlando City SC	Harrison, New Jersey
7:00 p.m. EST		Report	Kljestan 73'	Stadium: Red Bull Arena; Attendance: 15,108; Referee: Allen Chapman

March 30 4	Chicago Fire	1–0	New York Red Bulls	Bridgeview, Illinois
1:00 p.m. EST	Parker 48' (o.g.)	Report		Stadium: SeatGeek Stadium; Attendance: 12,013; Referee: Alex Chilowicz

April 6 5	New York Red Bulls	1–2	Minnesota United FC	Harrison, New Jersey
7:00 p.m. EST	Cásseres 70'	Report	Danladi 34'; Rodríguez 50'	Stadium: Red Bull Arena; Attendance: 15,706; Referee: Joseph Dickerson

April 14 6	Sporting Kansas City	2–2	New York Red Bulls	Kansas City, Kansas
7:00 p.m. EST	Russell 24'; Busio 88'	Report	Royer 52'; White 75'; Kaku (red card) 90+4'	Stadium: Children's Mercy Park; Attendance: 17,897; Referee: Robert Sibiga

April 20 7	New England Revolution	1–0	New York Red Bulls	Foxborough, Massachusetts
7:30 p.m. EST	Penilla 73'	Report		Stadium: Gillette Stadium; Attendance: 14,514; Referee: Drew Fischer

April 27 8	New York Red Bulls	1–0	FC Cincinnati	Harrison, New Jersey
7:00 p.m. EST	Lade 38'	Report		Stadium: Red Bull Arena; Attendance: 16,848; Referee: Timothy Ford

May 4 9	New York Red Bulls	3–2	LA Galaxy	Harrison, New Jersey
2:00 p.m. EST	Tarek 15'; Rzatkowski 59'; Etienne 67'	Report	Antuna 39'; Ibrahimović 43'	Stadium: Red Bull Arena; Attendance: 20,128; Referee: Nima Saghafi

May 8 10	New York Red Bulls	1–2	Montreal Impact	Harrison, New Jersey
8:00 p.m. EST	Long 36'	Report	Diallo 64'; Urruti 79' (pen.)	Stadium: Red Bull Arena; Attendance: 11,115; Referee: Alex Chilowicz

May 11 11	FC Dallas	1–3	New York Red Bulls	Frisco, Texas
2:00 p.m. EST	Ferreira 45+2'	Report	Cásseres 12'; Nealis 58'; White 85'	Stadium: Toyota Stadium; Attendance: 12,263; Referee: Drew Fischer

May 19 12	New York Red Bulls	1–0	Atlanta United FC	Harrison, New Jersey
5:00 p.m. EST	Parker (red card) 35'; Barlow 65'	Report		Stadium: Red Bull Arena; Attendance: 18,495; Referee: Robert Sibiga

May 22 13	New York Red Bulls	2–2	Vancouver Whitecaps FC	Harrison, New Jersey
8:00 p.m. EST	White 37'; Rose 55' (o.g.)	Report	Sutter 29'; Montero 61' (pen.)	Stadium: Red Bull Arena; Attendance: 13,035; Referee: Victor Rivas

May 25 14	FC Cincinnati	0–2	New York Red Bulls	Cincinnati, Ohio
7:30 p.m. EST		Report	Kaku 78'; Fernandez 90+1'	Stadium: Nippert Stadium; Attendance: 28,290; Referee: Fotis Bazakos

June 1 15	New York Red Bulls	4–0	Real Salt Lake	Harrison, New Jersey
7:00 p.m. EST	Silva 58' (o.g.); Royer 59'; Murillo 64'; Fernandez 83'	Report		Stadium: Red Bull Arena; Referee: Armando Villarreal

June 8 16	Philadelphia Union	3–2	New York Red Bulls	Chester, Pennsylvania
7:30 p.m. EST	Monteiro 60'; Ilsinho 61', 72'	Report	Kaku 29'; White 42'	Stadium: Talen Energy Stadium; Attendance: 18,767; Referee: Kevin Stott

June 28 17	New York Red Bulls	3–1	Chicago Fire	Harrison, New Jersey
8:00 p.m. EST	Kaku 8'; White 59'; Royer 90+3'	Report	Nikolić 81'	Stadium: Red Bull Arena; Attendance: 17,563; Referee: Ted Unkel

July 3 18	Houston Dynamo	4–0	New York Red Bulls	Houston, Texas
9:00 p.m. EST	Manotas 39'; Tomás Martínez 56'; Elis 72', 90+4'; Figueroa (red card) 90+4'	Report	Murillo (red card) 83'; Kaku (red card) 90+4'	Stadium: BBVA Compass Stadium; Attendance: 19,531; Referee: Baldomero Toledo

July 7 19	Atlanta United FC	3–3	New York Red Bulls	Atlanta, Georgia
2:00 p.m. EST	Meram 10'; Martínez 79' (pen.), 90+1'	Report	Royer 37'; White 60'; Wright-Phillips 90+3'	Stadium: Mercedes-Benz Stadium; Attendance: 68,077; Referee: Kevin Stott

July 14 20	New York Red Bulls	2–1	New York City FC	Harrison, New Jersey
6:30 p.m. EST	Royer 45+1' (pen.), 60'	Report	Héber 7'	Stadium: Red Bull Arena; Attendance: 20,128; Referee: Alan Kelly

July 17 21	Toronto FC	3–1	New York Red Bulls	Toronto, Ontario
8:00 p.m. EST	Altidore 6'; Pozuelo 26' (pen.); Morgan 72'	Report	Barlow 63'	Stadium: BMO Field; Attendance: 24,462

July 21 22	Orlando City SC	0–1	New York Red Bulls	Orlando, Florida
7:30 p.m. EST		Report	White 32'	Stadium: Exploria Stadium; Attendance: 22,408; Referee: Armando Villarreal

July 27 23	New York Red Bulls	2–3	Columbus Crew	Harrison, New Jersey
8:00 p.m. EST	White 15'; Royer 63' (pen.)	Report	Argudo 16'; Santos 46', 84'	Stadium: Red Bull Arena; Attendance: 16,126; Referee: Fotis Bazakos

August 3 24	New York Red Bulls	2–0	Toronto FC	Harrison, New Jersey
6:00 p.m. EST	Mavinga 56' (o.g.); Lawrence 90+1'	Report	Morrow (red card) 90+4'	Stadium: Red Bull Arena; Attendance: 20,128; Referee: Jair Marrufo

August 11 25	Los Angeles FC	4–2	New York Red Bulls	Los Angeles, California
10:00 p.m. EST	Harvey 23'; Blessing 25'; Vela 61' (pen.); Segura 72'	Report	Cásseres 42'; White 45'	Stadium: Banc of California Stadium; Attendance: 22,342; Referee: Drew Fischer

August 17 26	New York Red Bulls	1–1	New England Revolution	Harrison, New Jersey
7:00 p.m. EST	Rzatkowski 18'	Report	Bou 65'	Stadium: Red Bull Arena; Attendance: 18,177; Referee: Chris Penso

August 21 27	D.C. United	1–2	New York Red Bulls	Washington, D.C.
8:00 p.m. EST	Rooney (red card) 24'; Kamara 55'	Report	Kaku 6'; Tarek (red card) 45+3'; Royer 59' (pen.)	Stadium: Audi Field; Attendance: 18,302; Referee: Ismail Elfath

August 24 28	New York City FC	2–1	New York Red Bulls	New York, New York
7:00 p.m. EST	Moralez 43' (pen.); Héber 53'; Matarrita (red card) 90+3'	Report	Muyl 10'	Stadium: Yankee Stadium; Attendance: 28,895; Referee: Kevin Stott

August 31 29	New York Red Bulls	0–2	Colorado Rapids	Harrison, New Jersey
7:00 p.m. EST		Report	Lewis 14', 87'	Stadium: Red Bull Arena; Attendance: 17,089; Referee: Rubiel Vazquez

September 15 30	Seattle Sounders FC	4–2	New York Red Bulls	Seattle, Washington
6:00 p.m. EST	Morris 2'; Lodeiro 23', 90+4'; Davis 83' (o.g.)	Report	Long 27'; Kaku 67'	Stadium: Century Link Field; Attendance: 37,722

September 18 31	Portland Timbers	0–2	New York Red Bulls	Portland, Oregon
10:30 p.m. EST		Report	Duncan 3'; Royer 90+6' (pen.)	Stadium: Providence Park; Attendance: 25,218; Referee: Alan Kelly

September 22 32	New York Red Bulls	2–0	Philadelphia Union	Harrison, New Jersey
6:00 p.m. EST	Barlow 32'; Royer 90+6'	Report		Stadium: Red Bull Arena; Attendance: 19,262; Referee: Jair Marrufo

September 29 33	New York Red Bulls	0–0	D.C. United	Harrison, New Jersey
5:00 p.m. EST	Cásseres (yellow card) 33'	Report	Rooney (yellow card) 77'	Stadium: Red Bull Arena; Attendance: 20,118; Referee: Ramy Touchan

October 6 34	Montreal Impact	3–0	New York Red Bulls	Montreal, Quebec
4:00 p.m. EST	Bojan 23'; Urruti 37'; Okwonkwo 62', (yellow card) 64'	Report		Stadium: Stade Saputo; Attendance: 15,022; Referee: Nima Saghafi

== MLS Cup Playoffs ==
October 20 Round 1	Philadelphia Union	4–3 (a.e.t.)	New York Red Bulls	Chester, Pennsylvania
3:00 p.m. EST	Bedoya 30'; Elliott 52'; Picault 78'; Fabián 105+1'	Report	Sims 6'; Parker 24'; Barlow 45+4'	Stadium: Talen Energy Stadium; Attendance: 18,530

== U.S. Open Cup ==
New York will enter the 2019 U.S. Open Cup with the rest of Major League Soccer in the fourth round.

June 11 Fourth round	New York Red Bulls	2–3	New England Revolution	Montclair, New Jersey
7:30 p.m. EST	Barlow 19'; Cásseres 54'	Report	Agudelo 2'; Bunbury 85', 109'; Caicedo (red card) 90+5'	Stadium: MSU Soccer Park; Attendance: 2,185; Referee: Rosendo Mendoza

== CONCACAF Champions League ==
=== Round of 16 ===
February 20 First Leg	Atlético Pantoja (Dominican Republic)	0–2	(United States) New York Red Bulls	Santo Domingo
8:00 p.m. EST		Report	Innocent 39' (o.g.); Royer 67'	Stadium: Estadio Olímpico Félix Sánchez; Referee: Ismael Cornejo (El Salvador)

February 27 Second Leg	New York Red Bulls (United States)	3–0 (5–0 agg.)	(Dominican Republic) Atlético Pantoja	Harrison, New Jersey
8:00 p.m. EST	Davis 27'; Royer 32' (pen.); Ivan 75'	Report		Stadium: Red Bull Arena; Referee: John Pitti (Panama)

=== Quarter-finals ===
March 5 First Leg	New York Red Bulls (United States)	0–2	(Mexico) Santos Laguna	Harrison, New Jersey
8:00 p.m. EST		Report	Valdes 42'; Furch 47'	Stadium: Red Bull Arena; Referee: Saíd Martínez (Honduras)

March 12 Second Leg	Santos Laguna (Mexico)	4–2 (6–2 agg.)	(United States) New York Red Bulls	Torreón, Mexico
9:00 p.m. EST	Abella 72'; Lozano 76', 81'; Valdes 79'	Report	Fernandez 4'; Royer 9'	Stadium: Estadio Corona; Referee: John Pitti (Panama)

== Competitions summary ==
As of October 20, 2019.

Competition	Record							
Competition	G	W	D	L	GF	GA	GD	Win %
MLS Regular Season	34	14	6	14	53	51	+2	41.18
MLS Cup Playoffs	1	0	0	1	3	4	−1	0.00
U.S. Open Cup	1	0	0	1	2	3	−1	0.00
Champions League	4	2	0	2	7	6	+1	50.00
Total	40	16	6	18	65	64	+1	40.00

== Player statistics ==
As of October 20, 2019.

No.	Pos	Nat	Player	Total		MLS		MLS Cup		U.S. Open Cup		Champions League	
No.	Pos	Nat	Player	Apps	Goals	Apps	Goals	Apps	Goals	Apps	Goals	Apps	Goals
Goalkeepers
18	GK	(United States) USA	Ryan Meara	2	-4	1	-1	0	0	1	-3	0	0
24	GK	(United States) USA	Evan Louro	0	0	0	0	0	0	0	0	0	0
31	GK	(United States) USA	Luis Robles	38	-60	33	-50	1	-4	0	0	4	-6
Defenders
3	DF	(Egypt) EGY	Amro Tarek	21	1	19+1	1	0	0	1	0	0	0
5	DF	(United States) USA	Connor Lade	16	1	10+1	1	0	0	0+1	0	4	0
6	DF	(United States) USA	Kyle Duncan	16	1	13	1	0	0	1	0	1+1	0
15	DF	(United States) USA	Sean Nealis	10	1	3+6	1	0	0	0	0	0+1	0
26	DF	(United States) USA	Tim Parker	37	1	26+5	0	1	1	1	0	4	0
33	DF	(United States) USA	Aaron Long	29	2	24	2	1	0	0	0	4	0
62	DF	(Panama) PAN	Michael Amir Murillo	25	1	18+4	1	0	0	0	0	3	0
91	DF	(United States) USA	Rece Buckmaster	8	0	6	0	1	0	1	0	0	0
92	DF	(Jamaica) JAM	Kemar Lawrence	24	1	19+3	1	1	0	0	0	0+1	0
Midfielders
8	MF	(Ivory Coast) CIV	Jean-Christophe Koffi	0	0	0	0	0	0	0	0	0	0
10	MF	(Paraguay) PAR	Kaku	32	5	21+5	5	1	0	0+1	0	4	0
17	MF	(United States) USA	Ben Mines	0	0	0	0	0	0	0	0	0	0
19	MF	(United States) USA	Alex Muyl	29	3	18+6	3	0+1	0	1	0	3	0
20	MF	(England) ENG	Josh Sims	8	1	5+2	0	1	1	0	0	0	0
21	MF	(United States) USA	Omir Fernandez	21	3	3+15	2	0	0	1	0	1+1	1
22	MF	(France) FRA	Florian Valot	3	0	2	0	0	0	0	0	1	0
23	MF	(Venezuela) VEN	Cristian Cásseres	25	4	21+2	3	1	0	1	1	0	0
27	MF	(United States) USA	Sean Davis	36	1	28+2	0	0+1	0	1	0	4	1
77	MF	(Austria) AUT	Daniel Royer	37	14	26+5	11	1	0	0+1	0	4	3
88	MF	(France) FRA	Vincent Bezecourt	8	0	7+1	0	0	0	0	0	0	0
90	MF	(Germany) GER	Marc Rzatkowski	32	2	26+2	2	1	0	0	0	3	0
Forwards
25	FW	(Denmark) DEN	Mathias Jørgensen	6	0	1+4	0	0	0	0	0	0+1	0
42	FW	(United States) USA	Brian White	21	9	17+2	9	0+1	0	0	0	0+1	0
74	FW	(United States) USA	Tom Barlow	14	5	8+4	3	1	1	1	1	0	0
99	FW	(England) ENG	Bradley Wright-Phillips	29	2	9+15	2	0+1	0	0	0	4	0
Left Club During Season
7	MF	(Haiti) HAI	Derrick Etienne	13	1	5+6	1	0	0	0	0	0+2	0
9	MF	(Romania) ROU	Andreas Ivan	16	2	5+7	1	0	0	1	0	0+3	1
11	MF	(United States) USA	Marcus Epps	3	0	1+2	0	0	0	0	0	0	0

=== Top scorers ===
Place	Position	Number	Name	MLS	MLS Cup	U.S. Open Cup	Champions League	Total
1	MF	77	(Austria) Daniel Royer	11	0	0	3	14
2	FW	42	(United States) Brian White	9	0	0	0	9
3	MF	10	(Paraguay) Kaku	5	0	0	0	5
3	FW	74	(United States) Tom Barlow	3	1	1	0	5
4	MF	23	(Venezuela) Cristian Cásseres	3	0	1	0	4
5	MF	19	(United States) Alex Muyl	3	0	0	0	3
5	MF	21	(United States) Omir Fernandez	2	0	0	1	3
6	MF	9	(Romania) Andreas Ivan	1	0	0	1	2
6	DF	33	(United States) Aaron Long	2	0	0	0	2
6	MF	90	(Germany) Marc Rzatkowski	2	0	0	0	2
6	FW	99	(England) Bradley Wright-Phillips	2	0	0	0	2
7	DF	3	(Egypt) Amro Tarek	1	0	0	0	1
7	DF	5	(United States) Connor Lade	1	0	0	0	1
7	DF	6	(United States) Kyle Duncan	1	0	0	0	1
7	MF	7	(Haiti) Derrick Etienne	1	0	0	0	1
7	DF	15	(United States) Sean Nealis	1	0	0	0	1
7	MF	20	(England) Josh Sims	0	1	0	0	1
7	DF	26	(United States) Tim Parker	0	1	0	0	1
7	MF	27	(United States) Sean Davis	0	0	0	1	1
7	DF	62	(Panama) Michael Amir Murillo	1	0	0	0	1
7	DF	92	(Jamaica) Kemar Lawrence	1	0	0	0	1
Own goals				3	0	0	1	4
Total				53	3	2	7	65

As of October 20, 2019.

=== Assist Leaders ===
Place	Position	Number	Name	MLS	MLS Cup	U.S. Open Cup	Champions League	Total
1	MF	77	(Austria) Daniel Royer	7	1	0	1	9
2	MF	10	(Paraguay) Kaku	4	1	0	1	6
3	MF	23	(Venezuela) Cristian Cásseres	3	0	0	0	3
3	DF	62	(Panama) Michael Amir Murillo	3	0	0	0	3
3	MF	90	(Germany) Marc Rzatkowski	3	0	0	0	3
4	DF	6	(United States) Kyle Duncan	2	0	0	0	2
4	MF	9	(Romania) Andreas Ivan	2	0	0	0	2
4	MF	19	(United States) Alex Muyl	2	0	0	0	2
4	MF	21	(United States) Omir Fernandez	1	0	1	0	2
4	MF	27	(United States) Sean Davis	1	0	1	0	2
4	FW	99	(England) Bradley Wright-Phillips	1	0	0	1	2
5	DF	3	(Egypt) Amro Tarek	1	0	0	0	1
5	DF	5	(United States) Connor Lade	1	0	0	0	1
5	MF	7	(Haiti) Derrick Etienne	1	0	0	0	1
5	MF	20	(England) Josh Sims	1	0	0	0	1
5	MF	22	(France) Florian Valot	1	0	0	0	1
5	FW	42	(United States) Brian White	1	0	0	0	1
Total				35	2	2	3	40

As of October 20, 2019.
This table does not include secondary assists.

=== Shutouts ===
Place	Position	Number	Name	MLS	MLS Cup	U.S. Open Cup	Champions League	Total
1	GK	31	(United States) Luis Robles	9	0	0	2	11
Total				9	0	0	2	11

As of October 20, 2019.

=== Disciplinary record ===
No.	Pos.	Nat.	Player	MLS		MLS Cup		U.S. Open Cup		Champions League		Total	
No.	Pos.	Nat.	Player	Booked	Sent off (straight red)	Booked	Sent off (straight red)	Booked	Sent off (straight red)	Booked	Sent off (straight red)	Booked	Sent off (straight red)
3	DF	(Egypt)	Amro Tarek	5	1	0	0	1	0	0	0	6	1
5	DF	(United States)	Connor Lade	0	0	0	0	0	0	1	0	1	0
6	DF	(United States)	Kyle Duncan	4	0	0	0	0	0	0	0	4	0
10	MF	(Paraguay)	Kaku	0	2	0	0	0	0	1	0	1	2
15	DF	(United States)	Sean Nealis	1	0	0	0	0	0	0	0	1	0
19	MF	(United States)	Alex Muyl	4	0	0	0	0	0	1	0	5	0
23	MF	(Venezuela)	Cristian Cásseres	5	0	1	0	0	0	0	0	6	0
25	FW	(Denmark)	Mathias Jørgensen	1	0	0	0	0	0	0	0	1	0
26	DF	(United States)	Tim Parker	5	1	1	0	0	0	0	0	6	1
31	GK	(United States)	Luis Robles	4	0	0	0	0	0	0	0	4	0
33	DF	(United States)	Aaron Long	3	0	0	0	0	0	0	0	3	0
42	FW	(United States)	Brian White	1	0	0	0	0	0	0	0	1	0
62	DF	(Panama)	Michael Amir Murillo	5	1	0	0	0	0	2	0	7	1
77	MF	(Austria)	Daniel Royer	1	0	0	0	0	0	0	0	1	0
90	MF	(Germany)	Marc Rzatkowski	4	0	0	0	0	0	1	0	5	0
91	DF	(United States)	Rece Buckmaster	1	0	0	0	0	0	0	0	1	0
92	DF	(Jamaica)	Kemar Lawrence	5	0	0	0	0	0	0	0	5	0
99	FW	(England)	Bradley Wright-Phillips	3	0	0	0	0	0	1	0	4	0
Totals				51	5	2	0	1	0	7	0	61	5

As of October 20, 2019.
