= Mac Steeves =

American soccer player

Personal information
- Date of birth: July 31, 1994 (age 32)
- Place of birth: Needham, Massachusetts, United States
- Height: 6 ft 4 in (1.93 m)
- Position: Forward

Youth career
- 2002–2013: FC Boston Bolts

College career
Years	Team	Apps	(Gls)
2013–2017	Providence Friars	73	(35)

Senior career*
Years	Team	Apps	(Gls)
2016	FC Boston	3	(1)
2018	Houston Dynamo	3	(0)
2018	→ Rio Grande Valley FC (loan)	2	(0)
2019–2020	Hartford Athletic	15	(2)
- * Club domestic league appearances and goals as of October 5, 2020

Mac Steeves (born July 31, 1994) is an American professional soccer player who plays as a forward.

== Career ==
=== Youth and college ===
Steeves played for the Needham High School soccer team for four years and served as the captain for his final two years. During his senior season, Steeves led Needham to the 2012 Division I State Championship, scoring the winning goal in the final. He was also named the 2012 Gatorade Player of the Year for the state of Massachusetts.

Steeves spent all four years of his college career at Providence College between 2014 and 2017, scoring 35 goals and tallying 12 assists in 73 appearances. Some of the honors Steeves received while playing for the Friars include All-Big East First Team in 2015 and 2017, All-Big East Second Team in 2014, and the College Cup Most Outstanding Offensive Player in 2014. When he left school, he had the second most goals in Providence history.

Steeves also played for FC Boston in the USL Premier Development League during their 2016 season.

=== Professional ===
On January 19, 2018, Steeves was selected 43rd overall in the 2018 MLS SuperDraft by Houston Dynamo. He signed with Houston on February 28, 2018. He would make his MLS and Dynamo debut on March 31, coming on as a sub in a 2–0 defeat to the New England Revolution. Steeves was loaned to the Dynamo's USL affiliate, Rio Grande Valley, to get more game time. However at the end of May he suffered a hip injury that forced him to miss the rest of the year. Steeves was released by Houston at the end of their 2018 season.

On January 17, 2019, Steeves joined USL Championship side Hartford Athletic ahead of their inaugural season. He made his debut for Hartford on March 9, coming on as a sub in a 2–0 loss to Atlanta United 2. On April 27, Steeves picked up his first assist for Hartford in a 4–1 loss to North Carolina FC. On May 4, Hartford played their first home match in club history when they hosted Charlotte Independence. Charlotte struck first, but Steeves quickly answered by scoring his first goal for the club as he chipped the keeper. Hartford would hold on for the 1–1 draw, the first point in club history. On July 17, Steves scored his second goal for Hartford in a 3–4 loss to Swope Park Rangers. He re-signed with Hartford for the 2020 season on January 15, 2020. He did not make any appearances during the 2020 season

== Career statistics ==
As of January 24, 2021

Club	Season	League			Playoffs		Cup		Continental		Total	
Club	Season	Division	Apps	Goals	Apps	Goals	Apps	Goals	Apps	Goals	Apps	Goals
FC Boston	2016	PDL	3	1	—		—		—		3	1
Houston Dynamo	2018	MLS	3	0	—		0	0	—		3	0
Rio Grande Valley FC (loan)	2018	USL	2	0	—		—		—		2	0
Hartford Athletic	2019	USL Championship	15	2	—		1	0	—		16	2
Hartford Athletic	2020	USL Championship	0	0	0	0	0	0	—		0	0
Hartford Athletic	Hartford Total		15	2	0	0	1	0	0	0	15	0
Career total			23	3	0	0	1	0	0	0	24	3

== Personal life ==
Steeves was born and raised in Needham, Massachusetts. His parents, Jay and Maura, also have two daughters. Steeves attended Needham High School, where he played on the school soccer team.

== Honors ==
Houston Dynamo

- U.S. Open Cup: 2018
