= Omir Fernandez =

American soccer player (born 1999)

- Fernández with the Portland Timbers in 2026

Personal information
- Full name: Omir Guadalupe Fernandez Mosso
- Date of birth: February 8, 1999 (age 27)
- Place of birth: The Bronx, New York, United States
- Height: 5 ft 7 in (1.70 m)
- Positions: Attacking midfielder; winger

Team information
- Current team: Portland Timbers
- Number: 22

Youth career
- 2011–2016: New York Red Bulls

College career
Years	Team	Apps	(Gls)
2017–2018	Wake Forest	44	(18)

Senior career*
Years	Team	Apps	(Gls)
2016	New York Red Bulls II	1	(0)
2018	New York Red Bulls U-23	4	(5)
2019–2023	New York Red Bulls	112	(15)
2019–2021	→ New York Red Bulls II (loan)	4	(0)
2024–2025	Colorado Rapids	41	(2)
2025–	Portland Timbers	18	(1)
- * Club domestic league appearances and goals as of January 21, 2026

Omir Guadalupe Fernandez Mosso (born February 8, 1999) is an American professional soccer player who plays as an attacking midfielder and winger for Major League Soccer club Portland Timbers.

== Career ==
=== Youth and college ===
Fernandez attended Columbia Secondary School in Manhattan, and played for the New York Red Bulls Academy and made one appearance for the New York Red Bulls II team in 2016. Fernandez was a three star college recruit by TopDrawer soccer, and the number 26 recruit for the class of 2017 nationwide, and number 2 in New Jersey. He ultimately chose to play for Wake Forest over North Carolina, Virginia, Loyola Maryland, and Columbia. During his freshman year, he was a super-sub playing in 23 matches, but coming off the bench for all matches. He notched six goals and five assists during the 2017 campaign, scoring his first goal against Louisville on September 9, 2017. In his sophomore season, he became a starter playing in 21 matches, and scored 12 goals and 6 assists. During his college years Fernandez also played for the New York Red Bulls U-23 team.

=== Professional ===
On January 26, 2019, Fernandez signed his first professional contract with New York Red Bulls. On February 20, 2019, he made his professional and New York Red Bulls debut coming on in the 74th minute for Alex Muyl in 2–0 victory in a 2019 CONCACAF Champions League fixture at Atlético Pantoja. On March 2, 2019, Fernandez made his league debut with the club, appearing as a starter in a 1–1 draw with Columbus Crew on the opening day of the season. On March 12, 2019, Omir scored his first professional goal in a 4–2 defeat to Mexican side Santos Laguna in a CONCACAF Champions League match in Torreon, Mexico. On May 25, 2019, Fernandez scored his first league goal in a 2–0 victory over FC Cincinnati at Nippert Stadium.

On August 29, 2020, Omir scored his first goal of the season in a 1–1 draw with New England Revolution at Gillette Stadium. On October 7, 2020, he scored for New York in a 1–2 loss against Inter Miami FC. Omir scored his first goal of the 2021 season in a 4-0 road victory over Inter Miami FC. He continued his good form scoring the winning goal for New York on September 25, 2021, in a 1–0 victory in the Hudson River Derby over rival New York City FC at Yankee Stadium.

On February 26, 2022, Fernandez scored the winning goal for New York in a 3–1 victory over San Jose Earthquakes in the opening match of the season. On June 22, 2022, Fernandez helped New York to advance to the semifinals of the 2022 U.S. Open Cup, scoring a goal in a 3–0 victory over local rival New York City FC.

On May 9, 2023, Fernandez scored the lone goal for New York in 1–0 victory over rival DC United, helping his side advance to the Round of 16 of the 2023 U.S. Open Cup. A few days later, on May 13, Fernandez scored another game winner in a 1–0 victory over New York rival New York City FC. On August 3, 2023, Fernandez scored the lone goal for New York, a 31st minute pk, in a 1–0 victory over New York City FC in a Leagues Cup match, helping his club advance to the round of 16. On September 23, 2023, Fernandez recorded his first multi goal game as a professional, in a 5–3 victory over D.C. United.

On December 20, 2023, it was announced that Fernandez had signed a two-year deal with Colorado Rapids as a free agent.

Fernandez was traded to Portland Timbers on April 18, 2025 in exchange for up to $250,000 in General Allocation Money. He scored his only goal of the season in the final minute against Minnesota United on July 19th, rescuing an important draw for the team.

== Personal life ==
Born in the United States to Mexican parents, Fernandez holds a U.S. and Mexican citizenship.

== Career statistics ==
=== Club ===
As of January 21, 2026

Club	Season	League			National cup		Continental		Other		Total	
Club	Season	Division	Apps	Goals	Apps	Goals	Apps	Goals	Apps	Goals	Apps	Goals
New York Red Bulls II	2016	USL	1	0	—		—		—		1	0
New York Red Bulls U-23	2018	PDL	4	5	—		—		1 (Note: Appearance in USL PDL Playoffs)	0	5	5
New York Red Bulls	2019	MLS	18	2	1	0	2 (Note: Appearances in CONCACAF Champions League)	1	—		21	3
New York Red Bulls	2020	MLS	15	2	—		—		—		15	2
New York Red Bulls	2021	MLS	22	3	—		—		1 (Note: Appearance(s) in MLS Cup Playoffs)	0	23	3
New York Red Bulls	2022	MLS	27	2	5	1	—		1	0	33	3
New York Red Bulls	2023	MLS	30	6	1	1	4 (Note: Appearances in Leagues Cup)	1	3	0	38	8
New York Red Bulls	Total		112	15	7	2	6	2	5	0	130	19
New York Red Bulls II	2019	USL	2	0	—		—		—		2	0
New York Red Bulls II	2020	USL	1	0	—		—		—		1	0
New York Red Bulls II	2021	USL	1	0	—		—		—		1	0
New York Red Bulls II	Total		4	0	—		—		—		4	0
Colorado Rapids	2024	MLS	33	2	—		—		8	0	41	2
Colorado Rapids	2025	MLS	8	0	—		0	0	0	0	0	0
Colorado Rapids	Total		41	2	—		0	0	8	0	49	2
Portland Timbers	2025	MLS	18	1	2	0	—		2	0	22	1
Portland Timbers	2026	MLS	0	0	—		—		0	0	0	0
Portland Timbers	Total		18	1	2	0	—		2	0	22	1
Career total			175	23	9	2	6	2	2	0	211	27
