= Daniel Royer =

Austrian footballer (born 1990)

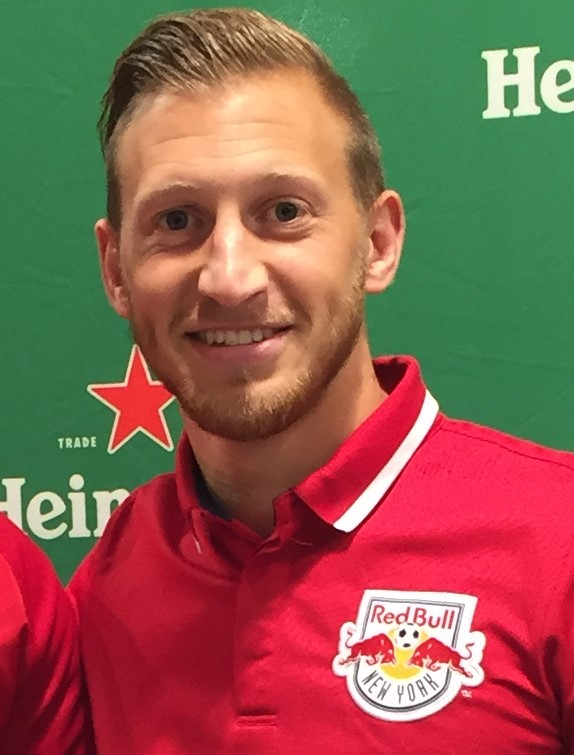
- Royer with the New York Red Bulls in 2016

Personal information
- Date of birth: 22 May 1990 (age 36)
- Place of birth: Schladming, Austria
- Height: 1.75 m (5 ft 9 in)
- Position: Winger

Youth career
- 1996–2004: Schladming
- 2004–2007: Sturm Graz

Senior career*
Years	Team	Apps	(Gls)
2009–2010	Pasching	25	(6)
2010–2011	Ried	41	(4)
2011–2013	Hannover 96	3	(0)
2012–2013	→ 1. FC Köln (loan)	26	(3)
2013–2015	Austria Wien	63	(11)
2015–2016	FC Midtjylland	23	(2)
2016–2021	New York Red Bulls	127	(39)

International career^{‡}
2010	Austria U21	9	(3)
2011	Austria	6	(0)
- * Club domestic league appearances and goals as of 19 November 2021 ‡ National team caps and goals as of 17 October 2013

Daniel Royer (born 22 May 1990) is a former Austrian professional footballer who played as a winger.

== Early career ==
Royer began his career as a youth player at FC Schladming in Upper Styria, where he was active from 1996 to 2004. In 2004, he moved to Sturm Graz. He quickly moved up the club's youth system and played for the club's reserve team during the 2008–09 season making twelve appearances and scoring two goals. Royer joined Regionalliga team FC Pasching during the 2009–10 season. In his one season at the club, he appeared in 25 league matches scoring six goals. After impressing with Pasching, Royer began to receive interest from Austrian Bundesliga clubs.

== Club career ==
=== Ried ===
Royer signed with Ried in 2010. On 10 October 2010 he scored his first goal for Ried in a 3–0 victory over LASK. The following match day, on 6 November, Royer scored the winning goal for Ried in a 2–1 victory over Austria Wien. He ended his first season at the club capturing the Austrian Cup. Royer began his second season with Ried before transferring to German club Hannover 96 on 31 August, the last day of the transfer window.

=== Hannover 96 ===
Royer made his debut in the German Bundesliga on 24 September 2011 against FC Augsburg. He came on in the 88th minute for Sérgio Pinto in the match that ended in a goalless draw. During the 2011–12 season Royer also played for Hannover 96 II.

=== Köln ===
For the 2012–13 season Royer was sent on loan to 1. FC Köln. On 26 August 2012, Royer he scored his first goal for Köln in a 3–3 draw with Kaiserslautern. In his one year at the club Royer was a regular for Köln as he appeared in 26 league matches and scored three goals.

=== Austria Wien ===
On 24 June 2013, Royer returned to Austria, signing with Austria Wien. He scored his first goal for Austria Wien on 25 August 2013 opening the scoring for his club in a 4–1 victory over Wolfsberger AC. Royer was an important player for Wien, in his two seasons at the club he made 76 appearances, scoring fourteen goals.

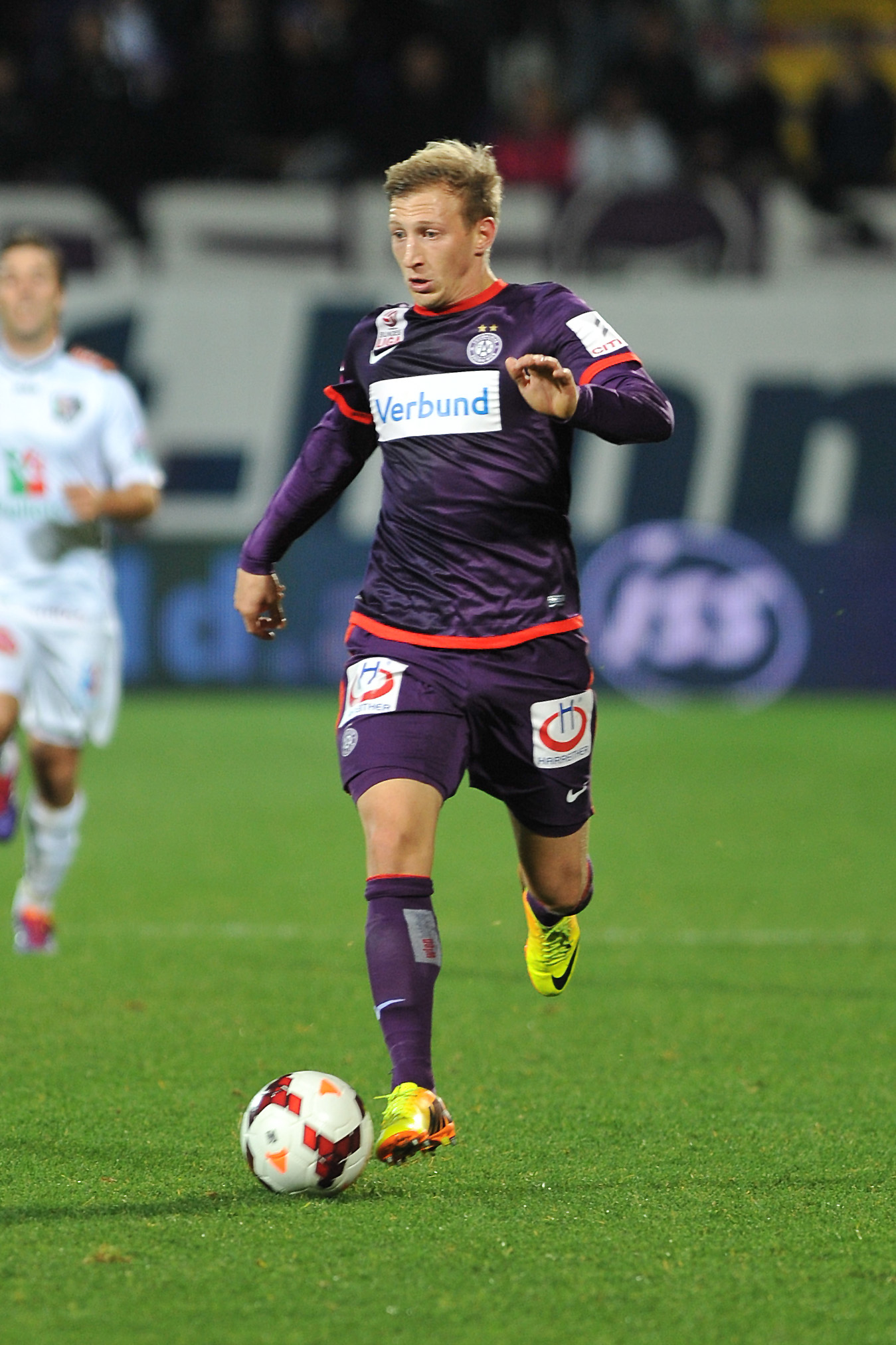
Royer playing for Austria Wien in 2013

=== Midtjylland ===
On 22 May 2015, Danish champions Midtjylland announced the signing of Royer. Royer scored his first goal with Midtjylland on 10 August 2015 in a 2–0 league victory over AaB. During the 2015–16 season he appeared in 36 matches scoring two goals across the Superliga, Champions League qualifying, and Europa League.

=== New York Red Bulls ===
On 3 August 2016, Royer signed with New York Red Bulls. On 21 August 2016, he made his New York Red Bulls debut at RFK Stadium against D.C. United in a 2–2 draw. He scored his first goal with the club on 24 September 2016 in a 1–0 victory; heading in the winning goal against the Montreal Impact.

On 27 May 2017, Royer scored the game-winning goal in a 2–1 victory over New England Revolution. On 14 June 2017, he scored the lone goal for New York in a 1–0 victory over rival New York City FC in the 2017 Lamar Hunt U.S. Open Cup. On 19 July 2017, he recorded his first multi-goal game for New York, scoring twice in a 5–1 victory over San Jose Earthquakes. Three days later, Royer scored the opening goal and assisted on another in helping New York to a 3–0 victory over Minnesota United, earning him MLS Player of the Week honors. On 29 July 2017, he scored another two goals for New York in a 4–0 rout over Montreal Impact.

On 22 February 2018, Royer scored New York's lone goal in a 1–1 draw against CD Olimpia in the first leg of the round of 16 match of the CONCACAF Champions League. On 28 April 2018, he scored his first league goal of the season, helping New York to a 3–2 victory over Los Angeles Galaxy. On 6 June 2018, he scored a brace in two minutes to cap off New York's 4–0 derby win over New York City FC in the fourth round of the 2018 Lamar Hunt U.S. Open Cup. On 11 November 2018, Royer scored a brace to lift New York to a 3–0 playoff victory against Columbus Crew, sending New York to the eastern conference finals.

On November 8, 2019, Royer was named the New York Red Bulls team MVP for 2019 after leading the team in goals and assists throughout the season.

Following the 2021 season, New York declined their contract option on Royer.

== International career ==
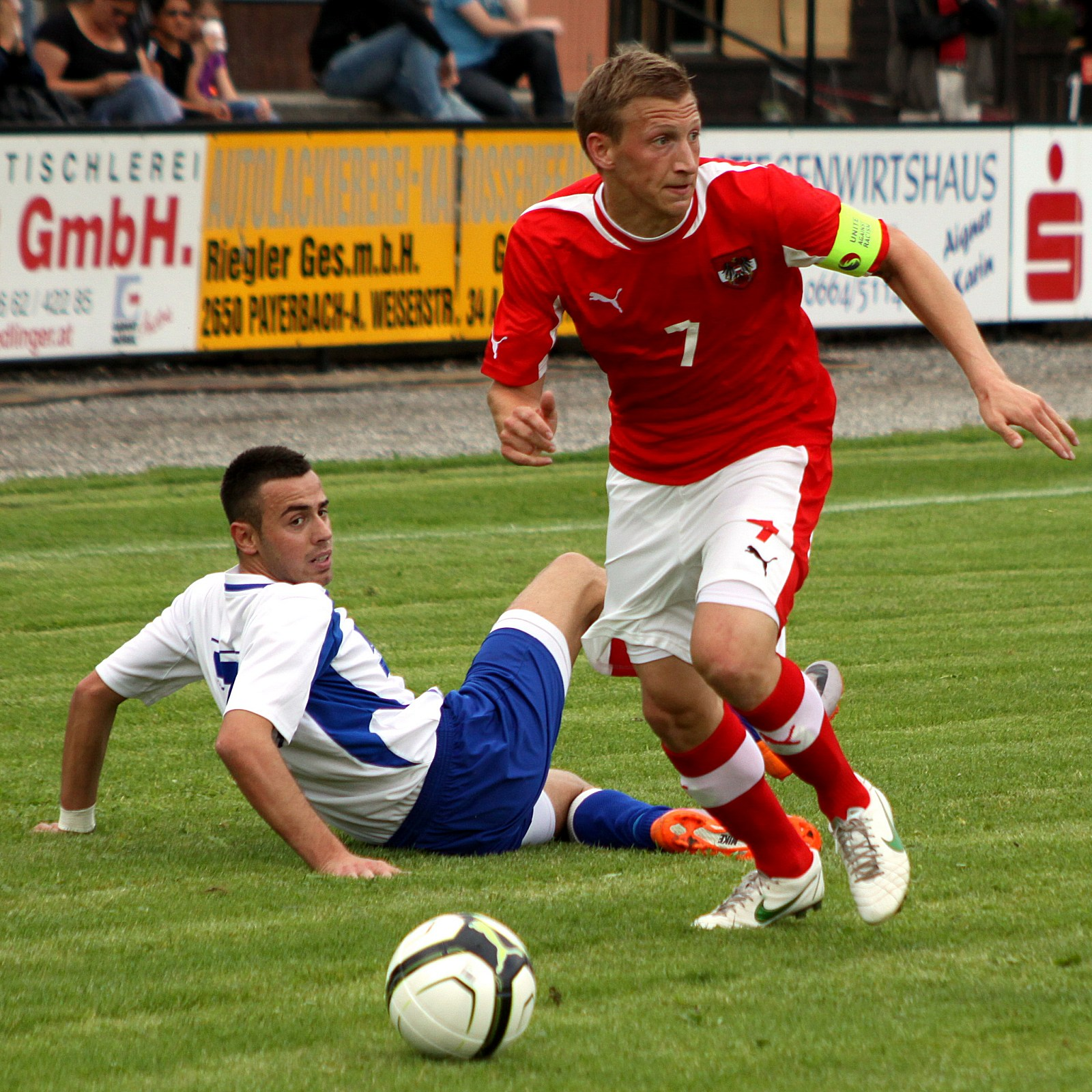

Royer has represented Austria serving as captain of the under-21 team appearing in 9 matches and scoring three goals.

On 19 May 2011, he was called up to the full national team by Dietmar Constantini. He made his first appearance for the national team on 3 June 2011 coming on as a second-half substitute for Martin Harnik in a European Championship qualifier against Germany.

== Career statistics ==
As of match played 19 November 2021

Appearances and goals by club, season and competition
Club	Season	League			Playoffs		National Cup		Continental		Total	
Club	Season	Division	Apps	Goals	Apps	Goals	Apps	Goals	Apps	Goals	Apps	Goals
Sturm Graz (A)	2008–09	Regionalliga Central	12	2	—		0	0	—		12	2
FC Pasching	2009–10	Regionalliga Central	25	6	—		2	0	—		27	6
Ried	2010–11	Austrian Bundesliga	35	4	—		6	1	—		41	5
Ried	2011–12	Austrian Bundesliga	6	0	—		0	0	4 (Note: Appearances in the UEFA Europa League.)	2	10	2
Ried	Total		41	4	—		6	1	4	2	51	7
Hannover 96	2011–12	Bundesliga	3	0	—		0	0	0	0	3	0
Hannover II	2011–12	Regionalliga Nord	11	0	—		—		—		11	0
1. FC Köln (loan)	2012–13	2. Bundesliga	26	3	—		3	0	—		29	3
Austria Wien	2013–14	Austrian Bundesliga	30	6	—		1	0	10 (Note: Appearances in the UEFA Champions League.)	1	41	7
Austria Wien	2014–15	Austrian Bundesliga	33	5	—		3	2	—		36	7
Austria Wien	Total		63	11	—		4	2	10	1	77	14
FC Midtjylland	2015–16	Danish Superliga	23	2	—		1	0	12 (Note: Appearances in the UEFA Champions League and UEFA Europa League.)	0	36	2
New York Red Bulls	2016	MLS	6	1	1	0	0	0	0	0	7	1
New York Red Bulls	2017	MLS	26	12	3	2	3	1	2 (Note: Appearances in the CONCACAF Champions League.)	0	34	15
New York Red Bulls	2018	MLS	29	11	4	2	2	2	6	1	41	16
New York Red Bulls	2019	MLS	31	11	1	0	1	0	4	3	37	14
New York Red Bulls	2020	MLS	20	4	1	0	—		—		21	4
New York Red Bulls	2021	MLS	15	0	0	0	1	0	—		16	0
New York Red Bulls	Total		127	39	10	4	7	3	12	4	156	50
Career Total			331	67	10	4	23	6	38	7	402	84

== Honours ==
Ried

- Austrian Cup : 2010–11

New York Red Bulls

- MLS Supporters' Shield: 2018
