= Caden Clark =

American soccer player (born 2003)

Personal information
- Full name: Caden Christopher Clark
- Date of birth: May 27, 2003 (age 23)
- Place of birth: Medina, Minnesota, U.S.
- Height: 5 ft 11 in (1.80 m)
- Positions: Attacking midfielder; winger

Team information
- Current team: Seattle Sounders FC
- Number: 8

Youth career
- 2015–2017: Minnesota Thunder
- 2017–2020: Barça Residency Academy

Senior career*
Years	Team	Apps	(Gls)
2020	New York Red Bulls II	12	(3)
2020–2021	New York Red Bulls	15	(6)
2021–2023	RB Leipzig	0	(0)
2021–2022	→ New York Red Bulls (loan)	32	(1)
2022	→ New York Red Bulls II (loan)	5	(1)
2023	→ Vendsyssel (loan)	2	(0)
2024	Minnesota United	23	(0)
2024	→ Minnesota United 2 (loan)	1	(0)
2024–2025	CF Montréal	35	(4)
2025–2026	D.C. United	4	(0)
2026–	Seattle Sounders FC	1	(1)

International career^{‡}
2021–2022	United States U20	12	(3)
2025–	United States	2	(1)
- * Club domestic league appearances and goals as of October 24, 2025 ‡ National team caps and goals as of January 22, 2025

Caden Christopher Clark (born May 27, 2003) is an American professional soccer player who plays as an attacking midfielder or winger for Major League Soccer club Seattle Sounders FC and the United States national team.

== Club career ==
=== Early career ===
Born in Medina, Minnesota, Clark began his career with the youth setup of Minnesota Thunder in 2015. He also played for the FC Barcelona-sponsored Barça Residency Academy in Arizona. Clark went on a brief trial with Minnesota United in 2019, getting to know several players as well as then-head coach Adrian Heath.

=== New York Red Bulls II ===
In February 2020, Clark was signed by USL Championship club New York Red Bulls II. He made his league debut for the club on July 17, 2020, against Hartford Athletic and scored his first goal on August 29, 2020, against Loudoun United FC.

=== New York Red Bulls ===
On October 10, 2020, New York Red Bulls acquired his MLS rights from Minnesota United in exchange for $75,000 of General Allocation Money, and he was signed to New York's first team roster. Clark made his debut for New York Red Bulls and scored against Atlanta United on October 10, 2020, during a 1–0 win for the club, becoming the fifth youngest player to score in MLS. He followed up with a game tying goal from outside the box in his second appearance for the Red Bulls, after he entered the game as a sub in the second half and secured a point for the Red Bulls against Toronto FC on October 14, 2020, becoming the youngest player to score in his first two MLS games. On December 21, 2020, Clark was named New York Red Bulls Newcomer of the Year for the 2020 season.

Clark underwent an appendectomy in June 2021, causing him to miss a month of action. He ended his first full season with New York scoring 4 goals in 24 league matches.

=== RB Leipzig ===
On June 24, 2021, it was announced that Clark would move to Bundesliga side RB Leipzig, but would remain with New York on loan until the conclusion of the 2021 MLS season.

==== Loan return to New York Red Bulls ====
On February 9, 2022, he returned to the Red Bulls for the 2022 MLS season, with an option to extend the loan. Clark scored his first goal of the season on August 27, 2022, in a 3–1 victory against Inter Miami.

==== Loan to Vendsyssel FF ====
On September 1, 2023 it was confirmed, that Clark had been loaned out to Danish 1st Division side Vendsyssel FF for the rest of 2023.

=== Minnesota United ===
On September 7, 2023, it was announced that Minnesota United had signed Clark from 1 January 2024.

=== CF Montréal ===
On August 8, 2024, Clark was traded to CF Montréal in exchange for $50,000 in 2024 General Allocation Money and a second-round pick in the 2025 MLS SuperDraft.

=== DC United ===
On August 21, 2025, Clark was traded to D.C. United in exchange for $700,000, with the potential for D.C. to pay an additional $100,000 should Clark meet certain performance incentives and Montreal retains a future sell-on percentage.

=== Seattle Sounders FC ===
Clark was acquired by Seattle Sounders FC in a trade for a second-round pick in the 2028 MLS SuperDraft and $50,000 in general allocation money on September 3, 2026. He remained a U-22 Initiative player and other costs above the designation's base salary were covered by D.C. United as part of the deal. Clark was sent to reserve team Tacoma Defiance and made his first appearance on September 13.

== Personal life ==
Clark is of distant Austro-Hungarian descent through his mother.

== Career statistics ==
=== Club ===
As of October 19, 2025

Club	Season	League			Playoffs		National cup		Continental		Other		Total	
Club	Season	Division	Apps	Goals	Apps	Goals	Apps	Goals	Apps	Goals	Apps	Goals	Apps	Goals
New York Red Bulls II	2020	USL	12	3	–		–		–		–		12	3
New York Red Bulls	2020	MLS	7	2	1	1	–		–		–		8	3
New York Red Bulls	2021	MLS	8	4	–		–		–		–		8	4
New York Red Bulls	Total		15	6	1	1	–		–		–		16	7
RB Leipzig	2021–22	Bundesliga	0	0	–		–		–		–		0	0
RB Leipzig	2022–23	Bundesliga	0	0	–		–		–		–		0	0
RB Leipzig	Total		0	0	–		–		–		–		0	0
New York Red Bulls (loan)	2021	MLS	16	0	1	0	–		–		–		17	0
New York Red Bulls (loan)	2022	MLS	16	1	–		1	0	–		–		17	1
New York Red Bulls (loan)	Total		32	1	1	0	1	0	–		–		34	1
New York Red Bulls II (loan)	2022	USL	5	1	–		–		–		–		5	1
Vendsyssel (loan)	2023–24	1.Division	2	0	–		–		–		–		2	0
Minnesota United	2024	MLS	23	0	–		–		–		–		23	0
Minnesota United FC 2 (loan)	2024	MLS Next Pro	1	0	–		–		–		–		1	0
CF Montréal	2024	MLS	9	4	1	0	–		–		–		10	4
CF Montréal	2025	MLS	26	0	–		2	0	–		3 (Note: Appearances in Leagues Cup)	0	31	0
CF Montréal	Total		35	4	1	0	2	0	–		3	0	41	4
D.C. United	2025	MLS	4	0	–		–		–		–		4	0
Career total			129	15	3	1	3	0	0	0	3	0	138	16

=== International ===
As of match played January 22, 2025

Appearances and goals by national team and year
National team	Year	Apps	Goals
United States	2025	2	1
Total		2	1

List of international goals scored by Caden Clark
No.	Date	Venue	Cap	Opponent	Score	Result	Competition
1	January 22, 2025	Inter&Co Stadium, Orlando, United States	2	Costa Rica	2–0	3–0	Friendly

== Honors ==
United States U20

- CONCACAF U-20 Championship: 2022
