= Kevin Saucedo =

Colombian footballer (born 2000)

Personal information
- Full name: Kevin Saucedo Mosquera
- Date of birth: 28 February 2000 (age 26)
- Place of birth: Quibdó, Colombia
- Height: 1.91 m (6 ft 3 in)
- Position: Defender

Team information
- Current team: Jaguares de Córdoba
- Number: 2

Youth career
- –2020: Millonarios

Senior career*
Years	Team	Apps	(Gls)
2021	Real Monarchs	19	(0)
2021–2022	Botafogo FC	5	(0)
2023	Deportivo Cali	5	(0)
2025–	Jaguares de Córdoba	2	(0)

International career^{‡}
2019	Colombia U20		
- * Club domestic league appearances and goals as of 15 February 2025 ‡ National team caps and goals as of 5 July 2021

Kevin Saucedo Mosquera (born 28 February 2000) is a Colombian professional footballer who plays as a defender for Jaguares de Córdoba.

== Club career ==
Saucdeo was part of the academy before joining USL Championship side Real Monarchs on 16 December 2020 ahead of their 2021 season. He debuted for Real Monarchs on 26 May 2021, starting in a 2–0 loss to Austin Bold.
