= Mitchell Budler =

American soccer player (born 2003)

Personal information
- Date of birth: January 3, 2003 (age 23)
- Place of birth: Lincoln, Nebraska, United States
- Height: 1.88 m (6 ft 2 in)
- Position: Goalkeeper

Team information
- Current team: Akron Zips

Youth career
- 2016–2019: Shattuck-Saint Mary's
- 2019–2020: Philadelphia Union

College career
Years	Team	Apps	(Gls)
2021–	Akron Zips		

Senior career*
Years	Team	Apps	(Gls)
2020	Philadelphia Union II	6	(0)
- * Club domestic league appearances and goals as of October 6, 2020

Mitchell Budler (born January 3, 2003) is an American soccer player who plays as a goalkeeper for Akron Zips.

== Career ==
=== Philadelphia Union II ===
In August 2019, Budler joined the Philadelphia Union academy. He made his competitive debut on 22 July 2020, playing for Philadelphia Union II in a 5–1 defeat to New York Red Bulls II.
