= Idan Cohen (footballer) =

Israeli footballer

Personal information
- Date of birth: May 1, 1996 (age 30)
- Place of birth: United States
- Height: 5 ft 8 in (1.73 m)
- Position: Right-back

Team information
- Current team: Hapoel Petah Tikva
- Number: 20

Youth career
- –2012: Hakoah Amidar Ramat Gan
- 2012–2015: Hapoel Tel Aviv

Senior career*
Years	Team	Apps	(Gls)
2015–2020	Hapoel Tel Aviv	71	(3)
2015	→ Hapoel Rishon LeZion (loan)	10	(0)
2016–2017	→ Beitar Tel Aviv Ramla (loan)	19	(0)
2020	Hartford Athletic	7	(0)
2021–2022	Hapoel Ramat Gan	34	(0)
2022–2023	Maccabi Petah Tikva	19	(0)
2024–2025	Hapoel Ramat HaSharon	40	(0)
2025–	Hapoel Petah Tikva	37	(0)

International career
2011–2012	Israel U16	12	(1)
2012–2013	Israel U17	15	(0)
2013–2014	Israel U18	5	(0)
2013–2014	Israel U19	7	(0)
2018–2019	Israel U21	1	(0)
- * Club domestic league appearances and goals as of 23 June 2026

Idan Cohen (Hebrew: עידן כהן; born January 6, 1996) is a footballer who plays for Hapoel Petah Tikva. Born in the United States, he has represented Israel at youth level.

== Early life ==
Cohen was born in United States to an Israeli Jewish family, and he immigrated with them back to Israel when he was two years old. After 6 years, they had returned to the U.S., and when he was eleven years old they family finally settled in Ramat Gan, Israel.

== Professional career ==
Cohen had played with Israeli club Hapoel Tel Aviv U19 team before making his debut with the senior team in 2015. He made 75 appearances with the team between 2015 and the end of the 2019-2020 Israeli Premier League season. He signed with American second division team Hartford Athletic on September 4, 2020. In June 2021, Cohen signed with Israeli second division club Hapoel Ramat Gan Givatayim F.C.

== International career ==
Cohen played for the Israeli U19, U18, U17 and U16 teams, making 41 total appearances with the various youth national teams.
