= Alfonso Vazquez =

American soccer player

Personal information
- Full name: Alfonso Vazquez Villar
- Date of birth: June 16, 2002 (age 24)
- Place of birth: Windham, Connecticut, United States
- Height: 5 ft 7 in (1.70 m)
- Position: Forward

Youth career
- 2016–2019: Windham High School

Senior career*
Years	Team	Apps	(Gls)
2020–2021	Hartford Athletic	9	(1)
- * Club domestic league appearances and goals as of October 31, 2021

Alfonso Vazquez Villar (born June 16, 2002) is an American professional soccer player who plays as a forward.

== Career ==
=== High school ===
Vazquez holds Connecticut's all-time high school goal scoring record. He broke a 31-year-old state record for goals scored in a career. Vazquez scored 21 goals as a freshman, 31 as a sophomore, 42 as a junior, and 55 as a senior to bring his career total to 149 goals. He was named All-New England and All-American following his senior season, is a four-time first-team all Eastern Connecticut Conference player, and a three-time all-state honoree.

=== Professional ===
Following an open tryout, Vazquez was signed by USL Championship side Hartford Athletic. At the age of 17, he was the club's youngest-ever signing. He made his professional debut on July 25, 2020, appearing as an 87th-minute substitute in a 3–2 win over Philadelphia Union II. He scored his first goal for Hartford Athletic on August 2, 2020, in a 4–1 win vs. Loudoun United.

Vazquez re-signed with Hartford for the 2021 season on December 17, 2020.
