= Noah Paravicini =

American soccer player

Personal information
- Full name: Noah Tiberius Paravicini
- Date of birth: April 10, 1997 (age 29)
- Place of birth: Houston, Texas, U.S.
- Height: 6 ft 2 in (1.88 m)
- Position: Midfielder

Youth career
- Marin FC

College career
Years	Team	Apps	(Gls)
2015–2018	Dartmouth Big Green	67	(8)

Senior career*
Years	Team	Apps	(Gls)
2015–2016	Sonoma County Sol		
2017	Seacoast United Phantoms	0	(0)
2019	Ventura County Fusion	0	(0)
2019	Napa Valley 1839	1	(0)
2020	Hartford Athletic	0	(0)
2021	Charlotte Independence	11	(0)
- * Club domestic league appearances and goals as of November 4, 2021

Noah Tiberius Paravicini (born April 10, 1997) is an American retired professional soccer player who last played for Charlotte Independence in the USL Championship.

== Career ==
=== Youth, college and amateur ===
Paravicini played youth soccer with Marin FC 97 Blue, where he won a NorCal State Cup, five NorCal Premier League championships and made the finals of two Surf Cups. In 2015, Paravicini went to play college soccer at Dartmouth College, where he made 67 appearances over 4 seasons with the Big Green. During his time at Dartmouth, Paravicini scored 8 goals, tallied 8 assists and was named Second Team All-Ivy in both 2016 and 2017.

Whilst at Dartmouth, Paravicini also played for NPSL side Sonoma County Sol in 2015 and 2016, and for USL PDL side Seacoast United Phantoms in 2017.

Following college, Paravicini spent time with USL League Two side Ventura County Fusion in 2019, but didn't appear for the team. Later in the year Paravicini played in the NPSL Founders Cup in 2019 with Napa Valley 1839.

=== Professional ===
On December 18, 2019, it was announced Paravicini had signed with USL Championship side Hartford Athletic ahead of their 2020 season. He sustained a season-ending injury and did not appear for the team.

On April 16, 2021, Paravicini joined USL Championship side Charlotte Independence following a trial with the club. He made his professional debut on May 1, 2021, appearing as a 62nd–minute substitute during a 3–0 loss to Tampa Bay Rowdies.

== Personal ==
Paravicini's father was born in Argentina but grew up in Venezuela. Paravicini also holds a Swiss passport.
