= Roy Boateng =

Ghanaian footballer (born 1996)

Personal information
- Date of birth: January 21, 1996 (age 30)
- Place of birth: Accra, Ghana
- Height: 1.88 m (6 ft 2 in)
- Position: Defender

College career
Years	Team	Apps	(Gls)
2015–2018	UC Davis Aggies	82	(6)

Senior career*
Years	Team	Apps	(Gls)
2016–2017	Portland Timbers U23s	7	(0)
2018	San Francisco Glens	2	(0)
2019–2020	New York Red Bulls II	11	(1)
2021	FC Motown	3+	(0+)
- * Club domestic league appearances and goals as of July 25, 2022

Roy Boateng (born 21 January 1996) is a Ghanaian former footballer who played as a defender.

== Career ==
=== Youth and college ===
Boateng was born in Accra, Ghana, and moved to Rohnert Park, California, at the age of eight. He attended Rancho Cotate High School in Rohnert Park, where he was a four-year letterwinner as a forward on the soccer team in addition to playing basketball and American football as a sophomore. However, his senior season was cut prematurely due to injury.

Boateng played four years of college soccer at the University of California, Davis between 2015 and 2018, making 82 appearances for the Aggies, scoring six goals and tallying one assist. He was converted to a defender by Aggies head coach Dwayne Shaffer, who redshirted him in 2014 so he could learn the position from senior Ramón Martín del Campo. Boateng was named the Big West Conference Defensive Player of the Year in both his junior and senior seasons.

While at college, Boateng appeared for USL PDL side Portland Timbers U23s in both 2016 and 2017, and San Francisco Glens in 2018.

=== New York Red Bulls II ===
On January 11, 2019, Boateng was drafted 16th overall in the 2019 MLS SuperDraft by New York Red Bulls. He signed for the Red Bull's USL Championship side New York Red Bulls II on March 8, 2019. He was released by Red Bulls II on November 30, 2020.
