= Danny Barrera =

American soccer player (born 1990)

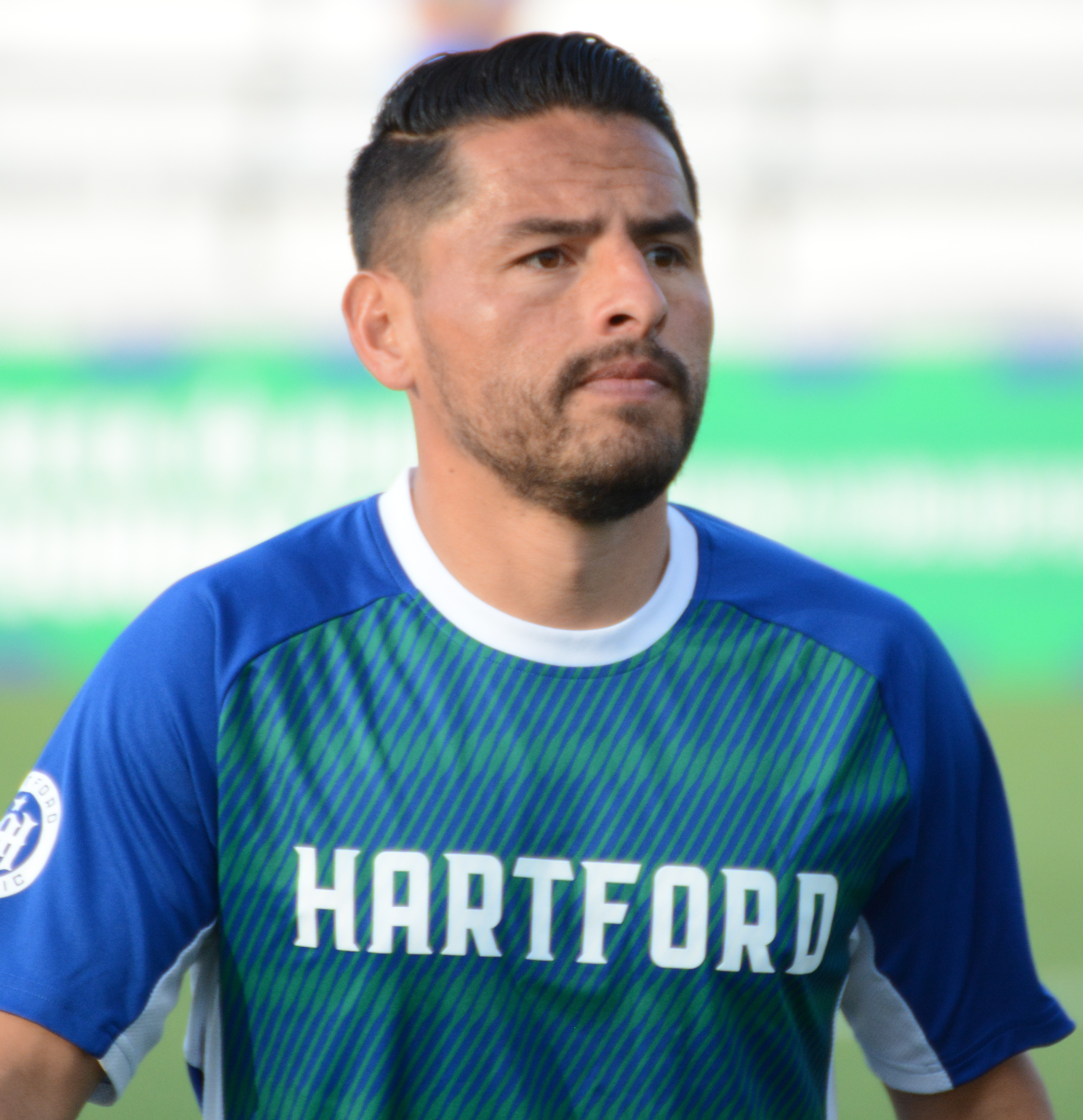
- Barrera with Hartford Athletic in 2021

Personal information
- Full name: Daniel Francisco Barrera
- Date of birth: January 8, 1990 (age 36)
- Place of birth: Bogotá, Colombia
- Height: 5 ft 6 in (1.68 m)
- Position: Midfielder

Youth career
- Westlake High School

College career
Years	Team	Apps	(Gls)
2008–2010	UC Santa Barbara Gauchos	66	(10)

Senior career*
Years	Team	Apps	(Gls)
2008–2011	Ventura County Fusion	39	(13)
2011–2012	Spartak Subotica	1	(0)
2012	Ventura County Fusion	6	(0)
2012	Cal FC		
2012–2013	Atlanta Silverbacks	31	(5)
2014	San Antonio Scorpions	13	(1)
2014	Carolina RailHawks	10	(1)
2015	Cal FC	0	(0)
2015–2017	Sacramento Republic	62	(6)
2018	Fresno FC	33	(1)
2019	Cal FC	0	(0)
2019–2024	Hartford Athletic	150	(18)
2026	Hartford Athletic II	12	(1)

International career^{‡}
2006	United States U17	3	(1)
2007	United States U18	4	(0)
- * Club domestic league appearances and goals as of June 21, 2026 ‡ National team caps and goals as of October 11, 2016

Daniel Francisco Barrera (born January 8, 1990) is a former professional soccer player and the current head coach of Hartford Athletic women. Born in Bogotá, Colombia, Barrera moved to the United States at the age of eight, growing up in Thousand Oaks, California. He developed his skills both in the United States Soccer residency program and at the high school level with Westlake High School, where he was named a Parade magazine All-American and regarded as one of the top recruits coming out of high school. He was the #1 recruit in his class according to RiseMag.com.

Barrera attended the University of California, Santa Barbara, where he played college soccer with the UC Santa Barbara Gauchos men's soccer team from 2008 to 2010. He left UCSB after his junior year to pursue a professional career and has since played for various clubs, including Ventura County Fusion, FK Spartak Subotica, Atlanta Silverbacks, San Antonio Scorpions, Carolina RailHawks, Sacramento Republic FC, Fresno FC, and Hartford Athletic. Notably, Barrera was named to the USL All-League Team in 2016 and was included in the USL Championship's All-Time Hispanic Team in 2021. Internationally, he represented the United States at the U17 and U18 levels and was part of the USA team at the 2007 Pan-American Games.

== Early life and education ==
Born in Bogotá, Colombia, Barrera moved to the United States at the age of eight, growing up in Thousand Oaks, California. He trained with Sheffield United F.C. as a teen. He developed his game in the United States both with the US Soccer residency program and at the high school level with Westlake High School, where he skipped his senior year of high school. He was named as a Parade magazine All-American and regarded as one of the top recruits coming out of high school. RiseMag.com listed Barrera as the #1 recruit in his class.

He attended the University of California, Santa Barbara where he was a student-athlete and played college soccer with the UC Santa Barbara Gauchos men's soccer team from 2008 to 2010. He would appear for the team in 66 games, scoring 10 goals and adding 22 assists. He left UCSB after his junior year to pursue a professional career.

== Club career ==
While still attending college, Barrera played with the newly formed PDL team Ventura County Fusion in the summers, alongside his brother Diego Barrera. For the 2009 PDL season, Barrera and Ventura County Fusion beat Chicago Fire Premier for the league championship. Over 4 seasons, he appeared in 39 games for Ventura County, scoring 13 goals and 15 assists.

After being named to the 2011 PDL season All-League Team, Barrera signed with Serbian SuperLiga side FK Spartak Subotica (for sponsorship reasons the name was Spartak Zlatibor Voda that season) in August 2011 after a successful trial. He made his debut for Spartak against FK Borac Čačak on December 10, 2011.

=== Ventura County Fusion ===
Barrera returned to the United States in 2012 and re-joined Ventura County Fusion and appeared in 6 games, but played for Cal FC in their historic 2012 Lamar Hunt U.S. Open Cup run coached by Eric Wynalda.

=== Atlanta Silverbacks ===
In July, Barrera signed with Atlanta Silverbacks. He was the first signing of new Silverbacks head coach Eric Wynalda, who had just been appointed some days earlier. Wynalda, who coached Barrera at Cal FC, had previously stated that he's wanted Barrera playing for his team since 2010 when he first saw Barrera playing in Santa Barbara.

==== Trial at Derby County ====
In August 2012, Barrera joined English Football League Championship side Derby County F.C. on trial, where he featured in preseason friendlies against Belper Town F.C., Chesterfield F.C., and Matlock Town F.C. He would return to Atlanta after the trial proved unsuccessful.

=== San Antonio Scorpions ===
Barrera joined San Antonio Scorpions ahead of the 2014 North American Soccer League season. He was traded later that season to Carolina RailHawks for César Elizondo. At the conclusion of the season, Barrera re-joined Cal FC for their 2015 Lamar Hunt U.S. Open Cup run.

=== Sacramento Republic ===
Barrera joined Sacramento Republic FC in June 2015. He was re-signed by Sacramento for the 2016 USL season. Head coach Paul Buckle moved Barrera to a more central position in the midfield and made him the team's captain.

=== Fresno FC ===
Barrera transferred to USL side Fresno FC for the 2018 season on January 23, 2018.

=== Hartford Athletic ===
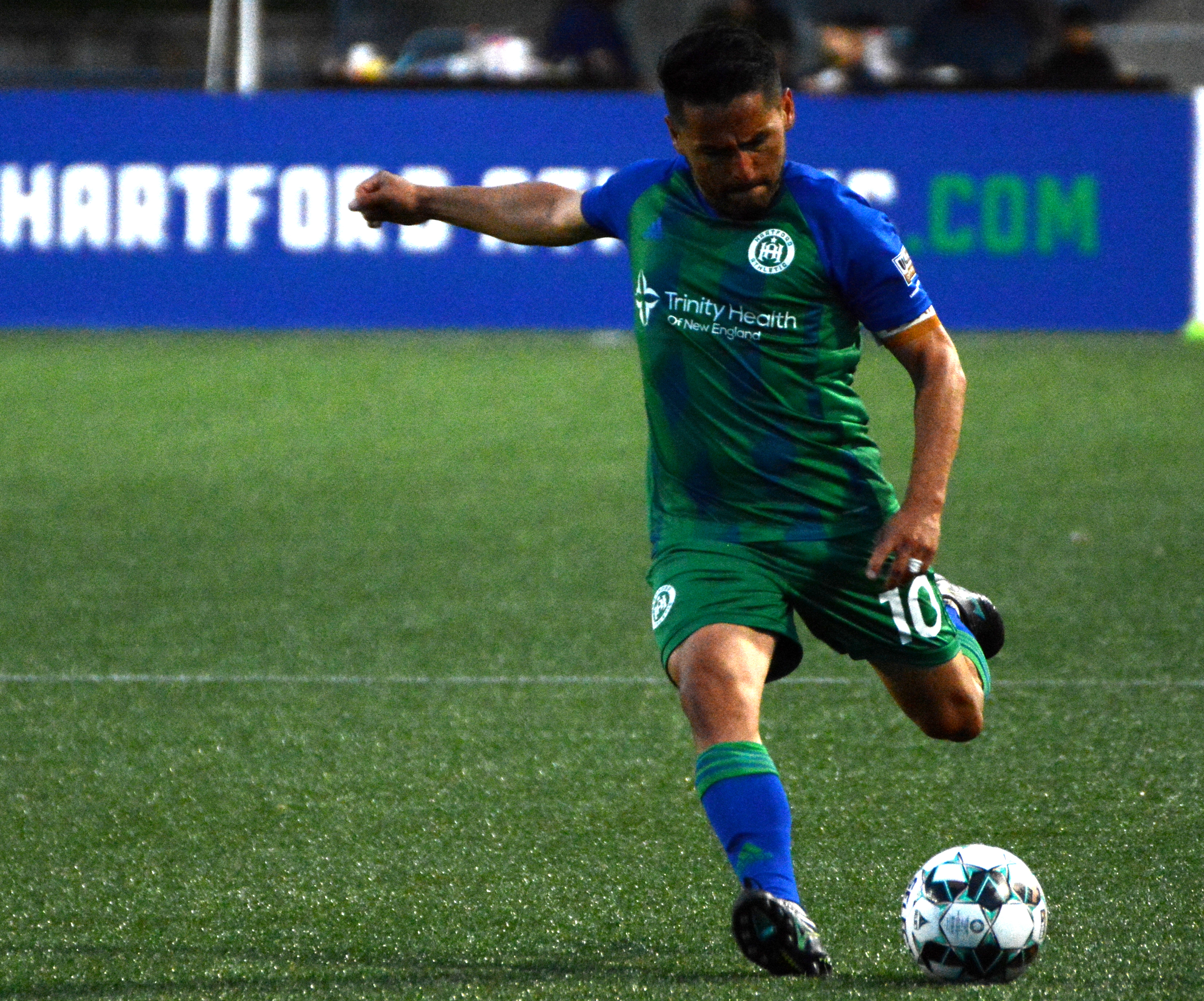
Barrera with Hartford Athletic in 2021

Barrera signed with Hartford Athletic on June 13, 2019. He led the team in assists despite just 17 games played for the 2019 season with four. He was re-signed for the 2020 season and named team captain. During the 2020 season Barrera led the team in assists for the second year in a row and was named team MVP. Barrera re signed with Hartford for the 2021 season on November 30, 2020. In October 2021, Barrera was named to the USL Championship's All-Time Hispanic Team. Barrera recorded 12 assists during the 2021 season, the most of any player in the USL Championship.

Barrera re-signed with Hartford ahead of the 2022 season.

He left the club at the end of the 2024 season.

In 2026, Barrera played for the Hartford Athletic reserve team in the UPSL. He scored in a 4–2 win over Southwest Futbol Club on May 31, 2026.

== International career ==
When he was 17 he was a member of the USA team at the 2007 Pan-American Games being the youngest player on the roster. He also represented the United States at U17 and U18 levels.

== Personal life ==
Danny's older brother, Diego Barrera, is also a professional soccer player. Barrera enjoys being able to experience other cultures through his soccer experiences and plans to be a coach after he retires. Barrera has a brief appearance and line in the Will Ferrell movie Kicking and Screaming as his coach Dan Metcalfe was also the movies soccer choreographer and used several of his youth players in the movie.

Barrera and his partner Vanessa have four children.

== Awards and honors ==
Individual

- USL All-League Team: 2016
- Hartford Athletic Team MVP 2020
- USL Championship's All-Time Hispanic Team
