= Samad Bounthong =

American soccer player

Personal information
- Date of birth: February 4, 1997 (age 29)
- Place of birth: Seattle, Washington, United States
- Height: 1.78 m (5 ft 10 in)
- Position: Midfielder

Youth career
- 2015–2016: New York Red Bulls

College career
Years	Team	Apps	(Gls)
2016–2019	Marist Red Foxes	72	(14)

Senior career*
Years	Team	Apps	(Gls)
2020	New York Red Bulls II	13	(1)
- * Club domestic league appearances and goals as of October 6, 2020

Samad Bounthong (born February 4, 1997) is an American soccer player who plays as a defender.

== Personal life ==
Samad was born in Seattle, Washington. He is of Laotian Khmu and Cham ethnicity. Due to his parents' original nationalities, he is an Asian American.

== Career ==
=== College ===
Bounthong played four years of college soccer at Marist College between 2016 and 2019, making 72 appearances, scoring 14 goals and tallying 11 assists.

=== Professional ===
Bounthong signed for USL Championship side New York Red Bulls II on March 6, 2020. He made his professional debut the next day, starting in a 1–0 loss against Tampa Bay Rowdies. He was released by Red Bulls II on November 30, 2020.
