= Omar Sowe =

Gambian soccer player

Personal information
- Date of birth: 28 October 2000 (age 26)
- Place of birth: Serekunda, The Gambia
- Height: 1.84 m (6 ft 0 in)
- Positions: Winger; forward

Team information
- Current team: ÍBV
- Number: 67

Youth career
- 2018–2019: New York Red Bulls

Senior career*
Years	Team	Apps	(Gls)
2019	New York Red Bulls U23	4	(0)
2019–2021	New York Red Bulls II	48	(17)
2021–2022	New York Red Bulls	1	(0)
2022	→ Breiðablik (loan)	17	(2)
2023–2024	Leiknir Reykjavík	53	(26)
2025–	ÍBV	22	(8)
- * Club domestic league appearances and goals as of 16 November 2026

Omar Sowe (born 28 October 2000) is a Gambian professional footballer who plays as a forward for Besta deild karla club ÍBV.

== Career ==
=== Early career ===
Raised in Harrison, New Jersey, Sowe attended Harrison High School and became the school's all-time leading scorer in October 2018. He finished his four year high school career with 89 goals and 67 assists, as well as being named to the NJSCAA All-State team in 2017 and 2018.

Sowe began playing with the New York Red Bulls academy in 2018. He also appeared for the club's USL League Two side New York Red Bulls U-23.

=== New York Red Bulls II ===
Sowe signed his first professional contract with the New York Red Bulls II on 16 August 2019. He made his professional debut on 24 August 2019, appearing as a 66th-minute substitute during a 5–1 victory over Swope Park Rangers. On 21 September 2019, Sowe scored his first goal as a professional in a 5–3 loss against Louisville City FC. On 9 September 2020, Sowe recorded scored three goals in a 6–0 victory over Philadelphia Union II. Sowe finished the 2020 season leading Red Bulls II in goals with 7.

On 18 May 2021, Sowe scored his first goal of the season in a 2–1 victory over Loudoun United.

=== New York Red Bulls ===
On 11 September 2021, Sowe made the move to the New York Red Bulls MLS roster. He made his debut the same day, appearing as a 70th-minute substitute during a 1–1 draw with D.C. United.

Following the 2022 season, his contract option was declined by New York.

==== Breiðablik (loan) ====
On 24 March 2022, New York announced that they had loaned Sowe to Breiðablik of the Icelandic Besta-deild karla. Sowe scored his first goal for the club on 7 May 2022, during a 5–1 victory over ÍA.

=== Leiknir Reykjavík ===
On 29 December 2022, Sowe signed with Icelandic second division club Leiknir Reykjavík.

=== ÍBV ===
On 4 November 2024, Sowe joined Besta deild karla club ÍBV, signing a two-year contract.

== Career statistics ==
As of 14 July 2022

Appearances and goals by club, season and competition
Club	Season	League			Playoffs		Cup		Continental		Total	
Club	Season	Division	Apps	Goals	Apps	Goals	Apps	Goals	Apps	Goals	Apps	Goals
New York Red Bulls U-23	2019	USL League Two	4	0	—		2	1	—		6	1
New York Red Bulls II	2019	USL Championship	5	2	1	0	—		—		6	2
New York Red Bulls II	2020	USL Championship	14	7	—		—		—		14	7
New York Red Bulls II	2021	USL Championship	29	8	—		—		—		29	8
New York Red Bulls II	Total		51	17	1	0	—		—		52	17
New York Red Bulls	2021	Major League Soccer	1	0	—		—		—		1	0
Breiðablik (loan)	2022	Besta-deild karla	17	2	—		3	2	4	0	24	4
Career total			70	19	1	0	5	3	4	0	80	22
