= Sebastian Elney =

Haitian footballer (born 1997)

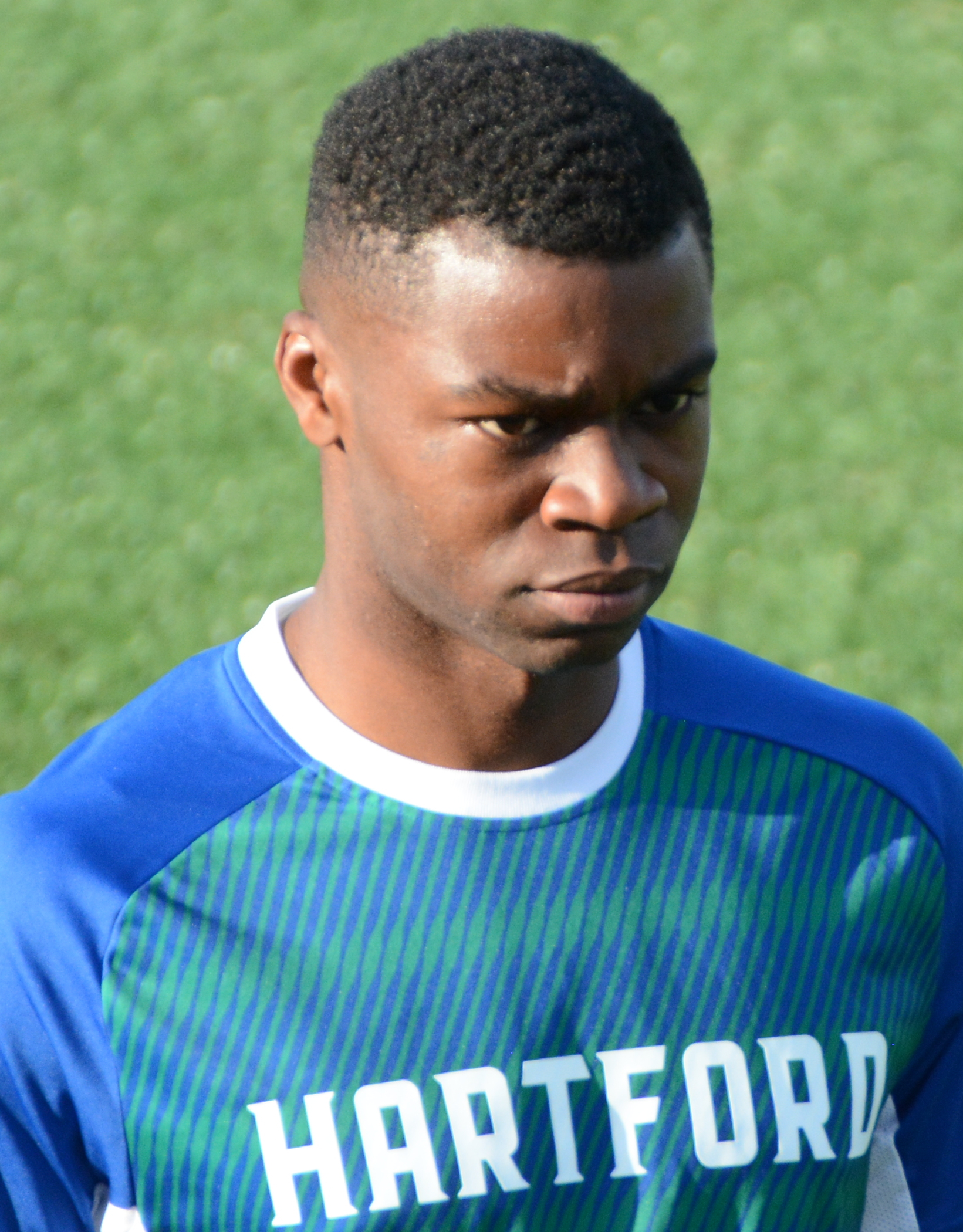
- Elney with Hartford Athletic in 2021

Personal information
- Date of birth: 26 June 1997 (age 29)
- Place of birth: Boca Raton, Florida, United States
- Height: 1.85 m (6 ft 1 in)
- Position: Forward

Youth career
- 2015: Philadelphia Union

College career
Years	Team	Apps	(Gls)
2015–2018	Maryland Terrapins	78	(17)

Senior career*
Years	Team	Apps	(Gls)
2019–2020	New York Red Bulls II	36	(7)
2021	Hartford Athletic	20	(1)

International career^{‡}
2013	United States U17	3	(0)
2014	United States U18	4	(1)
2015	United States U20	1	(0)
2021–	Haiti	2	(0)
- * Club domestic league appearances and goals as of 23 October 2021 ‡ National team caps and goals as of 6 September 2021

Sebastian Elney (born 26 June 1997) is a professional footballer who plays as a forward. Born in the United States, Elney represents the Haiti national team.

== Career ==
=== Youth ===
Eleny grew up in Boca Raton, Florida and played with Boca United. In 2015 he played for the Philadelphia Union Academy. He attended the University of Maryland, College Park and played for the Maryland Terrapins for four seasons, winning the National Championship in his last season.

=== New York Red Bulls II ===
On 8 March 2019, Elney signed his first professional contract with New York Red Bulls II. On 9 March 2019, he made his debut with the club, appearing in a 3–1 victory over Swope Park Rangers. He was released by Red Bulls II on 30 November 2020.

=== Hartford Athletic ===
On 25 February 2021, Elney signed with Hartford Athletic.

== International career ==
Elney played for several Team USA youth national teams before changing his national team affiliation to Hati in 2021. He was on Haiti's preliminary roster for 2021 Olympic qualifiers but did not appear in a game. Elney debuted with the Haiti national team in a friendly 5–1 loss to Bahrain on 1 September 2021.
