= 2020 Sporting Kansas City II season =

Sporting Kansas City II
2020 season
- General manager: Kurt Austin
- Head coach: Paulo Nagamura
- Stadium: Children's Mercy Park
- USL Championship: Group E: 4th Eastern Conf.: 12th
- USL Playoffs: Did not qualify
- Top goalscorer: Wilson Harris
- Highest home attendance: League/All:
- Lowest home attendance: League/All:
- Average home league attendance: 691
- Biggest win: SKC 3–0 OKC (Aug. 22)
- Biggest defeat: ATX 4–0 SKC (Sept. 22)
Home colors	Away colors

The 2020 Sporting Kansas City II season was the club's first year under the new name of Sporting Kansas City II, fifth year of play and their second season in the Eastern Conference of the USL Championship, the top tier of United Soccer League. The second tier of the United States Soccer Pyramid. The team continued to play at Children's Mercy Park.

The season was suspended on March 12, for 30 days, due to the coronavirus pandemic. Following that decision, on March 18 the USL extended its temporary suspension until May 10.

== Roster ==
As of March 6, 2020

No.	Position	Nation	Player
30	DF	ARG	Luis Olivera (on loan from Atenas)
31	GK	USA	Brooks Thompson
32	MF	USA	Christian Duke
33	DF	USA	Danny Barbir
34	FW	CRO	Dominik Rešetar (on loan from Dinamo Zagreb II)
35	MF	CMR	Duval Wapiwo (on loan from MFK Vyškov)
39	DF	CRO	Petar Čuić (on loan from Dinamo Zagreb II)
40	DF	USA	Dillon Serna
42	GK	USA	Remi Prieur
44	MF	USA	Camden Riley
48	DF	USA	Kaveh Rad
49	MF	USA	Will Little
70	FW	POR	Zé Pedro
77	FW	CGO	Enoch Mushagalusa
80	FW	HAI	Fredinho Mompremier
88	DF	USA	Sam Raben
96	FW	USA	Wilson Harris
—	MF	USA	Jaret Townsend

Signed to first team contract with MLS affiliate Sporting Kansas City.
Sporting Kansas City Academy player.

== Player movement ==
=== In ===
Date	Player	Position	Previous club	Fee/notes	Ref
January 4, 2020	(United States) Christian Duke	Midfielder	(United States) Orange County SC	Signing	
January 24, 2020	(United States) Kaveh Rad	Defender	Sporting Academy	Signing	
January 27, 2020	(United States) Danny Barbir	Defender	(Romania) FC Astra Giurgiu	Signing	
February 17, 2020	(United States) Remi Prieur	Goalkeeper	(United States) Saint Mary's College	Signing	
February 26, 2020	(Haiti) Fredinho Mompremier	Forward	Colorado Rapids Academy	Signing	
February 26, 2020	(United States) Enoch Mushagalusa	Forward	(United States) FC Tulsa	Signing	
February 26, 2020	(United States) Sam Raben	Defender	(United States) Colorado Springs Switchbacks	Signing	
February 28, 2020	(United States) Dillon Serna	Midfielder	(United States) Colorado Rapids	Signing	
March 6, 2020	(United States) Jaret Townsend	Midfielder	MLS Draft Pick	Signed Draft Pick	

=== Out ===
Date	Player	Position	Destination club	Notes	Ref
November 6, 2019	(United States) Camilo Benítez	Midfielder	N/A	Retired	
November 22, 2019	(Jamaica) Rennico Clarke	Defender		Option Declined	
November 22, 2019	(United States) Mark Segbers	Midfielder	(United States) Memphis 901 FC	Option Declined	
November 22, 2019	(France) Killian Colombie	Forward		Option Declined	
November 22, 2019	(United States) Tucker Stephenson	Forward	(United States) OKC Energy FC	Option Declined	
November 22, 2019	(Russia) Rassambek Akhmatov	Midfielder		Out of Contract	
November 22, 2019	(Morocco) Ayyoub Allach	Midfielder		Out of Contract	
November 22, 2019	(Ghana) William Opoku Mensah	Forward		Out of Contract	
November 22, 2019	(United States) Ethan Vanacore-Decker	Forward	(United States) Union Omaha	Out of Contract	
November 22, 2019	(Brazil) Alexsander	Defender	(Brazil) Club Athletico Paranaense	Loan Expired	
November 22, 2019	(Cameroon) Jerome Ngom Mbekeli	Defender	(Cameroon) Apejes FC de Mfou	Loan Expired	
November 22, 2019	(United States) Mo Abualnadi	Defender	(United States) Notre Dame	Collegiate Programs	
November 22, 2019	(United States) Sean Karani	Defender	(United States) Temple	Collegiate Programs	
November 22, 2019	(South Korea) Josh Chong	Forward	Sporting Academy	Academy Contract Expired	
November 22, 2019	(United States) Jake Davis	Midfielder	Sporting Academy	Academy Contract Expired	
November 22, 2019	(United States) Dylan Hooper	Defender	Sporting Academy	Academy Contract Expired	
November 22, 2019	(United States) Gavin Krenecki	Goalkeeper	Sporting Academy	Academy Contract Expired	
November 22, 2019	(United States) Tucker Lepley	Midfielder	Sporting Academy	Academy Contract Expired	
November 22, 2019	(United States) Jahon Rad	Midfielder	Sporting Academy	Academy Contract Expired	
November 22, 2019	(United States) Max Trejo	Goalkeeper	Sporting Academy	Academy Contract Expired	
February 24, 2020	(United States) John Pulskamp	Goalkeeper	(United States) Sporting Kansas City	Promotion to first team	

=== Loans ===
Per Major League Soccer and club policies terms of the deals do not get disclosed.

==== In ====
Date	Player	Position	Loaned from	Notes	Ref
January 7, 2020	(Cameroon) Duval Wapiwo	Midfielder	(Czech Republic) MFK Vyškov	Sporting Kansas City II adds Cameroonian midfielder Duval Wapiwo on loan for 2020 season	
January 22, 2020	(Croatia) Dominik Rešetar	Forward	(Croatia) Dinamo Zagreb II	Sporting KC II signs Croatian duo Petar Čuić and Dominik Rešetar on loan from Dinamo Zagreb II	
January 22, 2020	(Croatia) Petar Čuić	Defender	(Croatia) Dinamo Zagreb II	Sporting KC II signs Croatian duo Petar Čuić and Dominik Rešetar on loan from Dinamo Zagreb II	

== Competitions ==
=== Preseason ===
Kickoff times are in CST (UTC-06) unless shown otherwise

Preseason schedule announced on January 24, 2020.

February 15, 2020 Preseason 1	OKC Energy FC	1–1	Sporting Kansas City II	Wichita, KS
2:00 pm	Chavez 4'	Report	Rad 85' (pen.)	Stadium: Stryker Sports complex

February 22, 2020 Preseason 2	Sporting Kansas City II	4–1	Iowa Western Reivers	Kansas City, MO
2:00 pm	Duke 22'; Zé Pedro 52'; Townsend 67'; Mompremier 74'	Report	Magana 49'	Stadium: Swope Soccer Village
Note: Match originally scheduled against Texas United.

February 27, 2020 Preseason 3	North Texas SC	1–1	Sporting Kansas City II	Frisco, TX
2:00 pm	Sealy 11' (pen.)	Report	Mompremier 120+1'	Stadium: Toyota Soccer Center
Note: 120-minute match

February 29, 2020 Preseason 4	FC Tulsa	1–2	Sporting Kansas City II	Tulsa, OK
1:00 pm	Martinez 62'	Report	Zé Pedro 8'; Harris 78' (pen.)	Stadium: Titan Sports Complex
Note: Final Preseason Match

=== USL is back Friendlies ===
July 3, 2020 Friendly	OKC Energy FC	1–0	Sporting Kansas City II	Oklahoma City, OK
1:00 pm	Chavez 55'	Report		Stadium: OCCHD Training Facility

=== USL Championship ===
==== Results summary ====
Overall								Home						Away					
Pld	W	D	L	GF	GA	GD	Pts	W	D	L	GF	GA	GD	W	D	L	GF	GA	GD
1	0	0	1	1	2	−1	0	0	0	1	1	2	−1	0	0	0	0	0	0

Last updated: July 5, 2020.
Source: USL

==== Results by matchday ====
Matchday	1	2	3	4	5	6	7	8	9	10	11	12	13	14	15	16
Stadium	H	A	A	A	A	A	A	A	H	A	A	A	A	A	A	A
Result	L															
Position	12															

Updated to match(es) played on July 5, 2020. Source: USL
A = Away; H = Home; W = Win; D = Draw; L = Loss

==== Table ====
Group E

Pos	Team	Pld	W	D	L	GF	GA	GD	Pts	PPG	Qualification
1	Louisville City FC	16	11	2	3	28	12	+16	35	2.19	Advance to USL Championship Playoffs
2	Saint Louis FC	16	7	4	5	22	21	+1	25	1.56	Advance to USL Championship Playoffs
3	Indy Eleven	16	7	2	7	21	19	+2	23	1.44	
4	Sporting Kansas City II	16	5	1	10	21	30	−9	16	1.00	

Source: USL

==== Matches ====
Win Draw Loss Upcoming

March 8, 2020 USLC 1	Sporting Kansas City II	1–2	Charlotte Independence	Kansas City, Kansas
4:00 pm	Maher 19' (o.g.); Čuić (yellow card) 79'	Report	Johnson (yellow card) 15'; Gebhard 25'; Kelly (yellow card) 30', (goal) 85'	Stadium: Children's Mercy Park; Attendance: 691; Referee: Lukasz Szpala
Note: Home Opener

July 18, 2020 USLC 2	Indy Eleven	2–1	Sporting Kansas City II	Indianapolis, Indiana
6:00 pm CDT	Pasher 39'; Haworth (yellow card) 43'; Barrett 67'; Ilić (yellow card) 71'; Antley (yellow card) 90+9'	Report	Čuić (yellow card) 26'; Rad (yellow card) 35'; Riley (yellow card) 40'; Harris 53'; Barbir (yellow card) 82'	Stadium: Lucas Oil Stadium; Attendance: 4,931; Referee: Eric Tattersall

July 25, 2020 USLC 3	Louisville City FC	1–0	Sporting Kansas City II	Louisville, Kentucky
7:00 PM CDT	Matsoso (yellow card) 19'; Lancaster 50'; Jimenez (yellow card) 67'	Report	Duke (yellow card) 32'; Rad (yellow card) 87'	Stadium: Louisville Slugger Field; Attendance: 4,850; Referee: Nabil Bensalah

July 29, 2020 USLC 4	Louisville City FC	1–2	Sporting Kansas City II	Louisville, Kentucky
7:00 PM CDT	Lancaster 21'; Ockford (yellow card) 36'; Totsch (yellow card) 90+4'	Report	Rešetar 8', (yellow card) 61'; Harris 83'	Stadium: Louisville Slugger Field; Attendance: 4,850; Referee: Joshua Few

August 1, 2020 USLC 5	Indy Eleven	0–1	Sporting Kansas City II	Indianapolis, Indiana
6:00 PM CDT	Ayoze (yellow card) 88'; Osmond (yellow card) 90+7'	Report	Rad (yellow card) 50'; Barbir 70'; Duke (yellow card) 76'	Stadium: Lucas Oil Stadium; Attendance: 5,409; Referee: Youssef Elmessoussi

August 5, 2020 USLC 6	Saint Louis FC	1–1	Sporting Kansas City II	Fenton, Missouri
TBA PM CDT	Kavita 90+6'	Report	Riley (yellow card) 42'; Mushagalusa 56'; Prieur (yellow card) 90+5'	Stadium: Toyota Stadium; Attendance: 1,156; Referee: Jon Freemon

August 12, 2020 USLC 7	Louisville City FC	P–P	Sporting Kansas City II	Louisville, Kentucky
TBA PM CDT				Stadium: Louisville Slugger Field
Note: Match postponed due to positive covid-19 test in the SKCII organization.

August 15, 2020 USLC 8	Saint Louis FC	3–1	Sporting Kansas City II	Fenton, Missouri
7:00 PM CDT	Cicerone 5'; Samb 69'; Rivas 90+2', (yellow card) 90+7'	Report	Riley (yellow card) 36'; Duke 40'; LeFlore (yellow card) 62'; Rad (red card) 90+5'	Stadium: Toyota Stadium; Attendance: 736; Referee: Jervis Atagana

August 19, 2020 USLC 7	Louisville City FC	4–1	Sporting Kansas City II	Louisville, Kentucky
8:00 PM CDT	Lancaster 11'; Bone 29', 36'; Jimenez (yellow card) 38'; Matsoso 53'; Totsch (yellow card) 90+5'	Report	Raben 32'	Stadium: Louisville Slugger Field; Attendance: 4,850; Referee: Youssef Elmessoussi
Note: Match originally scheduled to be played on 12 August.

August 22, 2020 USLC 9	Sporting Kansas City II	3–0	OKC Energy FC	Kansas City, Kansas
7:00 PM CDT	Harris 5', 22', (yellow card) 54'; Barbir (yellow card) 19', (goal) 66'; Mompremier (yellow card) 42'; Rešetar (yellow card) 87'	Report	Brown (yellow card) 60'	Stadium: Children's Mercy Park; Referee: Jon Freemon

August 29, 2020 USLC 10	FC Tulsa	1–2	Sporting Kansas City II	Tulsa, Oklahoma
7:00 PM CDT	Kwambe (yellow card) 36'; Martinez 39'	Report	Mompremier 20', (yellow card) 86'; Riley (yellow card) 25'; Harris 55'; Duke (yellow card) 90'; Davis (yellow card) 90+4'	Stadium: Oneok Field; Attendance: Chris Ruska; Referee: 2,790

September 4, 2020 USLC 11	Saint Louis FC	3–2	Sporting Kansas City II	Fenton, Missouri
7:00 PM CDT	Greig 54'; Blackwood 58'; Fink (yellow card) 70'; Dacres 83'; Morton (yellow card) 90+3'	Report	Davis (yellow card) 20'; Harris 47', 90+3' (pen.); Mompremier (yellow card) 52'	Stadium: Toyota Stadium; Referee: Matt Geringer

September 9, 2020 USLC 12	Indy Eleven	2–1	Sporting Kansas City II	Indianapolis, Indiana
6:00 PM CDT	Barrett (yellow card) 3'; Moon 6'; Rafanello 63'; Conner (yellow card) 86'	Report	Rešetar (yellow card) 23'; Serna (yellow card) 53'; Riley (yellow card) 58'; Davis (yellow card) 59'; Čuić (yellow card) 74'; Freeman 88'	Stadium: Lucas Oil Stadium; Referee: Ismir Pekmic

September 19, 2020 USLC 13	Saint Louis FC	3–2	Sporting Kansas City II	Fenton, Missouri
7:00 PM CDT	Blackwood 12'; Cicerone 43'; Fink (yellow card) 71', (goal) 90+5'; Wharton (yellow card) 90+1'	Report	Čuić 59'; Davis (yellow card) 66'; LeFlore 86'; Leeth (yellow card) 90+5'	Stadium: Toyota Stadium; Referee: Matthew Thompson

September 22, 2020 USLC 14	Austin Bold FC	4–0	Sporting Kansas City II	Austin, Texas
8:00 PM CDT	Báez (yellow card) 10', (goal) 57'; Taylor (yellow card) 13'; Watson (yellow card) 29'; Twumasi (yellow card) 37'; Rad 61' (o.g.); Diouf 73', (yellow card) 85'; Quintanilla 90+3'	Report	Serna (yellow card) 45+4'; Davis (yellow card) 67'; Mompremier (yellow card) 89'	Stadium: Bold Stadium; Attendance: 1,244; Referee: Matthew Corrigan

September 30, 2020 USLC 15	Indy Eleven	1–2	Sporting Kansas City II	Indianapolis, Indiana
6:00 PM CDT	Lindley (yellow card) 38'; Carleton 49'; Watson (yellow card) 73'	Report	Harris 41'; Sparks (yellow card) 86', (goal) 90+5'	Stadium: Lucas Oil Stadium; Attendance: 6,039; Referee: Calin Radosav

October 3, 2020 USLC 16	Louisville City FC	2–1	Sporting Kansas City II	Louisville, Kentucky
6:30 PM CDT	DelPiccolo 26'; Lancaster 40'; Spencer (yellow card) 89'	Report	Freeman 64'; Pierre (yellow card) 69'; Riley (yellow card) 90+3'	Stadium: Louisville Slugger Field; Attendance: 4,900; Referee: Nabil Bensalah

=== U.S. Open Cup ===
Due to their ownership by a higher division professional club (Sporting Kansas City), SKC II is one of 15 teams expressly forbidden from entering the Cup competition.

== Player statistics ==
=== Squad appearances and goals ===
Last updated on March 10, 2020.

No.	Pos	Nat	Player	Total		USL Championship		Playoffs	
No.	Pos	Nat	Player	Apps	Goals	Apps	Goals	Apps	Goals
Goalkeepers
1	GK	(Mexico) MEX	Richard Sánchez	1	0	1	0	0	0
31	GK	(United States) USA	Brooks Thomson	0	0	0	0	0	0
42	GK	(United States) USA	Remi Prieur	0	0	0	0	0	0
Defenders
13	DF	(United States) USA	Amadou Dia	1	0	1	0	0	0
16	DF	(United States) USA	Graham Smith	1	0	1	0	0	0
26	DF	(United States) USA	Jaylin Lindsey	1	0	1	0	0	0
30	DF	(Argentina) ARG	Luis Olivera	0	0	0	0	0	0
33	DF	(United States) USA	Danny Barbir	0	0	0	0	0	0
39	DF	(Croatia) CRO	Petar Čuić	1	0	1	0	0	0
44	DF	(United States) USA	Camden Riley	0	0	0	0	0	0
Midfielders
21	MF	(Colombia) COL	Felipe Hernandez	1	0	1	0	0	0
27	MF	(United States) USA	Gianluca Busio	1	0	1	0	0	0
32	MF	(United States) USA	Christian Duke	0	0	0	0	0	0
35	MF	(Cameroon) CMR	Duval Wapiwo	0	0	0	0	0	0
40	MF	(United States) USA	Sam Raben	0	0	0	0	0	0
44	MF	(United States) USA	Camden Riley	1	0	1	0	0	0
49	MF	(United States) USA	Will Little	0	0	0	0	0	0
75	MF	(Malaysia) MAS	Wan Kuzain Wan Kamal	1	0	0+1	0	0	0
99	MF	(United States) USA	Jaret Townsend	0	0	0	0	0	0
Forwards
34	FW	(Croatia) CRO	Dominik Rešetar	1	0	0+1	0	0	0
70	FW	(Portugal) POR	Zé Pedro	1	0	1	0	0	0
77	FW	(United States) USA	Enoch Mushagalusa	1	0	0+1	0	0	0
80	FW	(Haiti) HAI	Fredinho Mompremier	1	0	1	0	0	0
96	FW	(United States) USA	Wilson Harris	1	0	1	0	0	0
Players who have made an appearance or had a squad number this season but have left the club
