= 2019 Swope Park Rangers season =

Swope Park Rangers
2019 season
- General manager: Kurt Austin
- Head coach: Paulo Nagamura
- Stadium: Children's Mercy Park
- USL Championship: 18th (Eastern Conference)
- USL Playoffs: Did not qualify
- Top goalscorer: TBD
- Highest home attendance: League/All: 1,565 (October 8 vs. Ottawa Fury FC)
- Lowest home attendance: League/All: 232 (April 15 vs. Indy Eleven)
- Average home league attendance: 505
- Biggest win: 3–0 (Sept. 21 at Charlotte)
- Biggest defeat: 3–8 (October 12 at Louisville)
| Home colors | Away colors |

The 2019 Swope Park Rangers season was the club's fourth year of play and their first season in the Eastern Conference of the newly renamed USL Championship, the top tier of United Soccer League. The second tier of the United States Soccer Pyramid. The Rangers continued to play at Children's Mercy Park after complications with Shawnee Mission District Stadium in Overland Park, Kansas.

== Previous season ==
The 2018 Swope Park Rangers season finished the year with a record of 15-8-11 and 7th in the Western Conference qualifying for the 2018 USL Playoffs.

In the first round, Swope Park defeated #2 seed Sacramento Republic 2–1. In the conference semi-finals, the Rangers lost to #3 Phoenix Rising 4–2.

== Roster ==
As of March 5, 2019

| No. | Position | Nation | Player |
|---|---|---|---|
| 1 | GK | USA | Adrian Zendejas |
| 11 | MF | USA | Kelyn Rowe |
| 13 | MF | USA | Gianluca Busio |
| 14 | DF | LIE | Nicolas Hasler |
| 16 | DF | USA | Graham Smith |
| 23 | FW | USA | Tyler Freeman |
| 24 | MF | USA | Gedion Zelalem |
| 26 | DF | USA | Jaylin Lindsey |
| 31 | GK | USA | Brooks Thompson |
| 33 | DF | JAM | Rennico Clarke |
| 39 | DF | CMR | Jerome Ngom Mbekeli |
| 43 | DF | USA | Mark Segbers |
| 44 | DF | USA | Camden Riley |
| 45 | GK | USA | John Pulskamp |
| 47 | MF | USA | Tucker Lepley |
| 48 | DF | USA | Kaveh Rad |
| 49 | MF | USA | Will Little |
| 50 | DF | USA | Dylan Hooper |
| 53 | FW | FRA | Killian Colombie |
| 54 | FW | KOR | Josh Chong |
| 60 | DF | JOR | Mo Abualnadi |
| 63 | FW | USA | Tucker Stephenson |
| 64 | MF | USA | Jake Davis |
| 67 | GK | USA | Max Trejo |
| 70 | FW | POR | Zé Pedro |
| 75 | MF | MAS | Wan Kuzain |
| 77 | MF | ECU | Camilo Benitez |
| 79 | FW | GHA | William Opoku Mensah |
| 80 | FW | USA | Sean Karani |
| 84 | MF | USA | Jahon Rad |
| 85 | MF | COL | Felipe Hernandez |
| 91 | FW | USA | Ethan Vanacore-Decker |
| 92 | MF | BRA | Jhonatta de Oliveira Andrade |
| 95 | MF | RUS | Rassambek Akhmatov |
| 96 | FW | USA | Wilson Harris |
| 98 | MF | MAR | Ayyoub Allach |

Signed to first team contract with MLS affiliate Sporting Kansas City.
Sporting Kansas City Academy player.
Sporting Kansas City Academy contract.

== Player movement ==
=== In ===
| Date | Player | Position | Previous club | Fee/notes | Ref |
|---|---|---|---|---|---|
| January 4, 2019 | (Belgium) (Morocco) Ayyoub Allach | MF | (Belgium) Lierse S.K. | Signing | |
| January 4, 2019 | (Cameroon) Jerome Ngom Mbekeli | MF | (Cameroon) Apejes FC de Mfou | Signing | |
| January 31, 2019 | (Brazil) Alexsander | MF | (Brazil) Club Athletico Paranaense | On Loan to Swope Park | |
| February 6, 2019 | (United States) Mark Segbers | DF | (United States) New England Revolution | Signing | |
| February 12, 2019 | (France) Killian Colombie | FW | (United States) Albion Hurricanes FC Royals | Signing | |
| March 6, 2019 | (Ghana) William Opoku Mensah | FW | (Ghana) Karela United FC | Signing | |
| March 7, 2019 | (United States) Brooks Thompson | GK | (United States) Sporting KC Academy | Signing | |
| March 8, 2019 | (United States) Mo Abualnadi | DF | (United States) Sporting KC Academy | Signing | |
| March 8, 2019 | (United States) Jake Davis | MF | (United States) Sporting KC Academy | Signing | |
| March 8, 2019 | (United States) Sean Karani | FW | (United States) Sporting KC Academy | Signing | |
| April 4, 2019 | (United States) Max Trejo | GK | (United States) Sporting KC Academy | Signing | |
| April 4, 2019 | (United States) Dylan Hooper | DF | (United States) Sporting KC Academy | Signing | |
| April 4, 2019 | (United States) Kaveh Rad | DF | (United States) Sporting KC Academy | Signing | |
| April 4, 2019 | (United States) Tucker Lepley | MF | (United States) Sporting KC Academy | Signing | |
| April 5, 2019 | (United States) John Pulskamp | GK | (United States) LA Galaxy Academy | Signing | |
| July 23, 2019 | (United States) Tucker Stephenson | FW | (United States) Kaw Valley FC | Signing | |
| July 29, 2019 | (Portugal) Zé Pedro | FW | (Portugal) S.C. Covilhã | Signing | |
| July 30, 2019 | (Jamaica) Rennico Clarke | DF | (Jamaica) Harbour View F.C. | Signing | |

=== Out ===
| Date | Player | Position | Destination club | Notes | Ref |
|---|---|---|---|---|---|
| November 30, 2018 | (Mexico) Christian Herrera | GK | (United States) Orlando City B | Option Declined, Out of Contract | |
| November 30, 2018 | (Canada) Darrin MacLeod | GK | (United States) North Carolina FC | Option Declined, Out of Contract | |
| November 30, 2018 | (United States) Dakota Barnathan | DF | (Canada) Ottawa Fury | Option Declined, Out of Contract | |
| November 30, 2018 | (Martinique) Thierry Catherine | DF | (Martinique) Golden Lion FC | Option Declined, Out of Contract | |
| November 30, 2018 | (United States) Matt Lewis | DF | (United States) New York Cosmos | Option Declined, Out of Contract | |
| November 30, 2018 | (United States) Parker Maher | DF | TBD | Option Declined, Out of Contract | |
| November 30, 2018 | (Colombia) Bryam Rebellón | DF | (United States) El Paso Locomotive FC | Option Declined, Out of Contract | |
| November 30, 2018 | (United States) Chase Minter | MF | TBD | Option Declined, Out of Contract | |
| November 30, 2018 | (Brazil) Matheus Silva | MF | (United States) Orlando City B | Option Declined, Out of Contract | |
| November 30, 2018 | (Venezuela) Jose Barragan | FW | TBD | Option Declined, Out of Contract | |
| November 30, 2018 | (England) Tyler Blackwood | FW | (United States) Sacramento Republic FC | Option Declined, Out of Contract | |
| November 30, 2018 | (Guinea) Hadji Barry | FW | (Israel) Ironi Kiryat Shmona | Out of Contract | |
| April 24, 2019 | (United States) Justin Bilyeu | DF | | Retired | |

== Competitions ==
=== Preseason ===
| February 2, 2019 1 | Swope Park Rangers | 5–0 | Barton Cougars | Kansas City, MO |
| 2:00 PM | Vanacore-Decker; Bedi 51' (pen.), 75'; Solabarrieta 70'; Schneider 78' | Report | | Stadium: Swope Soccer Village |

| February 9, 2019 2 | Swope Park Rangers | – | Iowa Western Reivers | Kansas City, MO |
| 2:00 PM | | | | Stadium: Swope Soccer Village |
Note: Match was cancelled.

| February 13, 2019 3 | North Texas SC | 1–2 | Swope Park Rangers | Frisco, TX |
| 11:00 AM | Pepi 5' | Report | Mbekeli 47'; Mushagalusa 53' | Stadium: Toyota Soccer Center |

| February 16, 2019 4 | Tulsa Roughnecks FC | 2–1 | Swope Park Rangers | Tulsa, OK |
| 1:00 PM | Altamirano 45' (pen.); Bastidas 85' | Report | Colombie (yellow card) 2'; N'Diaye (yellow card) 40'; Sanchez (yellow card) 67'; K. Rad 85' | Stadium: Titan Sports and Performance Center |

| February 23, 2019 5 | Creighton Bluejays | — | Swope Park Rangers | Omaha, NE |
| 1:00 PM | | Report | | Stadium: Morrison Stadium |
Note: Cancelled due to inclement weather.

| March 2, 2019 6 | Swope Park Rangers | 4–0 | Texas United | Kansas City, MO |
| 2:00 PM | Harris 7', 68'; Allach 39'; Karani (yellow card) 72', (goal) 88' | Report | | Stadium: Swope Soccer Village |

=== USL Championship ===
==== Standings ====
| Pos | Team | Pld | W | D | L | GF | GA | GD | Pts |
|---|---|---|---|---|---|---|---|---|---|
| 14 | Atlanta United 2 | 34 | 9 | 8 | 17 | 45 | 77 | −32 | 35 |
| 15 | Memphis 901 FC | 34 | 9 | 7 | 18 | 37 | 52 | −15 | 34 |
| 16 | Bethlehem Steel FC | 34 | 8 | 7 | 19 | 49 | 78 | −29 | 31 |
| 17 | Hartford Athletic | 34 | 8 | 5 | 21 | 49 | 80 | −31 | 29 |
| 18 | Swope Park Rangers | 34 | 6 | 8 | 20 | 46 | 80 | −34 | 26 |

Source: USL Championship Standings
Rules for classification: 1) total wins; 2) total goal differential; 3) total goals scored; 4) points earned against top four Conference finishers; 5) disciplinary points; 6) coin toss or drawing of lots

==== Results summary ====
| Overall | | | | | | | | Home | | | | | | Away | | | | | |
| Pld | W | D | L | GF | GA | GD | Pts | W | D | L | GF | GA | GD | W | D | L | GF | GA | GD |
|---|---|---|---|---|---|---|---|---|---|---|---|---|---|---|---|---|---|---|---|
| 19 | 3 | 10 | 6 | 25 | 43 | −18 | 19 | 3 | 3 | 4 | 21 | 24 | −3 | 0 | 7 | 2 | 4 | 19 | −15 |

Last updated: June 26, 2019.
Source: USL

==== Results by matchday ====
| Matchday | 1 | 2 | 3 | 4 | 5 | 6 | 7 | 8 | 9 | 10 | 11 | 12 | 13 | 14 | 15 | 16 | 17 | 18 | 19 | 20 | 21 | 22 | 23 | 24 | 25 | 26 | 27 | 28 | 29 | 30 | 31 | 32 | 33 | 34 |
|---|---|---|---|---|---|---|---|---|---|---|---|---|---|---|---|---|---|---|---|---|---|---|---|---|---|---|---|---|---|---|---|---|---|---|
| Stadium | A | H | H | H | A | A | H | A | H | H | A | H | H | A | A | H | H | H | A | H | H | A | A | H | A | A | H | A | A | H | A | H | A | A |
| Result | L | D | L | L | D | L | W | L | D | D | L | L | D | L | D | W | L | W | L | D | L | L | L | L | | | | | | | | | | |
| Position | 14 | 14 | 17 | 16 | 17 | 17 | 17 | 17 | 17 | 17 | 17 | 17 | 18 | 18 | 18 | 16 | 17 | 16 | 16 | 17 | 18 | 18 | 18 | 18 | | | | | | | | | | |

Updated to match(es) played on 7 July 2019. Source: USL
A = Away; H = Home; W = Win; D = Draw; L = Loss

==== Matches ====
Win Draw Loss Upcoming

| March 9, 2019 USLC 1 | New York Red Bulls II | 3–1 | Swope Park Rangers | Montclair, New Jersey |
| 12:00 PM | Barlow 26,62'; Epps 55' | Report | Bilyeu (yellow card) 18'; Hernandez 44'; Colombie (yellow card) 73' | Stadium: MSU Soccer Park; Attendance: 727; Referee: J.C. Griggs |

| March 23, 2019 USLC 2 | Swope Park Rangers | 2–2 | Pittsburgh Riverhounds SC | Kansas City, Kansas |
| 4:00 PM | Colombie (yellow card) 70'; Wallace 83'; Rowe 88', (yellow card) 90+4'; Abualnadi (red card) 90' | Report | Dabo (yellow card) 33'; Adewole 71'; Velarde 90+1' (pen.) | Stadium: Children's Mercy Park; Attendance: 432; Referee: Guido Gonzales, Jr. |

| April 6, 2019 USLC 3 | Swope Park Rangers | 3–4 | Bethlehem Steel FC | Kansas City, Kansas |
| 4:00 PM | Vanacore-Decker 19'; Mbekeli 44', 57'; Riley (yellow card) 49'; Segbers (yellow card) 70' | Report | Rayyan (yellow card) 24'; Moumbagna 27'; Fontana (yellow card) 64'; Real (yellow card) 68' (yellow-red card) 90+1'; Ofeimu 73'; Segbers 76' (o.g.); Santos 90+3' | Stadium: Children's Mercy Park; Attendance: 486; Referee: Mike Lavergne |

| April 15, 2019 USLC 4 | Swope Park Rangers | 1–3 | Indy Eleven | Kansas City, Kansas |
| 7:00 PM | Harris 26'; Kuzain (yellow card) 30'; Mbekeli (yellow card) 61' | Report | Kelly 2', (yellow card) 33', (goal) 53'; Enevoldsen 6'; Crognale (yellow card) 41' | Stadium: Children's Mercy Park; Attendance: 232; Referee: Kevin Broadley |

| April 20, 2019 USLC 5 | Birmingham Legion FC | 0–0 | Swope Park Rangers | Birmingham, Alabama |
| 4:00 PM | Fisher (yellow card) 38'; Culbertson (yellow card) 53'; Laurent (yellow card) 57'; Herivaux (yellow card) 72' | Report | Hernandez (yellow card) 44' | Stadium: BBVA Compass Field; Attendance: 4,872; Referee: Elvis Osmanovic |

| April 27, 2019 USLC 6 | Saint Louis FC | 3–1 | Swope Park Rangers | Fenton, Missouri |
| 7:30 PM | Jepson 42'; Cicerone 47'; Greig (yellow card) 82', (goal) 84' | Preview | Andrade 65'; Colombie (yellow card) 80' | Stadium: Toyota Stadium; Attendance: 4,076; Referee: Lukasz Szpala |

| May 6, 2019 USLC 7 | Swope Park Rangers | 3–2 | Louisville City FC | Kansas City, Kansas |
| 7:00 PM | Hernandez 30'; Akhmatov 34', (yellow card) 45+2'; Rwatubyaye 90' | Report | Rasmussen 49'; Spencer 58'; McCabe (red card) 88' | Stadium: Children's Mercy Park; Attendance: 214; Referee: Rosendo Mendoza |

| May 11, 2019 USLC 8 | Nashville SC | 5–1 | Swope Park Rangers | Nashville, Tennessee |
| 7:00 PM | Ríos 5', 14'; Winn 16'; Belmar 55'; Tribbett (yellow card) 65'; Moloto (yellow card) 79'; Lancaster 89' | Report | Mbekeli (yellow card) 42'; Hernandez 61'; Riley (yellow card) 70' | Stadium: First Tennessee Park; Attendance: 6,164; Referee: Calin Radosav |

| May 19, 2019 USLC 9 | Swope Park Rangers | 1–1 | Atlanta United 2 | Kansas City, Kansas |
| 4:00 PM | Hernandez 2'; Andrade (yellow card) 43'; Riley (yellow card) 73'; Karani (yellow card) 86' | Report | Campbell (yellow card) 23'; Wyke (yellow card) 29', (goal) 68'; Conway (yellow card) 90+1'; Hernández (yellow card) 90+6' | Stadium: Children's Mercy Park; Attendance: 419; Referee: Michael Radchuk |

| May 22, 2019 USLC 10 | Swope Park Rangers | 2–2 | Memphis 901 FC | Kansas City, Kansas |
| 7:00 PM | Riley 34' (pen.); Hernandez (yellow card) 59'; Segbers 68'; Vanacore-Decker (yellow card) 82' | Report | Metzger 3'; Najem (yellow card) 52'; Hodge 73'; Morton (yellow card) 90' | Stadium: Children's Mercy Park; Attendance: 311; Referee: Jon Freemon |

| May 25, 2019 USLC 11 | Tampa Bay Rowdies | 1–0 | Swope Park Rangers | St. Petersburg, Florida |
| 6:30 PM | Hoppenot (yellow card) 81'; Fernandes 82' (pen.) | Report | Harris (yellow card) 78'; Alexsander (yellow card) 81'; Akhmatov (yellow card) 83' | Stadium: Al Lang Stadium; Attendance: 5,688; Referee: Thomas Snyder |

| June 5, 2019 USLC 12 | Swope Park Rangers | 2–3 | Loudoun United FC | Kansas City, Kansas |
| 7:00 PM | Hernandez 13'; Harris 45+2' | Report | Murphy 6'; Yow 39' (yellow card) 45+1'; Presley 87' | Stadium: Children's Mercy Park; Attendance: 529; Referee: Danielle Chesky |

| June 8, 2019 USLC 13 | Swope Park Rangers | 0–0 | Charlotte Independence | Kansas City, Kansas |
| 4:00 PM | Segbers (yellow card) 80' | Report | Gutman (yellow card) 34'; Taku (yellow card) 36' | Stadium: Children's Mercy Park; Attendance: 592; Referee: Ismir Pekmic |

| June 15, 2019 USLC 14 | North Carolina FC | 2–0 | Swope Park Rangers | Cary, North Carolina |
| 6:00 PM | Chester 6', (yellow card) 28'; Fortune 13'; Guillén (yellow card) 50' | Report | Andrade (yellow card) 63' | Stadium: WakeMed Soccer Park; Attendance: 6,172; Referee: Eric Tattersall |

| June 22, 2019 USLC 15 | Charleston Battery | 1–1 | Swope Park Rangers | Charleston, South Carolina |
| 6:30 PM | Piggott 62'; Svantesson (red card) 90+3' | Report | Segbers (yellow card) 11'; Zendejas (yellow card) 45+2' (yellow-red card) 90+4'; Mbekeli (yellow card) 59'; Hernandez 82' | Stadium: MUSC Health Stadium; Attendance: 1,782; Referee: Matt Franz |

| June 30, 2019 USLC 16 | Swope Park Rangers | 2–1 | Saint Louis FC | Kansas City, Kansas |
| 4:00 PM | Hernandez 21', (red card) 90'; Smith (yellow card) 45'; Mbekeli (yellow card) 69'; Vanacore-Decker 82'; Segbers (yellow card) 90' | Report | Martz (yellow card) 45+3'; Dacres 78'; Kamdem (yellow card) 90+1' | Stadium: Children's Mercy Park; Attendance: 531; Referee: Lorant Varga |

| July 7, 2019 USLC 17 | Swope Park Rangers | 1–3 | Tampa Bay Rowdies | Kansas City, Kansas |
| 4:00 PM | Kuzain (yellow card) 37'; Smith (yellow card) 38'; Segbers (yellow card) 45+3'; Vanacore-Decker 72' | Report | Tejada 14'; Guenzatti 39' (pen.); Steinberger (yellow card) 45+1'; Johnson (yellow card) 54', (goal) 58'; Diakité (yellow card) 62' | Stadium: Children's Mercy Park; Attendance: 507; Referee: Mark Allatin |

| July 17, 2019 USLC 18 | Swope Park Rangers | 4–3 | Hartford Athletic | Kansas City, Kansas |
| 7:00 PM | Hernandez 7'; Rowe 27', 30', (yellow card) 63'; Freeman 50'; Karani (yellow card) 61'; Riley (yellow card) 64'; Segbers (yellow card) 75' | Report | Barrera (yellow card) 45+2'; Riley 46' (o.g.); Dixon 58'; Davey (yellow card) 69'; Curinga (yellow card) 71'; Steeves 74'; Rasmussen (yellow card) 90+3' | Stadium: Children's Mercy Park; Attendance: 521; Referee: Kevin Broadley |

| July 20, 2019 USLC 19 | Ottawa Fury FC | 4–0 | Swope Park Rangers | Ottawa, Ontario, Canada |
| 6:00 PM | Mannella (yellow card) 30'; Oliveira 39'; François 41'; Fall 48' (pen.), (yellow card) 77'; Haworth 57', (yellow card) 79'; Gagnon-Laparé (yellow card) 89' | Report | Allach (yellow card) 74' | Stadium: TD Place Stadium; Attendance: 4,636; Referee: Sebastian Noshinravani |

| July 27, 2019 USLC 20 | Swope Park Rangers | P–P | Charleston Battery | Kansas City, Kansas |
| 7:00 PM | | | | Stadium: Children's Mercy Park |
Note: Match postponed due to Charleston team bus accident.

| August 3, 2019 USLC 21 | Swope Park Rangers | 0–2 | Nashville SC | Kansas City, Kansas |
| 7:00 PM | Andrade (yellow card) 66'; Allach (yellow card) 81' | Report | Moloto 43'; Ríos 47' | Stadium: Children's Mercy Park; Attendance: 638; Referee: Farhad Dadkho |

| August 10, 2019 USLC 22 | Pittsburgh Riverhounds SC | 3–2 | Swope Park Rangers | Pittsburgh, Pennsylvania |
| 6:00 PM | Volesky 7'; Velarde (yellow card) 37', (goal) 51'; Mertz (yellow card) 45'; Brett 47'; James (yellow card) 56'; Dover (yellow card) 78' | Report | Riley (yellow card) 19'; Zelalem 33' (pen.); Zé Pedro 67' | Stadium: Highmark Stadium; Attendance: 3,817; Referee: Alejandro Mariscal |

| August 16, 2019 USLC 23 | Atlanta United 2 | 2–1 | Swope Park Rangers | Kennesaw, Georgia |
| 6:30 PM | Campbell (yellow card) 34'; Bello (yellow card) 36'; Conway 58'; Davis 74' (o.g.) | Report | Harris 87'; Riley (yellow card) 90+4' | Stadium: Fifth Third Bank Stadium; Attendance: 1,760; Referee: Jonathan Bilinski |

| August 24, 2019 USLC 24 | Swope Park Rangers | 1–5 | New York Red Bulls II | Kansas City, Kansas |
| 7:00 PM | Harris 13'; Andrade (yellow card) 15' (yellow-red card) 25'; Hernandez (yellow card) 70' | Report | McSherry 7', 40'; Rito 45'; Scarlett (yellow card) 48'; Stroud 51'; Sowe (yellow card) 73'; Duncan (yellow card) 75' | Stadium: Children's Mercy Park; Attendance: 498; Referee: Sergii Demianchuk |

| September 1, 2019 USLC 25 | Bethlehem Steel FC | 2–0 | Swope Park Rangers | Bethlehem, Pennsylvania |
| 6:00 PM | Ngalina (yellow card) 33', (goal) 36'; Topey (yellow card) 39' (yellow-red card) 84'; Zandi 75' | Report | Hernandez (yellow card) 14'; Allach (yellow card) 34'; Clarke (yellow card) 82' | Stadium: Talen Energy Stadium; Attendance: 329; Referee: Eric Tattersall |

| September 7, 2019 USLC 26 | Memphis 901 FC | 4–2 | Swope Park Rangers | Memphis, Tennessee |
| 7:00 PM | Charpie (yellow card) 34' da Silva 38'; Morton 40'; Metzger (yellow card) 53'; Allen 67', 77'; Burch (yellow card) 70' | Report | Harris 35' (pen.); Segbers (yellow card) 43'; Zé Pedro 50'; Allach (yellow card) 86' | Stadium: Autozone Park; Attendance: 6,036; Referee: Lukasz Szpala |

| September 11, 2019 USLC 20 | Swope Park Rangers | 0–0 | Charleston Battery | Kansas City, Kansas |
| 7:00 PM | Jaylin (yellow card) 74' | Report | Mueller (yellow card) 87' | Stadium: Children's Mercy Park; Attendance: 312; Referee: Brad Jensen |
Note: Reschedule of postponed 27 July match.

| September 14, 2019 USLC 27 | Swope Park Rangers | 1–0 | North Carolina FC | Kansas City, Kansas |
| 4:00 PM | Harris 58'; Akhmatov (yellow card) 90+2' | Report | Perez (yellow card) 88' da Luz (yellow card) 90+1' | Stadium: Children's Mercy Park; Attendance: 429; Referee: Tori Penso |

| September 21, 2019 USLC 28 | Charlotte Independence | 0–3 | Swope Park Rangers | Matthews, North Carolina |
| 6:00 PM | A. Martínez (yellow card) 71' | Report | Jaylin (yellow card) 1'; Harris 29', 57'; Allach (yellow card) 73'; Kuzain 87' | Stadium: Sportsplex at Matthews; Attendance: 1,267; Referee: Danielle Chesky |

| September 25, 2019 USLC 29 | Loudoun United FC | 4–1 | Swope Park Rangers | Leesburg, Virginia |
| 6:30 PM | Wild 10', 43', 85' (pen.); Ku-DiPietro 68', (red card) 90'; Gorskie (yellow card) 81' | Report | Akhmatov (yellow card) 33'; Harris 37' (pen.), (yellow card) 40'; Vanacore-Decker (red card) 90' | Stadium: Loudoun United Stadium; Referee: Natalie Simon |

| September 30, 2019 USLC 30 | Swope Park Rangers | 3–1 | Birmingham Legion FC | Kansas City, Kansas |
| 7:00 PM | Harris 7'; Allach 28' (pen.), (yellow card) 65'; Lepley (yellow card) 77'; Zé Pedro 79'; Dick (yellow card) 90' | Report | Williams 45'; Culbertson (yellow card) 62'; Wright (red card) 76'; Asiedu (yellow card) 80' | Stadium: Children's Mercy Park; Attendance: 369; Referee: Lorant Varga |

| October 5, 2019 USLC 31 | Hartford Athletic | 2–2 | Swope Park Rangers | Hartford, Connecticut |
| 6:00 PM | Swartz (yellow card) 45'; Lee (yellow card) 45+2'; Williams 57'; Barrera 62'; Gdula (yellow card) 83'; Downs (yellow card) 89'; Gentile (yellow card) 90+4' | Report | Zé Pedro (yellow card) 31'; Harris (yellow card) 33', (goal) 90+7'; Lepley (yellow card) 41'; Allach 67' | Stadium: Dillon Stadium; Attendance: 5,012; Referee: Jonathan Bilinski |

| October 8, 2019 USLC 32 | Swope Park Rangers | 1–2 | Ottawa Fury FC | Kansas City, Kansas |
| 7:00 PM | Akhmatov (yellow card) 24'; Clarke (yellow card) 37' (yellow-red card) 45'; Zé Pedro (yellow card) 50', (goal) 85'; Kuzain (yellow card) 62' | Report | Fall 45+2' (pen.), (yellow card) 57'; Ward (yellow card) 82'; Oliveira 89' | Stadium: Children's Mercy Park; Attendance: 1,565; Referee: Gabriele Giusti |

| October 12, 2019 USLC 33 | Louisville City FC | 8–3 | Swope Park Rangers | Louisville, Kentucky |
| 6:00 PM | Matsoso 36'; Souahy 40'; Hoppenot 43', (yellow card) 81'; Ownby 54'; Rasmussen 72', 78'; DelPiccolo (yellow card) 84'; Ballard 85'; Davis 88' | Report | Zé Pedro 7'; Busio 19', (yellow card) 45+1'; Vanacore-Decker 34'; Allach (yellow card) 61'; Hernandez (yellow card) 73' | Stadium: Louisville Slugger Field; Attendance: 12,188; Referee: Eric Tattersall |

| October 16, 2019 USLC 34 | Indy Eleven | 2–1 | Swope Park Rangers | Indianapolis, Indiana |
| 6:00 PM | Osmond (yellow card) 23'; Conner (yellow card) 40'; Kelly 56', 67'; Hackshaw (yellow card) 61' | Report | Zé Pedro (yellow card) 16'; Vanacore-Decker (yellow card) 29'; Hernandez (yellow card) 37'; Harris 57' | Stadium: Lucas Oil Stadium; Attendance: 10,251; Referee: Chris Ruska |

=== U.S. Open Cup ===
Due to their affiliation with a higher division professional club (Sporting Kansas City), SPR was one of 13 teams expressly forbidden from entering the Cup competition.

== Player statistics ==
=== Squad appearances and goals ===
Last updated on 26 August 2019.

| No. | Pos | Nat | Player | Total | | USL Championship | | Playoffs | |
| No. | Pos | Nat | Player | Apps | Goals | Apps | Goals | Apps | Goals |
Goalkeepers
| 1 | GK | (United States) USA | Adrian Zendejas | 8 | 0 | 8 | 0 | 0 | 0 |
| 45 | GK | (United States) USA | John Pulskamp | 7 | 0 | 7 | 0 | 0 | 0 |
| 18 | GK | (United States) USA | Eric Dick | 6 | 0 | 6 | 0 | 0 | 0 |
| 67 | GK | (United States) USA | Max Trejo | 1 | 0 | 1 | 0 | 0 | 0 |
| 31 | GK | (United States) USA | Brooks Thomson | 1 | 0 | 1 | 0 | 0 | 0 |
Defenders
| 92 | DF | (Brazil) BRA | Alexsander Andrade | 22 | 1 | 22 | 1 | 0 | 0 |
| 43 | DF | (United States) USA | Mark Segbers | 21 | 1 | 18+3 | 1 | 0 | 0 |
| 44 | DF | (United States) USA | Camden Riley | 19 | 1 | 18+1 | 1 | 0 | 0 |
| 16 | DF | (United States) USA | Graham Smith | 13 | 0 | 13 | 0 | 0 | 0 |
| 48 | DF | (United States) USA | Kavah Rad | 13 | 0 | 11+2 | 0 | 0 | 0 |
| 26 | DF | (United States) USA | Jaylin Lindsey | 5 | 0 | 4+1 | 0 | 0 | 0 |
| 60 | DF | (United States) USA | Mo Abualnadi | 4 | 0 | 4 | 0 | 0 | 0 |
| 22 | DF | (Costa Rica) CRC | Rodney Wallace | 1 | 1 | 1 | 1 | 0 | 0 |
| 94 | DF | (United States) USA | Jimmy Medranda | 2 | 0 | 2 | 0 | 0 | 0 |
| 2 | DF | (Hungary) HUN | Botond Baráth | 1 | 0 | 1 | 0 | 0 | 0 |
| 33 | DF | (Jamaica) JAM | Rennico Clarke | 1 | 0 | 0+1 | 0 | 0 | 0 |
| 50 | DF | (United States) USA | Dylan Hooper | 0 | 0 | 0 | 0 | 0 | 0 |
Midfielders
| 85 | MF | (United States) USA | Felipe Hernandez | 21 | 8 | 20+1 | 8 | 0 | 0 |
| 75 | MF | (United States) USA | Wan Kuzain | 15 | 0 | 13+2 | 0 | 0 | 0 |
| 39 | MF | (Cameroon) CMR | Jerome Ngom Mbekeli | 18 | 2 | 12+6 | 2 | 0 | 0 |
| 98 | MF | (Morocco) MAR | Ayyoub Allach | 16 | 0 | 11+5 | 0 | 0 | 0 |
| 49 | MF | (United States) USA | Will Little | 13 | 0 | 10+3 | 0 | 0 | 0 |
| 95 | MF | (Russia) RUS | Rassambek Akhmatov | 10 | 1 | 7+3 | 1 | 0 | 0 |
| 24 | MF | (United States) USA | Gedion Zelalem | 7 | 1 | 7 | 1 | 0 | 0 |
| 64 | MF | (United States) USA | Jake Davis | 3 | 0 | 2+1 | 0 | 0 | 0 |
| 84 | MF | (United States) USA | Jahon Rad | 3 | 0 | 1+2 | 0 | 0 | 0 |
| 17 | MF | (Honduras) HON | Roger Espinoza | 1 | 0 | 1 | 0 | 0 | 0 |
| 47 | MF | (United States) USA | Tucker Lepley | 1 | 0 | 0+1 | 0 | 0 | 0 |
| 77 | MF | (United States) USA | Camilo Benitez | 0 | 0 | 0 | 0 | 0 | 0 |
Forwards
| 91 | FW | (United States) USA | Ethan Vanacore-Decker | 20 | 3 | 12+8 | 3 | 0 | 0 |
| 96 | FW | (United States) USA | Wilson Harris | 16 | 4 | 11+5 | 4 | 0 | 0 |
| 53 | FW | (United States) USA | Killian Colombie | 17 | 0 | 7+10 | 0 | 0 | 0 |
| 80 | FW | (United States) USA | Sean Karani | 12 | 0 | 4+8 | 0 | 0 | 0 |
| 23 | FW | (United States) USA | Tyler Freeman | 8 | 1 | 7+1 | 1 | 0 | 0 |
| 13 | FW | (United States) USA | Gianluca Busio | 4 | 0 | 4 | 0 | 0 | 0 |
| 70 | FW | (Portugal) POR | Zé Pedro | 3 | 1 | 3 | 1 | 0 | 0 |
| 19 | FW | (United States) USA | Erik Hurtado | 1 | 0 | 1 | 0 | 0 | 0 |
| 63 | FW | (United States) USA | Tucker Stephenson | 0 | 0 | 0 | 0 | 0 | 0 |
| 79 | FW | (Ghana) GHA | William Opoku Mensah | 0 | 0 | 0 | 0 | 0 | 0 |
Players who have made an appearance or had a squad number this season but have left the club
| 3 | DF | (Rwanda) RWA | Abdul Rwatubyaye | 1 | 1 | 1 | 1 | 0 | 0 |
| 42 | DF | (United States) USA | Justin Bilyeu | 1 | 0 | 1 | 0 | 0 | 0 |
| 11 | MF | (United States) USA | Kelyn Rowe | 2 | 3 | 2 | 3 | 0 | 0 |

=== Top scorers ===
| Number | Position | Name | USLC | Playoffs | Total |
|---|---|---|---|---|---|
| 85 | MF | (United States) Felipe Hernandez | 8 | 0 | 8 |
| 96 | FW | (United States) Wilson Harris | 4 | 0 | 4 |
| 11 | MF | (United States) Kelyn Rowe | 3 | 0 | 3 |
| 91 | FW | (United States) Ethan Vanacore-Decker | 3 | 0 | 3 |
| 39 | DF | (Cameroon) Jerome Ngom Mbekeli | 2 | 0 | 2 |
| 43 | DF | (United States) Mark Segbers | 1 | 0 | 1 |
| 92 | DF | (Brazil) Alexsander Andrade | 1 | 0 | 1 |
| 44 | DF | (United States) Camden Riley | 1 | 0 | 1 |
| 95 | MF | (Russia) Rassambek Akhmatov | 1 | 0 | 1 |
| 70 | FW | (Portugal) Zé Pedro | 1 | 0 | 1 |
| 24 | MF | (United States) Gedion Zelalem | 1 | 0 | 1 |
| 23 | FW | (United States) Tyler Freeman | 1 | 0 | 1 |
| 22 | DF | (Costa Rica) Rodney Wallace | 1 | 0 | 1 |
| 3 | DF | (Rwanda) Abdul Rwatubyaye | 1 | 0 | 1 |
