= 2019 Sporting Kansas City season =

Sporting Kansas City
2019 season
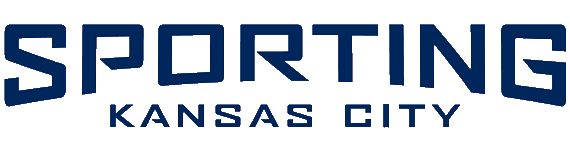
- Owner: Sporting Club
- Head coach: Peter Vermes
- Stadium: Children's Mercy Park
- MLS: Conference: 11th Overall: 21st
- Playoffs: Did not qualify
- U.S. Open Cup: Fourth round
- CONCACAF Champions League: Semifinals
- Top goalscorer: League: Felipe Gutiérrez (12); All: Krisztián Németh (10)
- Highest home attendance: League/All: 19,979 (May 29 vs. LA Galaxy)
- Lowest home attendance: League: 17,083 (August 22 vs. Minnesota United FC); All: 13,927 (Feb. 21 vs. Toluca)
- Average home league attendance: League: 18,856; All: 18,325
- Biggest win: 7–1 (March 30 vs. Montreal)
- Biggest defeat: 0–5 (April 4 vs. Monterrey, CCL SF); 2–7 (September 15 at LA Galaxy)
Home colors	Away colors

The 2019 Sporting Kansas City season was the twenty-fourth season of the team's existence in Major League Soccer and the ninth year played under the Sporting Kansas City moniker.

It was the first season since 2010 where Sporting did not qualify for the playoffs.

== Summary ==
=== Preseason ===
Sporting Kansas City opened its preseason camp in Scottsdale, Arizona, in early January to prepare for the CONCACAF Champions League. Players slept in specialized tents on their beds that would simulate higher-elevation air pressure in order to adjust their bodies for a high-elevation match in Toluca, Mexico.

== Roster ==
Note: Flags indicate national team as defined under FIFA eligibility rules; some limited exceptions apply. Players may hold more than one non-FIFA nationality. Squad correct as of August 16, 2019.

No.	Pos.	Nation	Player
1	GK	USA	Adrián Zendejas
2	DF	HUN	Botond Baráth
4	DF	ESP	Andreu Fontas
5	DF	USA	Matt Besler (Captain)
6	MF	ESP	Ilie Sánchez
7	FW	SCO	Johnny Russell
8	DF	USA	Graham Zusi
9	FW	HUN	Krisztián Németh
10	MF	FRA	Yohan Croizet (DP)
12	FW	GNB	Gerso Fernandes
13	FW	USA	Gianluca Busio (HGP)
14	DF	LIE	Nicolas Hasler
15	DF	USA	Seth Sinovic
16	DF	USA	Graham Smith
17	MF	HON	Roger Espinoza (DP)
18	GK	USA	Eric Dick
19	FW	USA	Erik Hurtado
20	FW	HUN	Dániel Sallói (HGP)
21	MF	CHI	Felipe Gutiérrez (DP)
22	DF	CRC	Rodney Wallace
23	FW	USA	Tyler Freeman (HGP)
24	MF	USA	Gedion Zelalem
26	DF	USA	Jaylin Lindsey (HGP)
28	DF	USA	Cameron Duke (HGP)
29	GK	USA	Tim Melia
30	MF	USA	Benny Feilhaber
36	DF	POR	Luís Martins
44	DF	USA	Camden Riley
75	MF	MAS	Wan Kuzain
85	MF	COL	Felipe Hernandez
94	MF	COL	Jimmy Medranda

== Player movement ==
=== In ===
Per Major League Soccer and club policies terms of the deals do not get disclosed.

Date	Player	Position	Previous club	Fee/notes	Ref
December 14, 2018	(Costa Rica) Rodney Wallace	DF	(United States) New York City	Free Agent	
December 14, 2018	(United States) Erik Hurtado	FW	(Canada) Vancouver Whitecaps FC	Trade	
December 18, 2018	(Hungary) Botond Baráth	DF	(Hungary) Honvéd	Signing, No Transfer Fee	
December 18, 2018	(United States) Kelyn Rowe	MF	(United States) New England Revolution	Three way trade in exchange for Diego Rubio	
February 5, 2019	(Rwanda) Abdul Rwatubyaye	DF	(Rwanda) Rayon Sports	Signing	
March 11, 2019	(United States) Gedion Zelalem	MF	(England) Arsenal	Transfer	
April 2, 2019	(Liechtenstein) Nicolas Hasler	DF	(United States) Chicago Fire	Signing	
May 8, 2019	(United States) Benny Feilhaber	MF	(United States) Colorado Rapids	Trade	
July 18, 2019	(United States) Cameron Duke	MF		Homegrown Player	
August 1, 2019	(Portugal) Luís Martins	DF	(Portugal) Chaves	signing	
August 30, 2019	(United States) Felipe Hernandez	MF	Swope Park Rangers	signing	

==== Draft picks ====
Draft picks are not automatically signed to the team roster. Only trades involving draft picks and executed after the start of 2019 MLS SuperDraft will be listed in the notes.

Round	Pick Number	Player	Position	School
1	21	(United States) Kamar Marriott	DF	Florida Gulf Coast
2	45	(United States) Camden Riley	MF	University of the Pacific
3	69	(United States) Franky Martinez	DF	UMass Lowell

=== Out ===
Date	Player	Position	Destination club	Notes	Ref
November 30, 2018	(United States) Kharlton Belmar	FW	(United States) Nashville SC	Option Declined, Out of Contract	
November 30, 2018	(United States) Brad Evans	DF	Retired	Option Declined, Out of Contract	
November 30, 2018	(Spain) Cristian Lobato	MF	(Spain) UE Cornellà	Option Declined, Out of Contract	
November 30, 2018	(Canada) Amer Didic	DF	(United States) San Antonio FC	Option Declined, Out of Contract	
November 30, 2018	(United States) Colton Storm	DF	(United States) North Carolina FC	Option Declined, signed with North Carolina FC	
December 18, 2018	(Chile) Diego Rubio	FW	(United States) Colorado Rapids	Trade with New England Revolution and Colorado Rapids	
January 5, 2018	(United States) Khiry Shelton	FW	(Germany) SC Paderborn 07	Out of Contract	
January 28, 2018	(United States) Ike Opara	DF	(United States) Minnesota United FC	Traded to Minnesota United, $900,000 in Targeted Allocation Money (TAM) and $100,000 in potential TAM if Minnesota makes Playoffs	
May 8, 2019	(Rwanda) Abdul Rwatubyaye	DF	(United States) Colorado Rapids	Trade with Colorado Rapids. Received Benny Feilhaber. Sent Abdul, second round draft pick, International Roster Spot, $50,000 TAM.	
August 7, 2019	(United States) Kelyn Rowe	MF	(United States) Real Salt Lake	Traded to Real Salt Lake in exchange for $75,000 TAM and 2019 International Roster Spot (For Luis Martins)	

=== Short Term Agreements ===
Per Major League Soccer and club policies terms of the deals do not get disclosed.

==== In ====
Date	Player	Position	Loaned from	Notes	Ref
May 17, 2018	(United States) Wilson Harris	FW	Swope Park Rangers	Sporting Kansas City (MLS) signs Swope Park Rangers (USL Championship) forward Wilson Harris to a Short-Term Agreement for Saturday’s match against Vancouver Whitecaps FC.	
June 11, 2018	(United States) Felipe Hernandez	MF	Swope Park Rangers	Sporting KC (MLS) signs Swope Park Rangers midfielder Felipe Hernandez to Short-Term Agreements through Wednesday’s Lamar Hunt U.S. Open Cup match against Minnesota United FC.	
June 11, 2018	(United States) Camden Riley	DF	Swope Park Rangers	Sporting KC (MLS) signs Swope Park Rangers defender Camden Riley to Short-Term Agreements through Wednesday’s Lamar Hunt U.S. Open Cup match against Minnesota United FC.	

=== Loans ===
Per Major League Soccer and club policies terms of the deals do not get disclosed.

==== Out ====
Date	Player	Position	Loaned to	Notes	Ref
June 27, 2018	(United States) Eric Dick	GK	Tulsa Roughnecks FC	Sporting Kansas City (MLS) loans Tulsa Roughnecks FC (USL Championship) goalkeeper Eric Dick for Saturday’s match against Real Monarchs SLC.	

== Competitions ==
=== Preseason ===
Kickoff times are in CST (UTC-06) unless shown otherwise

January 18, 2019 1	Sporting Arizona FC	0–4	Sporting Kansas City	Scottsdale, Arizona
11:30 AM		Report	Russell 23'; Croizet 59'; Bilyeu 68'; Hernandez 85'	Stadium: Phoenix Rising FC Soccer Complex
Note: Three 30-minute periods.

January 23, 2019 2	Phoenix Rising FC Trialists	0–7	Sporting Kansas City	Scottsdale, Arizona
11:30 AM		Report	Németh 33' (pen.); Rowe 41'; Sallói 57'; Sinovic 89'; Harris 91', 92'; Freeman 94'	Stadium: Phoenix Rising FC Soccer Complex
Note: Two 45-minute periods, and one 30-minute period.

January 30, 2019 3a	FC Tucson Trialists	0–6	Sporting Kansas City	Scottsdale, Arizona
12:00 PM		Report	Rowe 21', 54'; Zusi 23'; Németh 40', 52'; Russell 44'	Stadium: Phoenix Rising FC Soccer Complex
Note: Three 60 Minute games

January 30, 2019 3b	FC Tucson Trialists	0–3	Sporting Kansas City	Scottsdale, Arizona
1:15 PM			Croizet 12' (pen.); Busio 16'; Hurtado 27'	Stadium: Phoenix Rising FC Soccer Complex
Note: Three 60 Minute games

January 30, 2019 3c	FC Arizona	0–0	Sporting Kansas City	Scottsdale, Arizona
2:30 PM				Stadium: Phoenix Rising FC Soccer Complex
Note: Three 60 Minute games

==== Mobile Mini Sun Cup ====
Kickoff times are in CST (UTC-06) unless shown otherwise

February 7, 2019	Phoenix Rising FC	1–2	Sporting Kansas City	Phoenix, Arizona
7:00 PM	Neagle 70'	Report	Russell 56'; Zusi 72'	Stadium: Phoenix Rising FC Soccer Complex
Note: First of two 75-minute matches.

February 7, 2019	Phoenix Rising FC	1–1 (2–3 agg.)	Sporting Kansas City	Phoenix, Arizona
7:00 PM	Lambert 28'	Report	Freeman 1'	Stadium: Phoenix Rising FC Soccer Complex
Note: Second of two 75-minute matches.

February 13, 2019	Houston Dynamo	1–4	Sporting Kansas City	Tucson, Arizona
5:00 PM	Alberth Elis 4'; Quioto (red card) 73'; Cabezas (yellow card) 38'	Report	Russell 11'; Gutiérrez 23'; Németh 28', 90+1' (yellow card) 33'; Espinoza (yellow card) 80' (yellow-red card) 87'	Stadium: Kino Sports Complex
Note: Matches played concurrently

February 13, 2019	Houston Dynamo	1–1	Sporting Kansas City	Tucson, Arizona
5:00 PM	Rodriguez 52'	Report	Croizet 45'	Stadium: Kino Sports Complex
Note: Matches played concurrently

=== CONCACAF Champions League ===
==== Round of 16 ====
Kickoff times are in CST (UTC-06) unless shown otherwise

February 21, 2019 First leg	Sporting Kansas City (United States)	3–0	(Mexico) Toluca	Kansas City, United States
7:00 PM	Németh 35' (Gerso); Gerso 52'; Ilie 72'; Sinovic (yellow card) 86'	Report	(yellow card) 39' Salinas; (yellow card) 83' González	Stadium: Children's Mercy Park; Attendance: 13,927; Referee: Henry Bejarano

February 28, 2019 Second leg	Toluca (Mexico)	0–2 (0–5 agg.)	(United States) Sporting Kansas City	Toluca, Mexico
9:00 PM	Barrientos (yellow card) 11'; Mora (red card) 61'	Report	Fernandes 8' (Espinoza); Németh 62' (pen.)	Stadium: Estadio Nemesio Díez; Attendance: 14,519; Referee: Mario Escobar

==== Quarterfinals ====
Kickoff times are in CST (UTC-06) unless shown otherwise

March 6, 2019 First leg	Independiente (Panama)	2–1	(United States) Sporting Kansas City	La Chorrera, Panama
7:00 PM	Ivey 39'; Corpas 59'	Report	Ilie 51' (pen.); Sallói (yellow card) 63'	Stadium: Estadio Agustín Sánchez; Referee: Fernando Guerrero Ramirez

March 14, 2019 Second leg	Sporting Kansas City (United States)	3–0 (4–2 agg.)	(Panama) Independiente	Kansas City, United States
7:00 PM	Gutiérrez (yellow card) 57'; Németh 74', 86' (yellow card) 83'; Espinoza 81'		Vence (yellow card) 29'; Ayarza (yellow card) 35'; Guerra (yellow card) 64'	Stadium: Children's Mercy Park; Referee: Joel Aguilar (El Salvador)

==== Semifinals ====
Kickoff times are in CST (UTC-06) unless shown otherwise

April 4, 2019 First leg	Monterrey (Mexico)	5–0	(United States) Sporting Kansas City	Guadalupe, Mexico
9:00 PM	Pabón 7', 76'; Hurtado 14'; Sánchez (yellow card) 49', (goal) 70' (pen.); Gallardo 55'; Montes (yellow card) 67'	Report	Fontàs (yellow card) 30'; Zusi (yellow card) 58'	Stadium: Estadio BBVA Bancomer; Referee: Mario Escobar

April 11, 2019 Second leg	Sporting Kansas City (United States)	2–5 (2–10 agg.)	(Mexico) Monterrey	Kansas City, United States
8:00 PM	Gerso 6', 29'; Gutiérrez (yellow card) 26'; Ilie (yellow card) 60'	Report	Funes Mori 20', 90+1'; Montes (yellow card) 36'; Pizarro 39'; Layún 61'; Hurtado 82'	Stadium: Children's Mercy Park; Attendance: 18,467; Referee: Joel Aguilar

=== U.S. Open Cup ===
June 12, 2019 4th Round	Minnesota United FC	4–1	Sporting Kansas City	Saint Paul, Minnesota
7:00 p.m. CST	Rodríguez 2'; Olum (yellow card) 39'; Finlay 46'; Quintero 55', 67'; Martin (yellow card) 72'; Dotson (yellow card) 85'	Report	Gerso 27'; Gutiérrez (yellow card) 43'	Stadium: Allianz Field; Attendance: 7,211; Referee: Guido Gonzales, Jr.

Win Tie Loss

=== Regular season ===
Kickoff times are in CDT (UTC-06) unless shown otherwise

March 3, 2019 1	Los Angeles FC	2–1	Sporting Kansas City	Los Angeles, California
7:00 PM	Rossi 47' (Atuesta); Harvey (yellow card) 66'; Blessing (yellow card) 81'; Atuesta (yellow card) 89'; Diomande 90+4' (Harvey)	Report	Gutiérrez (yellow card) 10'; Németh 16' (Russell), (yellow card) 42'; Gerso (yellow card) 17'; Sinovic (yellow card) 27'; Espinoza (yellow card) 31' (yellow-red card) 84'; Zusi (yellow card) 51'	Stadium: Banc of California Stadium; Attendance: 22,099; Referee: Robert Sibiga
Note: Season Opener

March 10, 2019 2	Sporting Kansas City	2–0	Philadelphia Union	Kansas City, Kansas
2:00 PM	Ilie 11' (pen.); Zusi (yellow card) 22'; Busio (yellow card) 37'; Elliott 80' (o.g.)	Report	Fabián (yellow card) 31' (red card) 60'	Stadium: Children's Mercy Park; Attendance: 18,738; Referee: Chris Penso
Note: Home Opener

March 17, 2019 3	Colorado Rapids	1–1	Sporting Kansas City	Commerce City, Colorado
8:00 PM	Kamara (yellow card) 53'; Rubio 54', (yellow card) 72'; Feilhaber (yellow card) 60'; Blomberg (yellow card) 80' (yellow-red card) 87'	Report	Gutiérrez (yellow card) 41'; Espinoza (yellow card) 64'; Baráth (yellow card) 75'; Russell 88'	Stadium: Dick's Sporting Goods Park; Attendance: 11,037; Referee: Allen Chapman

March 30, 2019 4	Sporting Kansas City	7–1	Montreal Impact	Kansas City, Kansas
2:00 PM	Russell 10', 50'; Nemeth 43', 68', 84'; Gutiérrez 45+2'; Busio 78'	Report	Lovitz (yellow card) 19'; Piette (yellow card) 22'; Saphir Taider 89'	Stadium: Children's Mercy Park; Attendance: 18,632; Referee: Nima Saghafi

April 7, 2019 5	FC Cincinnati	1–1	Sporting Kansas City	Cincinnati, Ohio
2:00 PM	Mattocks 19' (pen.); Garza (yellow card) 78'; Bertone (yellow card) 88'	Report	Fontas (yellow card) 18'; Croizet (yellow card) 35'; Zelalem (yellow card) 38'; Busio 62'; Baráth (yellow card) 90+3'	Stadium: Nippert Stadium; Attendance: 26,023; Referee: Ismail Elfath

April 14, 2019 6	Sporting Kansas City	2–2	New York Red Bulls	Kansas City, Kansas
6:00 PM	Russell 24'; Busio 88'; Rowe (yellow card) 89'; Németh (yellow card) 90+7'	Report	Royer 52'; Parker (yellow card) 53'; White 75'; Gamarra (red card) 90+4'; Robles (yellow card) 90+7'	Stadium: Children's Mercy Park; Attendance: 17,897; Referee: Robert Sibiga

April 20, 2019 7	San Jose Earthquakes	4–1	Sporting Kansas City	San Jose, California
9:00 PM	Hoesen 6', 12'; Espinoza (yellow card) 45+2'; Godoy (yellow card) 45+5'; Salinas 46'; Thompson (yellow card) 54'; Eriksson 61'	Report	Ilie (yellow card) 48'; Croizet (yellow card) 54'; Gutiérrez 66' (pen.)	Stadium: Avaya Stadium; Attendance: 15,777; Referee: Rubiel Vazquez

April 27, 2019 8	Sporting Kansas City	4–4	New England Revolution	Kansas City, Kansas
7:30 PM	Németh 33' (ZusiRowe), (yellow card) 67', (goal) 83' (Russell); Rwatubyaye (yellow card) 41'; Gutiérrez 60' (pen.), 70', (yellow card) 90+3'	Report	Caicedo 16' (AgudeloCaldwell), 35' (Buchanan); Agudelo 42'; Anibaba (yellow card) 43' (yellow-red card) 89'; Bye (yellow card) 45+1' (yellow-red card) 55'; Gil (yellow card) 49'; Jones 66'; Castillo (yellow card) 84'; Cropper (yellow card) 90+5'	Stadium: Children's Mercy Park; Attendance: 18,511; Referee: Baldomero Toledo

May 5, 2019 9	Sporting Kansas City	0–3	Atlanta United FC	Kansas City, Kansas
8:00 PM		Report	Martínez 39', 76'; Barco 47'; Remedi (yellow card) 66'	Stadium: Children's Mercy Park; Attendance: 18,518; Referee: Allen Chapman

May 12, 2019 10	D.C. United	1–0	Sporting Kansas City	Washington, D.C.
6:00 PM	Brillant (yellow card) 45'; Arriola 78'	Report	Sallói (yellow card) 11'	Stadium: Audi Field; Attendance: 12,521; Referee: Alan Kelly

May 18, 2019 11	Sporting Kansas City	1–1	Vancouver Whitecaps FC	Kansas City, Kansas
7:30 PM	Németh 37' (red card) 51'; Rowe (yellow card) 62'; Melia (yellow card) 87'	Report	Felipe (yellow card) 8'; Hwang (yellow card) 56'; Cornelius 90+4'; Venuto (yellow card) 90+5'	Stadium: Children's Mercy Park; Attendance: 18,691; Referee: Tim Ford

May 26, 2019 12	Sporting Kansas City	3–2	Seattle Sounders FC	Kansas City, Kansas
5:00 PM	Feilhaber (yellow card) 26'; Russell 29', 45+1', 68'; Croizet (yellow card) 34'	Report	Torres (yellow card) 13'; Lodeiro (yellow card) 60'; Ruidíaz 63'; Leerdam 71'	Stadium: Children's Mercy Park; Attendance: 19,882; Referee: Christopher Penso

May 29, 2019 13	Sporting Kansas City	0–2	LA Galaxy	Kansas City, Kansas
7:30 PM	Ilie (yellow card) 61'	Report	Gonzalez (yellow card) 33'; F. Álvarez 56'; Ibrahimovic 86'	Stadium: Children's Mercy Park; Attendance: 19,979; Referee: Robert Sibiga

June 1, 2019 14	Houston Dynamo	1–1	Sporting Kansas City	Houston, Texas
7:30 PM	Elis 69'	Report	Croizet 63'	Stadium: BBVA Compass Stadium; Attendance: 15,710; Referee: Kevin Stott

June 7, 2019 15	Toronto FC	2–2	Sporting Kansas City	Toronto, Ontario, Canada
7:00 PM	Nick DeLeon 43' (Morrow, Pozuelo); Laryea (yellow card) 57'; DeLeon (yellow card) 72'; Fraser (yellow card) 89'; Ciman (yellow card) 90+3'; Jordan Hamilton 90+5' (Telfer, Pozuelo)	Report	Gutiérrez 25' (pen.) 73' (pen.); Ilie (yellow card) 73'	Stadium: BMO Field; Attendance: 24,748; Referee: Fotis Bazakos

June 23, 2019 16	Columbus Crew	0–1	Sporting Kansas City	Columbus, Ohio
6:30 PM	Afful (red card) 74'; Crognale (yellow card) 76'; Sauro (yellow card) 79'	Report	Besler (yellow card) 45+1'; Gutiérrez 48' (Gerso, Feilhaber); Zusi (yellow card) 69'	Stadium: Mapfre Stadium; Attendance: 14,015; Referee: Allen Chapman

June 29, 2019 17	Real Salt Lake	2–0	Sporting Kansas City	Sandy, Utah
9:00 PM	Johnson 15', 29'; Beckerman (yellow card) 45+2'; Luiz (yellow card) 90+2'	Report	Sánchez (yellow card) 38'; Feilhaber (yellow card) 66'	Stadium: Rio Tinto Stadium; Attendance: 18,933; Referee: Nima Saghafi

July 3, 2019 18	Sporting Kansas City	1–5	Los Angeles Football Club	Kansas City, Kansas
7:30 PM	Besler (yellow card) 14'; Sinovic (yellow card) 34'; Ilie (yellow card) 38'; Gutiérrez (yellow card) 48'; Croizet 85'; Melia (yellow card) 89'	Report	Ramirez 28'; Blessing (yellow card) 45'; Rossi 50'; Kaye (yellow card) 57'; Vela 63'; Beitashour (yellow card) 80'; Zelaya 89'; El-Munir 90+1'	Stadium: Children's Mercy Park; Attendance: 19,754; Referee: Kevin Stott

July 6, 2019 19	Sporting Kansas City	1–0	Chicago Fire	Kansas City, Kansas
7:30 PM	Croizet 14'; Gutiérrez (yellow card) 67'; Baráth (yellow card) 88'	Report	Herbers (yellow card) 44'; McCarty (yellow card) 69'; Campos (yellow card) 83'; Schweinsteiger (yellow card) 90'	Stadium: Children's Mercy Park; Attendance: 18,570; Referee: Joseph Dickerson

July 13, 2019 20	Vancouver Whitecaps FC	0–3	Sporting Kansas City	Vancouver, British Columbia, Canada
9:00 PM	PC (yellow card) 48'; Henry (yellow card) 81'; Godoy (yellow card) 90'; Adnan (yellow card) 90+4'	Report	Adnan 24' (o.g.); Gutiérrez 56'; Sánchez (yellow card) 68'; Sinovic (yellow card) 75'; Gerso 90'	Stadium: BC Place; Attendance: 18,700; Referee: Ramy Touchan

July 20, 2019 21	Sporting Kansas City	0–2	FC Dallas	Kansas City, Kansas
7:30 PM	Croizet (yellow card) 29'; Gutiérrez (yellow card) 43'	Report	Cannon (yellow card) 35'; Badji 37'; Ferreira 57'; Acosta (yellow card) 68'	Stadium: Children's Mercy Park; Attendance: 18,736; Referee: Alan Kelly

July 26, 2019 22	New York City FC	3–1	Sporting Kansas City	New York, New York
6:30 PM	Tinnerholm 41' (Ring, Mitriță); Chanot (yellow card) 45'; Héber 54' (Ring); Ring 77' (Mackay-Steven)	Report	Espinoza (yellow card) 45'; Roger Espinoza 61; Sánchez 73' (Feilhaber, Russell); Fernandes (yellow card) 80'; Baráth (yellow card) 90+4'	Stadium: Yankee Stadium; Attendance: 20,178; Referee: Dave Gantar

August 4, 2019 23	Seattle Sounders FC	2–3	Sporting Kansas City	Seattle, Washington
9:00 PM	Tolo (yellow card) 35'; Morris 46' (Lodeiro), 82' (Bwana); Abdul-Salaam (yellow card) 55'; Lodeiro (yellow card) 71'	Report	Gutiérrez 12' (Sinovic), 33' (pen.); Sinovic (yellow card) 40'; Fernandes (yellow card) 53'; Hurtado 58' (Fernandes); Feilhaber (yellow card) 62'	Stadium: CenturyLink Field; Attendance: 37,722; Referee: Ismail Elfath

August 10, 2019 24	Sporting Kansas City	1–2	Real Salt Lake	Kansas City, Kansas
7:30 PM	Gutiérrez (yellow card) 29'; Russell 31'; Fontas (yellow card) 45+4'; Sallói (red card) 84'; Hurtado (yellow card) 90+2'	Report	Besler (yellow card) 29'; Baird 38', 70', (yellow card) 76'; Toia (yellow card) 45+2'; Herrera (yellow card) 90+5'	Stadium: Children's Mercy Park; Attendance: 18,219; Referee: Fotis Bazakos

August 14, 2019 25	Orlando City SC	1–0	Sporting Kansas City	Orlando, Florida
6:30 PM	Akindele 21', (yellow card) 49'; Nani (yellow card) 37'	Report	Gutiérrez (yellow card) 37'; Martins (yellow card) 90'	Stadium: Exploria Stadium; Attendance: 22,347; Referee: Robert Sibiga

August 17, 2019 26	Sporting Kansas City	2–1	San Jose Earthquakes	Kansas City, Kansas
7:30 PM	Feilhaber 50'; Espinoza (yellow card) 65'; Smith 76'; Russell (yellow card) 88'	Report	Wondolowski 25'; Judson (yellow card) 59'; Yueill (yellow card) 61'	Stadium: Children's Mercy Park; Attendance: 17,941; Referee: Drew Fischer

August 22, 2019 27	Sporting Kansas City	1–0	Minnesota United FC	Kansas City, Kansas
8:30 PM	Zusi (yellow card) 81'; Hurtado 88' (Russell)	Report	Dotson (yellow card) 74'	Stadium: Children's Mercy Park; Attendance: 17,083; Referee: Rubiel Vazquez

August 31, 2019 28	Sporting Kansas City	1–0	Houston Dynamo	Kansas City, Kansas
7:30 PM	Russell 12'; Gutiérrez (yellow card) 47'	Report	B. García (yellow card) 61'; DeLaGarza (yellow card) 65'; Vera (yellow card) 89'; Figueroa (yellow card) 90+3'	Stadium: Children's Mercy Park; Attendance: 18,917; Referee: Alan Kelly

September 7, 2019 29	Portland Timbers	2–1	Sporting Kansas City	Portland, Oregon
9:30 PM	Fernandes (yellow card) 45'; Zusi (yellow card) 69'; Feilhaber 65' (Sallói)	Report	Polo (yellow card) 40'; Ebobisse 83'; Ebobisse (yellow card) 86'; Fernández 90+4' (Valeri, Conechny)	Stadium: Providence Park; Attendance: 25,218; Referee: Alex Chilowicz

September 15, 2019 30	LA Galaxy	7–2	Sporting Kansas City	Carson, California
9:00 PM	Feltscher (yellow card) 14'; Ibrahimović 32'; Corona 48' (Pavón, Feltscher); Ibrahimović 51' (Feltscher, Lletget); Antuna 69'; Lletget 77' (Romney, Corona); Lletget 79' (Antuna); Ibrahimović 85' (Álvarez); Corona (yellow card) 89'	Report	Gutiérrez 24' (Fernandes) 86' (Busio); Smith (yellow card) 43'; Fernandes (yellow card) 45+3'; Sánchez (yellow card) 76'	Stadium: StubHub Center; Attendance: 22,465; Referee: Ted Unkel

September 21, 2019 31	Sporting Kansas City	2–3	Colorado Rapids	Kansas City, Kansas
7:30 PM	Gerso 3'; Besler (yellow card) 8' (yellow-red card) 20'; Smith 14' (o.g.); Martins (yellow card) 30'	Report	Nicholson (yellow card) 18'; Kamara 42'; Rosenberry (yellow card) 43'; Rubio 76' (yellow card) 83'; Smith 85'; Abubakar (yellow card) 90+4'	Stadium: Children's Mercy Park; Attendance: 18,862; Referee: Nima Saghafi

September 25, 2019 32	Minnesota United FC	2–1	Sporting Kansas City	Saint Paul, Minnesota
7:00 PM	Alonso 70'; Gasper (yellow card) 79' (yellow-red card) 90+4'; Dotson 90'	Report	Baráth 7'; Gutiérrez (yellow card) 90+3'; Németh (yellow card) 90+6'	Stadium: Allianz Field; Attendance: 19,609; Referee: Ismail Elfath

September 29, 2019 33	Sporting Kansas City	2-2	Portland Timbers	Kansas City, Kansas
6:30 PM	Németh 30'; Gutiérrez (yellow card) 35'; Espinoza (red card) 38'; Sallói 46'; Baráth (yellow card) 75'; Melia (yellow card) 81'; Sánchez (red card) 84'	Report	Blanco 29' (yellow card) 65'; Fernández (yellow card) 35' (yellow-red card) 36'; Zambrano (yellow card) 60'; Valentin (yellow card) 72'; Asprilla 85' (pen.)	Stadium: Children's Mercy Park; Attendance: 17,281; Referee: Allen Chapman

October 6, 2019 34	FC Dallas	6-0	Sporting Kansas City	Frisco, Texas
3:00 PM	Ondrášek 9', 68'; Hedges 12'; Mosquera 51'; Barrios 54'; Ferreira 73'	Report	Németh (yellow card) 57'; Baráth (yellow card) 67'; Medranda (yellow card) 86'	Stadium: Toyota Stadium; Attendance: 15,623; Referee: Alan Kelly

=== Standings ===
==== Western Conference ====
2019 MLS Western Conference standings
Pos	Team	Pld	W	L	T	GF	GA	GD	Pts
8	San Jose Earthquakes	34	13	16	5	51	52	−1	44
9	Colorado Rapids	34	12	16	6	57	60	−3	42
10	Houston Dynamo	34	12	18	4	45	57	−12	40
11	Sporting Kansas City	34	10	16	8	49	67	−18	38
12	Vancouver Whitecaps FC	34	8	16	10	37	58	−21	34

Source: MLS
Rules for classification: 1) points; 2) total wins; 3) total goal differential; 4) total goals scored; 5) disciplinary points; 6) away goal differential; 7) away goals scored; 8) home goals scored; 9) home goal differential; 10) coin toss or drawing of lots

==== Overall table ====
2019 MLS regular season standings
Pos	Team	Pld	W	L	T	GF	GA	GD	Pts
19	Houston Dynamo	34	12	18	4	49	59	−10	40
20	Columbus Crew SC	34	10	16	8	39	47	−8	38
21	Sporting Kansas City	34	10	16	8	49	67	−18	38
22	Orlando City SC	34	9	15	10	44	52	−8	37
23	Vancouver Whitecaps FC	34	8	16	10	37	59	−22	34

Source: MLS
Rules for classification: 1) points; 2) total wins; 3) total goal differential; 4) total goals scored; 5) disciplinary points; 6) away goals scored; 7) away goal differential; 8) coin toss or drawing of lots

=== Results by round ===
Round	1	2	3	4	5	6	7	8	9	10	11	12	13	14	15	16	17	18	19	20	21	22	23	24	25	26	27	28	29	30	31	32	33	34
Stadium	A	H	A	H	A	H	A	H	H	A	H	H	H	A	A	A	A	H	H	A	H	A	A	H	A	H	H	H	A	A	H	A	H	A
Result	L	W	D	W	D	D	L	D	L	L	D	W	L	D	D	W	L	L	W	W	L	L	W	L	L	W	W	W	L	L	L	L	D	L

A = Away; H = Home; W = Win; D = Draw; L = Loss

== Player statistics ==
=== Squad appearances and goals ===
Last updated on 16 September 2019.

No.	Pos	Nat	Player	Total		Major League Soccer		Champions League		U.S. Open Cup		Playoffs	
No.	Pos	Nat	Player	Apps	Goals	Apps	Goals	Apps	Goals	Apps	Goals	Apps	Goals
Goalkeepers
29	GK	(United States) USA	Tim Melia	30	0	27	0	3	0	0	0	0	0
1	GK	(United States) USA	Adrian Zendejas	3	0	1	0	1	0	1	0	0	0
18	GK	(United States) USA	Eric Dick	0	0	0	0	0	0	0	0	0	0
Defenders
8	DF	(United States) USA	Graham Zusi	29	0	24+1	0	3	0	1	0	0	0
5	DF	(United States) USA	Matt Besler	28	0	23+1	0	4	0	0	0	0	0
15	DF	(United States) USA	Seth Sinovic	25	0	20+1	0	3	0	0+1	0	0	0
2	DF	(Hungary) HUN	Botond Baráth	18	0	15+1	0	2	0	0	0	0	0
16	DF	(United States) USA	Graham Smith	13	1	11+1	1	0	0	1	0	0	0
4	DF	(Spain) ESP	Andreu Fontas	14	0	9+2	0	2	0	1	0	0	0
14	DF	(Liechtenstein) LIE	Nicolas Hasler	8	0	6+2	0	0	0	0	0	0	0
36	DF	(Portugal) POR	Luís Martins	7	0	6+1	0	0	0	0	0	0	0
22	DF	(Costa Rica) CRC	Rodney Wallace	3	0	1	0	1+1	0	0	0	0	0
26	DF	(United States) USA	Jaylin Lindsey	1	0	0	0	1	0	0	0	0	0
Midfielders
21	MF	(Chile) CHI	Felipe Gutiérrez	32	12	27+1	12	3	0	1	0	0	0
6	MF	(Spain) ESP	Ilie Sánchez	34	4	23+6	2	4	2	1	0	0	0
10	MF	(France) FRA	Yohan Croizet	22	3	12+7	3	1+1	0	1	0	0	0
30	MF	(United States) USA	Benny Feilhaber	18	2	14+3	2	0	0	1	0	0	0
17	MF	(Honduras) HON	Roger Espinoza	18	1	13+1	0	4	1	0	0	0	0
24	MF	(United States) USA	Gedion Zelalem	7	0	3+4	0	0	0	0	0	0	0
94	MF	(Colombia) COL	Jimmy Medranda	10	0	2+7	0	0	0	1	0	0	0
85	MF	(United States) USA	Felipe Hernandez (soccer)	1	0	0+1	0	0	0	0	0	0	0
28	MF	(United States) USA	Cameron Duke	0	0	0	0	0	0	0	0	0	0
75	MF	(United States) USA	Wan Kuzain Wan Kamal	0	0	0	0	0	0	0	0	0	0
Forwards
7	FW	(Scotland) SCO	Johnny Russell	29	9	21+4	9	3+1	0	0	0	0	0
9	FW	(Hungary) HUN	Krisztián Németh	22	11	14+5	7	3	4	0	0	0	0
12	FW	(Guinea-Bissau) GNB	Gerso Fernandes	26	4	18+3	1	2+2	2	1	1	0	0
20	FW	(Hungary) HUN	Dániel Sallói	28	0	14+9	0	2+2	0	1	0	0	0
13	FW	(United States) USA	Gianluca Busio	20	3	7+11	3	0+1	0	0+1	0	0	0
19	FW	(United States) USA	Erik Hurtado	13	2	8+2	2	1+2	0	0	0	0	0
23	FW	(United States) USA	Tyler Freeman	0	0	0	0	0	0	0	0	0	0
Players who have made an appearance or had a squad number this season but have left the club
11	MF	(United States) USA	Kelyn Rowe	18	0	7+7	0	1+2	0	0+1	0	0	0
3	DF	(Rwanda) RWA	Abdul Rwatubyaye	2	0	1+1	0	0	0	0	0	0	0

0+1 means player did came on as a sub once. 1+1 means player started once and came on as a sub once.

=== Top scorers ===
Number	Position	Name	MLS	CCL	Open Cup	Playoffs	Total
21	MF	(Chile) Felipe Gutiérrez	12	0	0	0	12
7	FW	(Scotland) Johnny Russell	9	0	0	0	9
9	FW	(Hungary) Krisztián Németh	8	4	0	0	12
6	MF	(Spain) Ilie Sánchez	2	2	0	0	4
12	FW	(Guinea-Bissau) Gerso Fernandes	2	2	1	0	4
11	MF	(France) Yohan Croizet	3	0	0	0	3
13	MF	(United States) Gianluca Busio	3	0	0	0	3
19	FW	(United States) Erik Hurtado	2	0	0	0	2
30	MF	(United States) Benny Feilhaber	2	0	0	0	2
16	DF	(United States) Graham Smith	1	0	0	0	1
17	MF	(Honduras) Roger Espinoza	0	1	0	0	1
20	FW	(Hungary) Dániel Sallói	1	0	0	0	1
23	FW	(United States) Tyler Freeman	0	0	0	0	0
11	MF	(United States) Kelyn Rowe	0	0	0	0	0
28	MF	(United States) Cameron Duke	0	0	0	0	0
75	MF	(United States) Wan Kuzain	0	0	0	0	0
94	MF	(Colombia) Jimmy Medranda	0	0	0	0	0
2	DF	(Hungary) Botond Baráth	1	0	0	0	1
3	DF	(Rwanda) Abdul Rwatubyaye	0	0	0	0	0
4	DF	(Spain) Andreu Fontas	0	0	0	0	0
5	DF	(United States) Matt Besler	0	0	0	0	0
8	DF	(United States) Graham Zusi	0	0	0	0	0
14	DF	(Liechtenstein) Nicolas Hasler	0	0	0	0	0
15	DF	(United States) Seth Sinovic	0	0	0	0	0
22	DF	(Costa Rica) Rodney Wallace	0	0	0	0	0
26	DF	(United States) Jaylin Lindsey	0	0	0	0	0
Total			38	9	0	0	47

As of October 19, 2019

=== Disciplinary record ===
Number	Position	Name	MLS			CCL			Open Cup			Playoffs			Total		
Number	Position	Name	Booked	(yellow card) (yellow-red card)	Sent off (straight red)	Booked	(yellow card) (yellow-red card)	Sent off (straight red)	Booked	(yellow card) (yellow-red card)	Sent off (straight red)	Booked	(yellow card) (yellow-red card)	Sent off (straight red)	Booked	(yellow card) (yellow-red card)	Sent off (straight red)
1	GK	(United States) Adrian Zendejas	0	0	0	0	0	0	0	0	0	0	0	0	0	0	0
18	GK	(United States) Eric Dick	0	0	0	0	0	0	0	0	0	0	0	0	0	0	0
29	GK	(United States) Tim Melia	1	0	0	0	0	0	0	0	0	0	0	0	1	0	0
2	DF	(Hungary) Botond Baráth	4	0	0	0	0	0	0	0	0	0	0	0	4	0	0
3	DF	(Rwanda) Abdul Rwatubyaye	1	0	0	0	0	0	0	0	0	0	0	0	1	0	0
4	DF	(Spain) Andreu Fontas	2	0	0	0	0	0	0	0	0	0	0	0	2	0	0
5	DF	(United States) Matt Besler	2	0	0	0	0	0	0	0	0	0	0	0	2	0	0
8	DF	(United States) Graham Zusi	5	0	0	0	0	0	0	0	0	0	0	0	5	0	0
14	DF	(Liechtenstein) Nicolas Hasler	0	0	0	0	0	0	0	0	0	0	0	0	0	0	0
15	DF	(United States) Seth Sinovic	4	0	0	1	0	0	0	0	0	0	0	0	5	0	0
16	DF	(United States) Graham Smith	1	0	0	0	0	0	0	0	0	0	0	0	1	0	0
22	DF	(Costa Rica) Rodney Wallace	0	0	0	0	0	0	0	0	0	0	0	0	0	0	0
26	DF	(United States) Jaylin Lindsey	0	0	0	0	0	0	0	0	0	0	0	0	0	0	0
36	DF	(Portugal) Luís Martins	1	0	0	0	0	0	0	0	0	0	0	0	1	0	0
6	MF	(Spain) Ilie Sánchez	7	0	0	0	0	0	0	0	0	0	0	0	7	0	0
10	MF	(France) Yohan Croizet	4	0	0	0	0	0	0	0	0	0	0	0	4	0	0
11	MF	(United States) Kelyn Rowe	2	0	0	0	0	0	0	0	0	0	0	0	2	0	0
17	MF	(Honduras) Roger Espinoza	4	1	1	0	0	0	0	0	0	0	0	0	4	1	1
21	MF	(Chile) Felipe Gutiérrez	9	0	0	1	0	0	1	0	0	0	0	0	11	0	0
24	MF	(United States) Gedion Zelalem	1	0	0	0	0	0	0	0	0	0	0	0	1	0	0
28	MF	(United States) Cameron Duke	0	0	0	0	0	0	0	0	0	0	0	0	0	0	0
30	MF	(United States) Benny Feilhaber	3	0	0	0	0	0	0	0	0	0	0	0	3	0	0
75	MF	(United States) Wan Kuzain	0	0	0	0	0	0	0	0	0	0	0	0	0	0	0
94	MF	(Colombia) Jimmy Medranda	0	0	0	0	0	0	0	0	0	0	0	0	0	0	0
7	FW	(Scotland) Johnny Russell	1	0	0	0	0	0	0	0	0	0	0	0	1	0	0
9	FW	(Hungary) Krisztián Németh	3	0	1	1	0	0	0	0	0	0	0	0	4	0	1
12	FW	(Guinea-Bissau) Gerso Fernandes	5	0	0	0	0	0	0	0	0	0	0	0	5	0	0
13	FW	(United States) Gianluca Busio	1	0	0	0	0	0	0	0	0	0	0	0	1	0	0
19	FW	(United States) Erik Hurtado	1	0	0	0	0	0	0	0	0	0	0	0	1	0	0
20	FW	(Hungary) Dániel Sallói	1	0	1	1	0	0	0	0	0	0	0	0	2	0	1
23	FW	(United States) Tyler Freeman	0	0	0	0	0	0	0	0	0	0	0	0	0	0	0
TOTALS			68	1	3	4	0	0	0	0	0	0	0	0	72	1	3

As of September 16, 2019

=== Injury record ===
N	P	Nat.	Name	Type	Status	Source	Match	Inj. Date	Ret. Date
94	MF	(Colombia)	Medranda	Cartilage in Left Knee		Sportingkc.com	vs Minnesota	20 May 2018	26 May 2019
13	FW	(United States)	Busio	Quad		Sportingkc.com	Unknown	3 March 2019	10 March 2019
9	FW	(Hungary)	Németh	Quad		Sportingkc.com	Unknown	3 March 2019	3 March 2019
4	DF	(Spain)	Fontas	Hip Pointer		Sportingkc.com	vs LA FC	3 March 2019	30 March 2019
20	FW	(Hungary)	Salloi	Ankle		Sportingkc.com	vs Independiente	14 March 2019	11 April 2019
19	FW	(United States)	Hurtado	Arthroscopic surgery on Right Knee		Sportingkc.com	Unknown	20 March 2019	17 July 2019
12	FW	(Guinea-Bissau)	Fernandes	Calf		Sportingkc.com	Unknown	30 March 2019	30 March 2019
26	DF	(United States)	Lindsey	Torn Meniscus in Left Knee		Sportingkc.com	Unknown	2 April 2019	4 August 2019
22	DF	(United States)	Wallace	Surgical Procedure in Right Hip		Sportingkc.com	Unknown	14 April 2019	
4	DF	(Spain)	Fontas	Calf		Sportingkc.com	unknown	20 April 2019	20 April 2019
17	MF	(Honduras)	Espinoza	Posterior Cruciate Ligament (PCL) sprain		Sportingkc.com	vs NYRB	14 April 2019	17 July 2019
24	MF	(United States)	Zelalem	Ankle		Sportingkc.com	Unknown	20 April 2019	27 April 2019
5	DF	(United States)	Besler	Hamstring Strain		Sportingkc.com	vs San Jose	20 April 2019	18 May 2019
6	MF	(Spain)	Sánchez	Calf		Sportingkc.com	Unknown	27 April 2019	18 May 2019
4	DF	(Spain)	Fontas	Calf		Sportingkc.com	unknown	5 May 2019	29 May 2019
12	FW	(Guinea-Bissau)	Fernandes	Broken Wrist		Sportingkc.com	vs New England	27 April 2019	7 June 2019
75	MF	(United States)	Kuzain	Ankle		Sportingkc.com	training	12 May 2019	1 June 2019
8	DF	(United States)	Zusi	Oblique		Sportingkc.com	Unknown	12 May 2019	29 May 2019
20	FW	(Hungary)	Salloi	Groin		Sportingkc.com	Unknown	18 May 2019	29 May 2019
5	DF	(United States)	Besler	Hamstring		Sportingkc.com	Unknown	29 May 2019	29 May 2019
9	FW	(Hungary)	Németh	Calf		Sportingkc.com	Unknown	29 May 2019	1 June 2019
2	DF	(Hungary)	Baráth	Groin		Sportingkc.com	Unknown	1 June 2019	1 June 2019
7	FW	(Scotland)	Johnny Russell	Quad		Sportingkc.com	Unknown	1 June 2019	7 June 2019
5	DF	(United States)	Besler	Hamstring		Sportingkc.com	Unknown	7 June 2019	23 June 2019
13	FW	(United States)	Busio	Head		Sportingkc.com	Unknown	23 June 2019	3 July 2019
94	MF	(Colombia)	Medranda	Hamstring		Sportingkc.com	Unknown	23 June 2019	13 July 2019
7	FW	(Scotland)	Johnny Russell	Hamstring		Sportingkc.com	Unknown	29 June 2019	6 July 2019
8	DF	(United States)	Zusi	Abductor		Sportingkc.com	Unknown	29 June 2019	6 July 2019
2	DF	(Hungary)	Baráth	Chest		Sportingkc.com	Unknown	3 July 2019	6 July 2019
28	MF	(United States)	Duke	Hamstring		Sportingkc.com	Unknown	26 July 2019	
9	FW	(Hungary)	Németh	Abdomen		Sportingkc.com	Unknown	4 August 2019	
2	DF	(Hungary)	Baráth	Back		Sportingkc.com	Unknown	4 August 2019	25 August 2019
1	GK	(United States)	Zendejas	Back		Sportingkc.com	Unknown	10 August 2019	25 August 2019
12	FW	(Guinea-Bissau)	Fernandes	Broken Wrist		Sportingkc.com	vs Real Salt Lake	10 August 2019	22 August 2019

- Player is injured
- Player has recovered from injury
Last updated: 22 August 2019
Source: SportingKC.com
