= Gianluca Busio =

American soccer player (born 2002)

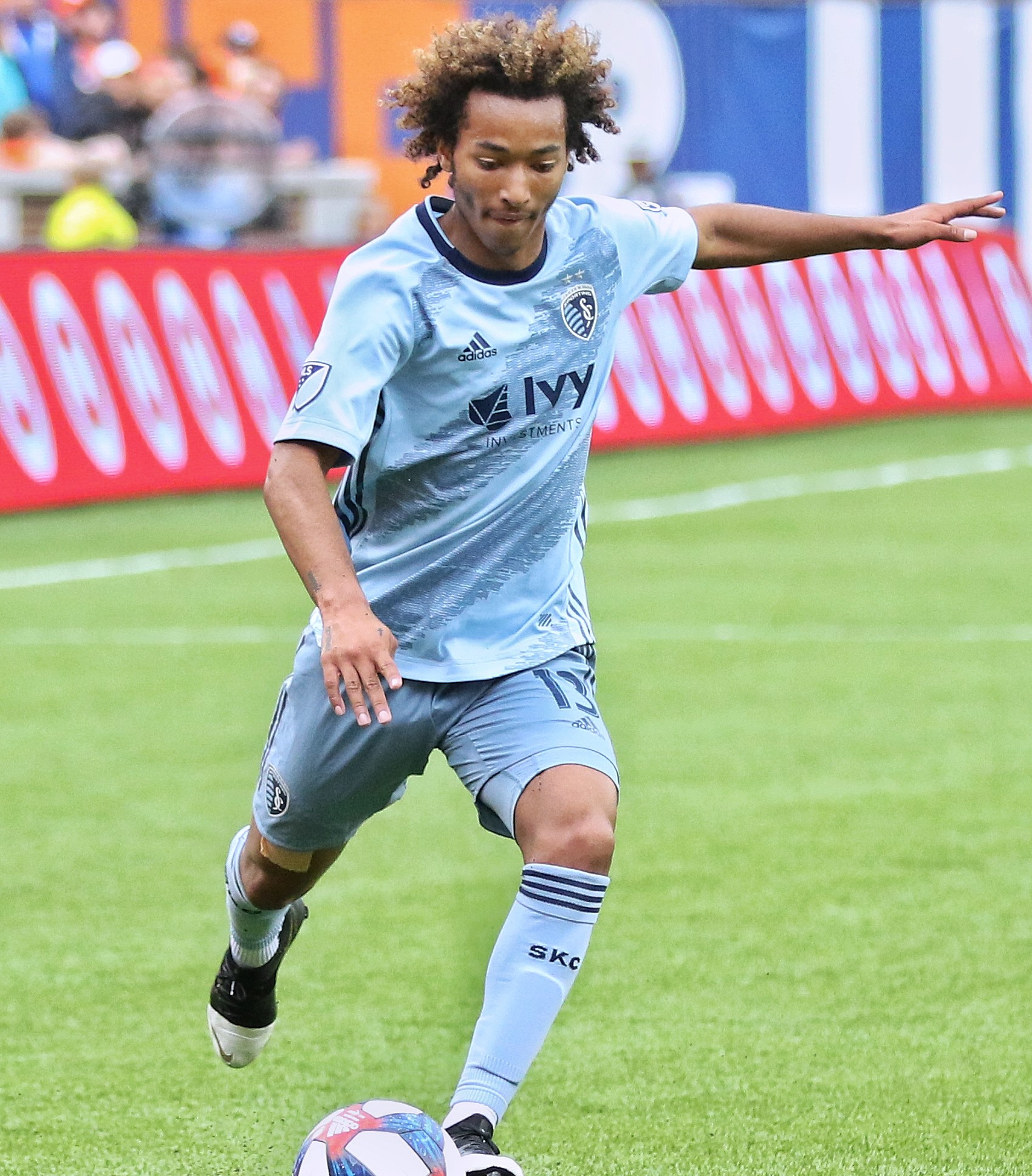
- Busio with Sporting Kansas City in 2019

Personal information
- Full name: Gianluca Cristiano Busio
- Date of birth: May 28, 2002 (age 24)
- Place of birth: Greensboro, North Carolina, United States
- Height: 5 ft 8 in (1.72 m)
- Position: Midfielder

Team information
- Current team: Venezia
- Number: 6

Youth career
- 2015: Greensboro United
- 2015–2016: North Carolina Fusion
- 2016–2017: Sporting Kansas City

Senior career*
| Years | Team | Apps | (Gls) |
| 2018–2020 | Sporting Kansas City II (Note: Sporting KC II was formerly known as Swope Park Rangers until 2020) | 16 | (1) |
| 2017–2021 | Sporting Kansas City | 65 | (8) |
| 2021– | Venezia | 164 | (17) |

International career^{‡}
| 2016–2017 | United States U15 | 8 | (3) |
| 2017–2019 | United States U17 | 15 | (6) |
| 2020 | United States U20 | 2 | (0) |
| 2023–2024 | United States U23 | 8 | (2) |
| 2021– | United States | 17 | (1) |
Medal record
Representing United States
| Winner | CONCACAF Gold Cup | 2021 |
- * Club domestic league appearances and goals as of May 8, 2026 ‡ National team caps and goals as of December 14, 2024

Gianluca Cristiano Busio (/dʒɑːnˈluːkə ˈbuːzioʊ/ jahn-LOO-kə BOO-zee-oh; born May 28, 2002) is an American professional soccer player who plays as a midfielder for Serie A club Venezia, which he captains, and the United States national team.

== Club career ==
=== Sporting Kansas City ===
Born in Greensboro, North Carolina, Busio joined the Sporting Kansas City academy in 2016 from North Carolina Fusion.

On August 25, 2017, Busio signed a Homegrown Player contract with Sporting Kansas City, making him the youngest player to sign with a Major League Soccer club since Freddy Adu joined D.C. United in 2004.

He made his professional debut on April 4, 2018, appearing for Sporting Kansas City's United Soccer League affiliate side, Swope Park Rangers, starting in a 1–0 win over Colorado Springs Switchbacks. Busio went on to make his first Major League Soccer appearance for Sporting Kansas City on July 28 as a 77th-minute substitute in a 3–2 loss against FC Dallas. One week later, on August 4, Busio made his first league start for Sporting Kansas City against the Houston Dynamo, which saw three red cards, eight yellow cards, and 28 total fouls. He provided his first career assist on a 74th-minute goal for teammate Diego Rubio, which proved to be the winner in a 1–0 match. Busio was the third-youngest player to start a match in Major League Soccer history.

=== Venezia ===
On August 9, 2021, Busio moved to Serie A side Venezia for a club-record transfer fee. The fee was reported to be $6.5 million rising to $10.5 million in potential add-ons. He made his debut for the club on August 27 in a 0–3 defeat to Udinese. He scored his first goal for the club, a last minute equalizer, in a 1–1 draw with Cagliari on October 1.

== International career ==
In October 2019, he was named to the United States squad for the 2019 FIFA U-17 World Cup in Brazil. On July 11, 2021, Busio made his senior national team debut, substituting for Jackson Yueill in the 62nd minute of the U.S.'s CONCACAF Gold Cup group match against Haiti. Busio was included in the 2023 CONCACAF Gold Cup roster, starting twice in the group stage. He scored his first senior national team goal against Trinidad and Tobago in his home state of North Carolina. Busio then started and played the entire quarter-final match up versus Canada, playing a key role in the own-goal off of Scott Kennedy.

On October 8, 2023, Busio was called up to the United States under-23 national team ahead of friendlies against Mexico and Japan.

== Personal life ==
Busio is of Italian descent through his Brescia-born father and holds Italian citizenship. His mother is African-American. He has an older sister, Ilaria, and an older brother, Matteo, who played soccer at UNC-Charlotte and whom Gianluca lists as his biggest inspiration.

== Career statistics ==
=== Club ===
As of match played May 8, 2026

Appearances and goals by club, season and competition
| Club | Season | League | | | National cup (Note: Includes U.S. Open Cup, Coppa Italia) | | Continental | | Other | | Total | |
| Club | Season | Division | Apps | Goals | Apps | Goals | Apps | Goals | Apps | Goals | Apps | Goals |
|---|---|---|---|---|---|---|---|---|---|---|---|---|
| Swope Park Rangers | 2018 | USL | 10 | 0 | — | | — | | — | | 10 | 0 |
| Swope Park Rangers | 2019 | USL | 5 | 1 | — | | — | | — | | 5 | 1 |
| Swope Park Rangers | 2020 | USL | 1 | 0 | — | | — | | — | | 1 | 0 |
| Swope Park Rangers | Total | | 16 | 1 | — | | — | | — | | 16 | 1 |
| Sporting Kansas City | 2018 | MLS | 7 | 1 | 1 | 0 | — | | — | | 8 | 1 |
| Sporting Kansas City | 2019 | MLS | 22 | 3 | 1 | 0 | 3 (Note: Appearances in CONCACAF Champions League) | 0 | — | | 26 | 3 |
| Sporting Kansas City | 2020 | MLS | 23 | 2 | — | | — | | — | | 23 | 2 |
| Sporting Kansas City | 2021 | MLS | 13 | 2 | — | | — | | — | | 13 | 2 |
| Sporting Kansas City | Total | | 65 | 8 | 2 | 0 | 3 | 0 | — | | 70 | 8 |
| Venezia | 2021–22 | Serie A | 29 | 1 | 0 | 0 | — | | — | | 29 | 1 |
| Venezia | 2022–23 | Serie B | 28 | 0 | 0 | 0 | — | | 0 (Note: Appearances in Serie B promotion play-offs) | 0 | 28 | 0 |
| Venezia | 2023–24 | Serie B | 37 | 7 | 1 | 0 | — | | 4 | 0 | 42 | 7 |
| Venezia | 2024–25 | Serie A | 33 | 2 | 0 | 0 | — | | — | | 33 | 2 |
| Venezia | 2025–26 | Serie B | 37 | 7 | 1 | 0 | — | | — | | 38 | 7 |
| Venezia | Total | | 164 | 17 | 2 | 0 | — | | 4 | 0 | 170 | 17 |
| Career total | | | 245 | 26 | 4 | 0 | 3 | 0 | 4 | 0 | 256 | 26 |

=== International ===
As of match played November 18, 2024

Appearances and goals by national team and year
| National team | Year | Apps | Goals |
|---|---|---|---|
| United States | 2021 | 8 | 0 |
| United States | 2022 | 1 | 0 |
| United States | 2023 | 4 | 1 |
| United States | 2024 | 4 | 0 |
| Total | | 17 | 1 |

Scores and results list the United States' goal tally first, score column indicates score after each Busio's goal.

List of international goals scored by Gianluca Busio
| No. | Date | Venue | Cap | Opponent | Score | Result | Competition |
|---|---|---|---|---|---|---|---|
| 1 | July 2, 2023 | Bank of America Stadium, Charlotte, United States | 11 | Trinidad and Tobago | 5–0 | 6–0 | 2023 CONCACAF Gold Cup |

== Honors ==
Venezia

- Serie B: 2025–26

United States

- CONCACAF Gold Cup: 2021

Individual

- CONCACAF U-17 Championship Best XI: 2019
