= Felipe Hernández (soccer) =

American professional soccer player (born 1998)

Personal information
- Date of birth: June 8, 1998 (age 28)
- Place of birth: Ibagué, Colombia
- Height: 1.73 m (5 ft 8 in)
- Position: Central midfielder

Youth career
- 2014–2016: Sporting Kansas City

Senior career*
Years	Team	Apps	(Gls)
2016–2024	Sporting Kansas City II	87	(13)
2019–2024	Sporting Kansas City	68	(4)
2025	Des Moines Menace	0	(0)

International career
2017	United States U19		
- * Club domestic league appearances and goals as of May 28, 2023

Felipe Hernández (born June 8, 1998) is a professional soccer player who plays as a midfielder. Born in Colombia, he represented the United States national under-19 team.

== Career ==
Born in Colombia, Hernández was raised in Nashville, Tennessee, and began his youth career with the Sporting Nashville Heroes academy affiliate. A former United States youth international, he moved into Sporting Kansas City's residential academy in 2014.

Hernández signed with Sporting Kansas City's USL Championship affiliate, Swope Park Rangers, on March 10, 2016. Over three seasons with Swope Park Rangers, he scored 13 goals and recorded a club-record 10 assists in 79 appearances.

On August 30, 2019, Hernández signed with Sporting Kansas City as a Homegrown Player.

On October 8, 2021, Major League Soccer suspended Hernández for betting on MLS matches; he missed the remainder of the 2021 season. He returned to Sporting in 2022 and appeared in every regular-season match that year.

In June 2024 Hernández was placed on administrative leave amid reports of a further violation of the league's gambling policy.

== Career statistics ==
As of match played October 7, 2020

Club	Season	League			League cup		National cup		Continental		Total	
Club	Season	Division	Apps	Goals	Apps	Goals	Apps	Goals	Apps	Goals	Apps	Goals
Sporting Kansas City II	2017	USL Championship	23	2	4	0	0	0	—	—	27	2
Sporting Kansas City II	2018	USL Championship	32	3	2	0	0	0	—	—	34	3
Sporting Kansas City II	2019	USL Championship	30	8	—	—	—	—	—	—	30	8
Sporting Kansas City II	2020	USL Championship	1	0	0	0	0	0	—	—	1	0
Sporting Kansas City II	2021	USL Championship	2	0	—	—	—	—	—	—	2	0
Sporting Kansas City II	Total		88	13	6	0	0	0	0	0	94	13
Sporting Kansas City	2019	Major League Soccer	2	0	—	—	—	—	—	—	2	0
Sporting Kansas City	2020	Major League Soccer	15	0	—	—	—	—	—	—	15	0
Sporting Kansas City	2021	Major League Soccer	4	1	—	—	—	—	—	—	4	1
Sporting Kansas City	Total		21	1	0	0	0	0	0	0	21	0
Career total			99	13	6	0	0	0	0	0	115	14

== Honors ==
Swope Park Rangers

- United Soccer League Cup: Runner-up 2017
- U.S. Open Cup: 2017
