= Gedion Zelalem =

Professional soccer player

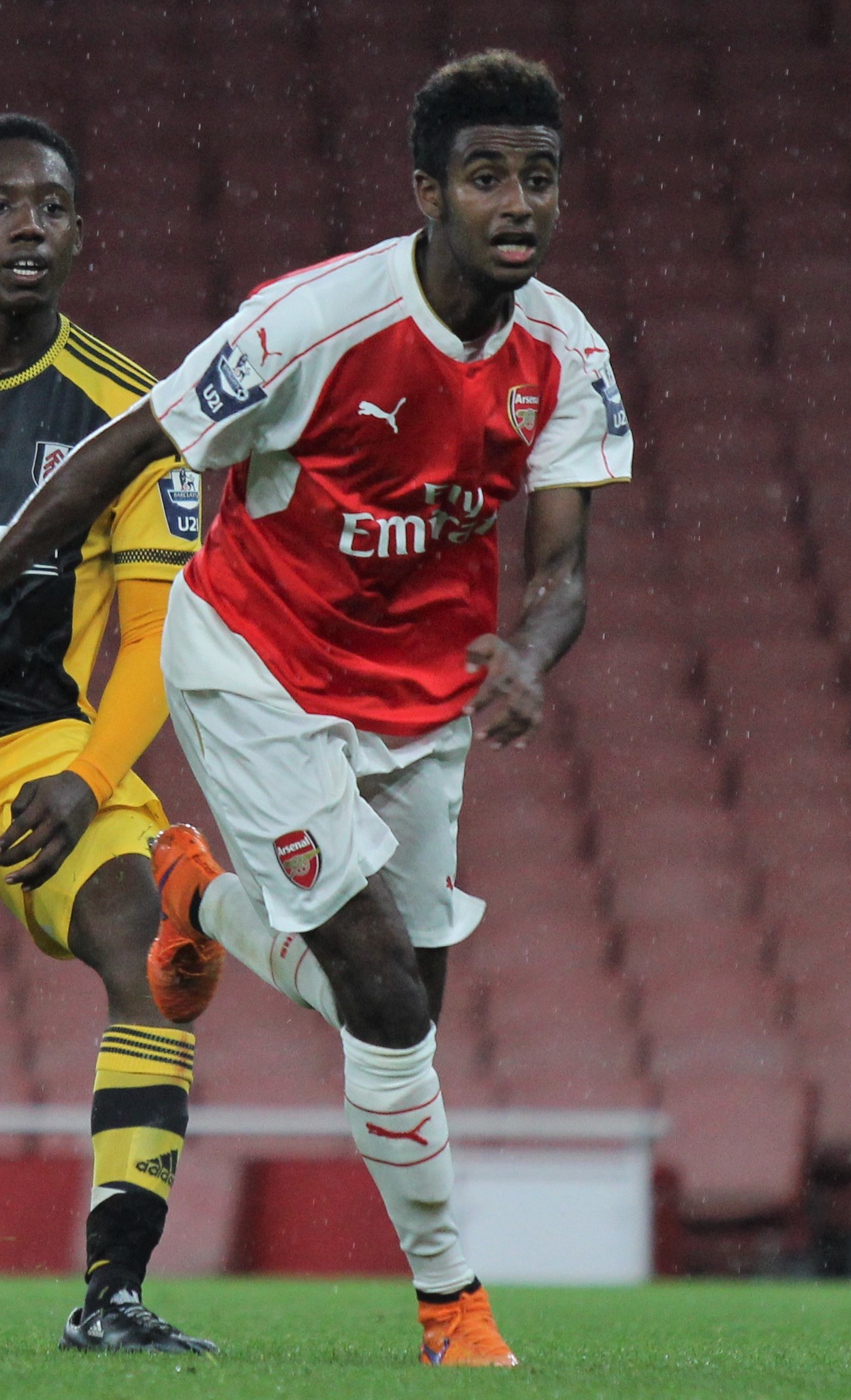
- Zelalem with Arsenal U21 in 2015

Personal information
- Full name: Gedion Zelalem
- Date of birth: January 26, 1997 (age 29)
- Place of birth: Berlin, Germany
- Height: 1.80 m (5 ft 11 in)
- Position: Midfielder

Team information
- Current team: New Mexico United
- Number: 6

Youth career
- 2002–2003: BFC Germania 1888
- 2003–2006: Hertha BSC
- 2006–2008: MSC United
- 2009–2011: Bethesda SC
- 2011–2013: Olney Rangers
- 2013–2014: Arsenal

Senior career*
Years	Team	Apps	(Gls)
2014–2019	Arsenal	0	(0)
2015–2016	→ Rangers (loan)	21	(0)
2017	→ VVV-Venlo (loan)	9	(1)
2019	Sporting Kansas City	9	(0)
2019	→ Swope Park Rangers	7	(1)
2020–2022	New York City FC	19	(0)
2023–2024	Den Bosch	38	(0)
2024–2025	Lokomotiva	0	(0)
2025–	New Mexico United	38	(0)

International career^{‡}
2012	Germany U15	2	(0)
2012–2013	Germany U16	8	(0)
2013	Germany U17	1	(0)
2015–2017	United States U20	10	(0)
2015	United States U23	5	(0)
- * Club domestic league appearances and goals as of 09:59, 10 November 2026 (UTC) ‡ National team caps and goals as of June 4, 2017

Gedion Zelalem (born January 26, 1997) is a professional soccer player who plays as a midfielder for USL Championship club New Mexico United. Born in Germany, he has represented the United States at youth level.

After playing for various youth teams in Germany and the United States, Zelalem initially played with Arsenal's youth squads after joining the team in early 2013, and made his senior squad debut for Arsenal in an FA Cup match in January 2014.

Internationally, Zelalem made appearances for Germany's under-15 team, under-16 team and under-17 team during 2012 and 2013. He became a U.S. citizen on December 2, 2014, and FIFA subsequently approved his eligibility to play for the United States on May 13, 2015.

== Early life ==
Zelalem was born in Berlin, Germany, to Ethiopian parents. He started playing football at the age of five for German club BFC Germania 1888. After this, he changed to Bundesliga side Hertha BSC's academy.

Zelalem emigrated to the United States with his father in 2006, following his mother's death in the previous year, and settled in the Washington, D.C. suburbs He played with several teams: first with MSC United, Bethesda Soccer Club and BNC Revolution, before joining the elite club team Olney Rangers and the varsity team at Walter Johnson High School in Montgomery County, Maryland.

== Club career ==
=== Arsenal ===
Arsenal scout Danny Karbassiyoon discovered Zelalem in the United States playing for Olney Rangers during a Dallas Cup match. After contacting his coaches, Zelalem was flown to London for summer training with the Arsenal youth academy; following the end of this camp, he was offered a permanent place in the academy. Zelalem started out playing in Arsenal's under-16s squad, before graduating into the under-21s in April 2013. His début for the under-21 side came against Liverpool U21 that month, but was unable to prevent Arsenal slipping to a 3–2 defeat at Anfield; however, he drew praise for his performance. He made his second appearance for the side less than a week later in a 3–2 victory over Wolverhampton Wanderers U21, once again drawing praise for his performance.

In July 2013, Zelalem was included in Arsenal's 24-man squad for their Asia tour. Although regarded as a surprise inclusion, strong performances against an Indonesia Dream Team, the Vietnam national team and Japanese side Nagoya Grampus led to him being touted as a future star, and being compared favorably to Cesc Fàbregas.

Following these strong performances, Zelalem stated that he hoped to make a few appearances during the 2013–14 season. He remained in the team for the Emirates Cup match against Galatasaray on August 4, but was unable to keep Arsenal from sliding to a 2–1 defeat. Zelalem was selected on the bench in Arsenal's second Premier League game of the season, a 3–1 victory over Fulham on August 24, but did not make an appearance. However, on September 10 Zelalem announced on Twitter that he had sustained an injury that would keep him out of action for up to two months. Although he announced his return to training in late October, Arsène Wenger confirmed that he would not be fit enough for the League Cup match against Chelsea on October 29, dismissing a previous rumor. He returned to action for Arsenal's youth side a week later in a UEFA Youth League fixture against Borussia Dortmund on November 6, playing the entire match in a 2–2 draw.

On January 24, 2014, Zelalem made his debut with Arsenal's senior squad, coming on as a substitute for Alex Oxlade-Chamberlain in the 71st minute of their 4–0 home FA Cup victory against Coventry City. And later that year, on March 18, 2014, Zelalem signed a contract extension with Arsenal to last until 2017. Zelalem soon made his second appearance for Arsenal, coming on as a substitute at the beginning of the second half, in a 4–1 away win against Galatasaray in UEFA Champions League on December 9, 2014.

==== Rangers (loan) ====
On August 24, 2015, Zelalem was loaned to Rangers until January. He made his debut in a 5–0 win over Airdrieonians in the Scottish League Cup, setting up goals for Martyn Waghorn and James Tavernier. He made his league debut in Rangers' Scottish Championship game against Queen of the South which Rangers won 5–1. In January 2016 his loan was extended through to the end of the season.

He played in 21 Championship matches, helping Rangers clinch the second-tier title, and was an unused substitute as they beat Peterhead 4–0 to win the 2015–16 Scottish Challenge Cup. A week later, Rangers played old firm rivals Celtic in the Scottish Cup semifinal. Zelalem converted a penalty in the shootout to help his club progress to the final, and started in that match, which Rangers lost 3–2 to Hibernian.

==== VVV-Venlo (loan) ====
On January 24, 2017, Zelalem signed a contract extension with Arsenal and accepted a loan move to Dutch second-tier club VVV-Venlo, lasting until the end of the season. He made nine league appearances as VVV Venlo won the 2016–17 Eerste Divisie title.

=== Sporting Kansas City ===
After no first team appearances at Arsenal upon returning in 2017, Zelalem joined Major League Soccer club Sporting Kansas City for free on March 10, 2019.

=== New York City FC ===
After Sporting Kansas City did not pick up Zelalem's option, he signed for fellow MLS side New York City FC on January 11, 2020. NYCFC declined Zelalem's contract option on December 1, 2020, but signed him to a new contract prior to the start of the 2021 season, on March 8.

Limited by injuries, Zelalem made seven league appearances in a season that culminated with winning the MLS Cup. Two days later, Zelalem signed a one-year contract extension with option years in 2023 and 2024.

Following the 2022 season, Zelalem's contract option was declined by New York City.

=== Den Bosch ===
On August 29, 2024, Zelalem's contract with Den Bosch was terminated by mutual consent.

== International eligibility and career ==
=== Ethiopia ===
Prior to making his one-time switch to the United States, Zelalem was eligible to represent Ethiopia internationally, due to his parents' nationality. Ethiopia's coach hoped Zelalem would opt to play for Ethiopia, but Zelalem turned down the opportunity.

=== Germany ===
Before becoming an American citizen, Zelalem had previously played for Germany's youth teams. He played for Germany's under-15 and under-16 sides, making two appearances for the under-15s and eight appearances for the under-16s. In November 2013, Zelalem represented Germany at under-17 level in a friendly versus Spain. But in March 2014, he withdrew from the Germany under-17 national team for the Group 5 2014 UEFA European Under-17 Football Championship elite round fixtures, and again turned down the Germany under-18 national team for friendly matches versus France in March 2015, citing his desire to represent the United States instead.

=== United States ===
Zelalem began training with the United States under-15 side in 2012, but was unable to play in matches at that time due to being classified as a permanent resident, but not yet a U.S. citizen. In May 2014, it was reported that Zelalem's father, Zelalem Wolydes, held U.S. permanent residency and intended to apply for United States citizenship. If Wolydes gained U.S. citizenship before his son turned 18, then under the Child Citizenship Act of 2000, Gedion would also acquire United States citizenship and become eligible to represent the United States internationally. He would also be able to retain his German passport which allows him to live and work in the European Union without restrictions.

The Washington Post reported that Zelalem became a U.S. citizen on December 29, 2014, and that Zelalem had applied for an expedited U.S. passport. After Zelalem received his citizenship, Sunil Gulati, head of the U.S. Soccer, revealed that the U.S. Soccer board had started the process to allow Zelalem to become eligible to play for the U.S. national team. Due to a FIFA rule designed to prevent players from naturalizing to and representing nations to which they lack ties, Zelalem was subject to waiting a minimum of five years before he could start to represent the United States. Gulati stated U.S. Soccer filed for an exception, since Zelalem attended middle school in the United States. He was approved to play for the United States and was added to the United States squad for the 2015 FIFA Under-20 World Cup on May 13, 2015. He made his debut against Australia in an under-20 friendly match on May 19, 2015, which the United States won 2–1.

== Career statistics ==
=== Club ===
As of match played March 15, 2024

Club	Season	League (Note: Includes Premier League and Scottish Championship matches)			National cup (Note: Includes FA Cup, Scottish Cup, KNVB Cup, and U.S. Open Cup matches)		League cup (Note: Includes Football League Cup, Scottish League Cup, and MLS Cup Playoffs matches)		Continental (Note: Includes UEFA and CONCACAF Champions League matches)		Other (Note: Includes FA Community Shield and Scottish Challenge Cup matches)		Total	
Club	Season	Division	Apps	Goals	Apps	Goals	Apps	Goals	Apps	Goals	Apps	Goals	Apps	Goals
Arsenal	2013–14	Premier League	0	0	1	0	0	0	0	0	0	0	1	0
Arsenal	2014–15	Premier League	0	0	0	0	0	0	1	0	0	0	1	0
Arsenal	2015–16	Premier League	0	0	0	0	0	0	0	0	0	0	0	0
Arsenal	2016–17	Premier League	0	0	0	0	2	0	0	0	0	0	2	0
Arsenal	2017–18	Premier League	0	0	0	0	0	0	0	0	0	0	0	0
Arsenal	2018–19	Premier League	0	0	0	0	0	0	0	0	0	0	0	0
Arsenal	Total		0	0	1	0	2	0	1	0	0	0	4	0
Rangers (loan)	2015–16	Scottish Championship	21	0	4	0	2	0	—		1	0	28	0
VVV-Venlo (loan)	2016–17	Eerste Divisie	9	1	0	0	0	0	—		0	0	9	1
Sporting Kansas City	2019	MLS	9	0	0	0	0	0	—		0	0	9	0
Swope Park Rangers (loan)	2019	USL Championship	7	1	0	0	0	0	—		0	0	7	1
New York City FC	2020	MLS	1	0	0	0	0	0	—		0	0	1	0
New York City FC	2021	MLS	7	0	0	0	0	0	—		0	0	7	0
New York City FC	2022	MLS	10	0	0	0	0	0	3	0	0	0	13	0
New York City FC	Total		18	0	0	0	0	0	3	0	0	0	21	0
Den Bosch	2022–23	Eerste Divisie	12	0	0	0	0	0	—		0	0	12	0
Den Bosch	2023–24	Eerste Divisie	19	0	0	0	0	0	—		0	0	19	0
Den Bosch	Total		31	0	0	0	0	0	—		0	0	31	0
Career Total			95	2	5	0	4	0	4	0	1	0	109	2

== Honors ==
Rangers

- Scottish Championship: 2015–16
- Scottish Challenge Cup: 2015–16

VVV-Venlo

- Eerste Divisie: 2016–17

New York City FC

- MLS Cup: 2021
