= William Opoku Mensah =

Ghanaian footballer (born 1996)

Personal information
- Date of birth: 3 January 1996 (age 30)
- Place of birth: Sekondi-Takoradi, Ghana
- Height: 1.78 m (5 ft 10 in)
- Position: Forward

Team information
- Current team: Mukura Victory

Youth career
- Sekondi Eleven Wise

Senior career*
Years	Team	Apps	(Gls)
2015–2019	Karela United	72	(47)
2019	Swope Park Rangers	10	(2)
2020	Asante Kotoko	10	(5)
2020–2021	Liberty Professionals	4	(2)
2021–	Mukura Victory	9	(5)

International career
2019	Ghana B	5	(2)
- * Club domestic league appearances and goals as of 19:39, 11 March 2020 (UTC)

William Opoku Mensah (born 3 January 1996) is a Ghanaian professional footballer who plays as a forward for Mukura Victory.

== Club career ==
Opoku Mensah played for Sekondi Eleven Wise at youth level, prior to beginning his senior career with Karela United in 2015. He featured in the club's promotion-winning campaign of 2017 from Division One to the Ghanaian Premier League. In 2017, Opoku Mensah had a trial with K3 League team FC Uijeongbu. He made his professional debut in the 2018 Ghanaian Premier League for Karela United against Medeama on 17 March, which preceded his first goal versus Eleven Wonders a week later. On 6 March 2019, Opoku Mensah joined USL Championship side Swope Park Rangers. He was released on 22 November 2019.

In January 2020, Opoku Mensah returned to Ghana with reigning Premier League champions Asante Kotoko. He netted on debut against Liberty Professionals on 2 February.

== International career ==
William Opoku Mensah has previously represented the Ghana B, Black Stars B team at international level.

Scored 2 goals for Ghana B in 5 friendly matches.

== Career statistics ==
As of 6 March 2019.

Appearances and goals by club, season and competition
Club	Season	League			Cup		Continental		Other		Total	
Club	Season	Division	Apps	Goals	Apps	Goals	Apps	Goals	Apps	Goals	Apps	Goals
Karela United	2018	Premier League	11	7	0	0	—		0	0	11	7
Swope Park Rangers	2019	USL Championship	0	0	—		—		0	0	0	0
Asante Kotoko	2019–20	Premier League	7	2	0	0	—		0	0	7	2
Career total			18	9	0	0	—		0	0	18	9
