= Zé Pedro (footballer, born 1992) =

Portuguese footballer

Personal information
- Full name: José Pedro Costa Amorim Cerqueira
- Date of birth: 8 July 1992 (age 34)
- Place of birth: Ponte de Lima, Portugal
- Height: 1.82 m (6 ft 0 in)
- Position: Forward

Team information
- Current team: Limianos

Youth career
- 2001–2003: Limianos
- 2003–2004: Vianense
- 2004–2006: Porto
- 2006: Boavista
- 2007–2008: Pasteleira
- 2008–2011: Braga

Senior career*
Years	Team	Apps	(Gls)
2011–2013	Tourizense	25	(4)
2013–2015	Limianos	37	(9)
2015–2016	Rio Ave	1	(0)
2016	→ Académico de Viseu (loan)	15	(4)
2016–2017	Académico de Viseu	37	(9)
2017–2018	Vilaverdense	29	(10)
2018–2019	Merelinense	31	(5)
2019–2020	São Martinho	25	(8)
2020–2021	Berço	11	(2)
2021–2024	Länk Vilaverdense	61	(14)
2024–	Limianos	0	(0)
- * Club domestic league appearances and goals as of 4 January 2024

José Pedro Costa Amorim Cerqueira (born 8 July 1992) simply known as Zé Pedro, is a Portuguese professional footballer who plays as a forward for Campeonato de Portugal club Limianos.

== Career ==
On 14 April 2011, he was an unused substitute in Europa League quarter-finals match against Dynamo Kyiv despite still being an academy scholar.

From 2011 to 2015 Zé Pedro played in the third tier of Portuguese football, representing Tourizense and Limianos. On 1 July 2015, Zé Pedro signed his first professional contract with top division club Rio Ave.

In January 2024, Zé Pedro terminated his contract with Liga Portugal 2 club Länk Vilaverdense and returned to Campeonato de Portugal side Limianos.
