= Rasambek Akhmatov =

Russian footballer (born 1996)

Rassambek Akhmatov
Personal information
- Full name: Rassambek Aslambekovich Akhmatov
- Date of birth: 31 May 1996 (age 30)
- Place of birth: Achkhoy-Martan, Russia
- Height: 1.76 m (5 ft 9 in)
- Position: Midfielder

Youth career
- 2007–2014: Haguenau

Senior career*
Years	Team	Apps	(Gls)
2014–2014	Haguenau	0	(0)
2015–2016	Obernai	32	(6)
2017	Miami City	12	(1)
2017–2018	ASP Vauban Strasbourg	28	(6)
2018	Miami City	14	(4)
2018–2019	Swope Park Rangers	30	(3)
2020–2021	Comuna Recea	22	(2)
2022	Maktaaral	12	(0)
2022–2023	Chindia Târgoviște	29	(1)
2024–2025	Gloria Buzău	30	(1)
2025	Unirea Slobozia	10	(0)
- * Club domestic league appearances and goals as of 18 May 2025

Rasambek Aslambekovich Akhmatov (Russian: Расамбек Асламбекович Ахматов; born 31 May 1996) is a French professional footballer who plays as a midfielder.

== Career ==
Rasambek arrived in France in 2003 with his family after escaping from the war in Chechnya. He acquired French nationality on 24 January 2008, through the collective effect of his parents' naturalization.

He moved to Haguenau in 2005 and discovered a passion for football aged 10 at the city stadium in small district in Haguenau before signing his first contract at 11 years of age at FR Haguenau. He would subsequently play in several Alsacian clubs before joining FCSR Obernai with the senior team. Then with determination, he tried his luck during scouting, which was organized in Paris by an American team, and out of the 800 players, he was one of the 10 selected to spend 2 weeks of testing in Miami. He finally joined the FC Miami City team, which at the time played in the American third division. After two seasons in Miami, he was noticed by Swope Park Rangers (second division), where he signed a first professional contract in the summer of 2018.

After two full seasons in Kansas City, he returned to France. During the pandemic, he spent several months without a club before signing for Comuna Recea in the Romanian second division.

Following a short stint with Kazakh side Maktaaral, he returned to Romania to join Liga I club Chindia Târgoviște.
