= Jahon Rad =

American soccer player

Personal information
- Full name: Jahon Rad
- Date of birth: June 13, 2001 (age 25)
- Place of birth: Chapel Hill, North Carolina, United States
- Height: 1.85 m (6 ft 1 in)
- Positions: Defensive midfielder; center back

Team information
- Current team: Sporting Kansas City II
- Number: 84

Youth career
- –2016: North Carolina FC Youth
- 2016–2020: Sporting Kansas City

Senior career*
Years	Team	Apps	(Gls)
2018–2023	Sporting Kansas City II (Note: Formerly known as Swope Park Rangers until the 2020 season.)	62	(0)
- * Club domestic league appearances and goals as of June 10, 2023

Jahon Rad (Persian: جیحون راد; born June 13, 2001) is an American professional soccer player.

== Career ==
Joining the Sporting Kansas City Academy in 2016 alongside his brother Kaveh Rad, Jahon played with USL Championship side Swope Park Rangers during their 2018 season from Sporting Kansas City's academy. He made his first professional appearance on July 10, 2018, as a 55th-minute substitute during a 1–3 loss to Sacramento Republic.

Rad again joined the SKC reserve team (Sporting Kansas City II) on July 2, 2020, signing another Academy contract. He made his 2020 debut with the club in a 1–0 win against the Indy Eleven on August 1, 2020.

In September 2022, Jahon Rad was named Sporting Kansas City II player of the year after the inaugural MLS Next Pro season.

== Personal ==
Rad's twin brother, Kaveh, also plays soccer for Sporting Kansas City, and his brother Cyrus Rad is also a professional soccer player.

== Career statistics ==
As of July 3, 2019

Club	Division	Season	League		Cup		Other		Total	
Club	Division	Season	Apps	Goals	Apps	Goals	Apps	Goals	Apps	Goals
Sporting Kansas City II	USL Championship	2018	2	0	—		0	0	2	0
Sporting Kansas City II	USL Championship	2019	3	0	—		—		3	0
Career total			5	0	—		0	0	5	0

== Honors ==
Individual

- Sporting Kansas City II Most Valuable Player: 2022
