= Camilo Benítez =

Ecuadorian footballer (born 1999)

Personal information
- Date of birth: August 16, 1999 (age 27)
- Place of birth: Ibarra, Ecuador
- Height: 1.70 m (5 ft 7 in)
- Position: Midfielder

Youth career
- 2014–2018: Sporting Kansas City

Senior career*
Years	Team	Apps	(Gls)
2018–2019	Swope Park Rangers	8	(0)
- * Club domestic league appearances and goals as of 24 October 2019

Camilo Benítez (born 16 August 1999) is an Ecuadorian professional footballer who most recently played for Swope Park Rangers in the USL Championship.

== Career ==
Benítez signed with United Soccer League side Swope Park Rangers on 9 February 2018 from Sporting Kansas City's academy.

Benítez is currently a coach with the Sporting Blue Valley program that is affiliated with Sporting Kansas City.

== Personal ==
Benítez was born in Ibarra, Ecuador and moved to Charlotte, North Carolina when he was 13-years old.
