= Zé Pedro (footballer, born January 1997) =

Portuguese footballer

Personal information
- Full name: José Pedro Ferreira Costa Leite
- Date of birth: 12 January 1997 (age 29)
- Place of birth: São João da Madeira, Portugal
- Height: 1.75 m (5 ft 9 in)
- Position: Winger

Youth career
- 2005–2007: Sanjoanense
- 2007–2016: Porto
- 2012–2013: → Padroense (loan)
- 2015: → Sanjoanense (loan)

Senior career*
Years	Team	Apps	(Gls)
2015–2017	Porto	0	(0)
2015	→ Sanjoanense (loan)	0	(0)
2016–2017	→ Sanjoanense (loan)	13	(3)
2017	→ Gafanha (loan)	11	(0)
2017–2019	Feirense	0	(0)
2018	→ Felgueiras (loan)	11	(1)
2019	Covilhã	6	(0)
2019–2020	Sporting Kansas City II	13	(5)
2020–2021	Beira-Mar	18	(4)
2021–2022	Sanjoanense	20	(3)
2022–2024	Oliveirense	39	(5)
2024–2025	UTA Arad	2	(0)
- * Club domestic league appearances and goals as of 8 December 2024

José Pedro Ferreira Costa Leite (born 12 January 1997) known as Zé Pedro, is a Portuguese professional footballer who plays as a winger.

== Club career ==
On 29 July 2018, Zé Pedro made his professional debut with Feirense in a 2018–19 Taça da Liga match against Leixões.

Zé Pedro left Sporting Kansas City II on July 2, 2020, by mutual consent.
