= Killian Colombie =

French footballer (born 1995)

Personal information
- Date of birth: 2 November 1995 (age 31)
- Place of birth: Paris, France
- Height: 1.80 m (5 ft 11 in)
- Positions: Winger; forward

Team information
- Current team: Atlètic Club d'Escaldes

Youth career
- Paris Saint-Germain

College career
Years	Team	Apps	(Gls)
2015–2018	Iona Gaels	72	(15)

Senior career*
Years	Team	Apps	(Gls)
2018	AHFC Royals	13	(10)
2018	Brazos Valley Cavalry	1	(0)
2019	Swope Park Rangers	21	(3)
2020–2021	Aldershot Town	15	(0)
2021–2022	Lewes	16	(1)
2022	Fjölnir	19	(0)
2023–	Atlètic Club d'Escaldes	0	(0)
- * Club domestic league appearances and goals as of 11 September 2023

Killian Colombie (born 2 November 1995) is a French professional footballer who plays as a forward for Atlètic Club d'Escaldes in Andorra.

== Career ==
=== Youth and college ===
Colombie enrolled at Iona College in 2015 and joined the Iona Gaels men's soccer team. Once the Iona season began, Colombie started in all 18 games he appeared in. Across four seasons with Iona, Colombie played in 72 games and tallied 15 goals and six assists as a forward. The Paris, France native set career-best marks in his senior season with the Maroon & Gold, scoring seven goals and assisting on three more. His performance in his senior season garnered him recognition on the All-MAAC First Team as well as second team honors on the United Soccer Coaches NCAA Division I All-East Region Team.

Colombie finished his Iona career ranked tied for ninth all-time in shots attempted (119) and shots on goal (48). He ended his career with 15 goals, six assists and three game-winning goals. Colombie's efforts placed him among 50 student-athletes on the initial PDL College Prospect List. Additionally, Colombie was eligible for the MLS Super Draft 2019 in Chicago.

In 2018, Colombie had most recently been on trial with Hearts F.C. in Edinburgh, Scotland. He has also received invitation from the New York Red Bulls. In addition to securing a training spot with Edinburgh, Colombie has trained with the Major League Soccer programs, the New York Red Bulls and San Jose Earthquakes, during the winter.

=== Senior ===
Over the summer before the fall 2018 season, Colombie played for the Albion Hurricanes FC Royals in the Premier Developmental League Mid-South Division. He led the team and tied for the conference-best with 10 goals. His five assists were a team-best and ranked second in the league. The Royals finished the season with a third place 7–7–0 record and a goal differential of zero.

Iona College men's soccer alumnus Killian Colombie signed with the Swope Park Rangers of the United Soccer League in February 2019. The Rangers are affiliated with Sporting Kansas City of Major League Soccer.

In September 2020, he joined National League side Aldershot Town, before moving to Lewes ahead of the 2021-22 season.
