= Alexsander (footballer, born 1998) =

Brazilian footballer

Personal information
- Full name: Alexsander Jhonatta de Oliveira Andrade
- Date of birth: September 6, 1998 (age 28)
- Place of birth: Uberlândia, Brazil
- Height: 1.70 m (5 ft 7 in)
- Positions: Midfielder; left back

Team information
- Current team: Vitória

Youth career
- 2014–2015: Salvador
- 2015: Cruzeiro
- 2015–2016: Salvador
- 2016: Jacuipense
- 2016–2019: Athletico Paranaense

Senior career*
Years	Team	Apps	(Gls)
2019	Athletico Paranaense	0	(0)
2019	→ Swope Park Rangers (loan)	32	(1)
2020–	Vitória	0	(0)
- * Club domestic league appearances and goals as of 24 October 2019

Alexsander Jhonatta de Oliveira Andrade commonly known as Alexsander (born 6 September 1998) is a Brazilian professional footballer who plays for Vitória.

== Career ==
Alexsander signed with USL Championship side Swope Park Rangers on 31 January 2019 on a season-long loan from Athletico Paranaense.
