= Camden Riley =

American soccer player (born 1996)

Personal information
- Date of birth: August 20, 1996 (age 30)
- Place of birth: Dallas, Texas, United States
- Height: 6 ft 3 in (1.91 m)
- Positions: Defender; midfielder

College career
Years	Team	Apps	(Gls)
2015–2018	Pacific Tigers	66	(19)

Senior career*
Years	Team	Apps	(Gls)
2017	Burlingame Dragons	9	(0)
2018	Portland Timbers U23s	12	(1)
2019–2020	Sporting Kansas City II	37	(1)
2021	Rio Grande Valley FC	16	(0)
2022–2023	San Diego Loyal	58	(0)
2024–2025	Oakland Roots	42	(3)
- * Club domestic league appearances and goals as of October 30, 2025

Camden Riley (born August 20, 1996) is a former American soccer player who last played for Oakland Roots in the USL Championship. On November 24, 2025 the Oakland Roots announced that 2025 was his last season and he will be retiring.

== Career ==
=== College and amateur ===
Riley played four years of college soccer at the University of the Pacific between 2015 and 2018, making a total of 66 appearances, scoring 19 goals and tallying 10 assists for the Tigers. Riley finished his collegiate soccer career as the Tigers' all-time goal scoring leader, surpassing Tristan Blackmon.

While at college, Riley also appeared for USL PDL sides Burlingame Dragons and Portland Timbers U23s.

=== Professional ===
On January 11, 2019, Riley was selected 45th overall in the 2019 MLS SuperDraft by Sporting Kansas City. On February 20, 2019, Riley joined Sporting KC's USL Championship side Swope Park Rangers.

On March 4, 2021, Riley signed with Rio Grande Valley FC.

Riley joined San Diego Loyal on January 26, 2022.

On November 22, 2023, it was announced that Riley had signed with Oakland Roots ahead of their 2024 season.

== Style of play ==
Rio Grande Valley FC Toros head coach Wilmer Cabrera described Riley as "tall, athletic, very technical and with an engine to run box to box during the whole game."
