= 2019 New York Red Bulls II season =

New York Red Bulls II
2019 season
- Sporting director: Denis Hamlett
- Head coach: John Wolyniec
- Stadium: MSU Soccer Park
- USL Championship: Eastern Conf.: 6th
- USL Playoffs: Conf. Quarterfinal
- Highest home attendance: 1,522 (September 13 vs. Charlotte)
- Lowest home attendance: 467 (May 1 vs. Birmingham)
- Average home league attendance: 852
- Biggest win: 8–1 (July 13 vs. Atlanta United 2)
- Biggest defeat: 3–7 (October 19 vs. Loudoun United FC)

The 2019 season was the fifth ever season of competitive soccer played by the New York Red Bulls II, the reserve team of Major League Soccer's New York Red Bulls. The side participated in the USL Championship, the second-tier of American soccer.

== Roster ==
As of July 15, 2019

No.	Pos.	Nation	Player
30	DF	USA	Sean McSherry
35	DF	JAM	Jordan Scarlett
37	DF	GUA	Allen Yanes
39	FW	USA	Sebastian Elney
44	GK	VEN	Miguel Silva
50	MF	USA	Jared Stroud
51	MF	USA	Kyle Zajec
55	DF	USA	Preston Kilwien
63	DF	GHA	Roy Boateng
66	DF	GER	János Löbe
72	DF	VEN	Edgardo Rito
77	FW	USA	Amarildo de Souza (on loan from Red Bull Brasil)
80	MF	USA	Chris Lema
81	GK	GHA	Rashid Nuhu
91	DF	USA	Rece Buckmaster

Signed to first team contract with New York Red Bulls.
New York Red Bulls Academy player.

== Roster movement ==
=== Out ===
Date from	Position	Name	To	Details	Ref.
November 13, 2018	GK	(United States) Scott Levene	Memphis 901 FC	Option declined	
November 13, 2018	DF	(Guatemala) Allen Yanes	Free Agent	Released	
November 13, 2018	DF	(United States) Andrew Lombard	Free Agent	Released	
November 13, 2018	DF	(United States) Lucas Stauffer	Free Agent	Option declined	
November 13, 2018	DF	(United States) Niko de Vera	Portland Timbers 2	Option declined	
November 13, 2018	MF	(United States) Andrew Tinari	Tampa Bay Rowdies	Released	
November 13, 2018	MF	(United States) Jose Aguinaga	Phoenix Rising	Option declined	
November 13, 2018	MF	(United States) Steven Echevarria	Free Agent	Option declined	

=== USL Championship ===
==== Standings ====
Pos	Team	Pld	W	D	L	GF	GA	GD	Pts	Qualification
4	Louisville City FC	34	17	9	8	58	41	+17	60	Conference Quarterfinals
5	Tampa Bay Rowdies	34	16	10	8	61	33	+28	58	Conference Quarterfinals
6	New York Red Bulls II	34	17	6	11	74	51	+23	57	Conference Quarterfinals
7	North Carolina FC	34	16	8	10	57	37	+20	56	Play-In Round
8	Ottawa Fury FC	34	14	10	10	50	43	+7	52	Play-In Round

Source: USL Championship Standings
Rules for classification: 1) total wins; 2) total goal differential; 3) total goals scored; 4) points earned against top four Conference finishers; 5) disciplinary points; 6) coin toss or drawing of lots

==== Matches ====
Win Draw Loss Upcoming

On December 19, 2018, the USL announced their 2019 season schedule.
All times are in Eastern time.

March 3 1	New York Red Bulls II	3–1	Swope Park Rangers	Montclair, New Jersey
1:00 PM	Barlow 26', 62'; Epps 55'	Report	Bilyeu (yellow card) 18'; Hernandez 44'; Colombie (yellow card) 73'	Stadium: MSU Soccer Park; Attendance: 727; Referee: J.C. Griggs

March 24 2	New York Red Bulls II	1–1	Nashville SC	Montclair, New Jersey
1:00 PM	Rito (yellow card) 45+1'; White 55'; Scarlett (yellow card) 78'	USL Report; NYRB2 Report	Vermeer (yellow card) 20'; Ríos 21'; Reed (yellow card) 75'; Doyle (yellow card) 83'	Stadium: Red Bull Arena; Attendance: 812; Referee: Jon Freemon

March 29 3	New York Red Bulls II	3–2	Memphis 901 FC	Montclair, New Jersey
7:00 PM	Stroud 18'; Rito (yellow card) 38'; Barlow 45+1'; Etienne 56'; Scarlett (yellow card) 59'	Report	Najem 11', (yellow card) 45+4'; Burch 61'; Dally (yellow card) 73'; Hodge (yellow card) 90+6'	Stadium: MSU Soccer Park; Attendance: 704; Referee: Matthew Thompson

April 6 4	Birmingham Legion FC	Abandoned	New York Red Bulls II	Birmingham, Alabama
8:00 PM		Report	Barlow 8'	Stadium: BBVA Compass Field; Referee: Eric Tattersall
Note: Match abandoned in the 17th minute due to inclement weather with NY leading 1-0

April 13 5	Charlotte Independence	1–2	New York Red Bulls II	Matthews, North Carolina
6:00 PM EDT	Jackson 25'; George (yellow card) 51'; Hill (yellow card) 53'	Report	Barlow 33', 36'; McSherry (yellow card) 79'; Amarildo (yellow card) 85'	Stadium: Sportsplex at Matthews; Attendance: 1,562; Referee: Guido Gonzales, Jr.

April 17 6	New York Red Bulls II	4–0	Hartford Athletic	Montclair, New Jersey
7:00 PM	Zajec (yellow card) 17'; Stroud 53'; Barlow 64'; Etienne 71'; Lema 89'	Report	de Wit (yellow card) 41'	Stadium: MSU Soccer Park; Attendance: 721; Referee: Lorant Varga

April 20 7	New York Red Bulls II	1–3	Loudoun United FC	Montclair, New Jersey
12:00 PM	Jørgenson 4'	Report	Sinclair 14'; Lubahn 22'; Ward (yellow card) 55'; Murphy 78'	Stadium: MSU Soccer Park; Attendance: 621; Referee: Elijio Arreguin

April 28 8	New York Red Bulls II	2–1	Indy Eleven	Montclair, New Jersey
5:00 PM EDT	Scarlett (yellow card) 39'; Stroud 60' (pen.); Barlow 69'	Report	Kelly 13'; King (yellow card) 59'	Stadium: MSU Soccer Park at Pittser Field; Attendance: 542; Referee: David Barrie

May 1 9	New York Red Bulls II	5–0	Birmingham Legion FC	Montclair, New Jersey
6:00 PM CDT	Etienne 23'; Nealis 55'; Jørgenson 57', 81'; Koffi (yellow card) 65'; Barlow 90'	Report	Culbertson (yellow card) 79'	Stadium: MSU Soccer Park at Pittser Field; Attendance: 467; Referee: Thomas Snyder

May 8 10	Ottawa Fury FC	1–1	New York Red Bulls II	Ottawa, Ontario
10:30 EST (UTC–5)	Fall 6'; Oliviera (yellow card) 22'; Ward (yellow card) 39'; Barnathan (yellow card) 90+2'	Report	Koffi (yellow card) 20'; Rito (yellow card) 79'; Stroud 90+2'; Mines (yellow card) 90+3'	Stadium: TD Place Stadium; Attendance: 6,807; Referee: Yusri Rudolf

May 18 11	Tampa Bay Rowdies	2–0	New York Red Bulls II	St. Petersburg, Florida
19:30 EST (UTC−5)	Tejada 29' (Tinari), 58' (Poku); Oduro (red card) 72'; Diakité (yellow card) 90+1'	Report		Stadium: Al Lang Stadium; Attendance: 7,210; Referee: Ismir Pekmic

May 24 12	New York Red Bulls II	1–2	North Carolina FC	Montclair, New Jersey
19:00 EST (UTC−5)	Stroud (yellow card) 50', (goal) 77'; Scarlett (yellow card) 90+6'	Report	Brotherton 14'; Miller 38'; Fortune (yellow card) 41'; Ewolo (red card) 59'; Comsia (yellow card) 63'	Stadium: MSU Soccer Park at Pittser Field; Attendance: 941; Referee: Silviu Petrescu

May 31 13	New York Red Bulls II	4–0	Bethlehem Steel FC	Montclair, New Jersey
7:00 PM EDT	Zajec 26', 31'; Jørgenson 65' (pen.); Scarlett (yellow card) 69'; Cortés 76' (o.g.)	Report	Chambers (yellow card) 24'; Topey (yellow card) 84'	Stadium: MSU Soccer Park at Pittser Field; Attendance: 869; Referee: Elton García

June 7 14	Atlanta United 2	1–3	New York Red Bulls II	Kennesaw, Georgia
7:30 PM EDT	Metcalf (yellow card) 5'; Decas (yellow card) 42'; Vazquez 66'; Gallagher (yellow card) 83'; Carleton (yellow card) 84'	Report	Koffi (yellow card) 12'; Rito 44'; Elney 47'; Zajec 76'	Stadium: Fifth Third Bank Stadium; Attendance: 1,662; Referee: Alejandro Mariscal

June 16 15	New York Red Bulls II	1–0	Louisville City FC	Montclair, New Jersey
3:00 PM EDT	Louro (yellow card) 45+2'; Jørgenson 83'	Report	Matsoso (yellow card) 17'; DelPiccolo (yellow card) 18'; Craig (yellow card) 45+2'	Stadium: MSU Soccer Park; Attendance: 815; Referee: Elijio Arreguin

June 22 16	Pittsburgh Riverhounds SC	3–0	New York Red Bulls II	Pittsburgh, Pennsylvania
7:00 PM EDT	Brett 40'; Dos Santos 51'; Vancaeyezeele 58'	Report	Koffi (yellow card) 63' (yellow-red card) 65'; Zajec (yellow card) 90'	Stadium: Highmark Stadium; Attendance: 2,900; Referee: Lukasz Szpala

June 26 17	Nashville SC	Abandoned	New York Red Bulls II	Nashville, Tennessee
8:00 PM EDT	Moloto 22'; Lancaster 35'	Report	Jørgenson 6'	Stadium: First Tennessee Park; Referee: Matthew Franz
Note: Match abandoned at halftime due to inclement weather with Nashville leading 2 goals to 1.

June 29 18	Charleston Battery	1–1	New York Red Bulls II	Charleston, South Carolina
7:30 PM	Mueller (yellow card) 22'; Anunga (red card) 45'; Daley 54'; Candela (yellow card) 85'	Report	Jørgenson 80'; Kilwien (yellow card) 83'; Rito (yellow card) 90+4'	Stadium: MUSC Health Stadium; Referee: Sergii Demianchuk

July 5 19	New York Red Bulls II	1–1	Ottawa Fury FC	Montclair, New Jersey
19:00 EST (UTC–5)	Zajec 54'; Lema (yellow card) 64'; Kilwien (yellow card) 90'; Louro (yellow card) 90+2'	Report	Thiago (yellow card) 11'; Gagnon-Laparé (yellow card) 13' (yellow-red card) 24'; Haworth 20', (yellow card) 44'	Stadium: MSU Soccer Park; Attendance: 812; Referee: Elvis Osmanovic

July 10 20	Bethlehem Steel FC	3–4	New York Red Bulls II	Chester, Pennsylvania
7:00 PM EDT	Moumbagna 23'; Willis (yellow card) 43'; Real (yellow card) 45'; Fontana (yellow card) 45+2'; Rayyan 46', 58'; Turner (yellow card) 90'	Report	Barlow 15', 82'; Koffi (yellow card) 61'; Stroud 76', 88'	Stadium: Talen Energy Stadium; Attendance: 256; Referee: Eric Tattersall

July 13 21	New York Red Bulls II	8–1	Atlanta United 2	Montclair, New Jersey
5:00 PM	Lema 19', 50', 63', 85'; Stroud 21', 39'; Nealis 22'; Buckmaster (yellow card) 27'; Epps 55' (pen.)	Report	Fernando (yellow card) 48' (yellow-red card) 70'; Wyke (yellow card) 58'; Conway 65'; Barajas (yellow card) 84'	Stadium: MSU Soccer Park at Pittser Field; Attendance: 802; Referee: Jon Freemon

July 20 22	Memphis 901 FC	2–2	New York Red Bulls II	Memphis, Tennessee
7:30 PM	Allen 48', (yellow card) 81', (goal) 87'; Lindley (yellow card) 69'; Kunga (yellow card) 69'	Report	Koffi (yellow card) 7'; Scarlett 10', (yellow card) 89'; Bezecourt 44'	Stadium: AutoZone Park; Attendance: 7,226; Referee: Daniel Gutierrez

July 26 23	New York Red Bulls II	2–0	Tampa Bay Rowdies	Montclair, New Jersey
7:00 PM	Jørgenson 17', 34'; Duncan (yellow card) 27' (yellow-red card) 62'; Barlow (yellow card) 47'; Lema (yellow card) 51'; Buckmaster (yellow card) 88'; Nealis (yellow card) 90+4'	Report	Guenzatti (yellow card) 23'; Diakité (yellow card) 37'	Stadium: MSU Soccer Park at Pittser Field; Attendance: 1,089; Referee: Luis Guardia

August 2 24	New York Red Bulls II	2–0	Saint Louis FC	Montclair, New Jersey
6:00 PM	Elney 34', 89'; Stroud (yellow card) 69'; Tolkin (yellow card) 74'	Report	Kacher (yellow card) 13'; Umar (yellow card) 32', (red card) 88'; Greig (yellow card) 39'; Calvert (yellow card) 75'	Stadium: MSU Soccer Park; Attendance: 756; Referee: Greg Dopka

August 10 25	Hartford Athletic	1–5	New York Red Bulls II	Hartford, Connecticut
1:00 PM EDT	Gdula (yellow card) 20'; Dalgaard 31'; Davey (red card) 53'; Lee (red card) 53'; Dixon (yellow card) 67'	Report	Bezecourt (penalty missed) 57', 81'; Elney 64'; Nealis 75'; Stroud 82'; Löbe 90+2'	Stadium: Dillon Stadium; Attendance: 4,262; Referee: Elton García

August 14 26	New York Red Bulls II	1–2	Pittsburgh Riverhounds SC	Montclair, New Jersey
7:00 PM EDT	Barlow 20'; Koffi (yellow card) 63'; Elney (yellow card) 90+3'	Report	Greenspan 36'; Mertz (yellow card) 58'; Brett 84'	Stadium: MSU Soccer Park; Attendance: 783; Referee: Matthew Franz

August 21 17	Nashville SC	1–2	New York Red Bulls II	Nashville, Tennessee
8:00 PM EDT	Tribbett 10'; Lasso (yellow card) 60' (yellow-red card) 65'	Report	Lema (yellow card) 42'; Stroud 44'; Duncan 71'; Koffi (yellow card) 75'; Tolkin (yellow card) 85'	Stadium: First Tennessee Park; Attendance: 7,002; Referee: Jon Freemon
Note: Reschedule of match abandoned due to inclement weather on June 26.

August 24 27	Swope Park Rangers	1–5	New York Red Bulls II	Kansas City, Kansas
7:00 PM	Harris 13'; Andrade (yellow card) 15' (yellow-red card) 25'; Hernandez (yellow card) 70'	Report	McSherry 7', 40'; Rito 45'; Scarlett (yellow card) 48'; Stroud 51'; Sowe (yellow card) 73'; Duncan (yellow card) 75'	Stadium: Children's Mercy Park; Attendance: 498; Referee: Sergii Demianchuk

September 4 28	Indy Eleven	1–0	New York Red Bulls II	Indianapolis, Indiana
7:00 PM EDT	Conner (yellow card) 17'; Barrett (yellow card) 28'; Walker (yellow card) 61'; Ouimette (yellow card) 79'; Kelly 83'	Report	Tarek (yellow card) 90+2'	Stadium: Lucas Oil Stadium; Attendance: 9,124; Referee: Lorant Varga

September 13 29	New York Red Bulls II	2–0	Charlotte Independence	Montclair, New Jersey
7:00 PM EDT	Jørgenson 15'; Nealis (yellow card) 47'; Scarlett (yellow card) 59'; Stroud 83'	Report	E. Martínez (yellow card) 25'; Sabella (yellow card) 37'; Roberts (yellow card) 59'; Bocanegra (yellow card) 63'; A. Martínez (yellow card) 66'	Stadium: MSU Soccer Park; Attendance: 1,522; Referee: Lukasz Szpala

September 18 30	Saint Louis FC	2–0	New York Red Bulls II	Fenton, Missouri
7:30 PM	Blackwood 3'; Darces (yellow card) 45+1'; Fink 70' (pen.)	Report	Stroud (yellow card) 25'; Louro (yellow card) 70'; Boateng (yellow card) 70'	Stadium: Toyota Stadium; Attendance: 5,462; Referee: Elvis Osmanovic

September 21 31	Louisville City FC	5–3	New York Red Bulls II	Louisville, Kentucky
7:00 PM EDT	Jimenez (yellow card) 17', (goal) 24'; Matsoso (yellow card) 29', (goal) 31', 33'; Hoppenot 45+2'; Craig (yellow card) 54'; McCabe 59'	Report	Bezecourt 20'; Stroud 37' (pen.); Boateng (yellow card) 62'; Koffi (yellow card) 66'; Sowe 71'	Stadium: Louisville Slugger Field; Attendance: 9,946; Referee: Malik Badawi

September 27 32	New York Red Bulls II	1–1	Charleston Battery	Montclair, New Jersey
7:30 PM	Tolkin (yellow card) 45+6'; Jørgenson 51'; Sowe (yellow card) 85'	Report	Woodbine (yellow card) 40'; Anunga (yellow card) 43'; Guerra (yellow card) 45+2'; Piggott (yellow card) 74'; Paterson 90+6'	Stadium: MSU Soccer Park; Attendance: 1,493; Referee: Daniel Gutierrez

October 5 33	North Carolina FC	2–0	New York Red Bulls II	Cary, North Carolina
19:00 EDT	Ewolo (penalty missed) 7', 7'; Kristo 50'	Report	Kilwien (yellow card) 7'; Scarlett (yellow card) 87'	Stadium: Sahlen's Stadium at WakeMed Soccer Park; Attendance: 4,293; Referee: Jon Freemon

October 16 4	Birmingham Legion FC	2–1	New York Red Bulls II	Birmingham, Alabama
8:00 PM	Wright 10'; Williams (yellow card) 28'; Culbertson (red card) 42'; Kasim (yellow card) 45+2', (goal) 46'; Johnson (yellow card) 80'	Report	Koffi (yellow card) 45+5'; Fisher 68' (o.g.); Kilwien (yellow card) 87'	Stadium: BBVA Field; Attendance: 3,824; Referee: Elton García
Note: The game was abandoned in the 17th minute due to inclement weather. NYRBII were leading, 1–0, on a goal in the 8th minute from Tom Barlow. The match was replayed in full on the rescheduled date.

October 19 34	Loudoun United FC	7–3	New York Red Bulls II	Leesburg, Virginia
19:30 EST (UTC−5)	Ndour 5'; A. Bustamante 13'; Murphy 33' (pen.), 36', (yellow card) 53'; Wild 42', 72'; Amoh 46'	Report	Stroud 16'; Jørgenson 65'; Sowe 90+1'	Stadium: Loudoun United Stadium; Attendance: 3,014; Referee: Eric Tattersall

==== USL Cup Playoffs ====
October 26 Conference Quarterfinal	Indy Eleven	1–0	New York Red Bulls II	Indianapolis, Indiana
4:00 p.m. EDT	Ouimette 27'	Report		Stadium: Carroll Stadium; Attendance: 5,175; Referee: Michael Radchuk

=== U.S. Open Cup ===
Due to their ownership by a more advanced level professional club, Red Bulls II is one of 13 teams expressly forbidden from entering the Cup competition.

== Player statistics ==
=== Top scorers ===
Place	Position	Number	Name	USL	USL Cup	Total
1	FW	74	(United States) Tom Barlow	8	0	8
2	MF	50	(United States) Jared Stroud	4	0	4
3	MF	7	(Haiti) Derrick Etienne	3	0	3
3	FW	25	(Denmark) Mathias Jørgensen	3	0	3
4	MF	11	(United States) Marcus Epps	1	0	1
4	DF	15	(United States) Sean Nealis	1	0	1
4	FW	42	(United States) Brian White	1	0	1
4	MF	80	(United States) Chris Lema	1	0	1
Total				22	0	22

- Updated to matches played on May 18, 2019.

=== Disciplinary ===
No.	Pos.	Name	USL		Total		Discipline	
No.	Pos.	Name	Apps	Goals	Apps	Goals	A yellow rectangular card	A red rectangular card
35	DF	(Jamaica) Jordan Scarlett	2	0	0	0	2	0
72	DF	(Venezuela) Edgardo Rito	2	0	0	0	2	0

== See also ==
- 2019 USL Championship season
