= 2020 New York Red Bulls season =

New York Red Bulls
2020 season
- Sporting director: Denis Hamlett
- Head coach: Chris Armas (until September 4); Bradley Carnell
- Major League Soccer: Conference: 6th Overall: 13th
- MLS Cup playoffs: First round
- U.S. Open Cup: Canceled
- Leagues Cup: Canceled
- MLS is Back Tournament: Group stage
- Top goalscorer: League: Brian White (5 goals); All: Brian White (6 goals)
- Highest home attendance: 15,703 vs Cincinnati (March 1)
- Average home league attendance: 15,703
- Biggest win: MIA 1–4 RBNY (September 23); RBNY 4–1 MTL (September 27)
- Biggest defeat: RBNY 2–5 NYC (November 1)
Home colors	Away colors

The 2020 New York Red Bulls season was the club's twenty-fifth season in Major League Soccer, the top division of soccer in the United States.

== Team information ==
=== Squad information ===
As of November 21, 2020

Appearances and goals are career totals from all-competitions.

Squad No.	Name	Nationality	Position(s)	Date of birth (age)	Signed from	Games played	Goals scored
Goalkeepers
1	David Jensen	(Denmark)	GK	March 25, 1992 (aged 28)	(Netherlands) Utrecht	11	0
18	Ryan Meara	(United States)	GK	November 15, 1990 (aged 30)	(United States) Fordham University	54	0
40	Kendall McIntosh	(United States)	GK	January 24, 1994 (aged 26)	(United States) Portland Timbers	0	0
Defenders
3	Amro Tarek	(Egypt)	CB/LB	May 17, 1992 (aged 28)	(United States) Orlando City SC	33	1
6	Kyle Duncan	(United States)	RB	August 8, 1997 (aged 23)	(France) Valenciennes	44	4
7	Patrick Seagrist	(United States)	LB	February 21, 1998 (aged 22)	(United States) Marquette University	3	0
15	Sean Nealis	(United States)	CB	January 22, 1997 (aged 23)	(United States) Hofstra University	16	1
24	Jason Pendant	(France)	LB	February 9, 1997 (aged 23)	(France) Sochaux	21	0
26	Tim Parker	(United States)	CB	February 23, 1993 (aged 27)	(Canada) Vancouver Whitecaps FC	94	3
33	Aaron Long	(United States)	CB	October 12, 1992 (aged 28)	(United States) New York Red Bulls II	135	9
39	Mandela Egbo	(England)	RB	August 17, 1997 (aged 23)	(Germany) SV Darmstadt 98	9	1
47	John Tolkin	(United States)	CB	July 31, 2002 (aged 18)	Academy	0	0
Midfielders
8	Jared Stroud	(United States)	CM	July 10, 1996 (aged 24)	(United States) New York Red Bulls II	21	0
10	Kaku	(Paraguay)	CM	January 11, 1995 (aged 25)	(Argentina) Huracán	87	14
16	Dru Yearwood	(England)	CM	February 17, 2000 (aged 20)	(England) Brentford	13	0
17	Ben Mines	(United States)	CM	May 12, 2000 (aged 20)	Academy	6	2
21	Omir Fernandez	(United States)	RW/LW	February 8, 1999 (aged 21)	Academy	34	5
22	Florian Valot	(France)	CM	February 13, 1993 (aged 27)	(United States) New York Red Bulls II	47	5
23	Cristian Cásseres Jr.	(Venezuela)	CM	January 20, 2000 (aged 20)	(Venezuela) Deportivo La Guaira	48	6
27	Sean Davis	(United States)	CM	February 8, 1993 (aged 27)	Academy	173	7
37	Caden Clark	(United States)	CM	May 27, 2003 (aged 17)	(United States) New York Red Bulls II	8	3
77	Daniel Royer	(Austria)	RW/LW	May 22, 1990 (aged 30)	(Denmark) FC Midtjylland	140	50
80	Chris Lema	(United States)	CM	August 5, 1996 (aged 24)	(United States) New York Red Bulls II	0	0
90	Marc Rzatkowski	(Germany)	CM	March 2, 1990 (aged 30)	(Austria) Red Bull Salzburg	82	5
Forwards
11	Samuel Tetteh	(Ghana)	FW	July 28, 1996 (aged 24)	(Austria) Red Bull Salzburg (on loan)	10	0
25	Mathias Jørgensen	(Denmark)	FW	September 20, 2000 (aged 20)	(Denmark) Odense Boldklub	14	0
42	Brian White	(United States)	FW	February 3, 1996 (aged 24)	(United States) New York Red Bulls II	46	16
74	Tom Barlow	(United States)	FW	July 8, 1995 (aged 25)	(United States) New York Red Bulls II	36	8

== Roster transactions ==
=== In ===
#	Pos.	Player	Signed from	Details	Date	Source
40	GK	(United States) Kendall McIntosh	(United States) Portland Timbers	2019 MLS Re-Entry Draft	November 26, 2019	
80	MF	(United States) Chris Lema	(United States) New York Red Bulls II	Free transfer	January 7, 2020	
8	MF	(United States) Jared Stroud	(United States) New York Red Bulls II	Free transfer	January 7, 2020	
47	DF	(United States) John Tolkin	Academy	Homegrown Player	January 14, 2020	
20	MF	(England) Josh Sims	(England) Southampton	Loan until June 2020	January 21, 2020	
1	GK	(Denmark) David Jensen	(Netherlands) Utrecht	Undisclosed transfer	January 29, 2020	
39	DF	(England) Mandela Egbo	(Germany) SV Darmstadt 98	Undisclosed transfer	January 30, 2020	
7	DF	(United States) Patrick Seagrist	(United States) Marquette	2020 MLS SuperDraft	February 27, 2020	
24	DF	(France) Jason Pendant	(France) Sochaux	Undisclosed transfer	March 10, 2020	
16	MF	(England) Dru Yearwood	(England) Brentford	Undisclosed transfer	August 5, 2020	
11	FW	(Ghana) Samuel Tetteh	(Austria) Red Bull Salzburg	Loan until December 2020	August 11, 2020	
37	MF	(United States) Caden Clark	(United States) New York Red Bulls II	Free transfer	October 10, 2020	

=== Out ===
#	Pos.	Player	Signed by	Details	Date	Source
5	DF	(United States) Connor Lade	Retired		October 23, 2019	
31	GK	(United States) Luis Robles	(United States) Inter Miami CF	Option declined	November 21, 2019	
88	MF	(France) Vincent Bezecourt	(United States) Miami FC	Option declined	November 21, 2019	
11	MF	(United States) Marcus Epps	(United States) Portland Timbers 2	Option declined	November 21, 2019	
7	MF	(Haiti) Derrick Etienne	(United States) Columbus Crew	Option declined	November 21, 2019	
8	MF	(Ivory Coast) Jean-Christophe Koffi	(United States) Memphis 901 FC	Option declined	November 21, 2019	
24	GK	(United States) Evan Louro	(United States) Tampa Bay Rowdies	Option declined	November 21, 2019	
99	FW	(England) Bradley Wright-Phillips	(United States) Los Angeles FC	Contract expired	November 21, 2019	
20	MF	(England) Josh Sims (Note: Following the conclusion of Sims' loan he re-signed with the club on January 21, 2020.)	(England) Southampton	End of loan	November 21, 2019	
62	DF	(Panama) Michael Amir Murillo	(Belgium) Anderlecht	$755,000	December 6, 2019	
92	DF	(Jamaica) Kemar Lawrence	(Belgium) Anderlecht	$1,500,000	January 30, 2020	
91	DF	(United States) Rece Buckmaster	(United States) Memphis 901 FC	Waived	February 29, 2020	
20	MF	(England) Josh Sims	(England) Southampton	End of loan	July 1, 2020	
19	MF	(United States) Alex Muyl	(United States) Nashville SC	2020 and 2021 International Roster Spot	August 13, 2020	

Total expenditure: $0

Total revenue: $2,255,000

Net income: ▲$2,255,000

=== Draft picks ===
Round	Position	Player	College	Reference
1 (10)	DF	(United States) Patrick Seagrist	Marquette	
1 (15)	MF	(Senegal) Cherif Dieye	Louisville	
2 (36)	GK	(United States) Wallis Lapsley	UC Davis	
2 (41)	MF	(England) Deri Corfe	Wright State	
3 (62)	MF	(Greece) Stavros Zarokostas	Rhode Island	
3 (65)	MF	(United States) Barry Sharifi	Loyola	
4 (93)	MF	(United States) Niko Petridis	St. John's	

== Preseason and friendlies ==
January 24 Preseason	New York Red Bulls	1–2	Atlanta United FC	Bradenton, Florida
11:30 AM EST	Valot 7'	Report	Martínez; Barco	Stadium: IMG Academy

January 28 Preseason	South Florida Bulls	0–4	New York Red Bulls	Bradenton, Florida
7:00 PM EST		Report	Muyl; Stroud; Dieye; Mines	Stadium: IMG Academy

February 1 Preseason	New York Red Bulls	3–0	D.C. United	Bradenton, Florida
11:30 AM EST	Royer 11'; Valot 22'; Barlow 63'	Report		Stadium: IMG Academy

February 8 Preseason	New York Red Bulls	2–1	Independiente del Valle	Hanover, New Jersey
1:00 PM EST	Kaku; Jørgensen	Report	Nieto	Stadium: Red Bull Training Facility

February 12 Preseason	Phoenix Rising	2–1	New York Red Bulls	Tucson, Arizona
6:00 PM EST	Kunga 43'; Flemmings 50'	Report	Barlow	Stadium: Kino Sports Complex

February 15 Preseason	Houston Dynamo	1–1	New York Red Bulls	Tucson, Arizona
8:30 PM EST	Rodríguez 58'	Report	Kaku 12'	Stadium: Kino Sports Complex

February 19 Preseason	Columbus Crew	1–1	New York Red Bulls	Tucson, Arizona
8:30 PM EST	Etienne 1'	Report	White 68'	Stadium: Kino Sports Complex

February 22 Preseason	New York Red Bulls	2–1	Sporting Kansas City	Tucson, Arizona
3:00 PM EST	Valot 59'; Cásseres Jr. 86' (pen.)	Report	Kinda 61'	Stadium: Kino Sports Complex

== Major League Soccer season ==
=== Eastern Conference ===
Pos	Team	Pld	W	L	T	GF	GA	GD	Pts	PPG	Qualification
1	Philadelphia Union	23	14	4	5	44	20	+24	47	2.04	Qualification for the playoffs first round and CONCACAF Champions League (Note: As Supporters' Shield winners)
2	Toronto FC (Note: Canadian clubs could not qualify for the 2021 CONCACAF Champions League through the MLS regular season or playoffs.)	23	13	5	5	33	26	+7	44	1.91	Qualification for the playoffs first round and CONCACAF Champions League (Note: As 2020 Canadian Championship finalists (awarded by Canada Soccer))
3	Columbus Crew SC (C)	23	12	6	5	36	21	+15	41	1.78	Qualification for the playoffs first round and CONCACAF Champions League (Note: As MLS Cup 2020 champions)
4	Orlando City SC	23	11	4	8	40	25	+15	41	1.78	Qualification for the playoffs first round and Leagues Cup
5	New York City FC	23	12	8	3	37	25	+12	39	1.70	Qualification for the playoffs first round and Leagues Cup
6	New York Red Bulls	23	9	9	5	29	31	−2	32	1.39	Qualification for the playoffs first round
7	Nashville SC (Note: On June 10, 2020, Major League Soccer announced that Nashville SC would switch from the Western Conference to the Eastern Conference for the remainder of the 2020 season.)	23	8	7	8	24	22	+2	32	1.39	Qualification for the playoffs play-in round
8	New England Revolution	23	8	7	8	26	25	+1	32	1.39	Qualification for the playoffs play-in round
9	Montreal Impact	23	8	13	2	33	43	−10	26	1.13	Qualification for the playoffs play-in round
10	Inter Miami CF	23	7	13	3	25	35	−10	24	1.04	Qualification for the playoffs play-in round
11	Chicago Fire FC	23	5	10	8	33	39	−6	23	1.00	
12	Atlanta United FC	23	6	13	4	23	30	−7	22	0.96	Qualification for the 2021 CONCACAF Champions League (Note: As 2019 U.S. Open Cup champions)
13	D.C. United	23	5	12	6	25	41	−16	21	0.91	

Source: MLS
Rules for classification: 1) points per game; 2) total wins per match played; 3) total goal differential per match played; 4) total goals scored per match played; 5) fewest disciplinary points per match played; 6) away goal differential per away match played; 7) away goals scored per away match played; 8) home goal differential per home match played; 9) home goals scored per home match played; 10) coin toss or drawing of lots.
(C) Champions

=== Overall ===
2020 MLS overall standings
Pos	Team	Pld	W	L	T	GF	GA	GD	Pts	PPG
11	FC Dallas	22	9	6	7	28	24	+4	34	1.55
12	Los Angeles FC	22	9	8	5	47	39	+8	32	1.45
13	New York Red Bulls	23	9	9	5	29	31	−2	32	1.39
14	Nashville SC	23	8	7	8	24	22	+2	32	1.39
15	New England Revolution	23	8	7	8	26	25	+1	32	1.39

Source: MLS
Rules for classification: 1) points per game; 2) total wins per match played; 3) total goal differential per match played; 4) total goals scored per match played; 5) fewest disciplinary points per match played; 6) away goal differential per away match played; 7) away goals scored per away match played; 8) home goal differential per home match played; 9) home goals scored per home match played; 10) coin toss or drawing of lots.

=== Results summary ===
Overall								Home						Away					
Pld	W	D	L	GF	GA	GD	Pts	W	D	L	GF	GA	GD	W	D	L	GF	GA	GD
23	9	5	9	29	31	−2	32	5	1	4	13	12	+1	4	4	5	16	19	−3

=== Matches ===
March 1 Week 1	New York Red Bulls	3–2	FC Cincinnati	Harrison, New Jersey
1:00 PM EST	Duncan 16'; Kaku 27'; White (yellow card) 30'; Royer 70'; Cásseres Jr. (yellow card) 89'	Report	Cruz 46'; Locadia 83'	Stadium: Red Bull Arena; Attendance: 15,703; Referee: David Gantar

March 7 Week 2	Real Salt Lake	1–1	New York Red Bulls	Sandy, Utah
2:00 PM EST	Silva (yellow card) 54'; Martínez (yellow card) 80'; Kreilach 90+1'	Report	Cásseres Jr. 13'; Seagrist (yellow card) 35'; Duncan (yellow card) 73'	Stadium: Rio Tinto Stadium; Attendance: 18,093; Referee: Rosendo Mendoza

March 15 Week 3	Minnesota United FC	P–P	New York Red Bulls	Saint Paul, Minnesota
7:00 PM EDT				Stadium: Allianz Field
Note: Match postponed due to the COVID-19 pandemic

March 21 Week 4	Inter Miami CF	P–P	New York Red Bulls	Fort Lauderdale, Florida
8:00 PM EDT				Stadium: Inter Miami CF Stadium
Note: Match postponed due to the COVID-19 pandemic

March 28 Week 5	New York Red Bulls	P–P	Orlando City SC	Harrison, New Jersey
1:00 PM EDT				Stadium: Red Bull Arena
Note: Match postponed due to the COVID-19 pandemic

April 4 Week 6	Chicago Fire FC	P–P	New York Red Bulls	Chicago, Illinois
2:00 PM EDT				Stadium: Soldier Field
Note: Match postponed due to the COVID-19 pandemic

April 11 Week 7	Toronto FC	P–P	New York Red Bulls	Toronto, Ontario
7:30 PM EDT				Stadium: BMO Field
Note: Extension of original suspension due to the COVID-19 pandemic

April 18 Week 8	New York Red Bulls	P–P	New England Revolution	Harrison, New Jersey
1:00 PM EDT				Stadium: Red Bull Arena
Note: Extension of original suspension due to the COVID-19 pandemic

April 26 Week 9	D.C. United	P–P	New York Red Bulls	Washington, D.C.
3:00 PM EDT				Stadium: Audi Field
Note: Extension of original suspension due to the COVID-19 pandemic

May 2 Week 10	New York Red Bulls	P–P	Columbus Crew	Harrison, New Jersey
7:30 PM EDT				Stadium: Red Bull Arena
Note: Extension of original suspension due to the COVID-19 pandemic

May 6 Week 11	FC Cincinnati	P–P	New York Red Bulls	Cincinnati, Ohio
7:00 PM EDT				Stadium: Nippert Stadium
Note: Extension of original suspension due to the COVID-19 pandemic

May 10 Week 12	LA Galaxy	P–P	New York Red Bulls	Carson, California
4:00 PM EDT				Stadium: Dignity Health Sports Park
Note: Further extension of suspension due to the COVID-19 pandemic

May 16 Week 13	New York Red Bulls	P–P	Atlanta United FC	Harrison, New Jersey
1:00 PM EDT				Stadium: Red Bull Arena
Note: Further extension of suspension due to the COVID-19 pandemic

May 23 Week 14	New York Red Bulls	P–P	D.C. United	Harrison, New Jersey
7:30 PM EDT				Stadium: Red Bull Arena
Note: Further extension of suspension due to the COVID-19 pandemic

May 31 Week 15	New York City FC	P–P	New York Red Bulls	New York, New York
3:00 PM EDT				Stadium: Yankee Stadium
Note: Further extension of suspension due to the COVID-19 pandemic

June 6 Week 16	New York Red Bulls	P–P	Philadelphia Union	Harrison, New Jersey
6:00 PM EDT				Stadium: Red Bull Arena
Note: Further extension of suspension due to the COVID-19 pandemic

June 13 Week 17	Orlando City SC	P–P	New York Red Bulls	Orlando, Florida
7:30 PM EDT				Stadium: Exploria Stadium
Note: Further extension of suspension due to the COVID-19 pandemic

June 17 Week 18	Vancouver Whitecaps FC	P–P	New York Red Bulls	Vancouver, British Columbia
10:00 PM EDT				Stadium: BC Place
Note: Further extension of suspension due to the COVID-19 pandemic

June 21 Week 19	New York Red Bulls	P–P	Portland Timbers	Harrison, New Jersey
5:00 PM EDT				Stadium: Red Bull Arena
Note: Further extension of suspension due to the COVID-19 pandemic

June 27 Week 20	New York Red Bulls	P–P	Montreal Impact	Harrison, New Jersey
7:30 PM EDT				Stadium: Red Bull Arena
Note: Further extension of suspension due to the COVID-19 pandemic

July 4 Week 21	Colorado Rapids	P–P	New York Red Bulls	Commerce City, Colorado
10:00 PM EDT				Stadium: Dick's Sporting Goods Park
Note: Further extension of suspension due to the COVID-19 pandemic

July 8 Week 22	New York Red Bulls	P–P	Seattle Sounders FC	Harrison, New Jersey
8:00 PM EDT				Stadium: Red Bull Arena
Note: Further extension of suspension due to the COVID-19 pandemic

July 11 Week 23	New York Red Bulls	P–P	Houston Dynamo	Harrison, New Jersey
6:00 PM EDT				Stadium: Red Bull Arena
Note: Further extension of suspension due to the COVID-19 pandemic

July 19 Week 24	New York Red Bulls	P–P	Los Angeles FC	Harrison, New Jersey
6:00 PM EDT				Stadium: Red Bull Arena
Note: Further extension of suspension due to the COVID-19 pandemic

July 25 Week 25	New England Revolution	P–P	New York Red Bulls	Foxborough, Massachusetts
7:30 PM EDT				Stadium: Gillette Stadium
Note: Further extension of suspension due to the COVID-19 pandemic

August 1 Week 26	New York Red Bulls	P–P	FC Dallas	Harrison, New Jersey
7:30 PM EDT				Stadium: Red Bull Arena
Note: Further extension of suspension due to the COVID-19 pandemic

August 8 Week 27	Montreal Impact	P–P	New York Red Bulls	Montreal, Quebec
7:00 PM EDT				Stadium: Stade Saputo
Note: Further extension of suspension due to the COVID-19 pandemic

August 20 Week 28	New York Red Bulls	1–0	New York City FC	Harrison, New Jersey
7:00 PM EDT	Duncan 59'	Report		Stadium: Red Bull Arena; Referee: Allen Chapman

August 25 Week 29	Philadelphia Union	1–0	New York Red Bulls	Chester, Pennsylvania
7:30 PM EDT	Przybylko 31'	Report		Stadium: Subaru Park; Referee: Rubiel Vazquez

August 29 Week 30	New England Revolution	1–1	New York Red Bulls	Foxborough, Massachusetts
8:00 PM EDT	Bou 41'	Report	Fernandez 35'; Parker (red card) 90+2'	Stadium: Gillette Stadium; Referee: Jair Marrufo

September 2 Week 31	New York Red Bulls	0–1	D.C. United	Harrison, New Jersey
7:30 PM EDT	Tarek (yellow card) 88'	Report	Brillant (yellow card) 8'; Abu (yellow card) 51'; Sorga 90+8'	Stadium: Red Bull Arena; Referee: Nima Saghafi

September 6 Week 32	New York Red Bulls	0–3	Philadelphia Union	Harrison, New Jersey
7:00 PM EDT		Report	Aaronson 36'; Przybyłko 68'; Real 78'	Stadium: Red Bull Arena

September 12 Week 33	D.C. United	0–2	New York Red Bulls	Washington, D.C.
7:00 PM EDT		Report	Long 29', (yellow card) 42'; Royer 60'; Cásseres Jr. (yellow card) 65'	Stadium: Audi Field; Referee: Marcos de Oliveira

September 19 Week 34	New York Red Bulls	0–1	FC Cincinnati	Harrison, New Jersey
7:00 PM EDT	Long (yellow card) 8'; Nealis (yellow card) 22'; Cásseres Jr. (yellow card) 55'	Report	Medunjanin 85'; Stanko (yellow card) 90+2'	Stadium: Red Bull Arena; Referee: Robert Sibiga

September 23 Week 35	Inter Miami CF	1–4	New York Red Bulls	Fort Lauderdale, Florida
8:00 PM EDT	Agudelo 39'; Pírez (yellow card) 62'; Pizarro (yellow card) 64'	Report	Egbo 14' (pen.); White 49'; Mines 85'; Royer 90+1'	Stadium: Inter Miami CF Stadium; Referee: Alex Chilowicz

September 27 Week 36	New York Red Bulls	4–1	Montreal Impact	Harrison, New Jersey
7:00 PM EDT	Barlow 14', 35'; Royer 56'; Kaku 57'	Report	Bojan 4'; Binks (red card) 90'	Stadium: Red Bull Arena; Referee: Rosendo Mendoza

October 3 Week 37	Orlando City SC	3–1	New York Red Bulls	Orlando, Florida
4:30 PM EDT	Pereyra (yellow card) 15'; Dike 24'; Urso 50'; Carlos 90+5'	Report	Egbo (yellow card) 14'; Valot 54'	Stadium: Exploria Stadium; Referee: Fotis Bazakos

October 7 Week 38	New York Red Bulls	1–2	Inter Miami CF	Harrison, New Jersey
7:00 PM EDT	Fernandez 53'	Report	Pellegrini 55'; Higuaín 81'	Stadium: Red Bull Arena

October 10 Week 39	Atlanta United FC	0–1	New York Red Bulls	Atlanta, Georgia
6:00 p.m. EST		Report	Clark 47'	Stadium: Mercedes-Benz Stadium

October 14 Week 40	Toronto FC	1–1	New York Red Bulls	East Hartford, Connecticut
7:30 p.m. EST	Pozuelo 23' (pen.)	Report	Clark 77'	Stadium: Rentschler Field

October 18 Week 41	New York Red Bulls	1–1	Orlando City SC	Harrison, New Jersey
7:00 PM EDT	White 90+5'	Report	Nani 56' (pen.)	Stadium: Red Bull Arena

October 24 Week 42	Chicago Fire FC	2–2	New York Red Bulls	Chicago, Illinois
7:30 PM EDT	Beric 51'; Frankowski 72'	Report	Duncan 39'; Yearwood (yellow card) 54'; Long (yellow card) 79'; White 90+2'	Stadium: Soldier Field; Referee: Ismir Pekmic

October 28 Week 43	New York Red Bulls	1–0	New England Revolution	Harrison, New Jersey
7:00 PM EDT	Long 89'	Report		Stadium: Red Bull Arena; Referee: Alan Kelly

November 1 Week 44	New York City FC	5–2	New York Red Bulls	New York, New York
7:00 p.m. EST	Castellanos 12', 76', 84' (pen.); Mackay-Steven 42'; Ring 51'	Report	White 18'; Cásseres Jr. 38'	Stadium: Yankee Stadium; Referee: Joseph Dickerson

November 8 Week 45	New York Red Bulls	2–1	Toronto FC	Harrison, New Jersey
3:30 PM EDT	Barlow 24'; White 26'	Report	Endoh 50'	Stadium: Red Bull Arena

== MLS Cup Playoffs ==
November 21 First round	Columbus Crew	3–2	New York Red Bulls	Columbus, Ohio
3:00 p.m. EST	Santos 26' (pen.); Nagbe 46'; Zardes 68'	Report	Clark 23'; White 90'	Stadium: Mapfre Stadium

== U.S. Open Cup ==
New York Red Bulls will enter the 2020 U.S. Open Cup in the Round of 32.

Round of 32	P—P

== Leagues Cup ==
New York Red Bulls will enter the 2020 Leagues Cup in the Round of 16.

July 21/22 Round of 16	New York Red Bulls (United States)	P—P	(Mexico)	Harrison, New Jersey
				Stadium: Red Bull Arena

== MLS is Back Tournament ==
On June 10, MLS announced that a bracket format named "MLS is Back Tournament" would begin July 8 at ESPN Wide World of Sports Complex in Walt Disney World, and end with the final on August 11.

Group E results
Pos	Team	Pld	W	D	L	GF	GA	GD	Pts	Qualification
1	Columbus Crew SC	3	3	0	0	7	0	+7	9	Advanced to knockout stage
2	FC Cincinnati	3	2	0	1	3	4	−1	6	Advanced to knockout stage
3	New York Red Bulls	3	1	0	2	1	4	−3	3	
4	Atlanta United	3	0	0	3	0	3	−3	0	

Source: MLS

July 11 Group stage	Atlanta United FC	0–1	New York Red Bulls	Bay Lake, Florida
8:00 p.m. EDT	Escobar (yellow card) 42'; G. Martínez (yellow card) 45+3'	Report	Valot 4'; Parker (yellow card) 90+5'	Stadium: ESPN Wide World of Sports Complex; Attendance: 0 (behind closed doors); Referee: Allen Chapman

July 16 Group stage	Columbus Crew	2–0	New York Red Bulls	Bay Lake, Florida
10:30 p.m. EDT	Zardes 22'; Zelarayán 47'; Room (yellow card) 89'; Mokhtar (yellow card) 90+2'	Report	Tarek (yellow card) 61'; Duncan (yellow card) 90+3'	Stadium: ESPN Wide World of Sports Complex; Referee: Ramy Touchan

July 22 Group stage	FC Cincinnati	2–0	New York Red Bulls	Bay Lake, Florida
8:00 p.m. EDT	Deplagne (yellow card) 39'; Kubo 43'; Valot 57' (o.g.)	Report	Pendant (yellow card) 60'	Stadium: ESPN Wide World of Sports Complex; Referee: Marcos de Oliveira

== Competitions summary ==
As of November 21, 2020.

Competition	Record							
Competition	G	W	D	L	GF	GA	GD	Win %
MLS Regular Season	23	9	5	9	29	31	−2	39.13
MLS Cup Playoffs	1	0	0	1	2	3	−1	0.00
Total	24	9	5	10	31	34	−3	37.50

== Player statistics ==
As of November 21, 2020.

No.	Pos	Nat	Player	Total		MLS		MLS Cup	
No.	Pos	Nat	Player	Apps	Goals	Apps	Goals	Apps	Goals
Goalkeepers
1	GK	(Denmark) DEN	David Jensen	11	-15	10+1	-15	0	0
18	GK	(United States) USA	Ryan Meara	14	-18	13	-15	1	-3
40	GK	(United States) USA	Kendall McIntosh	0	0	0	0	0	0
Defenders
3	DF	(Egypt) EGY	Amro Tarek	12	0	10+2	0	0	0
6	DF	(United States) USA	Kyle Duncan	24	3	21+2	3	1	0
7	DF	(United States) USA	Patrick Seagrist	3	0	3	0	0	0
15	DF	(United States) USA	Sean Nealis	6	0	5+1	0	0	0
24	DF	(France) FRA	Jason Pendant	21	0	17+3	0	1	0
26	DF	(United States) USA	Tim Parker	20	0	18+1	0	1	0
33	DF	(United States) USA	Aaron Long	17	2	15+1	2	1	0
39	DF	(England) ENG	Mandela Egbo	9	1	6+3	1	0	0
47	DF	(United States) USA	John Tolkin	0	0	0	0	0	0
Midfielders
8	MF	(United States) USA	Jared Stroud	21	0	11+9	0	0+1	0
10	MF	(Paraguay) PAR	Kaku	17	2	13+3	2	0+1	0
16	MF	(England) ENG	Dru Yearwood	13	0	8+4	0	1	0
17	MF	(United States) USA	Ben Mines	5	1	2+3	1	0	0
21	MF	(United States) USA	Omir Fernandez	15	2	5+10	2	0	0
22	MF	(France) FRA	Florian Valot	24	2	17+6	2	1	0
23	MF	(Venezuela) VEN	Cristian Cásseres	20	2	14+5	2	0+1	0
27	MF	(United States) USA	Sean Davis	15	0	13+1	0	1	0
37	MF	(United States) USA	Caden Clark	8	3	3+4	2	1	1
77	MF	(Austria) AUT	Daniel Royer	21	4	15+5	4	1	0
80	MF	(United States) USA	Chris Lema	0	0	0	0	0	0
90	MF	(Germany) GER	Marc Rzatkowski	17	0	7+9	0	0+1	0
Forwards
11	FW	(Ghana) GHA	Samuel Tetteh	10	0	4+6	0	0	0
25	FW	(Denmark) DEN	Mathias Jørgensen	8	0	3+5	0	0	0
42	FW	(United States) USA	Brian White	19	6	10+8	5	0+1	1
74	FW	(United States) USA	Tom Barlow	22	3	12+9	3	1	0
Left Club During Season
19	MF	(United States) USA	Alex Muyl	2	0	0+2	0	0	0
20	MF	(England) ENG	Josh Sims	2	0	0+2	0	0	0

=== Top scorers ===
Place	Position	Number	Name	MLS	MLS Cup	Total
1	FW	42	(United States) Brian White	5	1	6
2	MF	77	(Austria) Daniel Royer	4	0	4
2	DF	6	(United States) Kyle Duncan	3	0	3
2	MF	37	(United States) Caden Clark	2	1	3
2	FW	74	(United States) Tom Barlow	3	0	3
3	MF	10	(Paraguay) Kaku	2	0	2
3	MF	21	(United States) Omir Fernandez	2	0	2
3	MF	22	(France) Florian Valot	2	0	2
3	MF	23	(Venezuela) Cristian Cásseres	2	0	2
3	DF	33	(United States) Aaron Long	2	0	2
4	MF	17	(United States) Ben Mines	1	0	1
4	DF	39	(England) Mandela Egbo	1	0	1
Own goals				0	0	0
Total				29	2	31

As of November 21, 2020.

=== Assist Leaders ===
Place	Position	Number	Name	MLS	MLS Cup	Total
1	MF	8	(United States) Jared Stroud	2	1	3
1	MF	10	(Paraguay) Kaku	3	0	3
2	DF	6	(United States) Kyle Duncan	2	0	2
2	MF	22	(France) Florian Valot	2	0	2
2	MF	23	(Venezuela) Cristian Cásseres Jr.	2	0	2
2	DF	24	(France) Jason Pendant	2	0	2
2	MF	77	(Austria) Daniel Royer	2	0	2
3	MF	17	(United States) Ben Mines	1	0	1
3	MF	21	(United States) Omir Fernandez	1	0	1
3	DF	26	(United States) Tim Parker	1	0	1
3	DF	39	(England) Mandela Egbo	1	0	1
3	FW	42	(United States) Brian White	1	0	1
3	MF	90	(Germany) Marc Rzatkowski	1	0	1
Total				21	1	22

As of November 21, 2020.
This table does not include secondary assists.

=== Shutouts ===
Place	Position	Number	Name	MLS	MLS Cup	Total
1	GK	18	(United States) Ryan Meara	3	0	3
2	GK	1	(Denmark) David Jensen	1	0	1
Total				4	0	4

As of November 21, 2020.

=== Disciplinary record ===
No.	Pos.	Nat.	Player	MLS		MLS Cup		Total	
No.	Pos.	Nat.	Player	Booked	Sent off (straight red)	Booked	Sent off (straight red)	Booked	Sent off (straight red)
3	DF	(Egypt)	Amro Tarek	3	0	0	0	3	0
6	DF	(United States)	Kyle Duncan	3	0	1	0	4	0
7	DF	(United States)	Patrick Seagrist	1	0	0	0	1	0
8	MF	(United States)	Jared Stroud	1	0	0	0	1	0
15	DF	(United States)	Sean Nealis	2	0	0	0	2	0
16	MF	(England)	Dru Yearwood	3	0	0	0	3	0
18	GK	(United States)	Ryan Meara	1	0	0	0	1	0
22	MF	(France)	Florian Valot	1	0	0	0	1	0
23	MF	(Venezuela)	Cristian Cásseres	3	0	0	0	3	0
24	DF	(France)	Jason Pendant	2	0	0	0	2	0
26	DF	(United States)	Tim Parker	1	1	0	0	1	1
27	MF	(United States)	Sean Davis	1	0	1	0	2	0
33	DF	(United States)	Aaron Long	4	0	1	0	5	0
39	DF	(England)	Mandela Egbo	1	0	0	0	1	0
42	FW	(United States)	Brian White	1	0	0	0	1	0
90	MF	(Germany)	Marc Rzatkowski	1	0	0	0	1	0
Totals				29	1	3	0	32	1

As of November 21, 2020.
