= Aaron Long (soccer) =

American soccer player (born 1992)

- Long with Los Angeles FC in 2026

Personal information
- Full name: Aaron Ray Long
- Date of birth: October 12, 1992 (age 34)
- Place of birth: Oak Hills, California, U.S.
- Height: 6 ft 1 in (1.85 m)
- Position: Center-back

Team information
- Current team: Los Angeles FC
- Number: 33

College career
Years	Team	Apps	(Gls)
2010–2013	UC Riverside Highlanders	71	(13)

Senior career*
Years	Team	Apps	(Gls)
2012–2013	FC Tucson	17	(3)
2014	Portland Timbers	0	(0)
2014	→ Sacramento Republic (loan)	2	(0)
2014	→ Orange County Blues (loan)	3	(0)
2014	Seattle Sounders FC	0	(0)
2015	Seattle Sounders FC 2	27	(1)
2016	New York Red Bulls II	22	(2)
2016	→ New York Red Bulls (loan)	0	(0)
2017–2022	New York Red Bulls	139	(12)
2023–	Los Angeles FC	82	(2)

International career^{‡}
2018–2023	United States	35	(3)
Medal record
Representing United States
Runner-up	CONCACAF Gold Cup	2019
- * Club domestic league appearances and goals as of November 1, 2026 ‡ National team caps and goals as of July 12, 2023

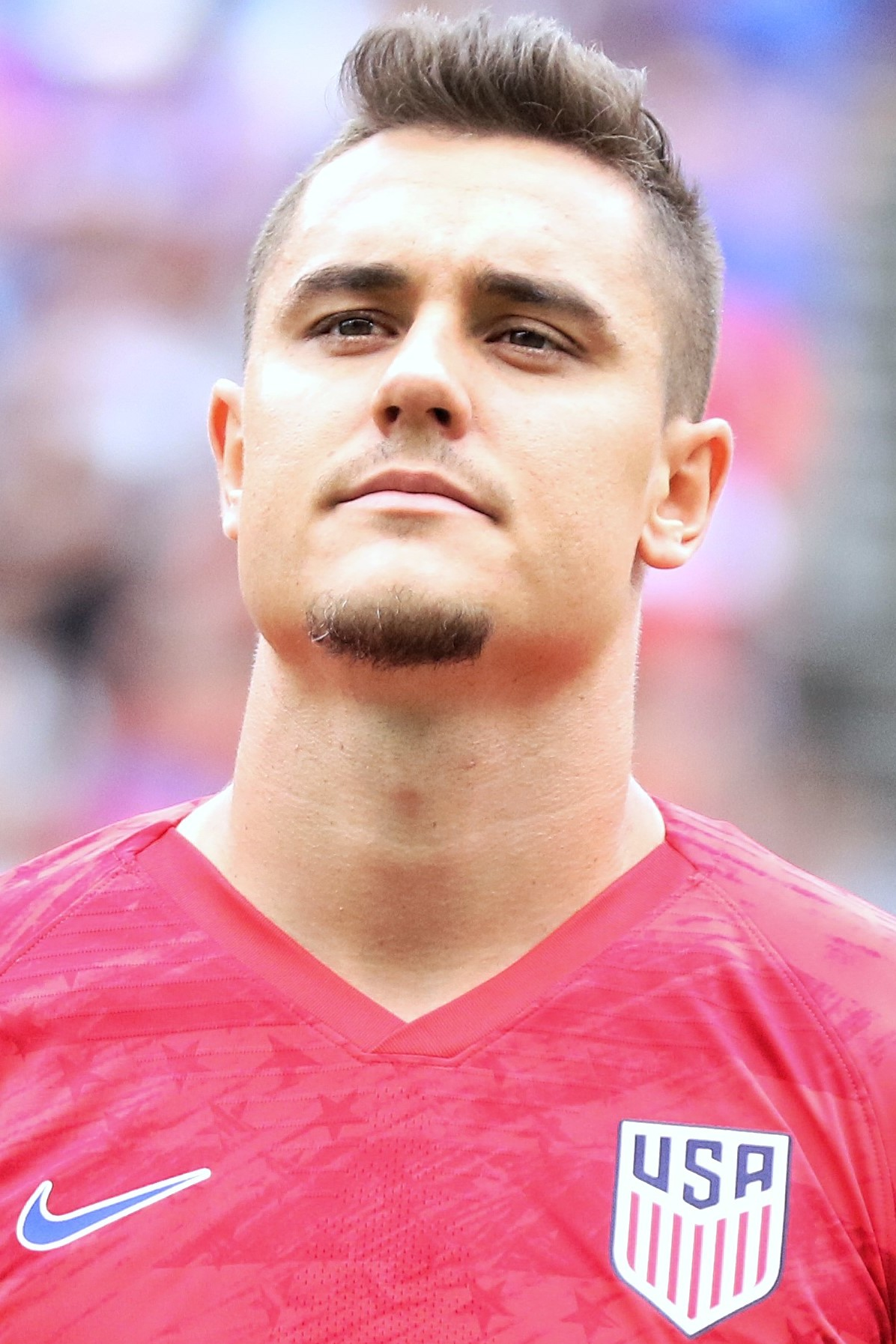
Long with the United States in 2019

Aaron Ray Long (born October 12, 1992) is an American professional soccer player who plays as a center-back for Major League Soccer club Los Angeles FC.

Born in Oak Hills, California, Long played four seasons of college soccer for the UC Riverside Highlanders before being drafted in the second round of the 2014 MLS SuperDraft by the Portland Timbers with the 36th overall pick. After loan spells with USL Pro clubs Sacramento Republic and Orange County Blues, Long was released by the Timbers and subsequently signed by rivals Seattle Sounders FC.

Long was part of the Sounders organization for two seasons. After not making an appearance for the senior team, Long signed a contract with their reserve side, Seattle Sounders 2. He spent a season with Sounders 2 before joining the New York Red Bulls II in 2016. During his one season with Red Bulls II, Long helped the side win the USL championship and was named the USL Defender of the Year. Long then established himself as a starting center-back for the New York Red Bulls in 2017. In 2018, Long had a career breakout season, earning a spot as a MLS All-Star, winning MLS Defender of the Year Award, and helping the Red Bulls win the Supporters' Shield. His performance that season helped earn Long his debut for the United States against Peru.

== Youth and college ==
Long graduated from Serrano High School where he lettered in both football and soccer. Long played four years of college soccer at UC Riverside between 2010 and 2013, recording 13 goals and 5 assists during those years. While at college, Long also appeared for USL PDL club FC Tucson during their 2012 and 2013 seasons.

== Professional career ==
=== Portland Timbers ===
Long was drafted by Portland Timbers in the second round (36th overall) of the 2014 MLS SuperDraft. After signing with Portland, Long was loaned to their USL Pro affiliate Sacramento Republic, where he made his debut on March 29, 2014, in a 1–1 draw against LA Galaxy II. He also played for Orange County Blues during the 2014 season on a short-term loan. Long was released by Portland on July 2, 2014.

=== Seattle Sounders FC ===
Long joined Seattle Sounders FC during the 2014 season, but did not make an appearance with the first team. On March 14, 2015, Long signed with Seattle Sounders FC 2. On July 12, 2015, Long scored his first goal as a professional in a 4–0 victory over Arizona United SC. He was a regular starter for Sounders 2 playing as a midfielder before being converted to centerback, appearing in 28 matches and recording one goal and two assists.

=== New York Red Bulls ===
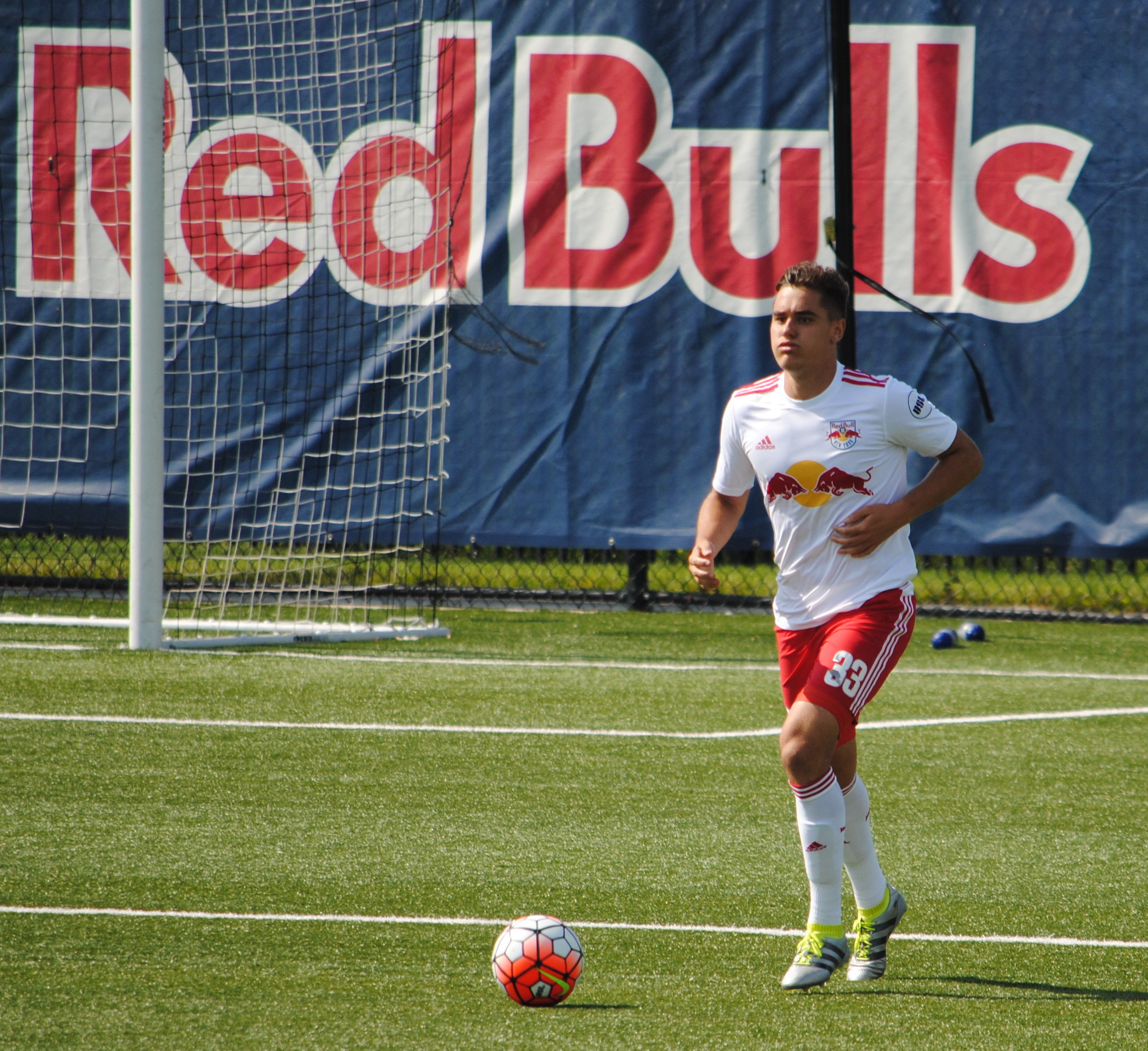
Long with the New York Red Bulls II in 2016

Long went on trial with New York Red Bulls during the 2016 pre-season, and on March 10, 2016, signed with affiliate club New York Red Bulls II. Long made his official debut for the club appearing as a starter in a 2–2 draw against Toronto FC II. On June 19, 2016, Long scored his first goal for the club helping them to a 2–2 draw at Orlando City B. On June 26, 2016, Long helped New York to a 4–1 victory against the Wilmington Hammerheads scoring the club's second goal of the match.

On August 16, 2016, Long made his debut for the Red Bulls first team, appearing as a starter in a 1–1 draw against Alianza F.C. in the CONCACAF Champions League. On October 2, 2016, Long scored two goals to help New York Red Bulls II advance to the Eastern Conference Semifinals of the 2016 USL Playoffs in a 4–0 victory over Orlando City B. On October 18, 2016, Long was named to the 2016 USL All-League First Team. Days later Long helped the club to a 5–1 victory over Swope Park Rangers in the 2016 USL Cup Final. Long was named as the 2016 USL Defender of the Year after leading a defense that conceded the fewest goals in the league during the regular season.

On September 2, 2017, Long scored his first goal with New York Red Bulls in a 2–2 draw at FC Dallas. He ended his first full season with the first team appearing in 41 matches and scoring 1 goal, establishing himself as a first choice center-back.

On March 31, 2018, Long scored his first goal of the 2018 season for the New York Red Bulls in a 4–3 loss to Orlando City SC. On June 6, 2018, Long scored the second goal of the match in New York's 4–0 derby win over New York City FC in the fourth round of the 2018 Lamar Hunt U.S. Open Cup. On June 23, 2018, Long scored another goal in a 3–0 victory over FC Dallas. On July 29, 2018, Long was named to the MLS All-Star Team for their 2018 friendly against Juventus FC Long was named 2018 MLS defender of the year after leading the Red Bull's defense in conceding only 33 goals all season long as the club captured the 2018 MLS Supporters' Shield.

In May during the 2021 MLS season, Long ruptured his Achilles tendon, which ruled him out for the remainder of the season. On February 26, 2022, after a long absence due to injury, Long appeared as a starter in a 3–1 victory over San Jose Earthquakes in the opening match of the 2022 season. On March 5, 2022, Long scored his first goal of the season in a 4–1 victory over Toronto FC. On July 12, 2022, Long was named to the MLS All-Star Team for the second time in his career, this time for their 2022 friendly against the Liga MX All-Stars.

=== Los Angeles FC ===
On January 4, 2023, Long signed a two-year contract with Los Angeles FC. He was a free agent and attracted offers from Seattle Sounders FC, Inter Miami CF, Monterrey, Cruz Azul, and two unnamed English clubs.

== International career ==
On September 2, 2018, Long received his first call-up to the United States national team. He made his first international appearance in a 1–1 draw against Peru. The following year, he captained the national team in a 3–0 friendly victory against Panama on January 27, 2019. In June 2019, he was called up to his first international tournament when Gregg Berhalter named him to the final roster for the 2019 CONCACAF Gold Cup. On June 22, 2019, Long scored his first two international goals in a Gold Cup victory over Trinidad and Tobago.

== Career statistics ==
=== Club ===
As of match played November 1, 2026

Appearances and goals by club, season and competition
Club	Season	League			National cup		Continental		Other		Total	
Club	Season	Division	Apps	Goals	Apps	Goals	Apps	Goals	Apps	Goals	Apps	Goals
Portland Timbers	2014	MLS	0	0	—		—		—		0	0
Sacramento Republic (loan)	2014	USL	2	0	—		—		—		2	0
Orange County Blues (loan)	2014	USL	3	0	—		—		—		3	0
Seattle Sounders FC	2014	MLS	0	0	—		—		—		0	0
Seattle Sounders FC 2	2015	USL	27	1	2	0	—		1 (Note: Appearance(s) in USL Cup Playoffs)	0	30	1
New York Red Bulls II	2016	USL	22	2	—		—		4	2	26	4
New York Red Bulls	2016	MLS	0	0	—		3 (Note: Appearance(s) in CONCACAF Champions League/Cup)	0	—		3	0
New York Red Bulls	2017	MLS	31	1	5	0	2	0	3 (Note: Appearance(s) in MLS Cup playoffs)	0	41	1
New York Red Bulls	2018	MLS	34	3	1	1	6	0	4	0	45	4
New York Red Bulls	2019	MLS	24	2	—		4	0	1	0	29	2
New York Red Bulls	2020	MLS	16	2	—		—		1	0	17	2
New York Red Bulls	2021	MLS	5	0	—		—		—		5	0
New York Red Bulls	2022	MLS	29	4	5	1	—		1	0	35	5
New York Red Bulls	Total		139	12	11	2	15	0	10	0	175	14
Los Angeles FC	2023	MLS	21	0	0	0	7	0	7 (Note: Three appearances in Leagues Cup, four appearances in MLS Cup playoffs)	0	35	0
Los Angeles FC	2024	MLS	29	1	3	0	—		11 (Note: Seven appearances in Leagues Cup, four appearances in MLS Cup playoffs)	0	43	1
Los Angeles FC	2025	MLS	15	1	—		6	2	4 (Note: One appearance in FIFA Club World Cup play-in, three appearances in FIFA Club World Cup)	0	25	3
Los Angeles FC	2026	MLS	17	0	—		2	0	1 (Note: Appearance in Leagues Cup)	0	20	0
Los Angeles FC	Total		82	2	3	0	15	2	23	0	123	4
Career total			275	17	16	2	30	2	38	2	359	23

=== International ===
As of match played July 12, 2023

Appearances and goals by national team and year
National team	Year	Apps	Goals
United States	2018	2	0
United States	2019	14	3
United States	2020	2	0
United States	2021	3	0
United States	2022	8	0
United States	2023	6	0
Total		35	3

As of match played November 15, 2019
Scores and results list United States' goal tally first, score column indicates score after each Long goal.

List of international goals scored by Aaron Long
No.	Date	Venue	Opponent	Score	Result	Competition
1	June 22, 2019	FirstEnergy Stadium, Cleveland, United States	Trinidad and Tobago	1–0	6–0	2019 CONCACAF Gold Cup
2	June 22, 2019	FirstEnergy Stadium, Cleveland, United States	Trinidad and Tobago	6–0	6–0	2019 CONCACAF Gold Cup
3	November 15, 2019	Exploria Stadium, Orlando, United States	Canada	3–0	4–1	2019–20 CONCACAF Nations League A

== Honors ==
New York Red Bulls II

- USL Cup: 2016

New York Red Bulls

- Supporters' Shield: 2018

Los Angeles FC

- U.S. Open Cup: 2024

Individual

- USL Defender of the Year: 2016
- MLS All-Star: 2018, 2022
- MLS Defender of the Year: 2018
- MLS Best XI: 2018
- CONCACAF Gold Cup Best XI: 2019
- CONCACAF Champions League Best XI: 2023
