= Kyle Duncan (soccer) =

American soccer player (born 1997)

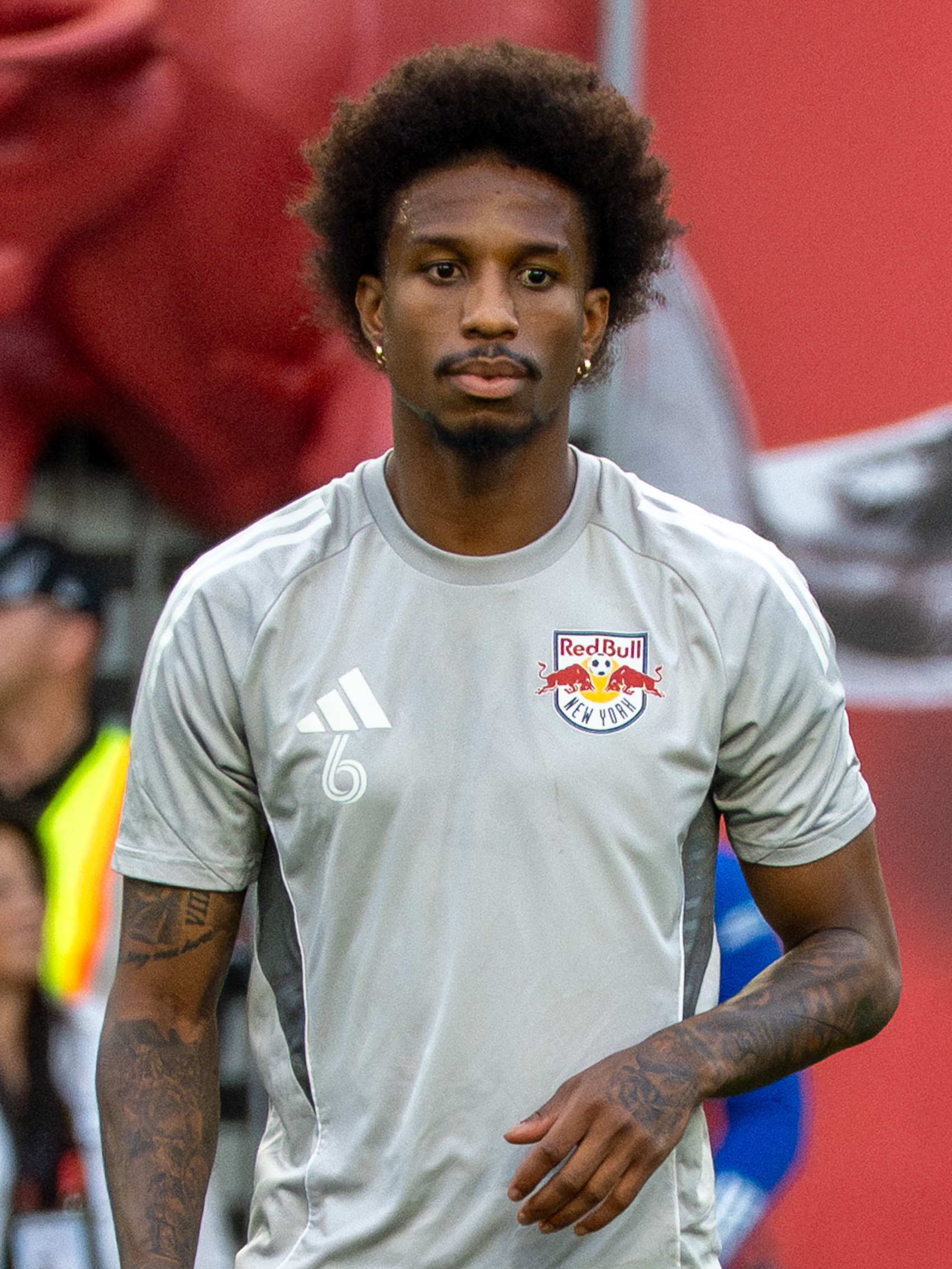
- Duncan with the New York Red Bulls in 2025

Personal information
- Full name: Kyle Barri Duncan
- Date of birth: August 8, 1997 (age 29)
- Place of birth: Brooklyn, New York, United States
- Height: 5 ft 10 in (1.78 m)
- Position: Right-back

Team information
- Current team: Minnesota United
- Number: 3

Youth career
- New York Red Bulls

Senior career*
Years	Team	Apps	(Gls)
2015–2016	Valenciennes II	3	(0)
2016–2017	Valenciennes	0	(0)
2018–2021	New York Red Bulls	72	(5)
2019	→ New York Red Bulls II	8	(1)
2022–2023	Oostende	7	(0)
2022–2023	→ New York Red Bulls (loan)	34	(0)
2024–2025	New York Red Bulls	41	(1)
2026–	Minnesota United	0	(0)

International career
2015–2016	United States U18	2	(0)
2015	United States U20	1	(0)
2019	United States U23	2	(0)
2020	United States	1	(0)
- * Club domestic league appearances and goals as of October 24, 2025

Kyle Barri Duncan (born August 8, 1997) is an American professional soccer player who plays as a right-back for Major League Soccer club Minnesota United.

== Career ==
=== Youth ===
Born in Brooklyn, New York, Duncan began his career in the New York Red Bulls Academy. On August 6, 2014, Duncan played with the Red Bulls reserve team against United Soccer League team Harrisburg City Islanders, and he started all 13 games in the Red Bulls under-18s 2014 fall season. Duncan declined a professional contract with New York Red Bulls II in 2015, instead pursuing opportunities in Europe.

=== Valenciennes ===
In October 2015, Duncan signed a two-year contract with Ligue 2 side Valenciennes. During his first season at the club, he played for Valenciennes II in Championnat National 3, making his debut on May 14, 2016, starting at right back in a 2–1 loss to Olympique Noisy-le-Sec. Duncan was promoted to the first team for the 2016–17 season, but did not make any appearances in Ligue 2.

=== New York Red Bulls ===
After two seasons with Valenciennes, Duncan returned to the US for pre-season training with the Red Bulls in January 2018. The Red Bulls announced on March 9, 2018, that they had signed Duncan to a Major League Soccer contract due to his "attitude and work ethic during preseason." He started in the Red Bulls' MLS season opener against Portland Timbers the next day; television commentator Jonathan Yardley described Duncan as "dominating" and that he "totally manhandled" his experienced direct opponent, Sebastián Blanco, in the 4–0 win.

On March 15, 2018, the New York Red Bulls entered into a loan agreement with New York Red Bulls II, and Duncan was listed on the Red Bulls II 2018 USL season roster. However, he started his second MLS game with New York Red Bulls two days later, against Real Salt Lake. Duncan earned his first MLS assist against Minnesota United on March 24, 2018. His season was cut short due to an ACL injury suffered against Orlando City SC on March 31, 2018.

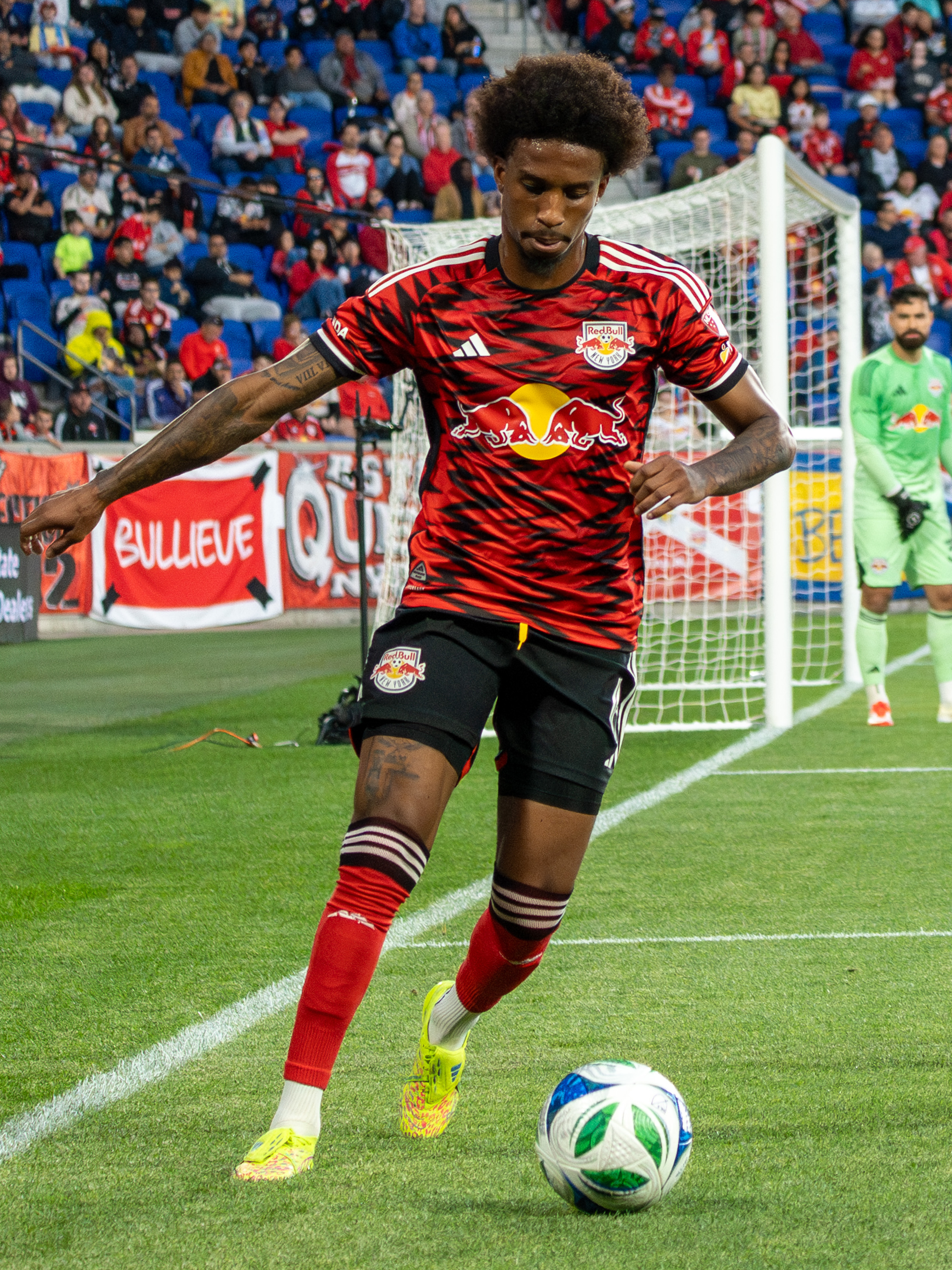
Kyle Duncan during New York Red Bulls vs Atlanta United May 31 2025

After not featuring regularly for the first team, Duncan was loaned to New York Red Bulls II during the 2019 season. On August 21, 2019, he scored his first goal as a professional in 2–1 victory over Nashville SC at First Tennessee Park. After a few impressive performances with the second team he was recalled to the first team. On September 19, 2019, Duncan scored his first MLS goal in a 2–0 victory over Portland Timbers at Providence Park.

Duncan began the 2020 campaign as a starter for New York. On March 1, he opened the season for New York scoring the first goal of the season and assisting on two others in a 3–2 victory over FC Cincinnati. On August 20, 2020, Duncan scored the loan goal for Red Bulls in a 1–0 victory over rival New York City FC in the Hudson River Derby. On October 24, 2020, Duncan opened the scoring for New York in a 2–2 draw with Chicago Fire FC at Soldier Field. On December 21, 2020, Duncan was named New York Red Bulls Defensive Player of the Year for the 2020 season.

On June 18, 2021, Duncan helped New York to a 2–0 victory over Nashville SC, scoring his lone goal of the season. He ended the 2021 season as one of New Yorks' top performers, appearing in 33 matches scoring one goal and providing three assists.

=== Oostende ===
On November 26, 2021, Duncan joined Belgian club Oostende on a free transfer. On January 21, 2022, Duncan was in the starting 11 on his debut during a 2–1 loss against Antwerp. Duncan played the entire match as a right wing-back. On February 19, 2022, Duncan played 73 minutes for Oostende in a 1-0 famous victory over Standard Liège. Duncan ended his first season in Belgium appearing in seven matches, all as a starter.

==== Loan return to New York Red Bulls ====
On August 5, 2022, it was announced that Duncan would be returning to New York Red Bulls on loan until the end of the 2022 season. On January 15, 2023, Duncan was once again sent on loan to Red Bulls for the 2023 MLS season

=== Back to New York Red Bulls ===
At the end of the 2023 MLS season, the New York Red Bulls exercised the permanent transfer option on Duncan through the 2025 MLS season. On July 20, 2024, Duncan scored his first goal of the season in a 3–1 victory over FC Cincinnati. On November 26, 2025, the team announced that they had declined his contract option.

=== Minnesota United ===
On February 13, 2026, Minnesota United FC announced the signing of Duncan on a free transfer. The deal would be through the 2026 season with a club option through June 2027. Already Duncan has seemed to integrate well into the club, with his first goal coming against San Diego in a 2-1 victory for the Loons.

== International career ==
=== United States ===
Duncan has represented the United States at the under-18, under-20, and senior levels. Duncan made his senior national team debut on December 9, 2020, being substituted for Julián Araujo in the 74th minute of a 6–0 friendly victory versus El Salvador.

=== Jamaica ===
On August 29, 2025, Duncan received a call-up from the Jamaica national team for a World Cup qualifier versus Bermuda.

== Personal life ==
He is a cousin of fellow professional soccer player Timothy Weah.

== Career statistics ==
=== Club ===
As of match played October 18, 2025

Appearances and goals by club, season and competition
Club	Season	League			National cup (Note: Includes U.S. Open Cup)		Continental		Other		Total	
Club	Season	Division	Apps	Goals	Apps	Goals	Apps	Goals	Apps	Goals	Apps	Goals
Valenciennes II	2015–16	Championnat de France Amateur 2	3	0	—		—		—		3	0
New York Red Bulls	2018	Major League Soccer	4	0	—		—		—		4	0
New York Red Bulls	2019	Major League Soccer	13	1	1	0	2 (Note: Appearances in CONCACAF Champions League)	0	—		16	1
New York Red Bulls	2020	Major League Soccer	23	3	—		—		1 (Note: Appearance(s) in MLS Cup Playoffs)	0	24	3
New York Red Bulls	2021	Major League Soccer	32	1	—		—		1	0	33	1
New York Red Bulls	Total		72	5	1	0	2	0	2	0	77	5
New York Red Bulls II (loan)	2019	USL Championship	8	1	—		—		—		8	1
Oostende	2021–22	Jupiler Pro League	7	0	—		—		—		7	0
New York Red Bulls (loan)	2022	Major League Soccer	9	0	—		—		1	0	10	0
New York Red Bulls (loan)	2023	Major League Soccer	25	0	—		4 (Note: Appearances in Leagues Cup)	0	3	0	32	0
New York Red Bulls (loan)	Total		34	0	—		4	0	4	0	42	0
New York Red Bulls	2024	Major League Soccer	21	1	—		2	0	0	0	23	1
New York Red Bulls	2025	Major League Soccer	20	0	2	0	2	0	0	0	24	0
New York Red Bulls	Total		41	1	2	0	4	0	0	0	47	1
Career total			165	7	3	0	10	0	6	0	184	7

=== International ===
As of match played December 9, 2020

Appearances and goals by national team and year
National team	Year	Apps	Goals
United States	2020	1	0
Total		1	0

== Honors ==
New York Red Bulls

- MLS Supporters' Shield: 2018

Individual

- New York Red Bulls Defensive Player of the Year: 2020
