= Kyle Zajec =

American soccer player (born 1997)

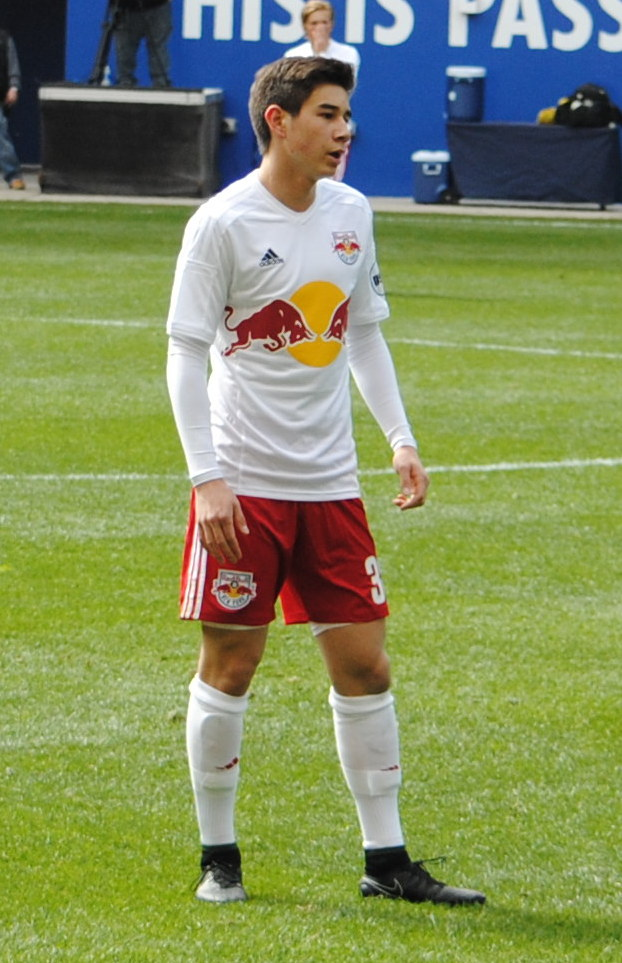

Personal information
- Date of birth: March 28, 1997 (age 29)
- Place of birth: Westport, Connecticut, United States
- Height: 6 ft 0 in (1.83 m)
- Position: Midfielder

Youth career
- 2002–2011: Beachside SC
- 2011–2015: New York Red Bulls

College career
Years	Team	Apps	(Gls)
2015–2018	Georgetown Hoyas	62	(5)

Senior career*
Years	Team	Apps	(Gls)
2015	New York Red Bulls II	3	(0)
2016–2018	New York Red Bulls U-23	34	(2)
2019–2021	New York Red Bulls II	43	(5)
- * Club domestic league appearances and goals as of November 4, 2021

Kyle Zajec (born March 28, 1997) is an American soccer player who most recently played as a midfielder.

== Career ==
=== Early career ===
Zajec started his career with the New York Red Bulls academy when he was 13. After an impressive academy career, Zajec verbally committed to join the Georgetown University Hoyas in 2015. In his four season with the Hoyas, Zajec appeared in 62 matches and scored five goals. During his college years, Zajec also played for New York Red Bulls U-23.

=== Professional ===
On March 27, 2015, it was announced that Zajec had signed an amateur agreement to play for the New York Red Bulls II of the United Soccer League. The deal would allow him to play competitive soccer in a professional league without losing his college eligibility. On March 28, 2015, Zajec made his debut for Red Bulls II against Rochester Rhinos. He started and played the whole match as the Red Bulls II drew 0–0.

On March 8, 2019, Zajec signed his first professional contract with New York Red Bulls II. On May 31, 2019, Zajec scored his first two goals as a professional in a 4–0 victory over Bethlehem Steel FC.

Following the 2021 season, Zajec's contract option was declined by New York.

== Career statistics ==
As of May 24, 2015

Club	Season	League			League Cup		Domestic Cup		International		Total	
Club	Season	Division	Apps	Goals	Apps	Goals	Apps	Goals	Apps	Goals	Apps	Goals
New York Red Bulls II	2015	USL	3	0	0	0	0	0	—	—	3	0
New York Red Bulls U-23	2016	USL2	12	0	0	0	0	0	0	0	12	0
New York Red Bulls U-23	2017	USL2	9	0	0	0	0	0	0	0	9	0
New York Red Bulls U-23	2018	USL2	13	2	2	1	0	0	0	0	15	3
New York Red Bulls II	2019	USL	20	4	0	0	0	0	—	—	20	4
New York Red Bulls II	2020	USL	4	0	0	0	0	0	—	—	4	0
New York Red Bulls II	2021	USL	0	0	0	0	0	0	—	—	0	0
Career total			61	6	2	1	0	0	0	0	63	7
