= Jared Stroud =

American soccer player (born 1996)

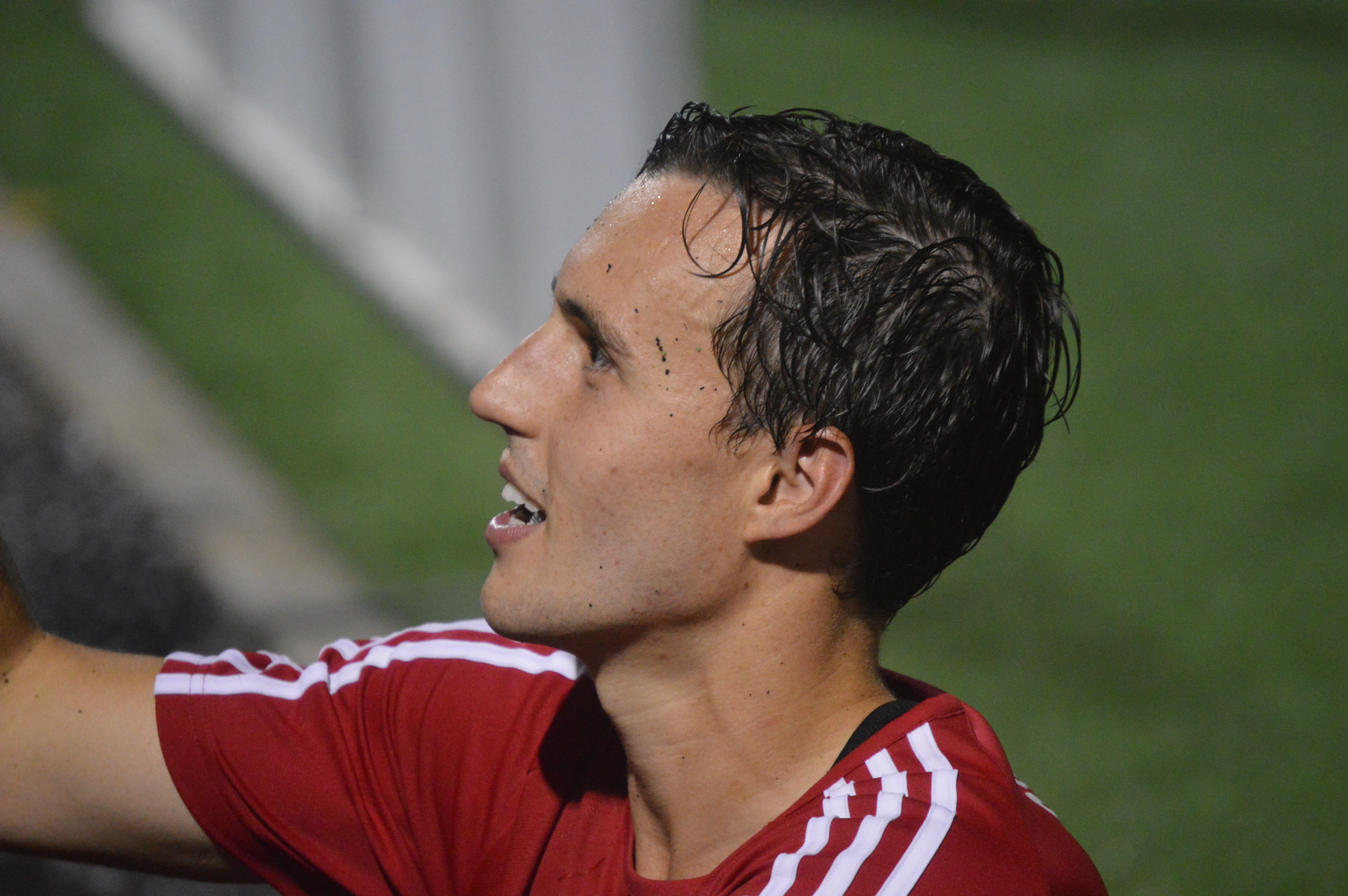

Personal information
- Full name: Jared Presson Stroud
- Date of birth: July 10, 1996 (age 30)
- Place of birth: Chester Borough, New Jersey, U.S.
- Height: 5 ft 10 in (1.78 m)
- Position: Winger

Team information
- Current team: D.C. United
- Number: 8

Youth career
- PDA

College career
Years	Team	Apps	(Gls)
2014–2017	Colgate Raiders	82	(10)

Senior career*
Years	Team	Apps	(Gls)
2015–2017	New York Red Bulls U-23	27	(6)
2018–2020	New York Red Bulls II	63	(22)
2020	New York Red Bulls	20	(0)
2021–2022	Austin FC	27	(1)
2022–2023	St. Louis City SC	31	(5)
2024–	D.C. United	83	(4)
- * Club domestic league appearances and goals as of October 21, 2026

Jared Presson Stroud (born July 10, 1996) is an American professional soccer player who plays as a winger for Major League Soccer club D.C. United.

== Youth and college soccer ==
Stroud grew up in Chester Borough, New Jersey and played high school soccer at the Delbarton School. He played four years of college soccer at Colgate University between 2014 and 2017. A three time All-Patriot League pick and two-time All-Region honoree, Stroud etched his name into the Colgate record books during his four-year career. Stroud set single-season (13) and career (30) assists records during his senior season to help lead Colgate to its first-ever Sweet 16 appearance. He earned Patriot League Tournament MVP honors as a senior after guiding the Raiders to their second-straight league title in 2017.

Stroud finished his career in the Maroon and White with 50 points behind 10 goals and a school-record 30 assists. The four-year starter earned first team All-Patriot League honors as a junior and senior after collecting second team plaudits as a sophomore. He earned All-Region honors in each of his last two seasons. Stroud guided the Raiders to two Patriot League Tournament championships, one regular-season championship and the program's first-ever NCAA Tournament wins during his time at Colgate. Stroud in his youth also brushed shoulders with younger cousin, Jack Queenan.

While with the Raiders, Stroud also appeared for Premier Development League side New York Red Bulls U-23.

== Professional career ==
=== New York Red Bulls ===
On January 21, 2018, Stroud was drafted in the fourth round (83rd overall) of the 2018 MLS SuperDraft by New York Red Bulls. On March 15, 2018, Stroud signed with New York Red Bulls II of the United Soccer League. Stroud was named to the league's team of the week bench for his performance on June 9, 2018, in which he recorded his fifth assist of the season in a 4–2 victory over Charlotte Independence. On July 13, 2018. Stroud scored the first three goals of his professional career in a 5–1 victory over Richmond Kickers. On July 28 he opened the scoring for New York in a 2–2 draw with Tampa Bay Rowdies. Stroud ended his first season at the club scoring 7 goals and providing a team leading 11 assists.

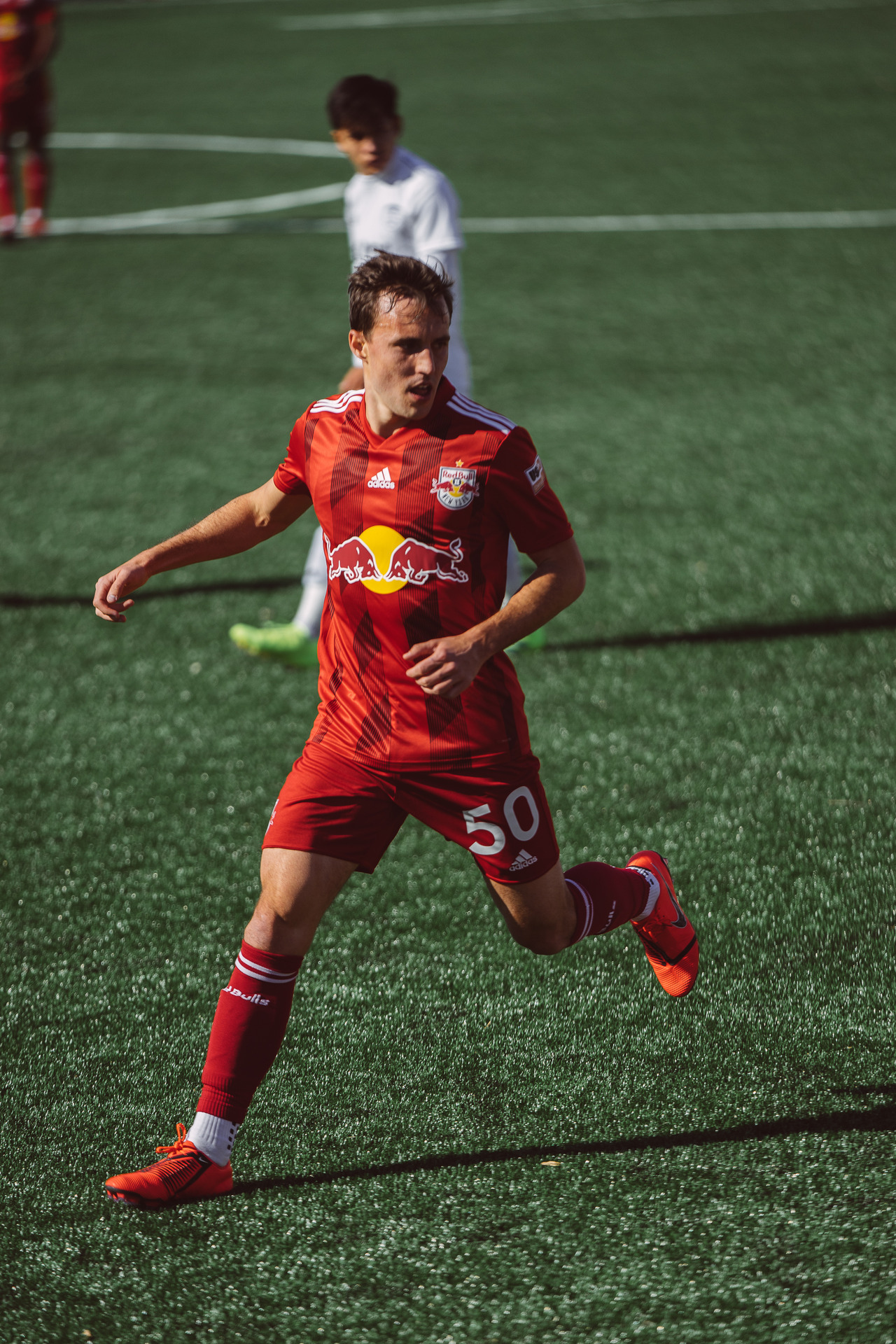
Stroud featuring for RBII

Stroud had another strong season with New York Red Bulls II in 2019 scoring a team leading 15 goals and 9 assists. At the conclusion of the season he was named to the USL Championship All-League First Team.

On January 7, 2020, Stroud made the move to the New York Red Bulls first team roster in MLS.

=== Austin FC ===
On December 15, 2020, Stroud was selected by Austin FC in the 2020 MLS Expansion Draft. On November 3, 2021, Stroud scored his first MLS goal for Austin FC against Sporting Kansas City. After initially having his contract option declined at the end of the 2021 season, Stroud re-signed with the club on December 17, 2021.

=== St. Louis City SC ===
On November 7, 2022, he was traded to St. Louis City SC in exchange for $100,000 of General Allocation Money.

=== D.C. United ===
On December 12, 2023, Stroud and Lucas Bartlett were traded to D.C. United along with $300,000 of General Allocation Money in exchange for midfielder Chris Durkin.

In his first season with D.C. United, Stroud recorded 10 assists, his most in a single season since joining MLS.

== Personal life ==
Stroud was born in the United States, and is of English descent through his father. He is the older brother of the soccer player Peter Stroud.

== Career statistics ==
As of October 19, 2025

Club	Season	League			League cup (Note: Includes MLS Cup Playoffs, PDL Playoffs, USL Championship Playoffs and USL Cup Playoffs)		National cup		Continental		Total	
Club	Season	Division	Apps	Goals	Apps	Goals	Apps	Goals	Apps	Goals	Apps	Goals
New York Red Bulls U-23	2015	PDL	10	3	4	0	–		–		14	3
New York Red Bulls U-23	2016	PDL	9	1	–		0	0	–		9	1
New York Red Bulls U-23	2017	PDL	8	2	1	0	–		–		9	2
New York Red Bulls U-23	Club Total		27	6	5	0	0	0	0	0	32	6
New York Red Bulls II	2018	USL	29	7	3	0	–		–		32	7
New York Red Bulls II	2019	USL Championship	33	15	2	0	–		–		35	15
New York Red Bulls II	2020	USL Championship	1	0	–		–		–		1	0
New York Red Bulls II	Club Total		63	22	5	0	0	0	0	0	68	22
New York Red Bulls	2020	MLS	20	0	1	0	–		–		21	0
Austin FC	2021	MLS	22	1	–		–		–		22	1
Austin FC	2022	MLS	5	0	0	0	0	0	–		5	0
Austin FC	Club Total		27	1	0	0	0	0	0	0	28	1
St. Louis City SC	2023	MLS	31	5	2	0	2 (Note: Appearance(s) in U.S. Open Cup)	0	2 (Note: Appearance(s) in Leagues Cup)	0	37	5
D.C. United	2024	MLS	33	3	–		–		3	2	36	5
D.C. United	2025	MLS	29	0	3	1	–		–		32	1
D.C. United	Club Total		62	3	3	1	0	0	3	2	68	6
Career total			230	37	16	1	2	0	5	2	253	40

== Honors ==
St. Louis City SC

- Western Conference (regular season): 2023
