= Mathias Jørgensen (footballer, born 2000) =

Danish footballer (born 2000)

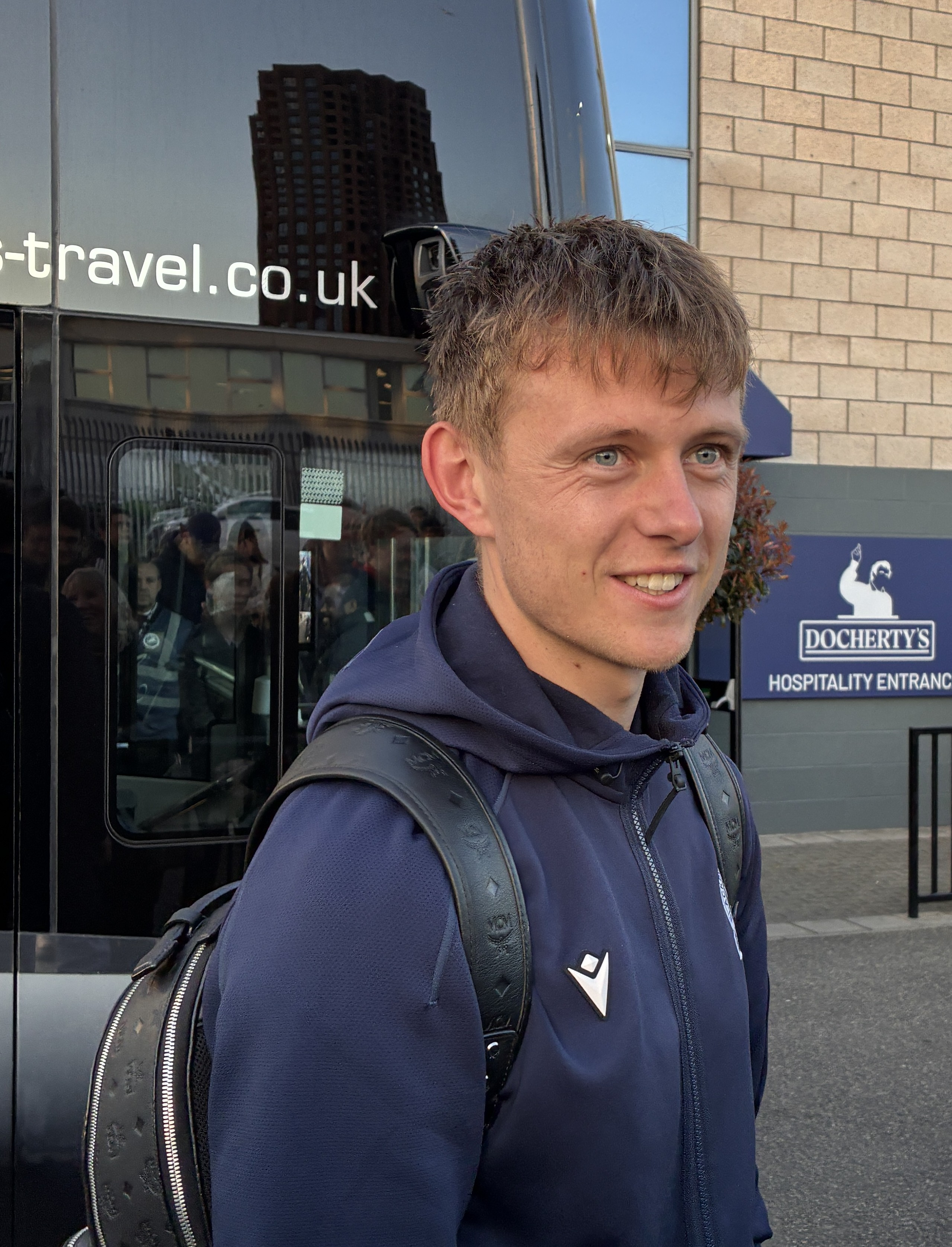
- Jørgensen in 2026 with Blackburn Rovers

Personal information
- Full name: Mathias Jørgensen
- Date of birth: 20 September 2000 (age 26)
- Place of birth: Hundested, Denmark
- Height: 6 ft 1 in (1.85 m)
- Position: Striker

Team information
- Current team: Blackburn Rovers
- Number: 29

Youth career
- Hundested
- Nordsjælland
- 2017–2018: OB

Senior career*
Years	Team	Apps	(Gls)
2018–2019	OB	16	(2)
2019–2021	New York Red Bulls	13	(0)
2019–2021	New York Red Bulls II	38	(13)
2021	→ AGF (loan)	1	(0)
2022–2024	Esbjerg fB	49	(18)
2024–2025	AaB	47	(21)
2025–2026	Bodø/Glimt	10	(4)
2026–	Blackburn Rovers	22	(5)

International career
2017–2018	Denmark U18	4	(0)
2018	Denmark U19	6	(1)
2020	Denmark U21	1	(0)
- * Club domestic league appearances and goals as of 16:53, 18 October 2026 (UTC)

Mathias Jørgensen (born 20 September 2000) is a Danish professional footballer who plays as a striker for EFL Championship club Blackburn Rovers.

== Club career ==
=== Youth ===
Jørgensen began his youth career with local side Hundested before joining the youth squad of Nordsjælland. On 8 January 2017 he signed with the Odense Boldklub youth squad at the age of 16. Jørgensen started to draw the attention of the first team with his play with the U19 squad. On 15 September 2018, he scored four goals with the U19 team in a 4–1 victory over Lyngby. While with OB's U19 team Jørgensen scored 28 goals in 24 matches.

=== OB ===
Jørgensen made his professional debut with OB on 18 April 2018 in a 1–1 draw against Randers FC. For the 2018–19 season he was promoted to the first team. He scored his first goal as a professional on 15 July 2018 in a 3–2 loss to Vendsyssel FF. The following matchday, he also scored in a 2–2 draw against SønderjyskE. On 3 October 2018 Jørgensen scored the second goal for OB in a 2–0 victory over Thisted FC in a Danish Cup match. His play with OB drew the interest of several European clubs, and during January 2019 he joined Borussia Mönchengladbach during a training camp in Spain.

=== New York Red Bulls ===
On 12 February 2019, Jørgensen was transferred to New York Red Bulls for a reported fee of $2.5 million. On 16 March 2019 Jørgensen made his debut for New York, coming on as a late game substitute in a 4–1 victory over San Jose Earthquakes. Following the 2021 season, New York declined their contract option on Jørgensen.

==== Loan to AGF ====
On 8 December 2020, Jørgensen moved on a six-month loan to Danish Superliga side AGF. He left the club again at the end of the season.

=== Esbjerg fB ===
On 26 January 2022 it was confirmed, that Jørgensen had joined Danish 1st Division club Esbjerg fB on a deal until the end of 2024. He made his debut on 25 February, coming off the bench for Lasha Parunashvili in a 4–2 league loss to Fremad Amager.

=== AaB ===
On 1 February 2024, Jørgensen moved to fellow-Superliga club AaB on a contract valid until June 2027. He scored a hat-trick for the club on 29 September 2024 in a 3–0 victory over Sønderjyske.

=== Bodø/Glimt ===
On 24 July 2025, Jørgensen signed with Norwegian Eliteserien club Bodø/Glimt on a four-year contract.

=== Blackburn Rovers ===
On 15 January 2026, Jørgensen was announced as Blackburn Rovers’ second signing of the January transfer window. He signed a three-and-a-half-year contract for an undisclosed fee. On 20 January 2026, Jørgensen made his starting debut for the club, scoring an equaliser in an eventual 3–1 loss to Swansea City. On 13 February, Jørgensen scored a brace in a 3–1 away win against Queens Park Rangers.

== International career ==
Jørgensen was called up to the Denmark national under-18 football team in 2017 and also represented Denmark at the U-19 level. On 19 November 2018 he scored his first goal for Denmark in a 2–0 victory over Switzerland in a friendly match with the U-19 side.

== Career statistics ==
As of match played on 17 October 2026

Appearances and goals by club, season and competition
Club	Season	League			Domestic Cup (Note: Includes Danish Cup)		Continental		Total	
Club	Season	Division	Apps	Goals	Apps	Goals	Apps	Goals	Apps	Goals
OB	2017–18	Danish Superliga	3	0	0	0	—		3	0
OB	2018–19	Danish Superliga	13	2	1	0	—		14	2
OB	Total		16	2	1	0	—		17	2
New York Red Bulls	2019	MLS	5	0	0	0	1 (Note: Appearance in the 2019 CONCACAF Champions League)	0	6	0
New York Red Bulls	2020	MLS	8	0	0	0	0	0	8	0
New York Red Bulls	Total		13	0	0	0	1	0	14	0
New York Red Bulls II (loan)	2019	USL Championship	22	11	0	0	—		22	11
New York Red Bulls II (loan)	2021	USL Championship	16	2	0	0	—		16	2
New York Red Bulls II (loan)	Total		38	13	0	0	—		38	13
AGF (loan)	2020–21	Danish Superliga	1	0	0	0	—		1	0
Esbjerg fB	2021–22	Danish 1st Division	9	1	0	0	—		9	1
Esbjerg fB	2022–23	Danish 2nd Division	24	8	1	0	—		25	8
Esbjerg fB	2023–24	Danish 2nd Division	16	9	1	1	—		17	10
Esbjerg fB	Total		49	18	2	1	—		51	19
AaB	2023–24	Danish 1st Division	14	11	0	0	—		14	11
AaB	2024–25	Danish Superliga	32	10	5	6	—		37	16
AaB	2025–26	Danish 1st Division	1	0	0	0	—		1	0
AaB	Total		47	21	5	6	0	0	52	27
Bodø/Glimt	2025	Eliteserien	10	4	0	0	5 (Note: Appearances in the 2025–26 UEFA Champions League)	0	15	4
Blackburn Rovers	2025–26	Championship	20	5	0	0	0	0	20	5
Blackburn Rovers	2026–27	Championship	2	0	0	0	0	0	2	0
Blackburn Rovers	Total		22	5	0	0	0	0	22	5
Career Total			196	63	8	7	6	0	210	70
