= Chris Lema =

American soccer player (born 1996)

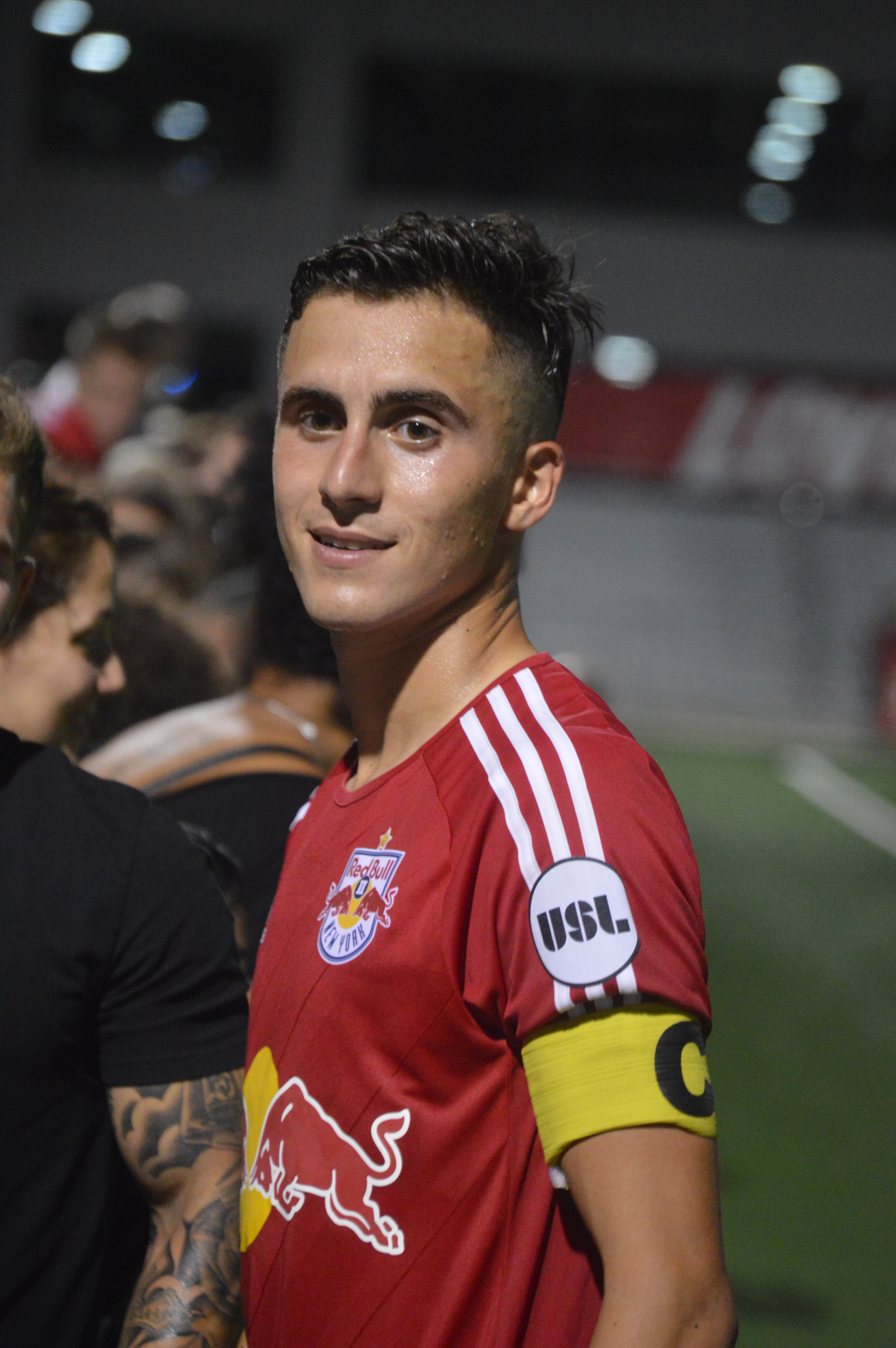

Personal information
- Full name: Christopher Lema
- Date of birth: August 5, 1996 (age 30)
- Place of birth: Ridgefield, New Jersey, United States
- Height: 5 ft 10 in (1.78 m)
- Position: Midfielder

Youth career
- 2010–2014: New York Red Bulls

College career
Years	Team	Apps	(Gls)
2014–2017	Georgetown Hoyas	78	(5)

Senior career*
Years	Team	Apps	(Gls)
2015–2017	New York Red Bulls U-23	31	(5)
2018–2020	New York Red Bulls II	71	(6)
2020	New York Red Bulls	0	(0)
2021	San Antonio FC	26	(0)
- * Club domestic league appearances and goals as of July 26, 2022

Christopher Lema (born August 5, 1996) is an American soccer player who most recently played as a midfielder for USL Championship side San Antonio FC.

== Career ==
=== Youth ===
Lema grew up in Ridgefield, New Jersey and played soccer at Ridgefield Memorial High School. He joined the New York Red Bulls Academy in 2010. He attended college at Georgetown University and played on the Hoyas soccer team for four seasons, making 78 appearances, scoring 5 goals and tallying 12 assists.

While in college, Lema appeared for Premier Development League side New York Red Bulls U-23.

=== New York Red Bulls II ===
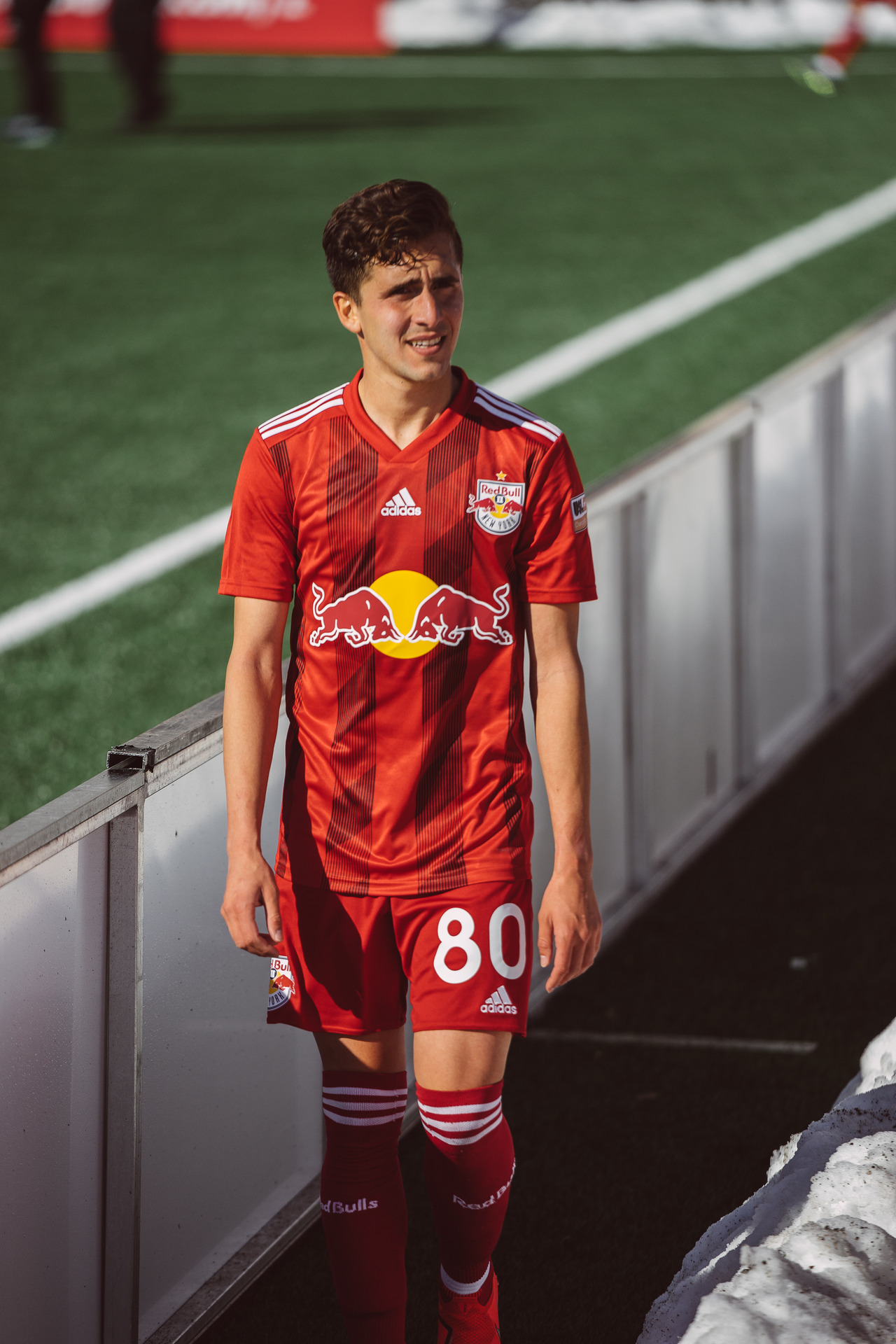

On March 15, 2018, Lema signed his first professional contract with New York Red Bulls II. Lema made his debut with New York Red Bulls II on April 14, 2018, coming on as a substitute in a 5–0 victory over Tampa Bay Rowdies. On July 6, 2018, Lema scored his first goal for New York in a 6–1 victory over Atlanta United 2. In Lema's first season with New York Red Bulls II he helped the club reach the Eastern Conference Final, falling short to the eventual winners Louisville City FC.

On July 17, 2019, Lema scored four goals in an 8–1 victory over Atlanta United 2. As one of the top players in the league, at the conclusion of the 2019 season Lema was named to the USL Championship All-League Second Team.

Lema was released by New York following their 2020 season.

On January 14, 2021, Lema signed for USL Championship side San Antonio FC.

== Career statistics ==
As of March 29, 2020

Club	Season	League		League Cup		US Open Cup		Continental		Total	
Club	Season	Apps	Goals	Apps	Goals	Apps	Goals	Apps	Goals	Apps	Goals
New York Red Bulls U-23	2015	13	2	0	0	0	0	0	0	13	2
New York Red Bulls U-23	2016	11	2	0	0	0	0	0	0	11	2
New York Red Bulls U-23	2017	7	1	1	0	0	0	0	0	8	1
New York Red Bulls U-23	Total	31	5	1	0	0	0	0	0	32	5
New York Red Bulls II	2018	27	1	3	0	0	0	0	0	30	1
New York Red Bulls II	2019	33	5	1	0	0	0	0	0	34	5
New York Red Bulls II	2020	1	0	0	0	0	0	0	0	1	0
Total		61	6	4	0	0	0	0	0	65	6
Career total		92	11	5	0	0	0	0	0	97	11
