= Jean-Christophe Koffi =

Ivorian footballer born 1998

Personal information
- Full name: Jean-Christophe Koffi
- Date of birth: 5 January 1998 (age 28)
- Place of birth: Abidjan, Ivory Coast
- Height: 1.75 m (5 ft 9 in)
- Position: Midfielder

Youth career
- 2011–2015: D.C. United

College career
Years	Team	Apps	(Gls)
2015–2017	Virginia Cavaliers	57	(6)

Senior career*
Years	Team	Apps	(Gls)
2019	New York Red Bulls	0	(0)
2019	New York Red Bulls II	26	(0)
2020	Memphis 901	10	(0)
2021–2022	Sète	1	(0)
2022	Loudoun United	2	(0)
2023–2024	Virginia Dream		
- * Club domestic league appearances and goals as of 19 October 2022

Jean-Christophe Koffi (born 5 January 1998) is an Ivorian professional footballer who plays as a midfielder.

== Early life ==
Koffi was born in Abidjan, Ivory Coast and moved to the United States in 2009. He spent four years in the D.C. United academy from 2011 to 2015, before attending the University of Virginia.

== Club career ==
=== New York Red Bulls ===
On 7 September 2018 it was announced that Koffi signed with the New York Red Bulls, and that he would officially join the club on 1 January 2019. On 9 March 2019 Koffi made his professional debut with New York Red Bulls II in a 3–1 victory over Swope Park Rangers.

=== Sète ===
On 3 November 2021, he signed with Sète in the French third-tier Championnat National.

=== Loudoun United ===
On 11 August 2022, Koffi returned to the United States, joining USL Championship side Loudoun United.

== Career statistics ==
As of 9 March 2019

Club	Season	League		Cup		US Open Cup		CONCACAF		Total	
Club	Season	Apps	Goals	Apps	Goals	Apps	Goals	Apps	Goals	Apps	Goals
New York Red Bulls	2019	0	0	0	0	0	0	0	0	0	0
New York Red Bulls II (loan)	2019	1	0	0	0	0	0	0	0	1	0
Career total		1	0	0	0	0	0	0	0	1	0
