= Amro Tarek =

Egyptian footballer (born 1992)

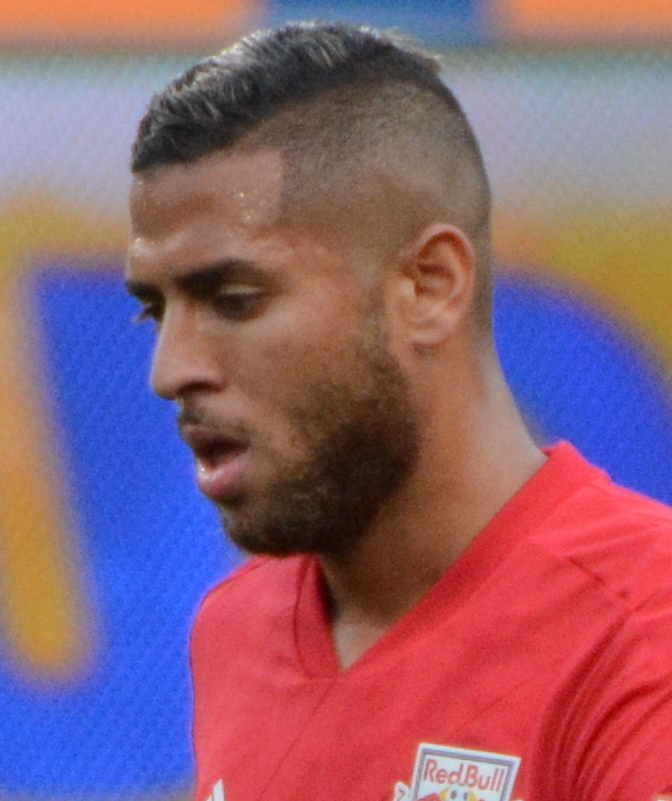
- Tarek with the New York Red Bulls in 2019

Personal information
- Full name: Amr Tarek Abdel-Aziz
- Date of birth: 17 May 1992 (age 34)
- Place of birth: Los Angeles, California, United States
- Height: 1.92 m (6 ft 4 in)
- Position: Defender

Team information
- Current team: Tala'ea El Gaish
- Number: 3

Youth career
- 1999–2009: Asyut Cement
- 2009–2010: ENPPI
- 2010–2011: 1. FC Magdeburg

Senior career*
Years	Team	Apps	(Gls)
2011–2012	SC Freiburg II	15	(0)
2012–2013	VfL Wolfsburg II	20	(1)
2013–2015	El Gouna	45	(0)
2015–2016	Betis	0	(0)
2016	→ Columbus Crew (loan)	1	(0)
2016–2017	ENPPI	23	(0)
2017–2018	Wadi Degla	11	(0)
2018	→ Orlando City (loan)	20	(1)
2019–2021	New York Red Bulls	46	(1)
2019	New York Red Bulls II	1	(0)
2021–2022	El Gouna	24	(1)
2022–2023	Al Masry	7	(0)
2023	Austin FC	0	(0)
2023–	Tala'ea El Gaish	28	(0)

International career^{‡}
2011	Egypt U20	2	(0)
2017–2018	Egypt	2	(0)
- * Club domestic league appearances and goals as of 7 June 2025 ‡ National team caps and goals as of 12 October 2018

Amr Tarek Abdel-Aziz (Arabic: عمرو طارق; born 17 May 1992) is a professional footballer who plays as a defender. Born in the United States, he has represented the Egypt national team.

== Club career ==
=== Early career ===
Born in Los Angeles, California, Tarek moved to Egypt at an early age, settling in Asyut. After being coached by a German manager at Asyut Cement, he joined ENPPI Club in 2009, aged 17; at that time he was mainly used as a striker.

In May 2010 Tarek moved to Europe, joining German side FC Magdeburg, initially on a trial basis. He was subsequently offered a contract and assigned to the under-19 squad.

In the 2011 summer Tarek joined SC Freiburg, being assigned to the reserves in Regionalliga. He scored the first in a 6–0 victory over Serbian side OFK Beograd in the 2011 Lev Yashin Cup final, also featuring regularly during the campaign; he was also converted initially to a left winger and later to a left back in the process.

On 3 May 2012 Tarek signed for another reserve team, VfL Wolfsburg II. Despite extending his contract with the club roughly a year later, he moved to Hajduk Split in August on a trial basis, and after nothing came of it, he returned to the United States in September and played 82 minutes in a 4–1 MLS Reserve League win for Chivas USA Reserves against Portland Timbers Reserves.

=== El Gouna ===
After an unsuccessful trial with German side Bayern Munich, Tarek signed with El Gouna in January 2014. He made his debut for the club on 9 January, playing the full 90 minutes in a 0–1 home loss against Smouha.

Tarek played 15 games in his first season, as his side finished fifth. He was also an undisputed starter in his second, before the league was put on hiatus due to political issues. In November 2014, Tarek underwent a trial with Swiss Super League side FC Luzern. He was also linked to fellow league team Al Ahly SC, but nothing came of it.

=== Betis ===
On 6 July 2015, Tarek signed a four-year deal with Real Betis, newly promoted to La Liga, for an undisclosed fee.

On 13 June 2016, Real Betis announced the termination of Amro Tarek's contract by mutual consent.

=== Columbus Crew ===
On 2 February 2016, Betis announced that Tarek had joined Columbus Crew of Major League Soccer on loan until June 2016 with the option to extend the loan until December 2016. Tarek struggled for playing time with Columbus, and was released by the club on May 5, 2016, after just a single substitute appearance.

=== ENPPI ===
On 15 June 2016, just two days after his contract termination with Real Betis, Tarek returned to Egypt and signed a four-year deal with Ismaily. However, the deal was terminated a month later before his registration was submitted, with Tarek joined fellow Egyptian Premier League side ENPPI. After one season with ENPPI, Tarek terminated his deal.

=== Wadi Delga ===
In August 2017, after originally reaching an agreement to join Smouha SC, he signed with Wadi Degla SC for free instead.

=== Orlando City ===
In February 2018 Tarek made his second loan move to Major League Soccer, this time joining Orlando City. He made his first start in the season opener versus D.C. United and scored his first goal for the club in a 3–3 draw against New England Revolution.

=== New York Red Bulls ===
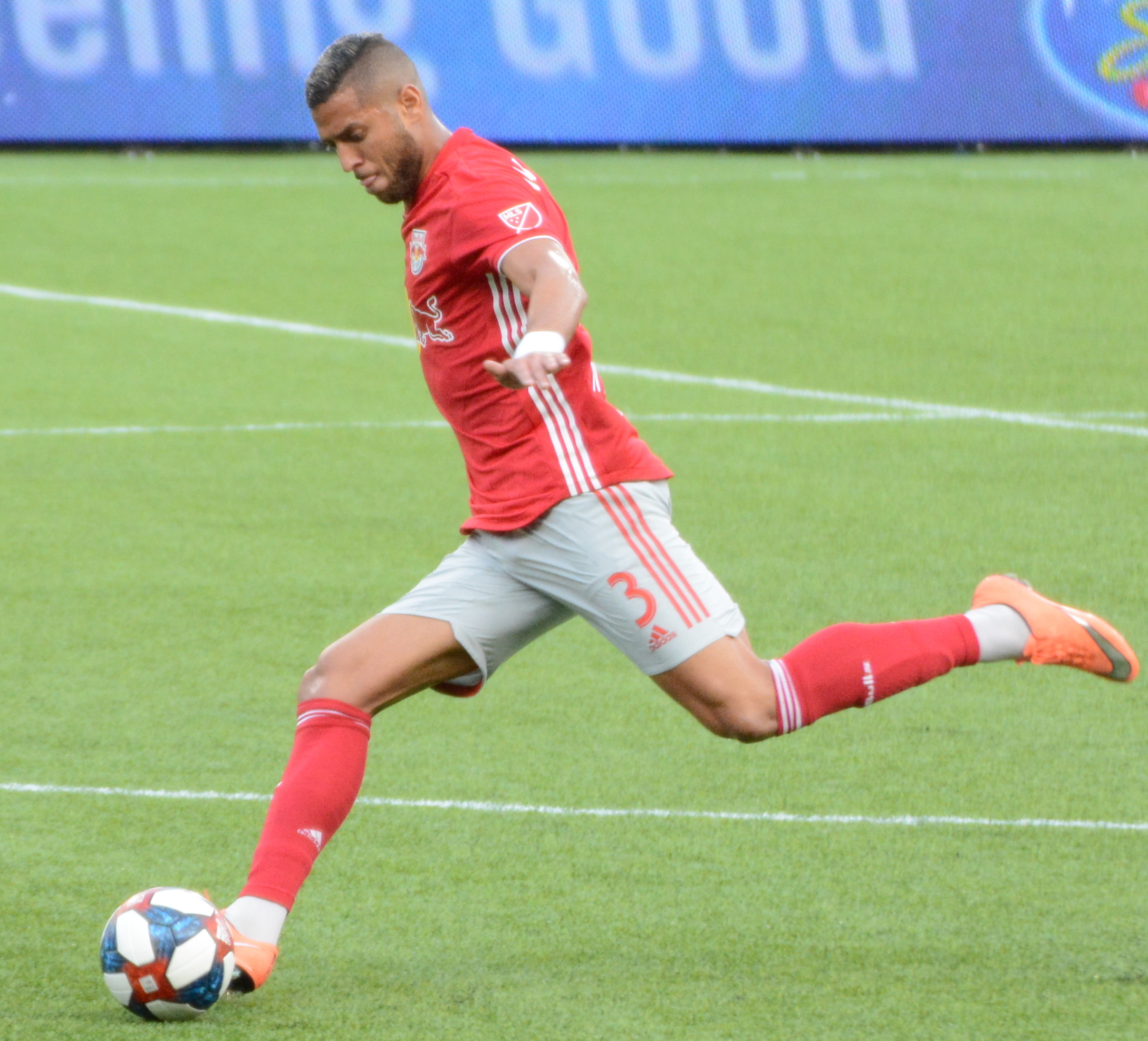
Tarek with the New York Red Bulls in 2019

On 11 December 2018, it was announced that Tarek had been traded to New York Red Bulls in exchange for a fourth-round pick in the 2019 MLS SuperDraft. On 2 March 2019, Tarek made his official debut with the club, appearing as a starter in a 1–1 draw with Columbus Crew on the opening day of the season. On 4 May 2019, Tarek opened the scoring for New York in a 3–2 victory over LA Galaxy. At the conclusion of the 2019 season he was named as the team's Newcomer of the Year.

=== El Gouna ===
On 9 September 2021, Tarek moved to Egyptian Premier League side El Gouna on a 500k transfer + fees.

=== Al Masry SC ===
On 27 September 2022, Tarek moved to Al Masry SC on a free transfer.

=== Austin FC ===
On 27 January 2023, Tarek returned to the United States, joining MLS side Austin FC on a one-year deal. After only appearing in one game for 66 minutes in the first half of the season. In this single game against Violette AC in the Dominican republic, Tarek was responsible for two of the 3 goals with a disastrous own goal to the corner of the net on a failed clearance. Austin FC executed their buyout option to waive Tarek on 26 July 2023.

== International career ==
Tarek was eligible for both the United States and Egypt. Having earned one cap for Egypt's Under-20 team, he was later monitored by the United States under-23s ahead of potential qualification for the 2016 Summer Olympics.

On March 28, 2017, he made his Egypt debut, coming on as a substitute in a 3–0 friendly win over Togo. In May 2018, he was named in Egypt's preliminary squad for the 2018 World Cup in Russia but didn't make the final 23-man roster. It took 19 months for Tarek to gain his second cap and first international start, lining up against Eswatini in a 2019 Africa Cup of Nations qualifier.

== Career statistics ==
=== Club ===
As of 28 April 2026.

Club	Season	League			National Cup		League Cup		International		Total	
Club	Season	Division	Apps	Goals	Apps	Goals	Apps	Goals	Apps	Goals	Apps	Goals
SC Freiburg II	2011–12	Regionalliga Süd	15	0	—		—		—		15	0
SC Freiburg II	Total		15	0	—		—		—		15	0
Wolfsburg II	2012–13	Regionalliga	20	1	—		—		—		20	1
Wolfsburg II	Total		20	1	0	0	—		—		20	1
El Gouna	2013–14	Egyptian Premier League	15	0	1 (Note: Appearance(s) in Egypt Cup)	0	—		—		16	0
El Gouna	2014–15	Egyptian Premier League	30	0	1	0	—		—		31	0
El Gouna	Total		45	0	2	0	—		—		47	0
Columbus Crew (loan)	2016	MLS	1	0	—		—		—		1	0
ENPPI	2016–17	Egyptian Premier League	23	0	2	0	—		—		25	0
ENPPI	Total		23	0	2	0	—		—		25	0
Wadi Degla	2017–18	Egyptian Premier League	11	0	—		—		—		11	0
Wadi Degla	Total		11	—		0	—		—		11	0
Orlando City (loan)	2018	MLS	20	1	2 (Note: Appearance(s) in U.S. Open Cup)	0	—		—		22	1
New York Red Bulls	2019	MLS	20	1	1	0	—		—		21	1
New York Red Bulls	2020	MLS	12	0	—		—		—		12	0
New York Red Bulls	2021	MLS	13	0	—		—		—		13	0
New York Red Bulls	Total		45	1	1	0	—		—		46	1
New York Red Bulls II (loan)	2019	USL Championship	1	0	—		—		—		1	0
El Gouna FC	2021–22	Egyptian Premier League	24	0	—		—		—		24	0
El Gouna FC	Total		24	0	—		—		—		24	0
Al Masry SC	2022–23	Egyptian Premier League	7	0	—		—		—		7	0
Al Masry SC	Total		7	0	—		—		—		7	0
Austin FC	2023	Major League Soccer	0	0	0	0	0	0	1 (Note: Appearance(s) in CONCACAF Champions League)	0	1	0
Austin FC	Total		0	0	0	0	0	0	1	0	7	0
El Gaish	2023-24	Egyptian Premier League	20	0	2	0	4	0	—		26	0
El Gaish	2024-25	Egyptian Premier League	12	0	0	0	4	0	—		16	0
El Gaish	2025-26	Egyptian Premier League	18	2	2	0	4	0	—		24	2
El Gaish	Total		50	2	4	0	12	0	—		66	2
Career total			262	5	11	0	12	0	1	0	286	5

== Honours ==
SC Freiburg

- Lev Yashin Cup: 2011
