= 2020 Philadelphia Union II season =

Philadelphia Union II
2020 season
- Ownership Group: Keystone S&E
- Head coach: Sven Gartung
- Stadium: Talen Energy Stadium
- USLC: Eastern Conf.: 16th Group F: 4th
- USL Playoffs: Did not qualify
- Average home league attendance: 467
- Biggest win: PHI 4–0 LDN (Sept. 16)
- Biggest defeat: PHI 0–6 PIT (July 18); NY 6–0 PHI (Sept. 9)
Home colors	Away colors

The 2020 season was the first season since the rebranding of Philadelphia Union's reserve team from Bethlehem Steel FC to Philadelphia Union II. Union II competed in the USL Championship's Eastern Conference.

== Roster ==
As of March 5, 2020

No.	Pos.	Nation	Player
1	GK	USA	Matt Freese
13	MF	USA	Cole Turner
14	MF	USA	Jack de Vries
35	MF	ESP	David Rabadán (on loan from Atlético Albacete)
36	FW	PAN	Saed Díaz
37	MF	USA	Selmir Miscic
38	MF	USA	Zach Zandi
40	MF	USA	Issa Rayyan
41	FW	GER	Yomi Scintu
42	DF	JAM	Jamoi Topey
43	DF	CMR	Steve Kingue
44	DF	USA	Ben Ofeimu
49	GK	USA	Todd Morton
56	MF	USA	Luis Flores
59	MF	USA	Axel Picazo
60	DF	USA	Nathan Harriel
63	FW	HAI	Shanyder Borgelin
65	MF	USA	Jack McGlynn
66	DF	USA	Million Evans

Signed to first team contract with Philadelphia Union.
Philadelphia Union Academy player.

== Competitive ==
=== USL Championship ===
==== Standings — Group F ====
Pos	Team	Pld	W	D	L	GF	GA	GD	Pts	PPG	Qualification
1	Hartford Athletic	16	11	2	3	31	24	+7	35	2.19	Advance to USL Championship Playoffs
2	Pittsburgh Riverhounds SC	16	11	1	4	39	10	+29	34	2.13	Advance to USL Championship Playoffs
3	New York Red Bulls II	16	5	0	11	30	37	−7	15	0.94	
4	Philadelphia Union II	16	2	3	11	20	45	−25	9	0.56	
5	Loudoun United FC	13	1	3	9	10	28	−18	6	0.46	

Source: USL

==== Match results ====
March 7 1	Philadelphia Union II	0–0	Loudoun United FC	Chester, Pennsylvania
7:30 PM EST	Turner (yellow card) 59'; Ofeimu (yellow card) 85'; Huckaby (yellow card) 87'	Report	Saravia (yellow card) 45+3'	Stadium: Subaru Park; Attendance: 467; Referee: Thomas Snyder

July 18 2	Philadelphia Union II	0–6	Pittsburgh Riverhounds SC	Chester, Pennsylvania
6:30 PM EDT	Harriell (yellow card) 58'	Report	Mensah 29'; Griffin 37'; Velarde 59'; Fernandes 67'; Dos Santos 81', 87'	Stadium: Talen Energy Stadium; Referee: Thomas Snyder

July 22 3	Philadelphia Union II	1–5	New York Red Bulls II	Chester, Pennsylvania
8:36 PM EDT	Miscic 46'; Flores (yellow card) 58'	Report	Corfe 10'; Boateng 53'; Edelman 56'; Fala (yellow card) 58'; Elney 59'; Sowe 75'	Stadium: Talen Energy Stadium; Referee: Christian Centeno

July 25 4	Hartford Athletic	3–2	Philadelphia Union II	Hartford, Connecticut
7:00 PM EDT	Silva (yellow card) 29'; Torres 39'; Jørgensen 43'; Guzmán 53'; McGlynn (yellow card) 66'	Report	Scintu 4'; Picazo 16'; Kingue (yellow card) 90+7'	Stadium: Dillon Stadium; Referee: Thomas Snyder

August 1 5	Pittsburgh Riverhounds SC	4–0	Philadelphia Union II	Pittsburgh, Pennsylvania
7:00 PM EDT	Dos Santos 22', 42'; Vancaeyezeele 36'; James 65'	Report	Picazo (yellow card) 38'; Aaronson (yellow card) 73'; Flores (yellow card) 88'	Stadium: Highmark Stadium; Referee: Kevin Fikar

August 5 6	Philadelphia Union II	3–2	New York Red Bulls II	Chester, Pennsylvania
5:00 PM EDT	Bohui 1'; McGlynn 45+4'; Flores (yellow card) 61'; Jasinski 71'	Report	Elney 37' (pen.); Dieye 43'; Sharifi (yellow card) 54'	Stadium: Talen Energy Stadium; Referee: Joshua Encarnación

August 9 7	Philadelphia Union II	P–P	Hartford Athletic	Chester, Pennsylvania
TBA PM EDT				Stadium: Talen Energy Stadium
Note: Match postponed due to positive covid-19 test in the Union II organization.

August 19 8	Philadelphia Union II	P–P	Hartford Athletic	Chester, Pennsylvania
7:00 PM EDT				Stadium: Talen Energy Stadium
Note: Match postponed due to positive covid-19 test in the Union II organization.

August 23 9	New York Red Bulls II	P–P	Philadelphia Union II	Harrison, New Jersey
TBA PM EDT				Stadium: Red Bull Arena
Note: Match postponed.

September 2 10	Philadelphia Union II	1–2	Atlanta United 2	Chester, Pennsylvania
6:30 PM EDT	Rabadán (yellow card) 39'; Jasinski (yellow card) 47'; Craig (yellow card) 67'; Aaronson 90+6'	Report	Macky Diop 45'; Goodrum (yellow card) 53'; Mejia 90+2'	Stadium: Subaru Park; Referee: Thomas Snyder

September 6 11	Tampa Bay Rowdies	2–0	Philadelphia Union II	St. Petersburg, Florida
9:56 PM EDT	Lasso (yellow card) 4'; Guenzatti 6'; Ekra 39'; Louro (yellow card) 60'	Report	Aaronson (yellow card) 50'; Ofeimu (yellow card) 56'	Stadium: Al Lang Stadium; Attendance: 140; Referee: Tori Penso

September 9 9	New York Red Bulls II	6–0	Philadelphia Union II	Harrison, New Jersey
5:00 PM EDT	Lema (penalty missed) 8'; Sowe 45', 45+2', 74'; Toure 72'; Clark 82', 90'; Zalinsky (yellow card) 89'	Report	Freese (yellow card) 7'; Bohui (yellow card) 88'	Stadium: Red Bull Arena; Referee: Luis Arroyo
Note: Re-schedule of postponed August 23, 2020 match.

September 12 12	Loudoun United FC	1–1	Philadelphia Union II	Leesburg, Virginia
7:00 PM EDT	Lundegard (yellow card) 8' (yellow-red card) 13'; Amoustapha 42'; Gabarra (yellow card) 51'; Ku-DiPietro (yellow card) 90+2'; Gamble (red card) 90+4'	Report	Bohui 10'; Kingue (yellow card) 29'	Stadium: Segra Field; Attendance: 520; Referee: Danielle Chesky

September 16 13	Philadelphia Union II	4–0	Loudoun United FC	Chester, Pennsylvania
7:30 PM EST	Craig 6'; Sorenson 20', (yellow card) 90+3'; Kingue 32'; Huckaby (yellow card) 71'; Stafford 83', (yellow card) 87'	Report	Ndour (yellow card) 29'; Amoustapha (yellow card) 40'; Saravia (yellow card) 90+3'	Stadium: Subaru Park; Referee: Ernie Constantine

September 20 14	Philadelphia Union II	0–3	Hartford Athletic	Chester, Pennsylvania
5:00 PM EDT	Huckaby (yellow card) 34'	Report	Dixon 8', 58'; Topey 13' (o.g.); Strong (yellow card) 44'; Johnson (yellow card) 90'	Stadium: Subaru Park; Referee: Luis Arroyo

September 23 7	Hartford Athletic	1–1	Philadelphia Union II	Hartford, Connecticut
7:00 PM EDT	Strong 45+2', (yellow card) 88'; Cohen (yellow card) 56'; Jørgensen (yellow card) 68'	Report	McGlynn 76'; Aaronson (yellow card) 90'	Stadium: Dillon Stadium; Attendance: 1,375; Referee: Jeremy Scheer
Note: Re-schedule of postponed August 9, 2020 match.

September 26 15	New York Red Bulls II	5–4	Philadelphia Union II	Harrison, New Jersey
5:00 PM EDT	Sowe 13', 19'; Lema (yellow card) 37'; Zalinsky (yellow card) 41'; Dieye (yellow card) 42'; LaCava 65'; Cummins 67'; Fala 86'	Report	McGlynn 43' (pen.), 69'; Topey (yellow card) 46'; Picazo 55'; Flores 90' (pen.)	Stadium: Red Bull Arena; Referee: Ernie Constantine

September 30 8	Philadelphia Union II	2–3	Hartford Athletic	Chester, Pennsylvania
7:00 PM EDT	Budler (yellow card) 7'; Cohen 22' (o.g.); Sorenson (yellow card) 42'; Stafford 60'	Report	Jørgensen 8' (pen.); Lara 15'; Dixon (yellow card) 25'; Strong (yellow card) 55'; Barrera 90'	Stadium: Talen Energy Stadium; Referee: Christian Centeno
Note: Re-schedule of postponed August 19, 2020 match.

October 3 16	Pittsburgh Riverhounds SC	2–1	Philadelphia Union II	Pittsburgh, Pennsylvania
7:00 PM EDT	Lee 15', (yellow card) 37'; Thomas (yellow card) 61'; Dos Santos (yellow card) 70'; Dikwa 90+2'	Report	Cole Turner (yellow card) 43'; Jack McGlynn 63' (pen.), (yellow card) 90+1'	Stadium: Highmark Stadium; Referee: Austin Saini

=== U.S. Open Cup ===
Due to their affiliation with a higher division professional club (Philadelphia Union), Union II is one of 15 teams expressly forbidden from entering the Cup competition.
