= 2019 Bethlehem Steel FC season =

Bethlehem Steel FC
2019 season
- Ownership Group: Keystone S&E
- Head coach: Brendan Burke
- Stadium: Talen Energy Stadium
- USLC: Eastern Conf.: 16th
- USL Playoffs: Did not qualify
- Top goalscorer: Kacper Przybylko (3)
- Highest home attendance: 1,537 (Apr 20 vs. Indy Eleven)
- Lowest home attendance: 219 (May 25 vs. Louisville City)
- Average home league attendance: 503
- Biggest win: 3–0 (June 28 at Hartford); 5–2 (Sep 18 vs Loudoun)
- Biggest defeat: 1–6 (Sep 21 at Tampa); 0–5 (Sep 28 at Memphis)
Home colors	Away colors

The 2019 season was Bethlehem Steel FC's fourth season of competitive soccer in the USL Championship and third season competing in the second division of American soccer. Steel FC competed in the league's Eastern Conference.

== Roster ==
Note: Flags indicate national team as defined under FIFA eligibility rules; some limited exceptions apply. Players may hold more than one non-FIFA nationality. Squad correct as of March 17, 2019.

No.	Pos.	Nation	Player
15	DF	CMR	Olivier Mbaizo
20	FW	COD	Michee Ngalina
21	MF	USA	Anthony Fontana
32	DF	USA	Matthew Real
35	FW	CMR	Faris
36	FW	PAN	Saed Díaz (on loan from Tauro)
37	MF	USA	Selmir Miscic
38	MF	USA	Zach Zandi
39	MF	JAM	Chavany Willis (on loan from Portmore United)
40	MF	USA	Issa Rayyan
41	FW	GER	Yomi Scintu
42	DF	JAM	Jamoi Topey (on loan from Cavalier)
43	DF	CMR	Steve Kingue (on loan from Nfuko Academy)
44	DF	USA	Ben Ofeimu
45	MF	IRL	James Chambers
47	DF	CRC	Walter Cortés (on loan from Saprissa)
49	GK	USA	Todd Morton
51	MF	USA	Cole Turner
53	GK	USA	Ben Martino
54	GK	USA	Lukas Burns
55	MF	USA	Jack de Vries
56	MF	USA	Luis Flores
57	FW	USA	Patrick Bohui
59	MF	USA	Axel Picazo
60	DF	USA	Nathan Harriel
61	MF	USA	Dante Huckaby
63	FW	HAI	Shanyder Borgelin
64	GK	ESA	Tomas Romero
65	GK	USA	Brady McSwain

Signed to first team contract with Philadelphia Union.
Philadelphia Union Academy player.

== Transfers ==
=== In ===
Date	Player	Number	Position	Previous club	Fee/notes
January 8, 2019	(United States) Zach Zandi	38	MF	(United States) Villanova Wildcats	Signed
January 23, 2019	(United States) Ben Ofeimu	44	DF	(United States) Philadelphia Union Academy	Signed
February 25, 2019	(United States) Issa Rayyan	40	MF	(United States) Philadelphia Union Academy	Signed
March 8, 2019	(Italy) Yomi Scintu	41	FW	(Germany) VfB Eichstatt	Signed
April 5, 2019	(United States) Shanyder Borgelin	63	FW	(United States) Philadelphia Union Academy	Signed

=== Out ===
Date	Player	Number	Position	New club	Fee/notes
November 19, 2018	(Jamaica) Omar Holness	36	MF	(England) Darlington	Option declined
November 19, 2018	(Canada) Chris Nanco	37	FW	(Canada) Forge FC	End of contract
November 19, 2018	(Spain) Santi Moar	38	FW	(United States) New Mexico United	End of contract
November 19, 2018	(United States) Drew Skundrich	39	MF	(United States) Sacramento Republic FC	End of contract
November 19, 2018	(United States) Mike Catalano	41	MF	—N/a	Option declined
November 19, 2018	(United States) Aidan Apodaca	42	FW	(United States) Reno 1868 FC	Option declined
November 19, 2018	(United States) Brandon Aubrey	44	DF	—N/a	Option declined
November 19, 2018	(United States) Matt Mahoney	48	DF	(United States) Sacramento Republic FC	Option declined
November 19, 2018	(Grenada) A. J. Paterson	49	MF	(United States) Charleston Battery	Option declined

=== Loan in ===
Date	Player	Number	Position	Previous club	Fee/notes
January 4, 2019	(Panama) Saed Díaz	36	FW	(Panama) Tauro FC	Season loan
January 25, 2019	(Cameroon) Steve Kingue	43	DF	(Cameroon) Nfuko Academy Sports	Season loan
February 27, 2019	(Jamaica) Chavany Willis	42	MF	(Jamaica) Portmore United	Season loan
February 28, 2019	(Costa Rica) Walter Cortes	47	DF	(Costa Rica) Deportivo Saprissa	Season loan
March 1, 2019	(Jamaica) Jamoi Topey	42	DF	(Jamaica) Cavalier	Season loan

== Competitions ==
=== Preseason ===
February 2, 2019 Preseason	D.C. United	1–0	Bethlehem Steel FC	Clearwater, Florida
16:00 EST	Kadono 57'	Report		Stadium: Joe DiMaggio Sports Complex

February 6, 2019 Preseason	Chargers Soccer Club	2–3	Bethlehem Steel FC	Clearwater, Florida
16:00 EST	4'; 70'	Report	Blacklock 33', 40'; Temple (yellow card) 60'; Trialist (yellow card) 74'; Soumah 90'	Stadium: Countryside Sports Plex

February 10, 2019 Preseason	Bethlehem Steel FC	3–0	FC Motown	Wayne, Pennsylvania
9:00 EST	Díaz 22'; Harriel 42'; Zandi 43'	Report		Stadium: YSC Sports

February 13, 2019 Preseason	West Chester United	1–0	Bethlehem Steel FC	West Chester, Pennsylvania
19:30 EST	Gonzalez 59' (pen.)	Report		Stadium: Kildare's Turf

February 16, 2019 Preseason	Villanova Wildcats	1–2	Bethlehem Steel FC
	Faris 4'; Chambers 18'	Report	22'
Note: Closed-door scrimmage

February 20, 2019 Preseason	Loudoun United FC	2–1	Bethlehem Steel FC	Leesburg, Virginia
	Goal	Report	Goal	Stadium: Evergreen Sportsplex
Note: Closed-door scrimmage

February 22, 2019 Preseason	Richmond Kickers	3–0	Bethlehem Steel FC	Leesburg, Virginia
14:00 EST	Jackson 31'; Mwape 58'; Bolduc 90+1' (pen.)	Report		Stadium: Evergreen Sportsplex

February 24, 2019 Preseason	Pittsburgh Riverhounds SC	1–0	Bethlehem Steel FC	Pittsburgh, Pennsylvania
14:00 EST	Volesky 44'	Report	(yellow card) 60'; (yellow card) 76'	Stadium: Highmark Stadium

March 3, 2019 Preseason	Bethlehem Steel FC	3–1	New York Red Bulls II
	Ngalina; Faris; Saed Diaz	Report	Goal

=== USL Championship ===
==== Standings ====
Pos	Team	Pld	W	D	L	GF	GA	GD	Pts
14	Atlanta United 2	34	9	8	17	45	77	−32	35
15	Memphis 901 FC	34	9	7	18	37	52	−15	34
16	Bethlehem Steel FC	34	8	7	19	49	78	−29	31
17	Hartford Athletic	34	8	5	21	49	80	−31	29
18	Swope Park Rangers	34	6	8	20	46	80	−34	26

Source: USL Championship Standings
Rules for classification: 1) total wins; 2) total goal differential; 3) total goals scored; 4) points earned against top four Conference finishers; 5) disciplinary points; 6) coin toss or drawing of lots

==== Match results ====
All times in Eastern Time.

March 10 1	Birmingham Legion FC	0–2	Bethlehem Steel FC	Birmingham, Alabama
7:00 PM	Lopez (yellow card) 42'; Hollinger-Janzen (yellow card) 73'; Avila (yellow card) 90+5'	Report	Przybyłko 53'; Zandi 68'; Díaz (yellow card) 76'	Stadium: BBVA Compass Field; Attendance: 5,807; Referee: Ismir Pekmic

March 16 2	Bethlehem Steel FC	0–1	North Carolina FC	Chester, Pennsylvania
7:00 PM		Report	Lomis 51'; Guillén (yellow card) 63'	Stadium: Talen Energy Stadium; Attendance: 737; Referee: Lorant Varga

March 24 3	Bethlehem Steel FC	0–1	Memphis 901 FC	Chester, Pennsylvania
6:00 PM	Fontana (yellow card) 28'	Report	Dally 58'; Grandison (yellow card) 78'	Stadium: Talen Energy Stadium; Attendance: 433; Referee: Luis Arroyo

March 30 4	Bethlehem Steel FC	2–2	Pittsburgh Riverhounds SC	Chester, Pennsylvania
7:00 PM	Moumbagna 21', (yellow card) 44'; Willis (yellow card) 29'; Ngalinga 36'; Chambers (yellow card) 70'	Report	Kerr 4'; Greenspan 60'; Dover (yellow card) 72'	Stadium: Talen Energy Stadium; Attendance: 480; Referee: Jose Lara

April 6 5	Swope Park Rangers	3–4	Bethlehem Steel FC	Kansas City, Kansas
4:00 PM	Vanacore-Decker 19'; Mbekeli 44', 57'; Riley (yellow card) 49'; Segbers (yellow card) 70'	Report	Rayyan (yellow card) 24'; Moumbagna 27'; Fontana (yellow card) 64'; Real (yellow card) 68' (yellow-red card) 90+1'; Ofeimu 73'; Segbers 76' (o.g.); Santos 90+3'	Stadium: Children's Mercy Park; Attendance: 486; Referee: Mike Lavergne

April 13 6	Bethlehem Steel FC	3–1	Charleston Battery	Chester, Pennsylvania
7:30 PM	Ofeimu (yellow card) 31'; Przybyłko 44', 70'; Fabinho 67' (yellow card) 81'; Turner (yellow card) 90+1'	Report	Kelly-Rosales (yellow card) 42'; Anunga 69'	Stadium: Talen Energy Stadium; Attendance: 1,003; Referee: Yusri Rudolf

April 16 7	Charlotte Independence	2–1	Bethlehem Steel FC	Matthews, North Carolina
6:00 PM	Gutman 29', (yellow card) 66'; Herrera 72'	Report	Turner (yellow card) 57'; Willis 80'; Real (yellow card) 84'; Ofeimu (yellow card) 85'	Stadium: Matthews Sportsplex; Attendance: 1,387; Referee: Elvis Osmanovic

April 20 8	Bethlehem Steel FC	0–3	Indy Eleven	Chester, Pennsylvania
4:00 PM EDT	Ofeimu (yellow card) 53'; Moumbagna (yellow card) 80'	Report	Hackshaw 26'; Kelly 28'; Pasher 73'	Stadium: Talen Energy Stadium; Attendance: 1,537; Referee: Jon Freemon

May 3 9	Loudoun United FC	3–3	Bethlehem Steel FC	Washington, District of Columbia
6:30 PM	Murphy 37', 49'; Verfurth (yellow card) 59'; Sinclair 90+3'	Report	Ngalina 31', 32'; Moumbagna 60' (pen.)	Stadium: Audi Field; Attendance: 824; Referee: Mark Allatin

May 12 10	Bethlehem Steel FC	1–1	Atlanta United 2	Chester, Pennsylvania
6:00 PM	Chambers (yellow card) 20'; Topey 64'; Cortés (yellow card) 83'	Report	Wyke 11', (yellow card) 90'; Asiedu (yellow card) 59'; Hernández (yellow card) 72'; Vint (yellow card) 81'	Stadium: Talen Energy Stadium; Attendance: 222; Referee: Lorant Varga

May 19 11	Bethlehem Steel FC	0–3	Ottawa Fury FC	Chester, Pennsylvania
18:00 EST (UTC–5)	Fabinho (yellow card) 14'	Report	François 32'; Fall 57'; Samb 82'	Stadium: Talen Energy Stadium; Attendance: 436; Referee: Sergii Demianchuk

May 25 12	Bethlehem Steel FC	2–2	Louisville City FC	Chester, Pennsylvania
7:00 PM EDT	Mbaizo (yellow card) 31'; Moumbagna (red card) 37'; Willis 51' (pen.), 57'; Topey (yellow card) 87'; Ofeimu (yellow card) 89' (yellow-red card) 90+2'	Report	Spencer 26'; Craig (yellow card) 30'; Matsoso (red card) 37'; Mkosana 46'; Rasmussen (yellow card) 56'; Thiam (yellow card) 87'	Stadium: Talen Energy Stadium; Attendance: 219; Referee: Kevin Broadley

May 31 13	New York Red Bulls II	4–0	Bethlehem Steel FC	Montclair, New Jersey
7:00 PM EDT	Zajec 26', 31'; Jørgenson 65' (pen.); Scarlett (yellow card) 69'; Cortés 76' (o.g.)	Report	Chambers (yellow card) 24'; Topey (yellow card) 84'	Stadium: MSU Soccer Park at Pittser Field; Attendance: 869; Referee: Elton García

June 9 14	Bethlehem Steel FC	1–4	Nashville SC	Philadelphia, Pennsylvania
6:00 PM EDT	Chambers 24', (yellow card) 49'; Cortés (yellow card) 42'	Report	Bourgeois (yellow card) 23'; Tribbett 27'; LaGrassa (yellow card) 41'; Mensah 63', (yellow card) 80'; Kimura 70'; Lancaster 83'	Stadium: McCarthy Stadium; Attendance: 417; Referee: Thomas Snyder
Note: Match moved from Talen Energy Stadium.

June 15 15	Bethlehem Steel FC	3–1	Saint Louis FC	Philadelphia, Pennsylvania
8:00 PM EDT	Chambers 19', (yellow card) 26'; Moumbagna 25', (red card) 27'; Cortés 37'; Fontana (yellow card) 56'	Report	Kamdem (yellow card) 18'; Hilton (yellow card) 58'; Umar (yellow card) 63' (yellow-red card) 81'; Greig (yellow card) 74'; Calvert (yellow card) 74'; Dacres 85'	Stadium: McCarthy Stadium; Attendance: 222; Referee: Luis Guardia

June 22 16	Bethlehem Steel FC	1–2	Tampa Bay Rowdies	Chester, Pennsylvania
7:00 PM EDT	Chambers (yellow card) 29', (goal) 90+1' (pen.); Turner (yellow card) 50'; Borgelin (yellow card) 54'; Fontana (yellow card) 57'	Report	Tejada 13'; Guenzatti 34'	Stadium: Talen Energy Stadium; Attendance: 505; Referee: David Barrie

June 28 17	Hartford Athletic	0–3	Bethlehem Steel FC	East Hartford, Connecticut
7:30 PM EDT	Lyngø (yellow card) 90+4'	Report	Moumbagna 17', (yellow card) 52'; Rayyan 37'; Harriel (yellow card) 55'; Borgelin (yellow card) 90'; Cortes 90+1'	Stadium: Rentschler Field; Attendance: 5,012; Referee: Lukasz Szpala

July 4 18	Pittsburgh Riverhounds SC	1–0	Bethlehem Steel FC	Pittsburgh, Pennsylvania
7:00 PM EDT	Rovira (yellow card) 53'; Forbes 57'; Adewole (yellow card) 74'; Greenspan (yellow card) 90'	Report	Real (yellow card) 36'; Willis (yellow card) 49'; Chambers (yellow card) 72'	Stadium: Highmark Stadium; Referee: Malik Badawi

July 10 19	Bethlehem Steel FC	3–4	New York Red Bulls II	Chester, Pennsylvania
7:00 PM EDT	Moumbagna 23'; Willis (yellow card) 43'; Real (yellow card) 45'; Fontana (yellow card) 45+2'; Rayyan 46', 58'; Turner (yellow card) 90'	Report	Barlow 15', 82'; Koffi (yellow card) 61'; Stroud 76', 88'	Stadium: Talen Energy Stadium; Attendance: 256; Referee: Eric Tattersall

July 20 20	Louisville City FC	0–1	Bethlehem Steel FC	Louisville, Kentucky
7:00 PM EDT	Craig (yellow card) 45'	Report	Cortes 26', (yellow card) 85'; Real (yellow card) 90+3'	Stadium: Louisville Slugger Field; Attendance: 8,965; Referee: Guido Gonzales Jr.

July 27 21	Saint Louis FC	3–0	Bethlehem Steel FC	Fenton, Missouri
8:30 PM	Umar (yellow card) 29'; Greig 41'; Hilton 48'; Dacres 49'	Report	Willis (yellow card) 56'; McKenzie (yellow card) 78'	Stadium: Toyota Stadium; Attendance: 4,225; Referee: Matthew Thompson

August 1 22	Bethlehem Steel FC	0–3	Hartford Athletic	Chester, Pennsylvania
5:00 PM	Mbaizo (yellow card) 31'; Ofeimu (yellow card) 38' (yellow-red card) 76'; Zandi (yellow card) 63'; Turner (yellow card) 67'	Report	Due (yellow card) 23'; Curinga (yellow card) 24'; Bedoya 28'; Dixon 50'; Wojcik 84'	Stadium: Talen Energy Stadium; Attendance: 325; Referee: Danielle Chesky

August 10 23	Nashville SC	0–0	Bethlehem Steel FC	Nashville, Tennessee
8:00 PM EDT		Report	Chambers (yellow card) 90+4'	Stadium: First Tennessee Park; Attendance: 7,762; Referee: Sergii Demianchuk

August 25 24	Bethlehem Steel FC	2–3	Birmingham Legion FC	Chester, Pennsylvania
5:00 PM CDT	Zandi (yellow card) 42'; Santos (red card) 42'; Real (yellow card) 53'; Turner (yellow card) 56'; Ngalina 69'; Mbaizo 74' (pen.); Moumbagna (red card) 77'	Report	Kasim 20'; Lopez (yellow card) 36', (goal) 76'; Herivaux (red card) 42'; Avila (yellow card) 54'; JJ Williams 67'; Cromwell (yellow card) 73' (yellow-red card) 83'	Stadium: Talen Energy Stadium; Attendance: 357; Referee: Elijio Arreguin

September 1 25	Bethlehem Steel FC	2–0	Swope Park Rangers	Bethlehem, Pennsylvania
6:00 PM	Ngalina (yellow card) 33', (goal) 36'; Topey (yellow card) 39' (yellow-red card) 84'; Zandi 75'	Report	Hernandez (yellow card) 14'; Allach (yellow card) 34'; Clarke (yellow card) 82'	Stadium: Talen Energy Stadium; Attendance: 329; Referee: Eric Tattersall

September 7 26	North Carolina FC	3–3	Bethlehem Steel FC	Cary, North Carolina
19:00 EDT	da Luz 9'; Brotherton (yellow card) 16'; Kristo 20', 47', (yellow card) 48'; Wapiwo (yellow card) 85'	Report	Scintu 45'; Chambers 60'; Borgelin 84'	Stadium: Sahlen's Stadium at WakeMed Soccer Park; Attendance: 3,457; Referee: Jonathan Bilinski

September 14 27	Indy Eleven	2–1	Bethlehem Steel FC	Indianapolis, Indiana
7:00 PM EDT	Ilić 57'; Ouimette (yellow card) 66'; Kelly 80', (yellow card) 88'; King (yellow card) 89'	Report	Scintu (yellow card) 27'; Zandi (yellow card) 73'; Ofeimu 75', (yellow card) 90+2'; Freese (yellow card) 80'	Stadium: Lucas Oil Stadium; Attendance: 12,103; Referee: Kevin Broadley

September 18 28	Bethlehem Steel FC	5–2	Loudoun United FC	Bethlehem, Pennsylvania
7:30 PM	Chambers 35', (yellow card) 84'; Zandi 47'; Rayyan 49'; Ngalina (yellow card) 58', (goal) 80'; Picazo 90+1' (pen.)	Report	Wild 2'; Murphy 45'; Alvarez (red card) 90'	Stadium: Talen Energy Stadium; Attendance: 298; Referee: Daniel Gutierrez

September 21 29	Tampa Bay Rowdies	6–1	Bethlehem Steel FC	St. Petersburg, Florida
7:30 EST (UTC−5)	Ofeimu 20' (o.g.); Guenzatti 24'; Poku 40'; Morad (yellow card) 42'; Tinari 45+2'; Mkosana 71', (yellow card) 74'; Taku 90+2'	Report	Cortés (yellow card) 54'; Willis (yellow card) 65'; Faris 69' (pen.)	Stadium: Al Lang Stadium; Attendance: 5,513; Referee: Elvis Osmanovic

September 28 30	Memphis 901 FC	5–0	Bethlehem Steel FC	Memphis, Tennessee
7:00 PM	Collier 7'; Epps 15'; Allen 29', 36'; Doyle 50'; Muckette (yellow card) 83'	Report	Turner (yellow card) 47'; Picazo (yellow card) 76'; Ofeimu (yellow card) 89'	Stadium: Autozone Park; Attendance: 6,078; Referee: Alejandro Mariscal

October 6 31	Bethlehem Steel FC	1–2	Charlotte Independence	Bethlehem, Pennsylvania
7:30 PM	Moumbagna 14'; Chambers (yellow card) 31'; Picazo (yellow card) 69'; Kingue (yellow card) 82'	Report	Maund 6'; Roberts (yellow card) 12', (goal) 67'; A. Martínez (red card) 31'; Mansally (yellow card) 72'	Stadium: Talen Energy Stadium; Attendance: 351; Referee: Matthew Franz

October 9 32	Atlanta United 2	5–2	Bethlehem Steel FC	Kennesaw, Georgia
7:30 PM	Decas (yellow card) 13'; Campbell (yellow card) 29', (goal) 38'; Ambrose 43'; Castanheira (yellow card) 47'; Okonkwo 57'; Adams (yellow card) 58'; Bello 61' (pen.); Kanakimana 87' (pen.); Fernando (yellow card) 90+2'	Report	Ofeimu (yellow card) 36'; Moumbagna 48' (pen.); Miscic 77'; Morton (yellow card) 87'; Turner (yellow card) 89'	Stadium: Fifth Third Bank Stadium; Attendance: 1,702; Referee: Malik Badawi

October 12 33	Ottawa Fury FC	1–1	Bethlehem Steel FC	Ottawa, Ontario
2:00 PM	Haworth 40'; Ward (yellow card) 90+7'	Report	Kingue (yellow card) 43'; Moumbagna 71'; Zandi (yellow card) 78'	Stadium: TD Place Stadium; Attendance: 5,539; Referee: Myriam Marcotte

October 19 34	Charleston Battery	5–1	Bethlehem Steel FC	Charleston, South Carolina
2:00 PM	Bosua 23', 67'; Kelly-Rosales (yellow card) 27'; Higashi (yellow card) 71'; Guerra 74' (pen.); Paterson 81', 84'; Mueller (yellow card) 90+1'	Report	Chambers (yellow card) 21'; Harriel (yellow card) 39'; Cortés (yellow card) 58'; Moumbagna 78'	Stadium: MUSC Health Stadium; Attendance: 3,300; Referee: Jonathan Bilinski

=== U.S. Open Cup ===
Due to their affiliation with a higher division professional club (Philadelphia Union), Steel FC was one of 13 teams expressly forbidden from entering the Cup competition.

== Statistics ==
As of August 19, 2020

No.	Pos	Nat	Player	Total		USLC		USLC Playoffs	
No.	Pos	Nat	Player	Apps	Goals	Apps	Goals	Apps	Goals
Defenders:
4	DF	(United States) USA	Mark McKenzie	6	0	6	0	0	0
15	DF	(Cameroon) CMR	Olivier Mbaizo	9	1	9	1	0	0
32	DF	(United States) USA	Matthew Real	18	0	18	0	0	0
33	DF	(Brazil) BRA	Fabinho	2	1	2	1	0	0
42	DF	(Jamaica) JAM	Jamoi Topey*	9	1	9	1	0	0
43	DF	(Cameroon) CMR	Steve Kingue*	14	0	9+5	0	0	0
44	DF	(United States) USA	Ben Ofeimu	27	2	26+1	2	0	0
47	DF	(Costa Rica) CRC	Walter Cortes*	27	3	23+4	3	0	0
60	DF	(United States) USA	Nathan Harriel‡	23	0	20+3	0	0	0
61	DF	(United States) USA	Dante Huckaby‡	3	0	0+3	0	0	0
68	DF	(United States) USA	Michael Pellegrino‡	1	0	1	0	0	0
Midfielders:
8	MF	(United States) USA	Derrick Jones	3	0	3	0	0	0
21	MF	(United States) USA	Anthony Fontana	14	0	14	0	0	0
37	MF	(United States) USA	Selmir Miscic	5	1	2+3	1	0	0
38	MF	(United States) USA	Zach Zandi	30	3	27+3	3	0	0
39	MF	(Jamaica) JAM	Chavany Willis*	27	3	24+3	3	0	0
40	MF	(United States) USA	Issa Rayyan	26	4	25+1	4	0	0
45	MF	(Republic of Ireland) IRL	James Chambers	32	5	27+5	5	0	0
46	MF	(Democratic Republic of the Congo) COD	Michee Ngalina	22	6	22	6	0	0
51	MF	(United States) USA	Cole Turner‡	25	0	22+3	0	0	0
55	MF	(United States) USA	Jack de Vries‡	3	0	2+1	0	0	0
56	MF	(United States) USA	Luis Flores‡	4	0	1+3	0	0	0
59	MF	(United States) USA	Axel Picazo‡	19	1	7+12	1	0	0
63	MF	(Haiti) HAI	Shanyder Borgelin	24	1	7+17	1	0	0
Forwards:
17	FW	(Brazil) BRA	Sergio Santos	2	1	1+1	1	0	0
23	FW	(Poland) POL	Kacper Przybylko	2	3	2	3	0	0
35	FW	(Cameroon) CMR	Faris Pemi Moumbagna	25	11	21+4	11	0	0
36	FW	(Panama) PAN	Saed Díaz*	9	0	3+6	0	0	0
41	FW	(Italy) ITA	Yomi Scintu	10	1	5+5	1	0	0
57	FW	(United States) USA	Anges Bohui‡	8	0	2+6	0	0	0

Players with names in italics were on loan from Philadelphia Union for individual matches with Bethlehem.
Players with names marked ‡ were academy call-ups from Philadelphia Union Academy for individual matches with Bethlehem.
Players with names marked * were on loan from another club for the whole of their season with Bethlehem.

=== Goalkeepers ===
As of April 20, 2019.

Players included in matchday squads
Nat.	No.	Player	Apps	Starts	Record	GA	GAA	SO	Yellow card	Red card
(United States)	1	Matt Freese	3	3	2-1-0	4	1.33	1	0	0
(Brazil)	31	Carlos Miguel Coronel	4	4	1-2-1	6	1.50	0	0	0
(United States)	64	Tomas Romero‡	0	0	0-0-0	0	0.00	0	0	0
Total					3-3-1	10	1.42	1	0	0

== Honors ==
=== Team of the Week ===
- Week 1 Team of the Week: M Zach Zandi
- Week 2 Team of the Week Bench: G Carlos Miguel Coronel
- Week 5 Team of the Week: D Ben Ofeimu
- Week 6 Team of the Week: F Kacper Przybylko
