= 2020 Loudoun United FC season =

Loudoun United FC
2020 season
- Head coach: Ryan Martin
- Stadium: Segra Field
- USL Championship: Group F: 5th Eastern Conf.: 17th
- USL Playoffs: Did not qualify
- Top goalscorer: Elvis Amoh (4)
- Highest home attendance: 520 (Sep 12 vs. PHI)
- Lowest home attendance: 452 (Aug 19 vs. PIT)
- Average home league attendance: 495
- Biggest win: NY 1–2 LDN (Aug. 12)
- Biggest defeat: PHI 4–0 LDN (Sept. 16)

The 2020 Loudoun United FC season was Loudoun United FC's second season of existence, their second in the second-division of American soccer, and their 2nd in the USL Championship. The team only played one competitive match before the USL Championship suspended all league matches due to the COVID-19 pandemic until further notice.

On July 11, the league resumed play in a radically different format: all USLC teams were sorted into regional Groups for a round-robin style tournament, where the top two teams from each Group would earn a playoff spot. Loudoun United was drawn into Group F with other teams from the Northeastern US, and would resume play on July 20 against Hartford Athletic.

On September 25, Loudoun United announced that some of their team members had tested positive for COVID-19, and that they would cancel the rest of the season. The team's poor performance resulted in only one win throughout the entire season and mathematical elimination from competing for the USL Championship Final.

== Club ==
=== Roster ===
As of September 25, 2020

No.	Position	Nation	Player
0	GK	USA	Colin Miller
5	DF	USA	Shane Wiedt
6	MF	TAN	Ally Hamis Ng’anzi
7	FW	GHA	Elvis Amoh
9	FW	SEN	Alioune Ndour
10	FW	USA	Michael Gamble
12	FW	NIG	Kairou Amoustapha
13	MF	ARG	Gabriel Gómez
14	DF	USA	Nelson Martinez
16	FW	CAN	Massimo Ferrin
17	MF	USA	Ted Ku-DiPietro
18	GK	USA	Lorenzo Gordon
19	MF	USA	Brandon Williamson
20	DF	SLV	Allexon Saravia
21	FW	USA	Josh Fawole
22	DF	USA	Robby Dambrot
23	FW	USA	Christian Sorto
24	DF	USA	Jeremy Garay
25	DF	USA	Jake Dengler
27	DF	USA	EruMuse Momoh
28	MF	USA	Tyler Gabarra
29	DF	USA	Timothy Mehl
30	MF	USA	Sebastian Falsone
33	MF	USA	Jacob Greene
36	DF	USA	Adam Lundegard
37	FW	USA	Juston Rainey
38	DF	USA	Liam Moore
40	GK	FRA	Simon Lefebvre

Signed to first team contract with D.C. United.
D.C. United Academy player.

== Competitions ==
=== Exhibitions ===
February 15	Loudoun United FC	–	Richmond Kickers	Leesburg, Virginia
12:00 PM EST				Stadium: Segra Field
Note: Match not reported.

February 22	North Carolina FC	v	Loudoun United FC	Cary, NC
1:00 PM EST				Stadium: WakeMed Soccer Park
Note: Match was cancelled on February 21 announced by North Carolina FC.

February 26	Pittsburgh Riverhounds SC	1–1	Loudoun United FC	Pittsburgh, PA
12:00 PM EST	Fernandes 24' (Mertz)	Report	70' (pen.)	Stadium: Highmark Stadium

=== USL Championship ===
March 7 1	Philadelphia Union II	0–0	Loudoun United FC	Chester, Pennsylvania
7:30 PM EST	Turner (yellow card) 59'; Ofeimu (yellow card) 85'; Huckaby (yellow card) 87'	Report	Saravia (yellow card) 45+3'	Stadium: Subaru Park; Attendance: 467; Referee: Thomas Snyder

July 20 2	Hartford Athletic	3–1	Loudoun United FC	Hartford, Connecticut
7:00 PM EDT	Politz 3'; Swartz 45'; Johnson 55'; Dixon (yellow card) 65'	Report	Amoh (yellow card) 43', (goal) 58' (pen.); Doue (yellow card) 90'	Stadium: Dillon Stadium; Referee: Adam Kilpatrick

August 2 3	Hartford Athletic	4–1	Loudoun United FC	Hartford, Connecticut
7:00 PM EDT	Guzmán 7', 18'; Lara (yellow card) 45'; Barrera 66'; Dixon (yellow card) 84'; Torres (yellow card) 90+3'; Vazquez Villar 90+8'	Report	Amoh 21' (pen.), (yellow card) 56'	Stadium: Dillon Stadium; Referee: Jeremy Scheer

August 12 4	New York Red Bulls II	1–2	Loudoun United FC	Harrison, New Jersey
7:00 PM EDT	Lapsley (red card) 15'; Kilwien 79', (yellow card) 90+5'; Rito (yellow card) 90+1'	Report	Ku-DiPietro 45+4'; Amoh (yellow card) 60', (goal) 65' (pen.); Mehl (yellow card) 80'; Doue (yellow card) 85'	Stadium: Red Bull Arena; Referee: Jeremy Scheer

August 15 5	Louisville City FC	2–0	Loudoun United FC	Louisville, Kentucky
7:00 PM EDT	Lancaster 39'; McMahon (yellow card) 45+4'; Matsoso 49'	Report	Gabarra (yellow card) 17'; Amoh (yellow card) 24'; Garay (yellow card) 48'; Amoustapha (yellow card) 67'; Williamson (yellow card) 68'	Stadium: Lynn Family Stadium; Attendance: 4,850; Referee: Eric Tattersall

August 19 6	Loudoun United FC	0–2	Pittsburgh Riverhounds SC	Leesburg, Virginia
7:00 PM EDT	Martinez (yellow card) 17' (yellow-red card) 45+1'; Wiedt (yellow card) 58'; Saravia (yellow card) 59'	Report	Dos Santos 7'; Fernandes 11'; Barnathan (yellow card) 50'; Vancaeyezeele (yellow card) 85'	Stadium: Segra Field; Attendance: 452; Referee: Matthew Franz

August 23 7	Hartford Athletic	2–2	Loudoun United FC	Hartford, Connecticut
7:00 PM EDT	Swartz (yellow card) 28'; Barrera (yellow card) 67'; Silva (yellow card) 69'; Naglestad 85'; Dixon 89'	Report	Wiedt 22'; Ndour (yellow card) 23'; Amoustapha (yellow card) 44'; Amoh 73', (yellow card) 84'; Greene (yellow card) 88'	Stadium: Dillon Stadium; Referee: Thomas Snyder

August 29 8	Loudoun United FC	2–3	New York Red Bulls II	Leesburg, Virginia
7:00 PM EDT	Amoustapha 40', 64'; Wiedt (yellow card) 90+6'	Report	LaCava 19', 45+5'; Boateng (yellow card) 22'; Dieye (penalty missed) 26'; Clark 56', (yellow card) 69'	Stadium: Segra Field; Attendance: 512; Referee: John Griggs

September 1 9	Pittsburgh Riverhounds SC	3–0	Loudoun United FC	Pittsburgh, Pennsylvania
7:00 PM EDT	Forrest 5' (pen.); Velarde 8' (pen.); Dikwa (yellow card) 66', (goal) 88'	Report	Fawole (penalty missed) 17'; Amoh (yellow card) 38'; Ndour (yellow card) 55'; Williamson (yellow card) 71'	Stadium: Highmark Stadium; Referee: Joshua Encarnación

September 5 10	Hartford Athletic	2–1	Loudoun United FC	Hartford, Connecticut
7:00 PM EDT	Silva (yellow card) 6'; Rogers 17', (yellow card) 56'; Strong (yellow card) 43'; Guzmán (yellow card) 70'; Torres 76'	Report	Fawole 4'; Ndour (yellow card) 30'; Mehl (yellow card) 77' (yellow-red card) 87'	Stadium: Dillon Stadium; Attendance: 1,375; Referee: Christian Centeno

September 12 11	Loudoun United FC	1–1	Philadelphia Union II	Leesburg, Virginia
7:00 PM EDT	Lundegard (yellow card) 8' (yellow-red card) 13'; Amoustapha 42'; Gabarra (yellow card) 51'; Ku-DiPietro (yellow card) 90+2'; Gamble (red card) 90+4'	Report	Bohui 10'; Kingue (yellow card) 29'	Stadium: Segra Field; Attendance: 520; Referee: Danielle Chesky

September 16 12	Philadelphia Union II	4–0	Loudoun United FC	Chester, Pennsylvania
7:00 PM EDT	Craig 6'; Sorenson 20', (yellow card) 90+3'; Kingue 32'; Huckaby (yellow card) 71'; Stafford 83', (yellow card) 87'	Report	Ndour (yellow card) 29'; Amoustapha (yellow card) 40'; Saravia (yellow card) 90+3'	Stadium: Subaru Park; Referee: Ernie Constantine

September 19 13	Loudoun United FC	0–1	Pittsburgh Riverhounds SC	Leesburg, Virginia
6:30 PM EDT	Fawole (yellow card) 37'; Saravia (yellow card) 45+4' (yellow-red card) 90+4'	Report	Vancaeyezeele (yellow card) 51'; Dikwa 81'; Walls (yellow card) 90+2'	Stadium: Segra Field; Attendance: 494; Referee: John Griggs

September 26 14	Charleston Battery	Cancelled	Loudoun United FC	Mount Pleasant, South Carolina
7:00 PM EDT				Stadium: Patriots Point Soccer Complex
Note: Match cancelled due to positive COVID-19 tests in Loudoun United FC

September 30 15	Loudoun United FC	Cancelled	New York Red Bulls II	Leesburg, Virginia
7:00 PM EDT				Stadium: Segra Field
Note: Match cancelled due to positive COVID-19 tests in Loudoun United FC

October 4 16	Loudoun United FC	Cancelled	North Carolina FC	Leesburg, Virginia
7:00 PM EDT				Stadium: Segra Field
Note: Match cancelled due to positive COVID-19 tests in Loudoun United FC

==== Original Standings ====
Pos	Team	Pld	W	L	T	GF	GA	GD	Pts	PPG
13	Miami FC	16	4	8	4	20	34	−14	16	1.00
14	New York Red Bulls II	16	5	11	0	30	37	−7	15	0.94
15	Atlanta United 2	16	3	10	3	23	33	−10	12	0.75
16	Philadelphia Union II	16	2	11	3	20	45	−25	9	0.56
17	Loudoun United FC	13	1	9	3	10	28	−18	6	0.46

Source: USL Championship
Rules for classification: 1) points per game; 2) points; 3) total wins; 4) total goal differential; 5) total goals scored; 6) disciplinary points; 7) coin toss or drawing of lots.

==== Group F Table ====
The standings for the Group include the results of any games that were played before the season was suspended.

Pos	Team	Pld	W	D	L	GF	GA	GD	Pts	PPG	Qualification
1	Hartford Athletic	16	11	2	3	31	24	+7	35	2.19	Advance to USL Championship Playoffs
2	Pittsburgh Riverhounds SC	16	11	1	4	39	10	+29	34	2.13	Advance to USL Championship Playoffs
3	New York Red Bulls II	16	5	0	11	30	37	−7	15	0.94	
4	Philadelphia Union II	16	2	3	11	20	45	−25	9	0.56	
5	Loudoun United FC	13	1	3	9	10	28	−18	6	0.46	

Source: USL

=== U.S. Open Cup ===
Due to their ownership by a higher division professional club (D.C. United), LUFC is one of 15 teams expressly forbidden from entering the Cup competition.
