= 2020 Louisville City FC season =

Louisville City
2020 season
- Owner: John Neace
- Manager: John Hackworth
- Stadium: Lynn Family Stadium
- USL: Eastern Conf.: 1st Group E: 1st
- USL Playoffs: Conf. Finals
- U.S. Open Cup: Cancelled
- Top goalscorer: League: Cameron Lancaster (10 goals); All: Cameron Lancaster (12 goals)
- Highest home attendance: 4,900 (October 3 vs. Sporting Kansas City II) (October 17 vs. Saint Louis FC) (October 24 vs. Tampa Bay Rowdies)
- Lowest home attendance: 4,850 (Eight times)
- Average home league attendance: 4,862
- Biggest win: LOU 4–1 SKC (Aug. 19); LOU 3–0 STL (Sept. 12); LOU 4–1 MEM (Sept. 19)
- Biggest defeat: LOU 1–3 PIT (July 12)
Home colors	Away colors	Third colors

The 2020 Louisville City FC season was the club's sixth season in Louisville, Kentucky playing in the United Soccer League Championship (USLC), which as of 2020 is the second-tier league in the United States soccer league system. This article covers the period from November 18, 2019, the day after the 2019 USLC Playoff Final, to the conclusion of the 2020 USLC Playoff Final, scheduled for November 12–16, 2020.

== Current squad ==
As of March 5, 2020

No.	Position	Nation	Player
1	GK	USA	Chris Hubbard
3	DF	FRA	Alexis Souahy
4	DF	USA	Sean Totsch
5	DF	USA	Jimmy Ockford
6	DF	USA	Wesley Charpie
7	MF	DEN	Magnus Rasmussen
8	DF	USA	Akil Watts
9	FW	GER	Luke Spencer
10	MF	USA	Brian Ownby
11	MF	IRL	Niall McCabe
13	MF	USA	Corben Bone
14	FW	SEN	Abdou Mbacke Thiam
15	DF	USA	Pat McMahon
17	FW	ENG	Cameron Lancaster (on loan from Nashville SC)
19	MF	USA	Oscar Jimenez
22	MF	USA	George Davis IV
27	MF	LES	Napo Matsoso
29	MF	FRA	Antoine Hoppenot
36	MF	USA	Paolo DelPiccolo
39	GK	GER	Ben Lundt (on loan from FC Cincinnati)
61	MF	USA	Elijah Wynder
80	MF	JAM	Devon Williams
91	GK	USA	Muamer Ugarak
—	DF	USA	Jonathan Gómez

USL Academy Contract

== Competitions ==
=== Exhibitions ===
February 6 Preseason 1	D.C. United	1–0	Louisville City FC	Clearwater, Florida
4:00 PM EST	Gamble 70'	Report	McCabe (yellow card) 57'	Stadium: Joe DiMaggio Sports Complex

February 9 Preseason 2	Nashville SC	4–1	Louisville City FC	Bradenton, Florida
4:00 PM EST	Leal 3'; Ríos 15'; Accam 66' (pen.); Danladi 85'	Report	Thiam 30'	Stadium: IMG Academy

February 16 Preseason 3	Colorado Springs Switchbacks FC	0–3	Louisville City FC	Herriman, Utah
9:00 PM EST		Report	Lancaster 9', 22'; Thiam 90'	Stadium: Zions Bank Stadium

February 19 Preseason 4	Union Omaha	1–1	Louisville City FC	Herriman, Utah
3:00 PM EST	Viader 80' (pen.)	Report	Thiam 38' (pen.)	Stadium: Zions Bank Stadium

February 22 Preseason 5	Real Monarchs	1–3	Louisville City FC	Herriman, Utah
11:00 AM EST	Coffee 34'	Report	Thiam 7'; Lancaster 25'; Ownby 27'	Stadium: Zions Bank Stadium

February 25 Preseason 6	Louisville City FC	4–0	Forward Madison FC	Louisville, Kentucky
3:00 PM EST	Lancaster 9', 11'; DelPiccolo 20'; Thiam 22'	1st Half Report; Final Report		Stadium: Thurman Hutchins Park

February 29 Preseason 7	Kentucky Wildcats	1-2	Louisville City FC	Lexington, Kentucky
5:00 PM EST	El Medkhar 15'	Report	Lancaster 80'; McCabe 87'	Stadium: Bell Soccer Complex

=== USL Championship ===
==== Standings — Group E ====
Pos	Team	Pld	W	D	L	GF	GA	GD	Pts	PPG	Qualification
1	Louisville City FC	16	11	2	3	28	12	+16	35	2.19	Advance to USL Championship Playoffs
2	Saint Louis FC	16	7	4	5	22	21	+1	25	1.56	Advance to USL Championship Playoffs
3	Indy Eleven	16	7	2	7	21	19	+2	23	1.44	
4	Sporting Kansas City II	16	5	1	10	21	30	−9	16	1.00	

Source: USL

==== Results summary ====
Overall								Home						Away					
Pld	W	D	L	GF	GA	GD	Pts	W	D	L	GF	GA	GD	W	D	L	GF	GA	GD
16	11	2	3	28	12	+16	35	7	1	3	20	10	+10	4	1	0	8	2	+6

Last updated: October 5, 2020.
Source: Match reports

Round	1	2	3	4	5	6	7	8	9	10	11	12	13	14	15	16
Stadium	A	H	H	H	H	H	H	H	H	A	A	H	A	H	A	H
Result	W	L	L	W	L	D	W	W	W	D	W	W	W	W	W	W

Updated to match(es) played on October 5, 2020. Source: Match reports
A = Away; H = Home; W = Win; D = Draw; L = Loss

==== Match results ====
On December 20, 2019, the USL announced the 2020 season schedule, creating the following fixture list for the early part of Louisville City's season.

March 7 1	North Carolina FC	0–1	Louisville City FC	Cary, North Carolina
TBD PM EST	Kristo (yellow card) 88'; Taylor (yellow card) 90+3'	Report	Lancaster 63'	Stadium: Sahlen's Stadium at WakeMed Soccer Park; Attendance: 3,515; Referee: Adam Kilpatrick; Assistant referees: Ryan Graves; Jordan Davis; Fourth official: William Steffen

In the preparations for the resumption of league play following the shutdown prompted by the COVID-19 pandemic, Louisville City's schedule was announced on July 2.

July 12 2	Louisville City FC	1–3	Pittsburgh Riverhounds SC	Louisville, Kentucky
5:00 PM EDT	Williams 18'	Report	Ashworth (yellow card) 27'; Dover 45'; Mertz 46'; Velarde 51'; Barnathan (yellow card) 90'	Stadium: Lynn Family Stadium; Attendance: 4,850; Referee: Eric Tattersall; Assistant referees: Jeffrey Swartzel; Chris Schurfranz; Fourth official: Youssef Elmessoussi

July 18 3	Louisville City FC	0–1	Saint Louis FC	Louisville, Kentucky
8:00 PM EDT	Williams (yellow card) 49'; Ownby (yellow card) 90+4'	Report	Gee (yellow card) 41'; Blackwood 52'; Wharton (yellow card) 73'	Stadium: Lynn Family Stadium; Attendance: 4,850; Referee: Youssef Elmessoussi; Assistant referees: Chris Schurfranz; Jeffrey Swartzel; Fourth official: Joshua Few

July 25 4	Louisville City FC	1–0	Sporting Kansas City II	Louisville, Kentucky
8:00 PM EDT	Matsoso (yellow card) 19'; Lancaster 50'; Jimenez (yellow card) 67'	Report	Duke (yellow card) 32'; Rad (yellow card) 87'	Stadium: Lynn Family Stadium; Attendance: 4,850; Referee: Nabil Bensalah; Assistant referees: Chris Schurfranz; Christopher Slane; Fourth official: Josh Few

July 29 5	Louisville City FC	1–2	Sporting Kansas City II	Louisville, Kentucky
8:00 PM EDT	Lancaster 21'; Ockford (yellow card) 36'; Totsch (yellow card) 90+4'	Report	Rešetar 8', (yellow card) 61'; Harris 83'	Stadium: Lynn Family Stadium; Attendance: 4,850; Referee: Joshua Few; Assistant referees: Walt Heatherly; Chris Schurfranz; Fourth official: Nabil Bensalah

August 8 6	Louisville City FC	1–1	Indy Eleven	Louisville, Kentucky
8:00 PM EDT	Williams 3', (yellow card) 77'	Report	Hackshaw (yellow card) 43'; Barrett (yellow card) 55'; Pasher 59'	Stadium: Lynn Family Stadium; Attendance: 4,850; Referee: Calin Radosav; Assistant referees: Art Arustamyan; Chris Schurfranz; Fourth official: Nabil Bensalah

August 12 7	Louisville City FC	P–P	Sporting Kansas City II	Louisville, Kentucky
TBA PM EDT				Stadium: Lynn Family Stadium
Note: Match postponed due to positive covid-19 test in the SKCII organization.

August 15 8	Louisville City FC	2–0	Loudoun United FC	Louisville, Kentucky
8:00 PM EDT	Lancaster 39'; McMahon (yellow card) 45+4'; Matsoso 49'	Report	Gabarra (yellow card) 17'; Amoh (yellow card) 24'; Garay (yellow card) 48'; Amoustapha (yellow card) 67'; Williamson (yellow card) 68'	Stadium: Lynn Family Stadium; Attendance: 4,850; Referee: Eric Tattersall; Assistant referees: Eric Wood; Christopher Slane; Fourth official: Josh Few
Note: Match originally to be played at Segra Field.

August 19 7	Louisville City FC	4–1	Sporting Kansas City II	Louisville, Kentucky
8:00 PM EDT	Lancaster 11'; Bone 29', 36'; Jimenez (yellow card) 38'; Matsoso 53'; Totsch (yellow card) 90+5'	Report	Raben 32'	Stadium: Lynn Family Stadium; Attendance: 4,850; Referee: Youssef Elmessoussi; Assistant referees: Walter Heatherly; Art Arustamyan; Fourth official: Joshua Few
Note: Match originally scheduled to be played on August 12.

August 26 9	Louisville City FC	1–0	Indy Eleven	Louisville, Kentucky
8:00 PM EDT	DelPiccolo 61'	Report	Gibson (yellow card) 37'; Ouimette (yellow card) 75'; Hackshaw (yellow card) 90+7'	Stadium: Lynn Family Stadium; Attendance: 4,851; Referee: Matthew Thompson; Assistant referees: Art Arustamyan; Chris Schurfranz; Fourth official: Nabil Bensalah

August 29 10	Saint Louis FC	1–1	Louisville City FC	Fenton, Missouri
8:00 PM EDT	Samb 64'; Wharton (yellow card) 74'; Umar (yellow card) 90+3'	Report	Totsch 30', (yellow card) 54'; Ockford (yellow card) 90+7'	Stadium: Toyota Stadium; Referee: Ismir Pekmic; Assistant referees: Matthew Rodman; Ryan Cook; Fourth official: Matt Geringer

September 5 11	Indy Eleven	1–3	Louisville City FC	Indianapolis, Indiana
7:00 PM EDT	Ouimette (yellow card) 29'; Pasher 45+6' (pen.)	Report	Williams 23'; Bone 27'; Matsoso 44'; Souahy (yellow card) 45+5'; Totsch (yellow card) 77'	Stadium: Lucas Oil Stadium; Attendance: 6,778; Referee: Elvis Osmanovic; Assistant referees: Jeffrey Swartzel; Christian Little; Fourth official: Nabil Bensalah

September 12 12	Louisville City FC	3–0	Saint Louis FC	Louisville, Kentucky
7:30 PM EDT	Hoppenot 28'; Totsch (yellow card) 39'; Lancaster 44'; Johnson 90+6'	Report	Fischer (yellow card) 90'	Stadium: Lynn Family Stadium; Attendance: 4,852; Referee: Calin Radosav; Assistant referees: Jeffrey Swartzel; Chris Schurfranz; Fourth official: Nabil Bensalah

September 16 13	Indy Eleven	0–2	Louisville City FC	Indianapolis, Indiana
7:30 PM EDT	Ouimette (yellow card) 37'	Report	Lancaster 39'; Bone (yellow card) 66', (goal) 76'; DelPiccolo (yellow card) 66'; Hoppenot (yellow card) 73'; Totsch (yellow card) 79'	Stadium: Lucas Oil Stadium; Attendance: 2,500; Referee: Kevin Fikar; Assistant referees: Art Arustamyan; Jeffrey Swartzel; Fourth official: Michael Samour

September 19 14	Louisville City FC	4–1	Memphis 901 FC	Louisville, Kentucky
6:30 PM EDT	Lancaster 14', 72'; Ownby 24'; Hoppenot (yellow card) 70'; Bone 84'	Report	Jennings 44'	Stadium: Lynn Family Stadium; Attendance: 4,850; Referee: Nabil Bensalah; Assistant referees: Walt Heatherly; Art Arustamyan; Fourth official: Youssef Elmessoussi

September 26 15	Saint Louis FC	0–1	Louisville City FC	Fenton, Missouri
8:00 PM EDT	Fall (yellow card) 67'; Kavita (yellow card) 73'	Report	Ownby (yellow card) 14'; Williams 43'; Souahy (yellow card) 57'	Stadium: Toyota Stadium; Referee: Sergii Demianchuk; Assistant referees: Matt Geringer; Matthew Rodman; Fourth official: Jervis Atagana

October 3 16	Louisville City FC	2–1	Sporting Kansas City II	Louisville, Kentucky
7:30 PM EDT	DelPiccolo 26'; Lancaster 40'; Spencer (yellow card) 89'	Report	Freeman 64'; Pierre (yellow card) 69'; Riley (yellow card) 90+3'	Stadium: Lynn Family Stadium; Attendance: 4,900; Referee: Nabil Bensalah; Assistant referees: Walt Heatherly; Chris Schurfranz; Fourth official: Christopher Slane

==== USL Cup Playoffs ====
Conference Quarterfinals; October 10	Conference Semifinals; October 17
A1	Reno 1868 FC	4
B2	LA Galaxy II	1
A1	Reno 1868 FC	2 (4)
B1	Phoenix Rising FC (p)	2 (5)
B1	Phoenix Rising FC (a.e.t.)	1
A2	Sacramento Republic FC	0
Western Conference
C1	El Paso Locomotive FC (p)	2 (4)
D2	FC Tulsa	2 (2)
C1	El Paso Locomotive FC (p)	1 (5)
C2	New Mexico United	1 (3)
D1	San Antonio FC	0
C2	New Mexico United (a.e.t.)	1
E1	Louisville City FC	2
F2	Pittsburgh Riverhounds	0
E1	Louisville City FC	2
E2	Saint Louis FC	0
F1	Hartford Athletic	0
E2	Saint Louis FC	1
Eastern Conference
G1	Charlotte Independence	1
H2	Charleston Battery (a.e.t.)	2
H2	Charleston Battery	0
H1	Tampa Bay Rowdies	1
H1	Tampa Bay Rowdies	4
G2	Birmingham Legion FC	2

Conference Finals; October 24
B1	Phoenix Rising FC (p)	1 (4)
C1	El Paso Locomotive FC	1 (2)
E1	Louisville City FC	1
H1	Tampa Bay Rowdies	2

USL Championship; Cancelled
B1	Phoenix Rising FC	Ø
H1	Tampa Bay Rowdies	Ø

October 10 Conf. Quarterfinals	Louisville City FC	2–0	Pittsburgh Riverhounds SC	Louisville, Kentucky
7:00 PM EDT	Lancaster 17'; Souahy (yellow card) 26'; Hoppenot (yellow card) 29'; Jimenez (yellow card) 53'; Bone 86'	Report	Thomas (yellow card) 45'	Stadium: Lynn Family Stadium; Attendance: 4,900; Referee: Elton Garcia; Assistant referees: Nicholas Balcer; Ben Rigel; Fourth official: Kevin Fikar

October 17 Conf. Semifinals	Louisville City FC	2–0	Saint Louis FC	Louisville, Kentucky
7:30 PM EDT	Totsch (yellow card) 11'; Lancaster 18'; Williams (yellow card) 20'; Lundt (yellow card) 75'; Adewole 83' (o.g.)	Report	Fall (penalty missed) 12'; Gee (yellow card) 25'; Fink (yellow card) 82'; Samb (yellow card) 90+3'	Stadium: Lynn Family Stadium; Attendance: 4,900; Referee: Lukasz Szpala; Assistant referees: Tom Felice; Tiffini Turpin; Fourth official: Eric Tattersall

October 24 Conf. Finals	Louisville City FC	1–2	Tampa Bay Rowdies	Louisville, Kentucky
7:30 PM EDT	McMahon (yellow card) 27'; Lachowecki 47' (o.g.)	Report	Steinberger 3'; Lasso (yellow card) 29'; Dalgaard (yellow card) 38'; Guenzatti 45+3'; Guillén (yellow card) 83'; Ekra (yellow card) 90+1'	Stadium: Lynn Family Stadium; Attendance: 4,900; Referee: Jon Freemon

=== U.S. Open Cup ===
As a USL Championship club, Louisville will enter the competition in the Second Round, to be played April 7–9.

April 7 2nd Round	Louisville City FC (Kentucky)	cancelled	(Ohio) Cleveland SC or (Tennessee) Nashville United	Louisville, Kentucky
7:00 PM EDT				Stadium: Lynn Family Stadium
Note: Match first postponed due to the COVID-19 pandemic in March 2020 then cancelled the following August.

== Player statistics ==
=== Top scorers ===
Place	Position	Number	Name	USL	U.S. Open Cup	USL Cup	Total
1	FW	17	(England) Cameron Lancaster	10	0	2	12
2	MF	12	(United States) Corben Bone	5	0	1	6
3	MF	80	(Jamaica) Devon Williams	4	0	0	4
4	MF	27	(Lesotho) Napo Matsoso	3	0	0	3
5	MF	36	(United States) Paolo DelPiccolo	2	0	0	2
6	MF	29	(France) Antoine Hoppenot	1	0	0	1
6	FW	10	(United States) Brian Ownby	1	0	0	1
6	DF	4	(United States) Sean Totsch	1	0	0	1
6	MF	77	(Jamaica) Jason Johnson	1	0	0	1
Total				28	0	3	31

=== Assist leaders ===
Place	Position	Number	Name	USL	U.S. Open Cup	USL Cup	Total
1	MF	29	(France) Antoine Hoppenot	6	0	1	7
2	FW	10	(United States) Brian Ownby	4	0	0	4
3	MF	27	(Lesotho) Napo Matsoso	2	0	0	2
3	FW	17	(England) Cameron Lancaster	2	0	0	2
3	MF	19	(United States) Oscar Jimenez	1	0	1	2
6	MF	11	(Republic of Ireland) Niall McCabe	1	0	0	1
6	DF	3	(France) Alexis Souahy	1	0	0	1
6	FW	9	(United States) Luke Spencer	1	0	0	1
6	MF	36	(United States) Paolo DelPiccolo	1	0	0	1
6	DF	4	(United States) Sean Totsch	1	0	0	1
6	MF	77	(Jamaica) Jason Johnson	0	0	1	1
Total				20	0	3	23

=== Clean sheets ===
Place	Position	Number	Name	USL	U.S. Open Cup	USL Cup	Total
1	GK	39	(Germany) Ben Lundt	7	0	2	9
Total				7	0	2	9

=== Disciplinary ===
No.	Pos.	Name	USL		U.S. Open Cup		USL Cup		Total	
No.	Pos.	Name	Yellow card	Red card	Yellow card	Red card	Yellow card	Red card	Yellow card	Red card
4	DF	(United States) Sean Totsch	6	0	0	0	1	0	7	0
3	DF	(France) Alexis Souahy	2	0	0	0	1	0	3	0
29	MF	(France) Antoine Hoppenot	2	0	0	0	1	0	3	0
80	MF	(Jamaica) Devon Williams	2	0	0	0	1	0	3	0
19	MF	(United States) Oscar Jimenez	2	0	0	0	1	0	3	0
10	MF	(United States) Brian Ownby	2	0	0	0	0	0	2	0
5	DF	(United States) Jimmy Ockford	2	0	0	0	0	0	2	0
15	DF	(United States) Pat McMahon	1	0	0	0	1	0	2	0
9	FW	(United States) Luke Spencer	1	0	0	0	0	0	1	0
27	MF	(Lesotho) Napo Matsoso	1	0	0	0	0	0	1	0
36	MF	(United States) Paolo DelPiccolo	1	0	0	0	0	0	1	0
12	DF	(United States) Corben Bone	1	0	0	0	0	0	1	0
39	GK	(Germany) Ben Lundt	0	0	0	0	1	0	1	0
Total			23	0	0	0	6	0	29	0
