= Brandon Williamson =

Brandon Williamson may refer to:

- Brandon Williamson (baseball) (born 1998), American baseball pitcher
- Brandon Williamson (soccer) (born 1998), American soccer player
