= Gabriel Gómez =

Gabriel Gómez may refer to:

== Sportspeople ==
- Gabriel Gómez (footballer, born 1959), Colombian football midfielder
- Gabriel Gómez (footballer, born 1984), Panamanian football midfielder
- Gabriel Gómez (footballer, born 1997), Argentine football midfielder
- Gabriel Gomez (racing driver) (born 2006), Brazilian racing driver
- Gabriel Gómez Román ("Gabri", born 1985), Spanish footballer

== Other people ==
- Gabriel Gómez Michel (1965–2014), Mexican paediatrician, academic and politician
- Gabriel Gómez (musician) (died 2026), Venezuelan rock guitarist
- Gabriel Gomez (poet), 21st-century American poet
- Gabriel Gómez de Sandoval y Arraita (fl. 17th century), Spanish soldier
- Gabriel E. Gomez (born 1965), United States politician, former Navy SEAL
