= Shanyder Borgelin =

Haitian footballer (born 2001)

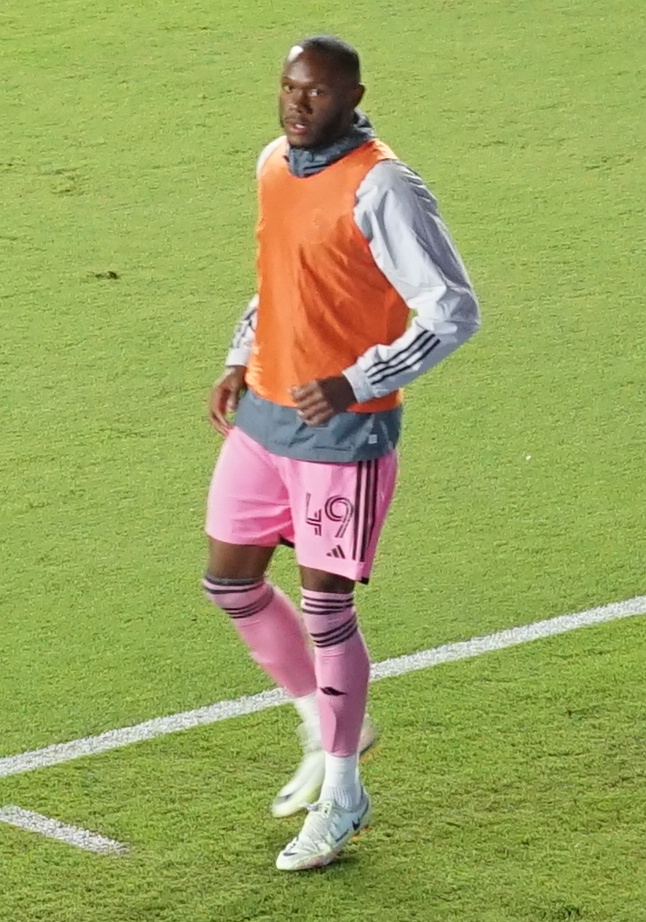
- Borgelin warming up for Inter Miami in 2024

Personal information
- Full name: Shanyder Antonio Borgelin
- Date of birth: 19 October 2001 (age 25)
- Place of birth: Margate, Florida, United States
- Height: 1.96 m (6 ft 5 in)
- Position: Forward

Team information
- Current team: Varbergs BoIS
- Number: 49

Youth career
- 2012–2017: Inter USA Academy
- 2017–2020: Philadelphia Union

Senior career*
Years	Team	Apps	(Gls)
2019–2020	Philadelphia Union II	25	(1)
2022–2024	Inter Miami II	30	(15)
2023–2024	Inter Miami	16	(1)
2023	→ New Mexico United (loan)	11	(0)
2024–2025	Vendsyssel	26	(7)
2025	Bhayangkara Presisi	7	(0)
2026–	Varbergs BoIS	29	(7)

International career
2018	Haiti U20	3	(1)
2021–2023	Haiti	5	(0)
- * Club domestic league appearances and goals as of 11 November 2026

Shanyder Antonio Borgelin (born 19 October 2001) is a professional footballer who plays as a forward for Superettan club Varbergs BoIS. Born in the United States, he plays for the Haiti national team.

== Career ==
=== Bethlehem Steel ===
Borgelin appeared as an amateur player for USL Championship side Bethlehem Steel during their 2019 season after joining the Philadelphia Union academy in 2017.

=== Inter Miami II ===
Borgelin signed for Inter Miami II in February 2022.

=== Inter Miami ===
On 16 February 2023 Borgelin signed a homegrown player contract with the Inter Miami MLS squad. On 25 February he made his debut with the club as a substitute and scored his first MLS goal in a 2–0 victory against CF Montréal.

==== New Mexico United (loan) ====
Signed on 16 August 2023, on loan from Inter Miami CF for the remainder of the 2023 season.

=== Vendsyssel FF ===
On 8 August 2024, Borgelin was sold to Vendsyssel FF of the Danish First Division for an undisclosed transfer fee. In June 2025, after a season where Vendsyssel got relegated, it was confirmed that Borgelin's contract had been terminated by mutual consent.

=== Bhayangkara Presisi ===
On 11 July 2025, Borgelin signed with Indonesia club Bhayangkara Presisi.

=== Varbergs BoIS ===
On 6 January 2026, Borgelin signed with Superettan side Varbergs BoIS.

== International career ==
Borgelin debuted with the Haiti national team in a friendly 5–1 loss to Bahrain on 1 September 2021.

== Career statistics ==
As of match played on 11 November 2026

Club statistics
Club	Season	League			National Cup		Other		Total	
Club	Season	Division	Apps	Goals	Apps	Goals	Apps	Goals	Apps	Goals
Bethlehem Steel FC	2019	USL Championship	23	1	—		—		23	1
Bethlehem Steel FC	2020	USL Championship	2	0	—		—		2	0
Bethlehem Steel FC	Total		25	1	0	0	0	0	25	1
Inter Miami CF	2023	Major League Soccer	10	1	2	1	—		12	2
Inter Miami CF	2024	Major League Soccer	6	0	0	0	—		6	0
Inter Miami CF	Total		16	1	2	1	0	0	18	1
New Mexico United (loan)	2023	USL Championship	11	0			—		11	0
Vendsyssel	2024–25	Danish 1st Division	26	7	0	0	—		26	7
Bhayangkara Presisi	2025–26	Super League	7	0	0	0	—		7	0
Varbergs BoIS	2026	Superettan	29	7	2	0	—		31	7
Career totals			114	16	4	1	0	0	118	17
