= Cole Turner (soccer) =

American soccer player (born 2001)

Personal information
- Full name: Cole Turner
- Date of birth: July 7, 2001 (age 25)
- Place of birth: Churchville, Maryland, United States
- Height: 6 ft 2 in (1.88 m)
- Positions: Midfielder; defender

Youth career
- Baltimore Celtic
- Baltimore Bays
- 2015–2019: Philadelphia Union

Senior career*
| Years | Team | Apps | (Gls) |
| 2019–2022 | Philadelphia Union II | 49 | (1) |
| 2020–2022 | Philadelphia Union | 2 | (0) |
| 2021 | → El Paso Locomotive (loan) | 9 | (0) |
| 2023–2025 | Loudoun United | 35 | (0) |
- * Club domestic league appearances and goals as of October 25, 2025

Cole Turner (born July 7, 2001) is an American professional soccer player who plays as a midfielder.

== Career ==
=== Youth ===
Born in Churchville, Maryland, Turner started his youth career with Baltimore Celtic before moving to Baltimore Bays. In 2015, he moved to the Philadelphia Union, joining the club's YSC Academy. In February 2018, Turner committed to playing college soccer with the Navy Midshipmen at the United States Naval Academy.

In 2019, Turner began playing with the Union's reserve affiliate, Bethlehem Steel, on a USL academy contract, allowing him to keep his college soccer eligibility. He made his debut for the side on March 10 against Birmingham Legion, coming on as a substitute for Saed Díaz in the 88th minute.

=== Philadelphia Union ===
On July 17, 2019, Turner signed a professional pre-contract with the Philadelphia Union. He would join the club as a homegrown player officially on January 1, 2020, and would continue playing with the Bethlehem Steel for the rest of the 2019 season. He finished his first season with the Steel with 25 appearances.

Turner made his Philadelphia Union competitive debut on September 20, 2020, against the Montreal Impact, coming on as a late substitute for Alejandro Bedoya. Although he only appeared once for the Union, Turner was still part of the Union bench 15 times as the club won the Supporters' Shield in the 2020 season.

On September 27, 2021, Turner moved on loan to USL Championship side El Paso Locomotive for the remainder of the 2021 season.

Following the 2022 season, Turner's contract option was declined by Philadelphia.

On January 19, 2023, Turner signed with USL Championship side Loudoun United for their 2023 season. Turner was released by Loudoun following their 2025 season.

== Career statistics ==
As of match played August 8, 2021

Appearances and goals by club, season and competition
| Club | Season | League | | | Playoffs | | National cup | | Continental | | Total | |
| Club | Season | Division | Apps | Goals | Apps | Goals | Apps | Goals | Apps | Goals | Apps | Goals |
|---|---|---|---|---|---|---|---|---|---|---|---|---|
| Philadelphia Union II | 2019 | USL Championship | 25 | 0 | — | | — | | — | | 25 | 0 |
| Philadelphia Union II | 2020 | USL Championship | 4 | 0 | — | | — | | — | | 4 | 0 |
| Philadelphia Union II | Total | | 29 | 0 | — | | — | | — | | 29 | 0 |
| Philadelphia Union | 2020 | Major League Soccer | 1 | 0 | 0 | 0 | — | | — | | 1 | 0 |
| Philadelphia Union | 2021 | Major League Soccer | 0 | 0 | — | | — | | 0 | 0 | 0 | 0 |
| Philadelphia Union | Total | | 1 | 0 | 0 | 0 | 0 | 0 | 0 | 0 | 1 | 0 |
| Career total | | | 30 | 0 | 0 | 0 | 0 | 0 | 0 | 0 | 30 | 0 |
