= Josh Fawole =

American soccer player (born 1998)

Personal information
- Full name: Joshua Ayoola Fawole
- Date of birth: July 21, 1998 (age 28)
- Place of birth: Columbia, Maryland, U.S.
- Height: 6 ft 1 in (1.85 m)
- Position: Forward

Youth career
- 2012–2015: MSC Falcons
- 2015–2016: Baltimore Celtic

College career
Years	Team	Apps	(Gls)
2016–2019	Loyola Greyhounds	68	(20)

Senior career*
Years	Team	Apps	(Gls)
2016	Baltimore Bohemians	11	(4)
2018	FC Baltimore	9	(10)
2019	The Villages SC	11	(2)
2020	Loudoun United	10	(1)
2021–2022	Aldershot Town	3	(0)
2021–2022	→ Farnborough (loan)	4	(0)
2022	→ Salisbury (loan)	5	(1)
2022	→ Beaconsfield Town (loan)	7	(0)
2022–2023	Maidstone United	20	(0)
2023	Aveley	2	(0)
2023	Dulwich Hamlet	9	(0)
2024	Central Valley Fuego	3	(0)
- * Club domestic league appearances and goals as of October 31, 2024

Joshua Ayoola Fawole (born July 21, 1998) is an American soccer player who plays as a forward.

== Career ==
=== College ===
Fawole played four years of college soccer at Loyola University Maryland between 2016 and 2019, making 68 appearances, scoring 20 goals and tallying 10 assists.

While playing at college, Fawole appeared in the USL PDL with Baltimore Bohemians in 2016, NPSL side FC Baltimore in 2018, and the now rebranded USL League Two in 2019 with The Villages SC.

=== Professional ===
On January 9, 2020, Fawole was selected 42nd overall in the 2020 MLS SuperDraft by D.C. United. Though D.C. United declined to make him an offer, Fawole did sign with their USL Championship affiliate, Loudoun United, on March 6, 2020. He made his professional debut on March 7, 2020, appearing as a 57th-minute substitute in a 0–0 draw with Philadelphia Union II.

On October 8, 2021, following a trial period, Fawole agreed to join Aldershot Town of the National League, before immediately joining Farnborough on a short-term loan. Fawole returned to Aldershot in January and went onto feature four times in all competitions before another loan move, this time joining Salisbury in February. On 22 March 2022, Fawole then joined Southern League Premier Division South side Beaconsfield Town on loan. Fawole was released at the end of the 2021–22 season.

In August 2022, Fawole joined Maidstone United, following a successful trial period and went onto make his debut during a 2–1 home victory over York City.

On March 4, 2023, Fawole agreed to join Dulwich Hamlet F.C of the National League South after being released from Maidstone United and a brief one-month stint at Aveley FC. He made his debut for the club that same day in the 70th minute of a 1–0 win against fellow National League South side St. Albans City F.C.

Fawole returned to the United States on March 11, 2024, joining third-tier side Central Valley Fuego.

== Career statistics ==
As of match played March 13, 2023

Appearances and goals by club, season and competition
Club	Season	League			National Cup		League Cup		Other		Total	
Club	Season	Division	Apps	Goals	Apps	Goals	Apps	Goals	Apps	Goals	Apps	Goals
Baltimore Bohemians	2016	USL PDL Eastern Conference Mid Atlantic Division	11	4	0	0	—		—		11	4
FC Baltimore	2018	NPSL Northeast Region Mid-Atlantic Conference	9	10	0	0	—		—		9	10
The Villages SC	2019	USL League Two Southern Conference Southeast Division	11	2	2	0	—		—		13	2
Loudoun United	2020	USL Championship Group F	10	1	0	0	—		—		10	1
Aldershot Town	2021–22	National League	3	0	0	0	—		1 (Note: Appearance in the FA Trophy)	0	4	0
Farnborough (loan)	2021–22	Southern League Premier Division South	4	0	—		—		0	0	4	0
Salisbury (loan)	2021–22	Southern League Premier Division South	5	1	—		—		—		5	1
Beaconsfield Town (loan)	2021–22	Southern League Premier Division South	7	0	—		—		—		7	0
Maidstone United	2022–23	National League	20	0	0	0	—		0	0	1	0
Career total			80	18	2	0	0	0	1	0	64	18
