= David Rabadán =

Spanish footballer

Personal information
- Full name: David Rabadán Lucas
- Date of birth: 22 May 2000 (age 26)
- Place of birth: Madrid, Spain
- Height: 1.83 m (6 ft 0 in)
- Position: Midfielder

Team information
- Current team: Ourense
- Number: 18

Youth career
- Albacete

Senior career*
Years	Team	Apps	(Gls)
2018–2021	Albacete B	44	(2)
2020	→ Philadelphia Union II (loan)	12	(0)
2020–2021	→ Internacional Madrid (loan)	22	(4)
2021–2024	Osasuna B	47	(3)
2024–2025	Unionistas	37	(4)
2025–	Ourense	17	(1)
- * Club domestic league appearances and goals as of 10 June 2026

David Rabadán Lucas (born 22 May 2000) is a Spanish footballer who plays as a midfielder for Primera Federación club Ourense.

== Career ==
Rabadán played with Atlético Albacete for three years, before moving on loan to USL Championship side Philadelphia Union II, the reserve team for MLS side Philadelphia Union.

On 28 June 2024, Rabadán signed with Unionistas in the third tier.
