= Walter Cortés =

Costa Rican footballer (born 2000)

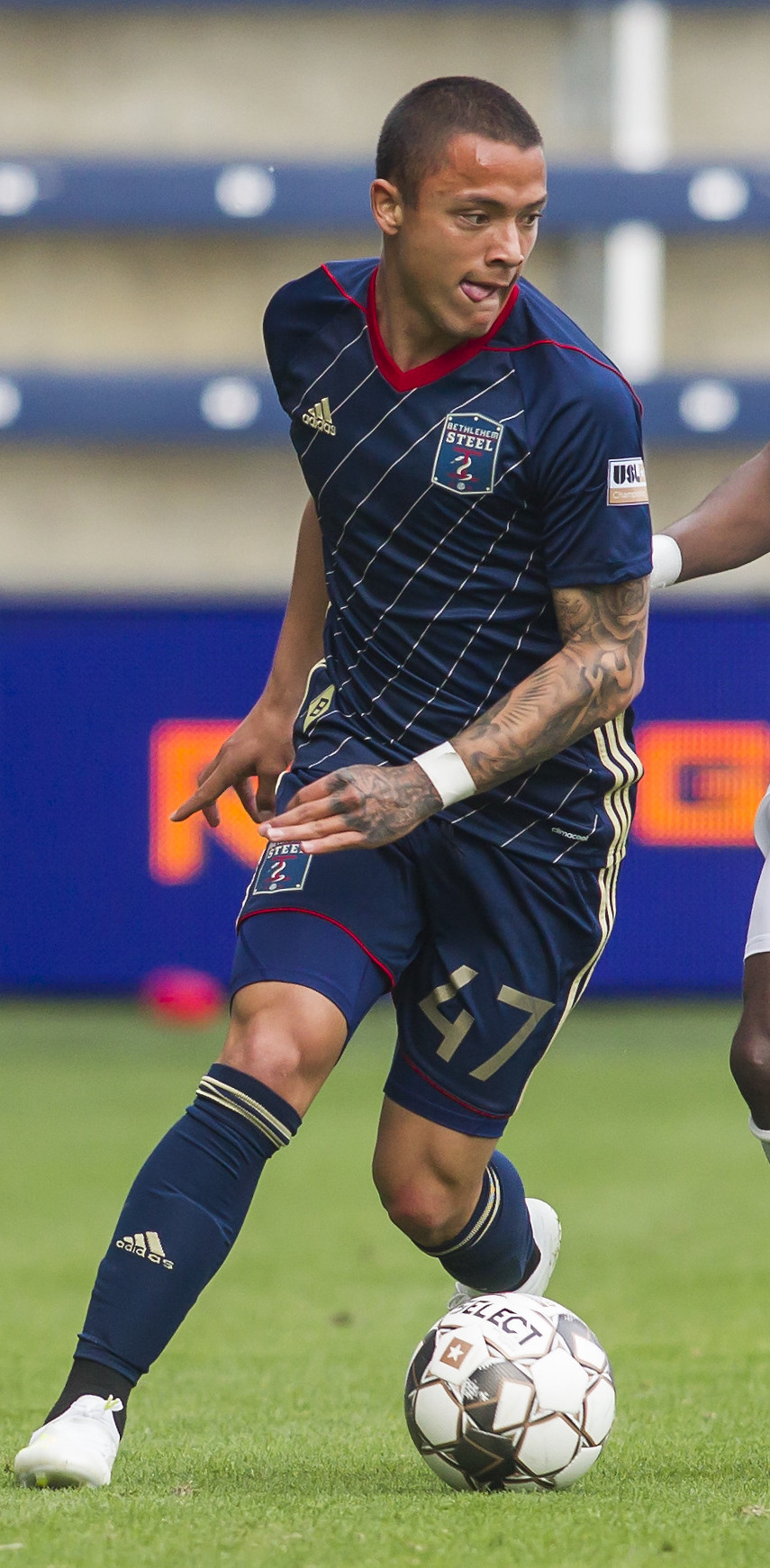
- Cortés with Bethlehem Steel in 2019

Personal information
- Full name: Walter Eduardo Cortés Pérez
- Date of birth: 5 February 2000 (age 26)
- Place of birth: San José, Costa Rica
- Height: 1.75 m (5 ft 9 in)
- Position: Defender

Team information
- Current team: Santos de Guápiles
- Number: 33

Youth career
- Saprissa

Senior career*
Years	Team	Apps	(Gls)
2019–2022	Saprissa	41	(0)
2019	→ Bethlehem Steel (loan)	27	(3)
2022–2023	Guanacasteca	18	(2)
2023–2025	Sporting	42	(1)
2025–	Santos de Guápiles	12	(0)

International career
2018	Costa Rica U20	6	(1)
- * Club domestic league appearances and goals as of 25 April 2025

Walter Eduardo Cortés Pérez (born 5 February 2000) is a Costa Rican professional footballer who plays as a defender for Santos de Guápiles.

== Honours ==
=== Club ===
Saprissa

- Liga FPD: Clausura 2020, Clausura 2021
