= Yomi Scintu =

German footballer (born 19979

Personal information
- Full name: Yomi Samuele Scintu
- Date of birth: May 20, 1997 (age 29)
- Place of birth: Munich, Germany
- Height: 1.93 m (6 ft 4 in)
- Position: Forward

Team information
- Current team: Türkgücü München
- Number: 11

Youth career
- –2010: MTV Ingolstadt
- 2010–2016: FC Ingolstadt 04

Senior career*
Years	Team	Apps	(Gls)
2016–2019	VfB Eichstätt	75	(23)
2019–2020	Philadelphia Union II	14	(2)
2021–2022	Türkgücü München	1	(0)
2022–2023	Sonnenhof Großaspach	7	(2)
2023	Wacker Burghausen	5	(0)
2023–2024	Pipinsried	17	(3)
2024–	Türkgücü München	17	(1)
- * Club domestic league appearances and goals as of 1 January 2025

Yomi Samuele Scintu (born 20 May 1997) is a German footballer who plays as a forward for Regionalliga Bayern club Türkgücü München.

== Career ==
After three seasons with VfB Eichstätt in Germany, Scintu joined USL Championship side Bethlehem Steel on 7 March 2019.

On 18 June 2021, Scintu signed with 3. Liga side Türkgücü München.

Scintu joined recently relegated Oberliga Baden-Württemberg club Sonnenhof Großaspach on 20 September 2022.

== Personal life ==
He was born to a Nigerian mother and an Italian father.
