= Selmir Miscic =

American soccer player

Personal information
- Date of birth: January 23, 2003 (age 23)
- Place of birth: Burlington, Vermont, United States
- Height: 5 ft 8 in (1.73 m)
- Position: Winger

Youth career
- 2016–2018: Philadelphia Union

Senior career*
Years	Team	Apps	(Gls)
2018–2021	Philadelphia Union II	16	(2)
2021	→ North Carolina (loan)	25	(4)
2022–2023	Portland Timbers 2	38	(4)
2024–2025	Algeciras	0	(0)
- * Club domestic league appearances and goals as of January 8, 2025

Selmir Miscic (born January 23, 2003) is an American soccer player who plays as a midfielder.

== Career ==
After spending over two years with the Philadelphia Union academy, Miscic signed a professional contract with Philadelphia's USL Championship side Philadelphia Union II on September 12, 2018. He made his professional debut on June 9, 2019, as an 86th-minute substitute during a 4–1 loss to Nashville SC.

In March 2021, Miscic was loaned to North Carolina FC in USL League One for the 2021 season.

On August 9, 2024, Miscic signed with Algeciras in the Spanish third-tier Primera Federación.

== Personal life ==
Miscic's parents emigrated to the United States from Bosnia and Herzegovina during the Bosnian War. His father was also a professional footballer in both Bosnia and Germany.
