= Danny Flores (soccer) =

American soccer player (born 2002)

Personal information
- Full name: Danny Luis Flores Gonzales
- Date of birth: April 6, 2002 (age 24)
- Place of birth: Half Moon Bay, California, United States
- Height: 5 ft 8 in (1.73 m)
- Positions: Midfielder; defender

Team information
- Current team: Whitecaps FC 2
- Number: 47

Youth career
- –2016: Juventus SC
- 2016–2018: Shattuck-Saint Mary's
- 2018–2020: Philadelphia Union

College career
Years	Team	Apps	(Gls)
2021–2022	Virginia Tech Hokies	33	(5)

Senior career*
Years	Team	Apps	(Gls)
2019–2020	Philadelphia Union II	20	(1)
2021	Oakland Roots	12	(1)
2023–2024	Sporting Kansas City	1	(0)
2023–2024	Sporting Kansas City II	39	(3)
2025	Tulsa Athletic	0	(0)
2025–	Whitecaps FC 2	0	(0)

International career
2018	United States U-17	1	(0)
- * Club domestic league appearances and goals as of March 20, 2025

Danny Luis Flores Gonzales (born April 6, 2002) is an American soccer player who plays for Whitecaps FC 2.

== Career ==
Flores appeared as an amateur player for USL Championship side Bethlehem Steel during their 2019 season, as well as being part of the Philadelphia Union academy.

On April 19, 2021, Flores returned to his native Northern California, joining Oakland Roots SC on a USL Academy contract.

He joined Sporting Kansas City ahead of the 2023 season.

Flores joined Tulsa Athletic for the club's participation in the 2025 U.S. Open Cup.
