= Caden Stafford =

American soccer player

Personal information
- Full name: Caden Stafford
- Date of birth: September 28, 2003 (age 23)
- Place of birth: United States
- Height: 6 ft 0 in (1.83 m)
- Position: Forward

Team information
- Current team: Maryland Terrapins
- Number: 10

Youth career
- –2019: Syracuse Development Academy
- 2019–2020: Philadelphia Union

College career
Years	Team	Apps	(Gls)
2021–	Maryland Terrapins	0	(0)

Senior career*
Years	Team	Apps	(Gls)
2020	Philadelphia Union II	8	(2)
2021	Ocean City Nor'easters	4	(1)
- * Club domestic league appearances and goals as of October 6, 2020

Caden Stafford (born September 28, 2003) is an American soccer player who plays as a forward for Maryland Terrapins.

== Career ==
=== Youth ===
Stafford joined the Philadelphia Union academy in 2019 from the Syracuse Development Academy. He made his debut with the club's USL Championship affiliate side, Philadelphia Union II, on August 5, 2020. He appeared as a 82nd-minute substitute during a 3–2 win over New York Red Bulls II.

=== College & USL League Two ===
In 2021, Stafford attended the University of Maryland, College Park to play college soccer.

Stafford also appeared for USL League Two side Ocean City Nor'easters in 2021, scoring a single goal in four regular season and two playoff appearances.

== Career statistics ==
=== Club ===
As of matches played October 6, 2020

Appearances and goals by club, season and competition
Club	Season	League			Cup		Continental		Total	
Club	Season	Division	Apps	Goals	Apps	Goals	Apps	Goals	Apps	Goals
Philadelphia Union II	2020	USL Championship	8	2	—	—	—	—	8	2
Career total			8	2	0	0	0	0	8	2
