= Gabriel Gómez (footballer, born 1997) =

Argentine footballer

Personal information
- Full name: Gabriel Gómez
- Date of birth: 4 April 1997 (age 29)
- Place of birth: Buenos Aires, Argentina
- Height: 5 ft 5 in (1.65 m)
- Position: Midfielder

Team information
- Current team: Nueva Chicago

Youth career
- Nueva Chicago

Senior career*
Years	Team	Apps	(Gls)
2014–2018	Nueva Chicago	1	(0)
2020	Loudoun United	4	(0)
2020–	Nueva Chicago	0	(0)
- * Club domestic league appearances and goals as of 17:19, 27 September 2020 (UTC)

Gabriel Gómez (born 4 April 1997) is an Argentinian professional footballer who plays as a midfielder for Nueva Chicago.

== Club career ==
Born in Buenos Aires, Gómez began his career with Nueva Chicago in Primera B Metropolitana, Argentina's third division. He made his debut for the club on 24 May 2014 against Comunicaciones, coming on as a substitute as the club lost 1–0.

Gómez then moved to the United States in 2018 and trained with D.C. United, his father's old club. On 28 January 2020, it was announced that Gómez signed with D.C. United's reserve side, Loudoun United. He made his professional debut for the club on 5 September 2020 against Hartford Athletic. He came on as an 89th-minute substitute for Nelson Martinez as Loudoun lost 2–1. He returned to Nueva Chicago in October 2020.

== Personal life ==
Gómez is the son of former professional footballer Christian Gómez who played for both D.C. United and Nueva Chicago.

== Career statistics ==
=== Club ===
As of match played 26 September 2020

Appearances and goals by club, season and competition
Club	Season	League			Cup		Continental		Total	
Club	Season	Division	Apps	Goals	Apps	Goals	Apps	Goals	Apps	Goals
Loudoun United	2020	USL Championship	4	0	—	—	—	—	4	0
Career total			4	0	0	0	0	0	4	0
