= Jamoi Topey =

Jamaican footballer (born 2000)

Personal information
- Full name: Jamoi Wade Topey
- Date of birth: 13 January 2000 (age 26)
- Place of birth: Portmore, Jamaica
- Height: 6 ft 6 in (1.98 m)
- Position: Defender

Team information
- Current team: Mount Pleasant
- Number: 42

Youth career
- Cavalier

Senior career*
Years	Team	Apps	(Gls)
2017–2022	Cavalier	51	(6)
2019–2020	→ Philadelphia Union II (loan)	17	(1)
2022–	Mount Pleasant	35	(1)

International career^{‡}
2015–2017	Jamaica U17	7	(0)
2018–2019	Jamaica U20	5	(4)
2019	Jamaica U23	2	(0)
2019–	Jamaica	9	(0)
- * Club domestic league appearances and goals as of 9 December 2023 ‡ National team caps and goals as of 9 December 2023

Jamoi Wade Topey (born 13 January 2000) is a Jamaican footballer who plays as a defender for Mount Pleasant Football Academy.

== Career ==
=== Club ===
Topey played for Camperdown High School in the Manning Cup during his schoolboy career. After two seasons with top flight Jamaica National Premier League side Cavalier, Topey moved on loan to USL Championship side Bethlehem Steel on 1 March 2019. In December 2020, Philadelphia Union decline the club option and released Topey.

In 2021, Topey returned to his former club Cavalier F.C. in the Jamaica Premier League and helped them to win the 2021 title.

Topey joined Mount Pleasant in 2022, helping the club to win their first ever Jamaica Premier League title in the 2022–23 season.

=== International ===
Topey has featured for Jamaica at the u17 and u20 levels. In March 2019, Topey was called to the senior national team. Topey made his senior international debut on 26 March 2019 versus Costa Rica.

In July 2019, Topey also featured for the Jamaica u23 olympic team.

== Career statistics ==
As of matches played 16 January 2022

Appearances and goals by club, season and competition
Club	Season	League			Continental (Note: Includes Caribbean Club Championship)		Total	
Club	Season	Division	Apps	Goals	Apps	Goals	Apps	Goals
Cavalier	2017–18	National Premier League	20	1	—		20	1
Cavalier	2018–19	National Premier League	20	3	—		20	3
Cavalier	2021	National Premier League	7	1	—		7	1
Cavalier	2022	National Premier League	1	1	0	0	1	1
Cavalier	Total		48	6	0	0	48	6
Philadelphia Union II (loan)	2019	USL Championship	9	1	—		9	1
Philadelphia Union II (loan)	2020	USL Championship	8	0	—		8	0
Philadelphia Union II (loan)	Total		17	1	—		17	1
Career Total			65	7	0	0	65	7

== Honors ==
=== Cavalier ===
- Jamaica Premier League: 2021

=== Mount Pleasant ===
- Jamaica Premier League: 2022-203
