= Allexon Saravia =

Salvadoran footballer (born 2000)

Personal information
- Full name: Allexon Saravia Zambrano
- Date of birth: 22 September 2000 (age 26)
- Place of birth: Alexandria, Virginia, U.S.
- Height: 5 ft 6 1/2 in (1.69 m)
- Position: Defender

Team information
- Current team: Águila
- Number: 30

Youth career
- –2019: D.C. United

Senior career*
Years	Team	Apps	(Gls)
2019–2021	Loudoun United	35	(0)
2022	Des Moines Menace	2	(0)
2022–	Águila	13	(0)

International career^{‡}
2017	El Salvador U17	1	(0)
2021–	El Salvador	1	(0)
- * Club domestic league appearances and goals as of 19:07, 3 February 2023 (UTC) ‡ National team caps and goals as of 18:44, 20 March 2019 (UTC)

Allexon Saravia Zambrano (born 22 September 2000) is a professional footballer who plays as a defender for Primera División club Águila. Born in the United States, he plays for the El Salvador national team.

== Career ==
Savaria previously spent 4 years in the D.C. United Academy, totaling 56 match appearances and scoring 6 goals.

Saravia joined Loudoun United in June 2019. He was re-signed by Loudoun ahead of the 2020 season.

== Career statistics ==
=== Club ===
As of 1 February 2023

Club	Season	League			Cup		Continental		Other		Total	
Club	Season	Division	Apps	Goals	Apps	Goals	Apps	Goals	Apps	Goals	Apps	Goals
Loudoun United	2019	USL Championship	12	0	–		–		0	0	12	0
Loudoun United	2020	USL Championship	12	0	–		–		0	0	12	0
Loudoun United	2021	USL Championship	11	0	–		–		0	0	11	0
Loudoun United	Total		35	0	0	0	0	0	0	0	35	0
Águila	2022–23	Salvadoran Primera División	13	0	0	0	0	0	0	0	13	0
Career total			48	0	0	0	0	0	0	0	48	0
