= Issa Rayyan =

American soccer player

Personal information
- Date of birth: August 24, 2000 (age 26)
- Place of birth: Dearborn, Michigan, United States
- Height: 5 ft 9 in (1.75 m)
- Position: Midfielder

Youth career
- 2015–2017: Philadelphia Union

College career
| Years | Team | Apps | (Gls) |
| 2018 | Duke Blue Devils | 20 | (6) |

Senior career*
| Years | Team | Apps | (Gls) |
| 2017–2020 | Philadelphia Union II | 34 | (4) |
| 2021 | Tacoma Defiance | 19 | (0) |
| 2022 | Colorado Springs Switchbacks | 21 | (0) |
| 2023 | Las Vegas Lights | 8 | (0) |

International career
| 2016 | United States U16 | | |
- * Club domestic league appearances and goals as of October 21, 2023

Issa Rayyan (born August 24, 2000) is an American soccer player.

== Career ==
Rayyan appeared as an amateur player for United Soccer League side Bethlehem Steel FC during their 2017 season. Rayyan committed to play college soccer at Duke University in 2018. On February 26, 2019, Rayyan left Duke after just one season to sign a professional contract with Bethlehem Steel.

On March 16, 2021, Rayyan signed with USL Championship side Tacoma Defiance.

On December 16, 2021, Rayyan moved to USL Championship club Colorado Springs Switchbacks ahead of their 2022 season.

Rayyan was announced as a new signing for USL Championship side Las Vegas Lights on January 25, 2023.

== Personal life ==
Rayyan was born in the United States to Jordanian parents.
