= Todd Morton =

American soccer player

Personal information
- Full name: Todd Charles Morton
- Date of birth: December 5, 1995 (age 30)
- Place of birth: West Chester, Pennsylvania, United States
- Height: 1.92 m (6 ft 4 in)
- Position: Goalkeeper

College career
Years	Team	Apps	(Gls)
2014	UMBC Retrievers	0	(0)
2015–2018	Delaware Fightin' Blue Hens	65	(0)

Senior career*
Years	Team	Apps	(Gls)
2015	Reading United AC	1	(0)
2016	Lehigh Valley United	1	(0)
2016–2018	Ocean City Nor'easters	19	(0)
2019	Real Monarchs	0	(0)
2019–2020	Philadelphia Union II	10	(0)
- * Club domestic league appearances and goals as of October 6, 2020

Todd Charles Morton (born December 5, 1995) is an American soccer player who plays as a goalkeeper.

== Career ==
=== College and amateur ===
Morton began playing college soccer at the University of Maryland, Baltimore County in 2015, but transferred to the University of Delaware in 2016, where he played for four years.

While at college, Morton also appeared for a variety of USL Premier Development League sides; Reading United AC in 2015, Lehigh Valley United in 2016, and Ocean City Nor'easters from 2017 to 2018.

=== Professional ===
On February 11, 2019, Morton joined USL Championship side Real Monarchs. Morton transferred to USL side Bethlehem Steel on August 1, 2019, for an undisclosed fee. He made his debut the same day, starting in a 3–0 loss to Hartford Athletic.

== Personal ==
Todd's brother is fellow professional soccer goalkeeper, Kyle Morton, who currently plays for the Houston Dynamo in MLS.
