= Brandon Williamson (soccer) =

American soccer player (born 1998)

Personal information
- Date of birth: April 2, 1998 (age 28)
- Place of birth: Gainesville, Virginia, United States
- Height: 1.78 m (5 ft 10 in)
- Position: Defensive midfielder

Team information
- Current team: Northern Virginia FC
- Number: 19

Youth career
- 2010–2016: D.C. United

College career
Years	Team	Apps	(Gls)
2016–2019	Duke Blue Devils	70	(4)

Senior career*
Years	Team	Apps	(Gls)
2019	Wake FC	1	(0)
2020	Loudoun United	10	(0)
2022	Northern Virginia FC		
- * Club domestic league appearances and goals as of September 26, 2020

Brandon Williamson (born April 2, 1998) is an American soccer player who played as a defensive midfielder for Northern Virginia FC.

== Career ==
=== College and amateur ===
Williamson played four years of college soccer at Duke University between 2016 and 2019, making 70 appearances, scoring 4 goals and tallying 7 assists.

While playing at college, Williamson also appeared in the USL League Two with Wake FC in 2019.

=== Professional ===
Williamson was originally projected to be a first-round draft pick in the 2020 MLS SuperDraft, but went undrafted.

On February 25, 2020, Williamson signed with USL Championship side Loudoun United. He made his professional debut on March 7, appearing as a 76th-minute substitute in a 0–0 draw with Philadelphia Union II.
