= Tyler Gabarra =

American soccer player who currently plays for Albion San Diego in NISA

Tyler Gabarra (born July 28, 1997) is an American soccer player who currently plays for Albion San Diego in the National Independent Soccer Association.

== Career ==
=== College and amateur ===
Gabarra attended Broadneck High School, where he played on the soccer team as a midfielder and defender. In September 2014, he committed to play college soccer at North Carolina State University.

Gabarra played four seasons for the Wolfpack between 2016 and 2019, making 60 appearances, scoring three goals and tallying eight assists.

While playing at college, Gabarra appeared in the USL PDL with Baltimore Bohemians in 2016, NPSL side FC Baltimore in 2018.

=== Professional ===
On June 30, 2020, Gabarra signed with USL Championship side Loudoun United. He made his debut for Loudoun on July 19, 2020, appearing as a 62nd-minute substitute during a 3–1 loss to Hartford Athletic.

Following the 2021 USL Championship season, Gabarra's contract with Loudoun was not renewed. He then joined Albion San Diego in the National Independent Soccer Association.

== Personal life ==
Gabarra is the son of former American soccer player and coach Jim Gabarra and former women's soccer player Carin Jennings-Gabarra. Gabarra is of Polish descent with roots in Wisła.
