= Saed Díaz =

Panamanian footballer (born 1999)

Personal information
- Full name: Saed Ismael Díaz De León
- Date of birth: 23 June 1999 (age 27)
- Place of birth: Panama City, Panama
- Height: 1.84 m (6 ft 0 in)
- Position: Forward

Team information
- Current team: Tauro

Senior career*
Years	Team	Apps	(Gls)
2017–2020	Tauro	2	(0)
2019	→ Bethlehem Steel (loan)	9	(0)
2020	Philadelphia Union II	3	(0)
2020–2021	Tauro	26	(3)

International career^{‡}
2018	Panama U20	4	(4)
- * Club domestic league appearances and goals as of 6 October 2020 ‡ National team caps and goals as of 11 March 2019

Saed Ismael Díaz De León (born 23 June 1999) is a Panamanian footballer who plays as a forward for Tauro.
