= Kairou Amoustapha =

Nigerien footballer

Personal information
- Full name: Abdoul Kairou Amoustapha
- Date of birth: 1 January 2001 (age 25)
- Place of birth: Niamey, Niger
- Height: 5 ft 10 in (1.78 m)
- Position: Forward

Senior career*
Years	Team	Apps	(Gls)
2017–2020	ASN Nigelec		
2020–2021	Loudoun United	26	(5)
2021–2024	Cancún	30	(2)
2024	CSKA 1948 II	3	(0)
2025	Hamrun Spartans	9	(0)

International career^{‡}
2017	Niger U17	3	(0)
2019	Niger U20	3	(1)
2020–	Niger	4	(1)
- * Club domestic league appearances and goals as of 14 June 2025 ‡ National team caps and goals as of 14 October 2023

Abdoul Kairou Amoustapha (born 1 January 2001) is a Nigerien professional footballer who plays as a forward.

== Career ==
Amoustapha moved from ASN Nigelec to USL Championship side Loudoun United on 20 February 2020. He made his debut on 2 August 2020, starting against Hartford Athletic in a 1–4 loss.

In October 2020, Amoustapha began training with Loudoun's parent club D.C. United after the conclusion of Loudoun's season. In October 2021, Amoustapha was recalled to his parent club, MFK Vyskov. He was subsequently dispatched to Cancún F.C. immediately following his return from Loudoun.

=== International ===
Amoustapha has made three appearances each on the Niger U-17 and U-20 national football teams. He scored his first international goal with the U-20 side during the 2019 Africa U-20 Cup of Nations, on 9 February 2019, against Burundi's own U-20 side, in a match that ended in a 3–3 draw.

On 31 October 2020, Amoustapha was called up by the senior Niger national football team as part of the preliminary squad for the 2021 Africa Cup of Nations qualification round. He later made his first appearance with the national team on 13 November, coming in as a substitute in Niger's 1–0 victory over Ethiopia.
