= Steve Kingue =

Cameroonian footballer

Personal information
- Date of birth: 23 January 2000 (age 26)
- Place of birth: Yaoundé, Cameroon
- Height: 1.85 m (6 ft 1 in)
- Position: Centre-back

Team information
- Current team: Radomiak Radom
- Number: 14

Senior career*
Years	Team	Apps	(Gls)
2018–2021	Nkufo Academy Sports		
2018	→ Tallinna Kalev (loan)	14	(3)
2019–2020	→ Philadelphia Union II (loan)	26	(1)
2021	1. FK Příbram	10	(0)
2022–2023	Mosta	16	(0)
2023–2025	Hegelmann	44	(5)
2025–	Radomiak Radom	40	(2)
- * Club domestic league appearances and goals as of 22:34, 13 October 2026 (UTC)

Steve Kingue (born 23 January 2000) is a Cameroonian professional footballer who plays as a centre-back for Polish club Radomiak Radom.

== Career ==
Kingue started his career at Nkufo Academy Sports, and had loan spells at Estonian club Tallinna Kalev and American side Philadelphia Union II.

In 2021, he signed with Czech side 1. FK Příbram, before moving to Maltese outfit Mosta in 2022.

On 24 August 2023, Lithuanian club Hegelmann announced the signing of Kingue. On 7 January 2025, it was announced he would be leaving the club.

The following day, he joined Polish side Radomiak Radom on a two-and-a-half-year deal.
