= Ben Ofeimu =

American soccer player (born 2000)

Personal information
- Full name: Benjamin Ofeimu
- Date of birth: September 30, 2000 (age 26)
- Place of birth: West Bloomfield, Michigan, United States
- Height: 6 ft 3 in (1.91 m)
- Position: Defender

Team information
- Current team: Las Vegas Lights
- Number: 30

Youth career
- 2014–2015: Vardar SC
- 2015–2019: Philadelphia Union

Senior career*
Years	Team	Apps	(Gls)
2018–2020	Philadelphia Union II	46	(3)
2021	Birmingham Legion	15	(0)
2022–2024	Miami	39	(1)
2024–2025	Indy Eleven	56	(4)
2026–	Las Vegas Lights	18	(0)
- * Club domestic league appearances and goals as of October 31, 2026

Benjamin Ofeimu (born September 30, 2000) is an American soccer player who plays as a defender for Las Vegas Lights in the USL Championship.

== Playing career ==
=== Youth ===
Ofeimu appeared as an amateur player for United Soccer League side Bethlehem Steel FC during their 2018 season via the Philadelphia Union academy.

Ofeimu has committed to playing college soccer at Penn State University from 2019 onward.

=== Club ===
==== Philadelphia Union II (2018–2020) ====
In January 2019, Ofeimu officially signed his first professional contract with Bethlehem Steel FC, later named Philadelphia Union II, having impressed during his academy loan spells during the 2018 season.

==== Birmingham Legion (2021) ====
On May 1, 2021, Ofeimu signed with USL Championship side Birmingham Legion. Following the 2021 season, Birmingham declined their contract option on Ofeimu.

==== Miami FC (2022–2024) ====
Ofeimu joined Miami FC on January 25, 2022.

==== Indy Eleven (2024–present) ====
Ofeimu joined USL Championship club Indy Eleven on April 11, 2024, as part of a swap deal with Miami FC. Ofeimu made his debut for the club in the U.S. Open Cup, starting in a 1–0 away win over MLS Next Pro side Chicago Fire FC II on April 17, 2024. He made his first league appearance three days later, appearing as a substitute in the 67th minute in a 1–1 away draw with Colorado Springs Switchbacks on April 20, replacing defender Josh O'Brien.

Ofeimu scored his first goal for the Eleven on May 18, in a 4–1 home victory over Hartford Athletic. He scored the final goal of the game, and his second of the season, in a 3–0 home victory over Detroit City FC in the Round of 16 of the U.S. Open Cup. Ofeimu made 34 total appearances for the Eleven in 2024, including the team's playoff loss to Rhode Island FC and their historic participation in the semifinal of the Open Cup, defeating Major League Soccer (MLS) side Atlanta United FC in the process. On November 20, 2024, the club confirmed Ofeimu would remain with them for a second season.

Ofeimu scored his second league goal for Indy Eleven, and first in 2025, on May 28, 2025 in a 4–4 home draw against Hartford Athletic. His second goal of the season came on August 2 in a 1–3 home loss to Tampa Bay Rowdies.
