= List of USL transfers 2016 =

The following is a list of transfers for the teams of the United Soccer League, the third tier of the United States soccer pyramid, for the 2016 season. The transactions begin at the conclusion of the 2015 USL season and end after the championship match of the 2016 season. New players who are listed on a club's official roster but with no official announcement being made appear at the end of the list.

== Transfers ==
Date	Name	Last Club	Moving to	Mode of Transfer	Reference
October 7, 2015	(United States) Willie Hunt	(United States) Pittsburgh Riverhounds	(United States) Tampa Bay Rowdies	Free	
October 15, 2015	(United States) Mikey Ambrose	(United States) Austin Aztex	(United States) Orlando City B	Free	
October 15, 2015	(Republic of Ireland) Kyle Callan-McFadden	(England) Norwich City F.C.	(United States) Orlando City B	Free	
October 15, 2015	(United States) Tony Rocha	(United States) Austin Aztex	(United States) Orlando City B	Free	
October 31, 2015	(United States) Calle Brown	(United States) Pittsburgh Riverhounds	(United States) Houston Dynamo	Free	
November 10, 2015	(Canada) Ballou Jean-Yves Tabla	(Canada) Montreal Impact Academy	(Canada) FC Montreal	Free	
November 11, 2015	(Jamaica) Ryan Thompson	(United States) Pittsburgh Riverhounds	Released	Free	
November 12, 2015	(New Zealand) James Musa	(United States) Saint Louis FC	(New Zealand) Team Wellington	Free	
November 20, 2015	(United States) Christian Duke	(United States) Oklahoma City Energy FC	(United States) Swope Park Rangers	Free	
November 20, 2015	(Spain) Enric Vallès	(United States) Harrisburg City Islanders	(Norway) Sandefjord	Free	
December 2, 2015	(United States) Tyler Adams	(United States) New York Red Bulls II	(United States) New York Red Bulls	Free	
December 3, 2015	(Ghana) Derrick Jones	(United States) Philadelphia Union Academy	(United States) Bethlehem Steel FC	Free	
December 7, 2015	(United States) Austin Berry	(United States) Philadelphia Union	(United States) FC Cincinnati	Free	
December 7, 2015	(United States) Corben Bone	(United States) Philadelphia Union	(United States) FC Cincinnati	Free	
December 7, 2015	(United States) Mitch Hildebrandt	(United States) Minnesota United FC	(United States) FC Cincinnati	Free	
December 7, 2015	(United States) Pat McMahon	(United States) Rochester Rhinos	(United States) FC Cincinnati	Free	
December 7, 2015	(Panama) Francisco Narbón	(United States) James Madison Dukes	(United States) FC Cincinnati	Free	
December 7, 2015	(England) Paul Nicholson	(United States) Wilmington Hammerheads	(United States) FC Cincinnati	Free	
December 7, 2015	(United States) Tyler Polak	(United States) Minnesota United FC	(United States) FC Cincinnati	Free	
December 7, 2015	(United States) Eric Stevenson	Unattached	(United States) FC Cincinnati	Free	
December 7, 2015	(United States) Ross Tomaselli	(United States) Wilmington Hammerheads	(United States) FC Cincinnati	Free	
December 7, 2015	(United States) Kenney Walker	(United States) Los Angeles Galaxy	(United States) FC Cincinnati	Free	
December 7, 2015	(United States) Andrew Wiedeman	(Canada) Ottawa Fury FC	(United States) FC Cincinnati	Free	
December 9, 2015	(Canada) Daniel Fabrizi	(Canada) Toronto FC II	Released	Free	
December 9, 2015	(Canada) Mark-Anthony Kaye	(Canada) Toronto FC II	Released	Free	
December 9, 2015	(Canada) Massimo Mirabelli	(Canada) Toronto FC II	Released	Free	
December 9, 2015	(United States) Evan Newton	(United States) Oklahoma City Energy FC	(United States) Sacramento Republic FC	Free	
December 9, 2015	(Canada) Emeka Ononye	(Canada) Toronto FC II	Released	Free	
December 9, 2015	(Canada) Anthony Osorio	(Canada) TFC Academy	(Canada) Toronto FC II	Free	
December 9, 2015	(United States) Edwin Rivas	(Canada) Toronto FC II	Released	Free	
December 11, 2015	(Nigeria) Bolu Akinyode	(United States) New York Red Bulls II	(United States) Bethlehem Steel FC	Free	
December 11, 2015	(United States) Michael Daly	(United States) Sacramento Republic FC	(United States) Bethlehem Steel FC	Free	
December 11, 2015	(Liberia) Gabe Gissie	(United States) Sacramento Republic FC	(United States) Bethlehem Steel FC	Free	
December 15, 2015	(France) Yann Ekra	(United States) Harrisburg City Islanders	(United States) Charlotte Independence	Free	
December 15, 2015	(United States) Michael Mecham	(United States) UNC Wilmington Seahawks	(United States) Wilmington Hammerheads FC	Free	
December 16, 2015	(France) Clément Diop	(United States) LA Galaxy II	(United States) Los Angeles Galaxy	Free	
December 16, 2015	(Canada) Johnny Grant	(Canada) FC Montreal	(United States) Swope Park Rangers	Free	
December 16, 2015	(Jamaica) Dane Kelly	(United States) Charleston Battery	(United States) Swope Park Rangers	Free	
December 16, 2015	(United States) Zac Lubin	(United States) Tulsa Roughnecks FC	(United States) Swope Park Rangers	Free	
December 16, 2015	(United States) Kris Tyrpak	(United States) Austin Aztex	(United States) Swope Park Rangers	Free	
December 17, 2015	(Pakistan) Kaleemullah Khan	(United States) Sacramento Republic	(United States) Tulsa Roughnecks FC	Free	
December 17, 2015	(United States) Daniel Steres	(United States) LA Galaxy II	(United States) Los Angeles Galaxy	Free	
December 18, 2015	(United States) Charly Flores	(United States) Houston Dynamo Academy	(United States) Rio Grande Valley FC Toros	Free	
December 18, 2015	(Mexico) Luis Martinez	(United States) FC Tucson	(United States) Oklahoma City Energy FC	Free	
December 18, 2015	(England) Lewis Neal	(United States) Orlando City SC	(United States) Orlando City B	Free	
December 21, 2015	(Cameroon) Peabo Doue	(United States) Oklahoma City Energy FC	(United States) Wilmington Hammerheads	Free	
December 21, 2015	(United States) Mike da Fonte	(United States) New York Red Bulls II	(United States) Sacramento Republic	Free	
December 21, 2015	(Haiti) Derrick Etienne	(United States) New York Red Bulls II	(United States) New York Red Bulls	Free	
December 21, 2015	(United States) Brandon Miller	(United States) Rochester Rhinos	(United States) Orange County Blues FC	Free	
December 22, 2015	(United States) Ryan Richter	(Canada) Ottawa Fury FC	(United States) Bethlehem Steel FC	Free	
December 23, 2015	(United States) Lewis Hilton	(United States) Ocala Stampede	(United States) Charlotte Independence	Free	
December 23, 2015	(United States) Cody Mizell	(Iceland) Fram	(United States) Charlotte Independence	Free	
December 28, 2015	(Honduras) Danilo Acosta	(United States) Real Monarchs SLC	(United States) Real Salt Lake	Free	
December 28, 2015	(United States) Chandler Hoffman	(United States) Houston Dynamo	(United States) Louisville City FC	Free	
January 5, 2016	(United States) Andrew Brody	(United States) Orlando City U-23	(United States) Real Monarchs SLC	Free	
January 5, 2016	(Brazil) Vini Dantas	(United States) Pittsburgh Riverhounds	Released	Free	
January 5, 2016	(Togo) Alex Harlley	(United States) Atlanta Silverbacks	(United States) Pittsburgh Riverhounds	Free	
January 5, 2016	(Canada) Malik Johnson	(Canada) TFC Academy	(Canada) Toronto FC II	Free	
January 5, 2016	(United States) Colin Rolfe	(United States) Rochester Rhinos	(United States) Real Monarchs SLC	Free	
January 5, 2016	(Costa Rica) Mauricio Vargas	(United States) FC Wichita	(United States) Pittsburgh Riverhounds	Free	
January 6, 2016	(United States) Zak Boggs	(United States) Tampa Bay Rowdies	(United States) Pittsburgh Riverhounds	Free	
January 6, 2016	(United States) Corey Hertzog	(United States) Tampa Bay Rowdies	(United States) Pittsburgh Riverhounds	Free	
January 6, 2016	(United States) Alex Molano	(Sweden) Bodens BK	(United States) Swope Park Rangers	Free	
January 6, 2016	(Nigeria) Nansel Selbol	(United States) Sporting Kansas City Academy	(United States) Swope Park Rangers	Free	
January 6, 2016	(United States) Jacob VanCompernolle	(United States) Oklahoma City Energy FC	(United States) Swope Park Rangers	Free	
January 7, 2016	(Wales) Chad Bond	(United States) Tulsa Roughnecks FC	(United States) Saint Louis FC	Free	
January 7, 2016	(United States) Hunter Gilstrap	(United States) Carolina RailHawks	(United States) Pittsburgh Riverhounds	Free	
January 7, 2016	(Lesotho) Sunny Jane	(United States) Wilmington Hammerheads	(United States) Richmond Kickers	Free	
January 7, 2016	(United States) Karsten Smith	(United States) Fort Lauderdale Strikers	(United States) Pittsburgh Riverhounds	Free	
January 8, 2016	(United States) Samir Badr	(United States) Colorado Springs Switchbacks FC	(United States) Bethlehem Steel FC	Free	
January 8, 2016	(Mali) Oumar Ballo	(United States) Houston Dynamo	(United States) Swope Park Rangers	Free	
January 8, 2016	(Brazil) Ualefi	(Brazil) Corinthians	(United States) Swope Park Rangers	Free	
January 13, 2016	(Trinidad and Tobago) Trevin Caesar	(United States) Austin Aztex	(United States) Orange County Blues FC	Free	
January 13, 2016	(Canada) Michael Cox	(Portugal) Atlético CP	(United States) Orlando City B	Free	
January 13, 2016	(United States) Pierre da Silva	(United States) Orlando City U-23	(United States) Orlando City B	Free	
January 13, 2016	(Cameroon) William Eyang	(Sweden) Bodens BK	(United States) Orlando City B	Free	
January 13, 2016	(Canada) Mark-Anthony Kaye	(Canada) Toronto FC II	(United States) Louisville City FC	Free	
January 13, 2016	(Colombia) Jonathan Mendoza	(United States) Rochester Rhinos	(United States) Orlando City B	Free	
January 13, 2016	(United States) Craig Nitti	(Canada) Whitecaps FC 2	(United States) Orlando City B	Free	
January 13, 2016	(Cameroon) Marius Obekop	(United States) New York Red Bulls	(United States) Orlando City B	Free	
January 13, 2016	(United States) Dembakwi Yomba	(Spain) Atlético de Madrid	(United States) Orlando City B	Free	
January 15, 2016	(United States) George Davis IV	(United States) Richmond Kickers	(United States) Louisville City FC	Free	
January 15, 2016	(England) Jordan Rideout	(United States) Arizona United SC	(United States) Oklahoma City Energy FC	Free	
January 18, 2016	(United States) Patrick McLain	(United States) Sacramento Republic FC	(United States) Chicago Fire SC	Free	
January 18, 2016	(Serbia) Boris Zivanovic	(United States) Pittsburgh Riverhounds	(Slovenia) FC Koper	Free	
January 19, 2016	(United States) Ben Newnam	(United States) Pittsburgh Riverhounds	(United States) Louisville City FC	Free	
January 20, 2016	(Canada) Mark Anthony Gonzalez	(Canada) Toronto FC Academy	(United States) Swope Park Rangers	Free	
January 20, 2016	(United States) Cody Laurendi	(United States) Austin Aztex	(United States) Oklahoma City Energy FC	Free	
January 20, 2016	(United States) Josh Suggs	(United States) Orange County Blues FC	(United States) Colorado Springs Switchbacks FC	Free	
January 21, 2016	(Jamaica) Omar Cummings	(United States) San Antonio Scorpions	(United States) FC Cincinnati	Free	
January 21, 2016	(Australia) Harrison Delbridge	(United States) Portland Timbers 2	(United States) FC Cincinnati	Free	
January 21, 2016	(France) Antoine Hoppenot	(United States) Philadelphia Union	(United States) FC Cincinnati	Free	
January 21, 2016	(United States) Jimmy McLaughlin	(United States) Philadelphia Union	(United States) FC Cincinnati	Free	
January 21, 2016	(United States) Omar Mohamed	(United States) Jackson College Jets	(United States) FC Cincinnati	Free	
January 21, 2016	(Spain) Alvaro Anton Ripoll	(Spain) UD Alzira	(United States) FC Cincinnati	Free	
January 22, 2016	(Cameroon) Eric Ati	(United States) Charlotte Independence	(United States) Wilmington Hammerheads FC	Free	
January 22, 2016	(Nigeria) Akinjide Idowu	Nigeria Youth Soccer Academy	(United States) Portland Timbers 2	Free	
January 22, 2016	(Guyana) Emery Welshman	(United States) Real Monarchs SLC	(United States) Real Salt Lake	Free	
January 25, 2016	(United States) Chris Christian	(United States) Colorado Springs Switchbacks FC	(United States) Sacramento Republic FC	Free	
January 25, 2016	(United States) Tommy Meyer	(United States) Los Angeles Galaxy	(United States) Swope Park Rangers	Free	
January 26, 2016	(Switzerland) Tim Schmoll	(United States) New York Red Bulls U-23	(United States) New York Red Bulls II	Free	
January 28, 2016	(United States) Kyle Hyland	(United States) Indy Eleven	(United States) Oklahoma City Energy FC	Free	
January 28, 2016	(United States) Andrew Lubahn	(United States) Harrisburg City Islanders	(United States) Louisville City FC	Free	
January 28, 2016	(United States) Bryce Taylor	(United States) Austin Aztex	(United States) Wilmington Hammerheads	Free	
January 29, 2016	(United States) Nick Bibbs	(United States) Saint Louis FC	(United States) Bethlehem Steel FC	Free	
January 29, 2016	(Jamaica) Amoy Brown	(Jamaica) St. George's College	(United States) Bethlehem Steel FC	Free	
January 29, 2016	(Republic of Ireland) James Chambers	(Republic of Ireland) St Patrick's Athletic F.C.	(United States) Bethlehem Steel FC	Free	
January 29, 2016	(Liberia) Seku Conneh	(Netherlands) FC Oss	(United States) Bethlehem Steel FC	Free	
February 1, 2016	(Ghana) Evans Frimpong	(United States) Fort Lauderdale Strikers	(United States) Oklahoma City Energy FC	Free	
January 29, 2016	(United States) Kyle Greig	(United States) Oklahoma City Energy FC	(Canada) Whitecaps FC 2	Free	
January 29, 2016	(Canada) Josh Heard	(United States) Washington Huskies	(United States) Bethlehem Steel FC	Free	
January 29, 2016	(United States) Raymond Lee	(United States) Philadelphia Union	(United States) Bethlehem Steel FC	Free	
January 29, 2016	(United States) Andrew Ribeiro	(United States) Charlotte Independence	(United States) Orlando City B	Free	
January 29, 2016	(Scotland) Mark Ridgers	(Scotland) St Mirren F.C.	(United States) Orlando City B	Free	
January 29, 2016	(United States) Ken Tribbett	(United States) Harrisburg City Islanders	(United States) Bethlehem Steel FC	Free	
February 1, 2016	(Bosnia and Herzegovina) Dzenan Catic	(United States) Philadelphia Union	(United States) Rio Grande Valley FC Toros	Free	
February 1, 2016	(United States) Devin Perales	(United States) Austin Aztex	(United States) Rio Grande Valley FC Toros	Free	
February 2, 2016	(United States) Carlos Alvarez	(United States) Colorado Rapids	(United States) San Antonio	Free	
February 2, 2016	(United States) Paolo DelPiccolo	(United States) Charlotte Independence	(United States) Louisville City FC	Free	
February 2, 2016	(United States) Matt LaGrassa	(United States) Ventura County Fusion	(United States) Sacramento Republic FC	Free	
