= 2016 FC Cincinnati season =

FC Cincinnati
2016 season
- General manager: Jeff Berding
- Head coach: John Harkes
- Stadium: Nippert Stadium
- USL: Third, Eastern Conference
- USL Playoffs: Lost Round 1
- U.S. Open Cup: Third Round
- Top goalscorer: League: Sean Okoli (16); All: Sean Okoli (17)
- Highest home attendance: League: 24,376 (September 17 vs. Orlando); All: 35,061 (July 16 vs Crystal Palace)
- Lowest home attendance: League: 11,278 (Jun. 4 vs. Richmond); All: 8,668 (May 18 vs. Indy NPSL)
- Average home league attendance: League: 17,296; All: 17,834
Home colors	Away colors	Third colors

The 2016 FC Cincinnati season was the club's first season of existence, and their first in the United Soccer League, the third-tier of the American soccer pyramid. FC Cincinnati play in the Eastern Division of USL. On April 16, the club set the USL's regular season attendance record, with 20,497. They broke this record twice more later in their season, first on May 14 with 23,375 attendees, then again on September 17 with an attendance of 24,376. On July 20, with five games left, the club broke the USL's single season attendance record.

== Club ==
=== Coaching staff ===
Position	Staff
Head coach	(United States) John Harkes
Assistant coach	(United States) Ryan Martin
Goalkeeper coach	(United States) Jamie Starr

=== Roster ===
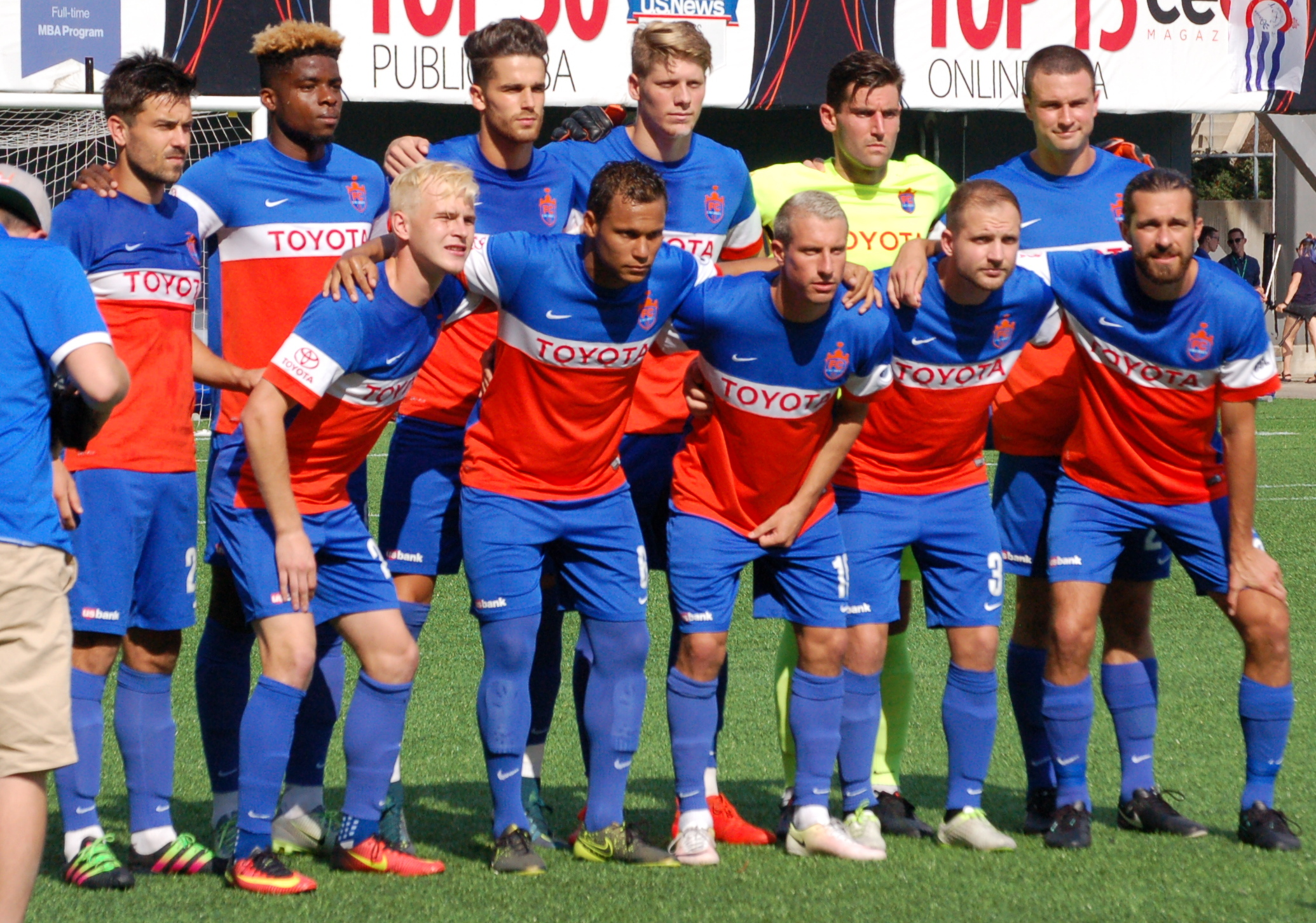
FCC's starting eleven pose for a photo prior to a match again Saint Louis FC on September 5.

No.	Name	Nationality	Positions	Date of birth (age)	Previous club
Goalkeepers
1	Mitch Hildebrandt	(United States)	GK	November 12, 1988 (age 37)	(United States) Minnesota United
27	Dan Williams	(United States)	GK	July 13, 1988 (age 37)	(United States) Cincinnati Saints
30	Dallas Jaye	(Guam)	GK	June 19, 1993 (age 32)	(United States) Xavier Musketeers
Defenders
3	Tyler Polak	(United States)	DF	May 13, 1992 (age 34)	(United States) Minnesota United
4	Harrison Delbridge	(Australia)	DF	March 15, 1992 (age 34)	(United States) Portland Timbers 2
12	Evan Lee	(United States)	DF	November 23, 1993 (age 32)	(United States) Ohio Wesleyan Battling Bishops
15	Pat McMahon	(United States)	DF	November 5, 1986 (age 39)	(United States) Rochester Rhinos
22	Austin Berry	(United States)	DF	October 6, 1988 (age 37)	(South Korea) FC Anyang
24	Derek Luke	(United States)	DF	May 28, 1993 (age 33)	(United States) Monmouth Hawks
Midfielders
2	Jamie Dell	(Canada)	MF	August 4, 1993 (age 32)	(United States) Carolina Railhawks
5	Ross Tomaselli	(United States)	MF	January 9, 1992 (age 34)	(United States) Wilmington Hammerheads
6	Kenney Walker	(United States)	MF	December 23, 1988 (age 37)	(United States) LA Galaxy
8	Paul Nicholson	(England)	MF	January 3, 1993 (age 33)	(United States) Wilmington Hammerheads
10	Eric Stevenson	(United States)	MF	August 30, 1990 (age 35)	(United States) New York Red Bulls
11	Álvaro Antón Ripoll	(Spain)	MF	May 18, 1994 (age 32)	(Spain) UD Alzira
13	Francisco Narbón	(Panama)	MF	February 11, 1995 (age 31)	(United States) James Madison Dukes
18	Omar Mohamed	(Somalia)	MF	January 1, 1997 (age 29)	(United States) Jackson Jets
19	Corben Bone	(United States)	MF	September 16, 1988 (age 37)	(United States) Wilmington Hammerheads
20	Jimmy McLaughlin	(United States)	MF	April 30, 1993 (age 33)	(United States) Philadelphia Union
25	Michael Millay	(United States)	MF	September 28, 1991 (age 34)	(United States) Cincinnati Bearcats
Forwards
7	Luke Spencer	(United States)	FW	November 28, 1990 (age 35)	(United States) Xavier Musketeers
9	Sean Okoli	(United States)	FW	February 3, 1993 (age 33)	(United States) New England Revolution
14	Omar Cummings	(Jamaica)	FW	July 13, 1982 (age 43)	(United States) San Antonio Scorpions
16	Casey Townsend	(United States)	FW	July 7, 1989 (age 36)	(United States) Wilmington Hammerheads
23	Andrew Wiedeman	(United States)	FW	August 22, 1989 (age 36)	(Canada) Ottawa Fury FC
29	Antoine Hoppenot	(France)	FW	November 23, 1990 (age 35)	(United States) Philadelphia Union

- Casey Townsend joined the team on September 8, 2016, after the season had already started
- Where a player has not declared an international allegiance, nation is determined by place of birth.
- Last updated: September 18, 2016

== Competitions ==
Win Draw Loss Postponed

=== USL ===
==== Results summary ====
Overall								Home						Away					
Pld	W	D	L	GF	GA	GD	Pts	W	D	L	GF	GA	GD	W	D	L	GF	GA	GD
22	12	6	4	32	20	+12	42	7	3	2	18	11	+7	5	3	2	14	9	+5

Last updated: August 13, 2016.
Source: USL

Matchday	1	2	3	4	5	6	7	8	9	10	11	12	13	14	15	16	17	18	19	20	21	22	23	24	25	26	27	28	29	30
Stadium	A	A	H	H	A	H	A	A	H	H	H	H	H	A	H	A	A	H	H	H	A	A	H	A	A	H	A	A	H	A
Result	L	W	W	L	W	D	W	D	W	W	D	W	W	D	W	L	W	L	W	D	W	D	D	L	L	W	W	D	W	W
Position	13	8	2	6	4	3	2	4	2	2	3	3	3	3	3	3	3	3	3	3	3	3	3	3	3	3	3	3	3	3

Updated to match(es) played on September 18, 2016. Source: USL
A = Away; H = Home; W = Win; D = Draw; L = Loss

==== Results table ====
March 26, 2016 1	Charleston Battery	1–0	FC Cincinnati	Charleston
7:30 p.m. EST	Lasso (yellow card) 47'; Garbanzo (yellow card) 55'; Portillo (yellow card) 90'; Williams 94'	USL Report; FCC Report; CHS Report	Tomaselli (yellow card) 71'	Stadium: MUSC Health Stadium; Attendance: 4,394; Referee: Leland Grant

April 3, 2016 2	Bethlehem Steel FC	1–2	FC Cincinnati	Bethlehem
3:00 p.m. EST	Akinyode (yellow card) 69' (yellow-red card) 80'; Ayuk 91'	USL Report; FCC Report; BTH Report	Wiedeman 25'; Okoli 34'; Walker (yellow card) 40'; Luke (yellow card) 90'	Stadium: Goodman Stadium; Attendance: 3,655; Referee: Jaroslaw Werel

April 9, 2016 3	FC Cincinnati	2–1	Charlotte Independence	Cincinnati
7:00 p.m. EST	Okoli 5'; Berry 53'; Hildebrandt (yellow card) 90+3'	USL Report; FCC Report; CLT Report	Estrada 53'; Ekra (yellow card) 82'	Stadium: Nippert Stadium; Attendance: 14,658; Referee: Nima Saghafi

April 16, 2016 4	FC Cincinnati	2–3	Louisville City FC	Cincinnati
7:00 p.m. EST	Berry 6'; Okoli (yellow card) 9'; Delbridge (yellow card) 31'; McMahon 90+2'	USL Report; FCC Report; LC Report	Hoffman 17' (pen.), 24', 33'; Reynolds (yellow card) 28' (yellow-red card) 40'; Montano (yellow card) 89'	Stadium: Nippert Stadium; Attendance: 20,497; Referee: Brandon Artis

April 24, 2016 5	Toronto FC II	1–2	FC Cincinnati	Toronto
4:00 p.m. EST	Edwards 45'	USL Report; FCC Report; TFC Report	Wiedeman 60'; Cummings 84'	Stadium: Ontario Soccer Centre; Attendance: 0 Referee: David Barrie

April 30, 2016 6	FC Cincinnati	1–1	Wilmington Hammerheads	Cincinnati
7:00 p.m. EST	Nicholson 48'	USL Report; FCC Report; WIL Report	Perone 24'; Michaud (yellow card) 40'; Miller (yellow card) 44'; Fairclough (yellow card) 58'	Stadium: Nippert Stadium; Attendance: 11,318; Referee: Donovan Noocha

May 4, 2016 7	Orlando City B	1–3	FC Cincinnati	Melbourne
7:30 p.m. EST	Obekop (yellow card) 43'; Róchez 53' (pen.); Ridgers (red card) 76'	USL Report; FCC Report; OCB Report	Walker 57'; Delbridge (yellow card) 72'; Okoli 78' (pen.); Bone (yellow card) 90+2'; Stevenson 90+2'	Stadium: Titan Soccer Complex; Attendance: 787; Referee: Jasmine Peralta

May 7, 2016 8	Harrisburg City Islanders	1–1	FC Cincinnati	Harrisburg
7:00 p.m. EST	Wheeler 17'; Hughes (yellow card) 86'; Barril (yellow card) 88'	USL Report; FCC Report; HCI Report	Hoppenot (yellow card) 40'; McLaughlin 81'	Stadium: Metro Bank Park; Attendance: 2,204; Referee: Dave Breckner

May 14, 2016 9	FC Cincinnati	1–0	Pittsburgh Riverhounds	Cincinnati
4:00 p.m. EST	McLaughlin 26'; Okoli (yellow card) 69'	USL Report; FCC Report; PIT Report	Moloto (yellow card) 40'; Okai (yellow card) 53'; Campbell (yellow card) 74'	Stadium: Nippert Stadium; Attendance: 23,375; Referee: Brandon Artis

May 28, 2016 11	FC Cincinnati	2–0	Harrisburg City Islanders	Cincinnati
7:00 p.m. EST	Wiedeman 19'; McMahon (yellow card) 78'; Okoli 90' (pen.)	USL Report	Wheeler (red card) 53'; Thomas (yellow card) 82'	Stadium: Nippert Stadium; Attendance: 16,097; Referee: Kevin Terry, Jr.
Note: Media related to FC Cincinnati vs. Harrisburg City Islanders, 2016-05-28 at Wikimedia Commons

June 4, 2016 12	FC Cincinnati	1–1	Richmond Kickers	Cincinnati
7:00 p.m. EST	Okoli (yellow card) 7' (goal) 13'	USL Report; FCC Report; RIC Report	Pittman (yellow card) 61'; Lee (yellow card) 68'; Ownby (yellow card) 90+3'; Roberts 90+4'	Stadium: Nippert Stadium; Attendance: 11,278; Referee: Luis Guardia

June 11, 2016 13	FC Cincinnati	2–1	FC Montreal	Cincinnati
7:00 p.m. EST	Walker (yellow card) 25'; Okoli 35' (pen.); Okoli 48'	USL Report; FCC Report; FCM Report	Kacher 90'	Stadium: Nippert Stadium; Attendance: 14,267; Referee: Rosendo Mendoza

June 18, 2016 14	FC Cincinnati	2–1	Toronto FC II	Cincinnati
7:00 p.m. EST	Okoli (yellow card) 56'; Delbridge 61'; Stevenson 62'	USL Report; FCC Report; TFC Report	Edwards 4'	Stadium: Nippert Stadium; Attendance: 19,112; Referee: Guido Gonzales, Jr.
Note: Media related to FC Cincinnati vs. Toronto FC II, 2016-06-18 at Wikimedia Commons

June 25, 2016 15	Louisville City FC	0–0	FC Cincinnati	Louisville
7:30 p.m. EST	Reynolds (yellow card) 45'	USL Report; FCC Report; LC Report	Delbridge (yellow card) 39'; Polak (yellow card) 41'; McMahon (yellow card) 61'	Stadium: Louisville Slugger Field; Attendance: 10,062; Referee: Brandon Artis

July 2, 2016 16	FC Cincinnati	1–0	Bethlehem Steel FC	Cincinnati
6:00 p.m. EST	McLaughlin 69'	USL Report; FCC Report; BTH Report	Heard (yellow card) 47'; Daly (yellow card) 59'; Conceição (yellow card) 63'	Stadium: Nippert Stadium; Attendance: 17,380; Referee: Michael Lavergne

July 6, 2016 17	Rochester Rhinos	2–1	FC Cincinnati	Rochester
7:05PM EST	Garzi 34'; Dos Santos 65' (pen.)	USL Report; FCC Report; ROC Report	Delbridge (yellow card) 64'; Okoli 75' (pen.)	Stadium: Rochester Rhinos Stadium; Attendance: 3,023; Referee: Edvin Jurisevic

July 9, 2016 18	St. Louis FC	1–2	FC Cincinnati	St. Louis
8:30 p.m. EST	Ambersley (yellow card) 25'; Tshuma 85'; Barklage (yellow card) 90+3'	USL Report; FCC Report; STL Report	Cummings 8'; McMahon (yellow card) 58'; Bone (yellow card) 58'; Stevenson 78'	Stadium: World Wide Technology Soccer Park; Attendance: 0 Referee: Malik Badawi

July 20, 2016 19	FC Cincinnati	1–2	New York Red Bulls II	Cincinnati
7:00 p.m. EST	Polak (yellow card) 32'; Nicholson (yellow card) 43'; McLaughlin 61'	USL Report; FCC Report; NYR Report	Plewa (yellow card) 35'; Flemmings (yellow card) 43'; Abang (yellow card) 77'; Bilyeu 82'; Valot 86'	Stadium: Nippert Stadium; Attendance: 16,127; Referee: Rosendo Mendoza
Note: Media related to FC Cincinnati vs. New York Red Bulls II, 2016-07-20 at Wikimedia Commons

July 23, 2016 20	FC Cincinnati	2–0	Louisville City FC	Cincinnati
4:00 p.m. EST	Wiedeman 39'; Berry (yellow card) 45'; Okoli 59'; Bone (yellow card) 72'	USL Report; FCC Report; LC Report	Lubahn (yellow card) 13'; Abend (yellow card) 30'; Quinn (yellow card) 50'	Stadium: Nippert Stadium; Attendance: 20,151; Referee: Alex Chilowicz

July 30, 2016 21	FC Cincinnati	1–1	Charleston Battery	Cincinnati
7:00 p.m. EST	Cummings 51'; Delbridge (yellow card) 68'	USL Report; FCC Report; CHS Report	Lasso (yellow card) 63'; Cordovés 70'	Stadium: Nippert Stadium; Attendance: 19,229; Referee: Marcos Deoliveira

August 3, 2016 22	FC Montreal	0–2	FC Cincinnati	Montreal
2:00 p.m. EST	Geffrard (yellow card) 37'; Charbonneau (yellow card) 56' (yellow-red card) 81'; Onkony (yellow card) 88'	USL Report; FCC Report; FCM Report	Tomaselli (yellow card) 26'; Okoli 34'; McMahon (yellow card) 53'; Okoli 70'	Stadium: Complexe sportif Claude-Robillard; Attendance: 78; Referee: Marie-Soleil Beaudoin

August 13, 2016 23	Richmond Kickers	1–1	FC Cincinnati	Richmond
7:00 p.m. EST	Jane 63'; Callahan (yellow card) 80'; Troyer (yellow card) 85'	USL Report; FCC Report; RIC Report	Okoli (yellow card) 78'; Wiedeman 81'	Stadium: City Stadium; Attendance: 3,093; Referee: Jorge Ramirez

August 24, 2016 24	FC Cincinnati	1–1	Rochester Rhinos	Cincinnati
7:00 p.m. EST	Berry 27'; McLaughlin (yellow card) 54'; Stevenson (yellow card) 80'	USL Report; FCC Report; ROC Report	Forbes (yellow card) 22'; Santos 41'; Fall (yellow card) 50'	Stadium: Nippert Stadium; Attendance: 14,157; Referee: Leland Grant
Note: Media related to FC Cincinnati vs. Rochester Rhinos, 2016-08-24 at Wikimedia Commons

August 28, 2016 25	New York Red Bulls II	2–0	FC Cincinnati	Harrison
5:30 p.m. EST	Long (yellow card) 11'; Allen 14' (pen.); Etienne 90+1' (pen.); Powder (red card) 90+2'	FCC Report	Hildebrandt (red card) 11'; McMahon (yellow card) 59'; Okoli (yellow card) 89'	Stadium: Red Bulls Arena; Attendance: 2,414; Referee: Allen Chapman

August 31, 2016 10	Charlotte Independence	3–2	FC Cincinnati	Charlotte
7:00 p.m. EST	Enzo Martinez 10', 18'; Alex Martinez (yellow card) 55'; Enzo Martinez (yellow card) 64'; Duckett (yellow card) 75' (yellow-red card) 78'; Hassan (yellow card) 90'; Herrera 84'	Announcement; FCC Report; CLT Report	Wiedeman 14'; Ripoll (yellow card) 30'; Bone (yellow card) 34'; Berry (yellow card) 53'; Walker (yellow card) 68'; Okoli 60'	Stadium: Ramblewood Soccer Complex; Attendance: 1,035; Referee: Kevin Broadley

September 5, 2016 26	FC Cincinnati	2–1	St. Louis FC	Cincinnati
4:30 p.m. EST	Okoli (yellow card) 57'; Okoli 83', 90' (pen.)	USL Report; FCC Report; STL Report	Lurie (yellow card) 61'; Roberts (yellow card) 75'; Doddy 85'	Stadium: Nippert Stadium; Attendance: 17,415; Referee: Joshua Brooks
Note: Media related to FC Cincinnati vs. Saint Louis FC, 2016-09-05 at Wikimedia Commons

September 11, 2016 27	Wilmington Hammerheads FC	0–2	FC Cincinnati	Wilmington
3:00 p.m. EST	Mecham (yellow card) 87'	FCC Report; WIL Report	Okoli 29'; McMahon (yellow card) 58'; Wiedeman 63'	Stadium: Legion Stadium; Attendance: 1,074; Referee: Kevin Broadley

September 14, 2016 28	Pittsburgh Riverhounds	0–0	FC Cincinnati	Pittsburgh
7:00 p.m. EST	Martínez (yellow card) 45'	FCC Report; PIT Report	Walker (yellow card) 59'; Polak (yellow card) 86'	Stadium: Highmark Stadium; Attendance: 1,062; Referee: Charles Murphy

September 17, 2016 29	FC Cincinnati	1–0	Orlando City B	Cincinnati
7:00 p.m. EST	Stevenson (yellow card) 48'; Delbridge (yellow card) 51'; McMahon (yellow card) 61'; Townsend 81'; Townsend (yellow card) 90'	USL Report; FCC Report; OCB Report		Stadium: Nippert Stadium; Attendance: 24,376; Referee: Aaron Hernandez
Note: Media related to FC Cincinnati vs. Orlando City B, 2016-09-17 at Wikimedia Commons

September 24, 2016 30	Pittsburgh Riverhounds	0–1	FC Cincinnati	Pittsburgh
7:00 p.m. EST	Hertzog (yellow card) 35'	FCC Report; PIT Report	Okoli 30'; Polak (yellow card) 72'	Stadium: Highmark Stadium; Attendance: 3,157; Referee: Georgios Zervos

==== Standings ====
Pos	Team	Pld	W	D	L	GF	GA	GD	Pts	Qualification
1	New York Red Bulls II (C, X)	30	21	6	3	61	21	+40	69	Conference Playoffs
2	Louisville City FC	30	17	9	4	52	27	+25	60	Conference Playoffs
3	FC Cincinnati	30	16	8	6	41	27	+14	56	Conference Playoffs
4	Rochester Rhinos	30	13	12	5	38	25	+13	51	Conference Playoffs
5	Charlotte Independence	30	14	8	8	48	29	+19	50	Conference Playoffs

Source: 2016 USL Standings
Rules for classification: 1) total wins; 2) total goal differential; 3) total goals scored; 4) points earned against top four Conference finishers; 5) disciplinary points; 6) coin toss or drawing of lots
(C) Champions; (X) Regular Season League Champion

=== U.S. Open Cup ===
May 18 Second round	FC Cincinnati	2–1	Indy Eleven NPSL	Cincinnati
7:00 p.m. EST	Cummings 36' (pen.); McLaughlin 61'	Report	Mitchell 39'	Stadium: Nippert Stadium; Referee: Aaron Mitchell

June 1 Third round	Tampa Bay Rowdies	1–0	FC Cincinnati	St. Petersburg, Florida
7:00 p.m. EST	Hristov 11'	Report		Stadium: Al Lang Stadium; Attendance: 3,455; Referee: Rubiel Vazquez

== Friendlies ==
February 21, 2016	KR	2–2	FC Cincinnati	Bradenton, Florida
6:00 p.m. EDT	Pálmason 58'; Beck 71' (pen.)	Report	Spencer 76'; Bone 88'	Stadium: IMG Academy

February 24, 2016	New York City FC	1–2	FC Cincinnati	Bradenton, Florida
6:00 p.m. EDT	McNamara 89'	Report	Spencer 88'; Delbridge 90+1'	Stadium: IMG Academy

February 27, 2016	HB Køge	0–4	FC Cincinnati	Bradenton, Florida
6:00 p.m. EDT	Hansen (red card) 58'	Report	Wiedeman 58' (pen.), 77'; McLaughlin 65'; Dell 90'	Stadium: IMG Academy

March 12, 2016	Indy Eleven	1–1	FC Cincinnati	Indianapolis
11:00 a.m. EDT	Zayed 85'	Report	Spencer 64'	Stadium: Key Stadium

March 18, 2016	FC Cincinnati	2–0	Xavier University	Cincinnati
7:00 p.m. EDT		Report	McLaughlin 22'; Okoli 50'	Stadium: Corcoran Field

July 16, 2016	FC Cincinnati	0–2	Crystal Palace F.C.	Cincinnati
7:00 p.m. EST		Report	Mutch 8'; Zaha 63'	Stadium: Nippert Stadium; Attendance: 35,061

== Statistics ==
=== Appearances ===
No.	Pos.	Name	USL	USL Playoffs	U.S. Open Cup	Total
1	GK	(United States) Mitch Hildebrandt	30	-	1	31
2	MF	(Canada) Jamie Dell	-	-	1	1
3	DF	(United States) Tyler Polak	20 (1)	-	1	21 (1)
4	DF	(Australia) Harrison Delbridge	19 (1)	-	1	20 (1)
5	MF	(United States) Ross Tomaselli	10 (5)	-	1 (1)	12 (6)
6	MF	(United States) Kenney Walker	18	-	1	19
7	FW	(United States) Luke Spencer	0 (8)	-	1	1 (8)
8	MF	(England) Paul Nicholson	13 (2)	-	2	14 (2)
9	FW	(United States) Sean Okoli	21	-	1	22
10	MF	(United States) Eric Stevenson	9 (7)	-	1	10 (7)
12	DF	(United States) Evan Lee	1 (9)	-	1 (1)	2 (10)
13	MF	(Panama) Francisco Narbón	0 (4)	-	1	1 (4)
14	MF	(Jamaica) Omar Cummings	6 (9)	-	1 (1)	7 (10)
15	DF	(United States) Pat McMahon	20	-	1 (1)	21 (1)
18	MF	(Somalia) Omar Mohamed	1 (13)	-	1	2 (13)
19	DF	(United States) Corben Bone	21	-	1	22
20	MF	(United States) Jimmy McLaughlin	21	-	1 (1)	22 (1)
22	DF	(United States) Austin Berry	9 (1)	-	-	9 (1)
23	FW	(United States) Andrew Wiedeman	18 (3)	-	1	19 (3)
24	DF	(United States) Derek Luke	2 (17)	-	1	3 (17)
29	FW	(France) Antoine Hoppenot	1 (9)	-	1 (1)	2 (10)
30	GK	(Guam) Dallas Jaye	0 (1)	-	1	1 (2)

- Last updated: August 3, 2016

=== Goals ===
No.	Pos.	Name	USL	USL Playoffs	U.S. Open Cup	Total
4	DF	(Australia) Harrison Delbridge	1	-	-	1
6	MF	(United States) Kenney Walker	1	-	-	1
8	MF	(England) Paul Nicholson	1	-	-	1
9	FW	(United States) Sean Okoli	16	-	-	16
10	MF	(United States) Eric Stevenson	3	1	-	4
14	FW	(Jamaica) Omar Cummings	3	-	1	4
15	DF	(United States) Pat McMahon	1	-	-	1
20	MF	(United States) Jimmy McLaughlin	4	-	1	5
22	DF	(United States) Austin Berry	3	-	-	3
23	FW	(United States) Andrew Wiedeman	7	-	-	7

- Last updated: October 5, 2016

=== Clean Sheets ===
No.	Pos.	Name	Matches Played	Clean Sheet %	USL	USL Playoffs	U.S. Open Cup	Total
1	GK	(United States) Mitch Hildebrandt	30	37%	11	-	0	11
27	GK	(United States) Dan Williams	-	-	-	-	-	-
30	GK	(Guam) Dallas Jaye	3	33%	1	-	0	1

- Last updated: October 5, 2016
