= Luke (surname) =

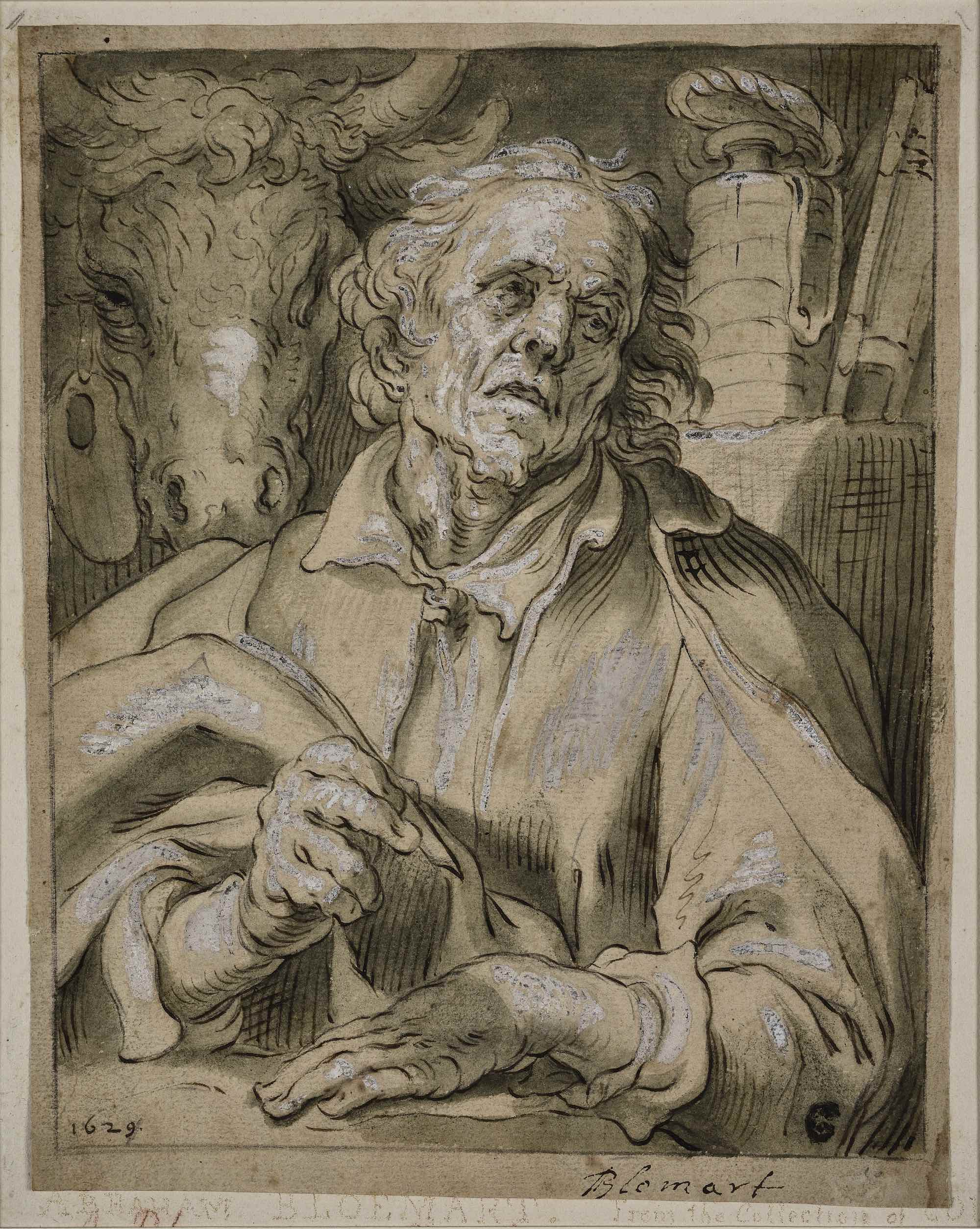
- Image of Luke the Evangelist by Abraham Bloemaert
- Pronunciation: /luːk/
- Gender: Masculine
- Name day: 18 October

Origin
- Origin: Latin
- Meaning: "Light"

Other names
- Related names: Lucius, Luc, Luca, Lucas, Lukas, Lucy, Lucinda, Lukasz,

Luke /ˈluːk/ is a surname.

The name Luke is the English form and the diminutive of the Latin name Lucas. It is derived from the Latin name Lucius, and it either means "the bright one" or "the one born at dawn," or "the great Lucius." It could also be a shortened form of the Latin name. Lucius likely derives from Latin word lux (gen. lucis), meaning "light" (<PIE *leuk-, "brightness"), related to the Latin verb lucere ("to shine"). Another proposed etymology is derivation from Etruscan Lauchum (or Lauchme) meaning "king," which was more directly transferred into Latin as Lucumo. The frequently-stated translation of Λουκᾶς as "man from Lucania" does not appear supported by reliable sources.

People with the surname include:

- Alan Luke (born 1959), British speed skater
- Alex Luke, American music executive
- Alexandra Luke (1901–1967), Canadian artist
- Alfred James Luke (1871–1920), Australian politician
- Arthur Luke (1923–1996), Australian rules footballer
- Austin Luke (born 1994), American basketball player
- Benny Luke (1939–2013), French-American actor
- Billy Luke (1890–1992), English footballer
- Charles Luke (politician) (1857–1941), mayor of Wellington, New Zealand
- Charles A. Luke (born 1961), American educator, author, nonprofit leader and consultant
- Charles Luke (Australian footballer) (1915–1998), Footscray VFL footballer
- Charles Luke (English footballer) (1909–1983), Huddersfield Town association footballer
- Cole Luke (born 1995), American football player
- David Luke (1921–2005), German scholar
- Dennick Luke (born 2001), Dominican runner
- Derek Luke (born 1974), American actor
- Derek Luke (soccer) (born 1993), American soccer player
- Desiree Luke, Trinidadian cricketer
- Desmond Luke (1935–2021), Sierra Leonian politician
- Doug Luke (1929–2015), English photographer
- Émile F. Luke (1895–1980), Sierra Leonian scouting official
- Eric Luke, American writer
- Frank Luke (1897–1918), American fighter pilot
- Fred Luke (born 1946), American athlete
- Frederick Luke (1895–1983), English army officer
- Gabriel Luke (born 1969), American sprinter
- Gadam Samuel Luke (1920–2000), Indian bishop
- Gail Luke (born 1963), Australian hurdler
- George Luke (footballer, born 1933) (1933–2010), English football left-winger
- George Luke (footballer, born 1948), English football midfielder
- Harry Luke (1884–1969), British colonial official
- Horace Luke (born 1970), Taiwanese entrepreneur
- Iain Luke (born 1951), Scottish politician
- Issac Luke (born 1987), New Zealand rugby league footballer
- Jan Lüke (born 1989), German rower
- Jemima Luke (1813–1906), English writer
- Jeremy Luke (born 1977), American actor
- John A. Luke Jr., chief executive officer of MeadWestvaco
- John Luke (artist) (1906–1975), Irish artist
- John Luke (English politician) (1563–1638), English politician who sat in the House of Commons from 1610 to 1611
- John Luke (New Zealand politician) (1858–1931), New Zealand politician
- Jordan Luke (born 1993/1994), Australian rugby union footballer
- Josef Lüke (1899–1948), German footballer
- Kenneth Luke (1896–1971), Australian manufacturer
- Keye Luke (1904–1991), Chinese-American actor
- Lauren Luke (born 1981), English makeup artist
- Matt Luke (American football) (born 1976), American college football coach and former player
- Matt Luke (baseball) (born 1971), American former Major League Baseball player
- Matthew Luke (died 1722), Italian pirate in the Caribbean
- Ming Luke, American conductor
- Monte Luke (1885–1962), Australian photographer
- Ned Luke (born 1958), American actor
- Noel Luke (born 1964), English footballer
- Oliver Luke (1574–1651), English politician
- Onofiok Luke (born 1978), Nigerian politician
- Pearl Luke (born 1958), Canadian novelist
- Peter Luke (1919–1995), British writer
- Richard Luke (1948–2014), Australian rules footballer
- Robin Luke (born 1942), American singer
- Samuel Luke (1603–1670), English politician
- Soni Luke (born 1996), Australian rugby league footballer
- Steve Luke (born 1953), American football player
- Tamara Luke (born 1988), Australian rules footballer
- Theresa Luke (born 1967), Canadian rower
- Thomas Luke (1891–1935), British pilot
- Timothy Luke (born 1951), American professor
- Tony Luke (born 1985), Indian actor
- Tony Luke Jr. (born 1962), American restaurateur
- Wing Luke (1925–1965), Chinese-American politician
- Yudell Luke (1918–1983), American mathematician

== See also ==
- Luke (disambiguation)
- Luke (given name)
