= Charles Luke =

Charles Luke may refer to:

- Charles Luke (politician) (1857–1941), mayor of Wellington, New Zealand
- Charles A. Luke (born 1961), American educator, author, nonprofit leader and consultant
- Charles Luke (Australian footballer) (1915–1998), Footscray VFL footballer
- Charles Luke (English footballer) (1909–1983), Huddersfield Town association footballer

== See also ==
- Charlie Luke (disambiguation)
