= Luki =

Luki may refer to:

- Lüki (Iteu), community of Abram in Romania
- Pierre Louki, a French actor and singer/songwriter.
- Velikiye Luki, a city in the southern part of Pskov Oblast, Russia.
- FC Luki-SKIF Velikiye Luki, a Russian football team from Velikiye Luki
- Luki (crater), an impact crater on Mars

== See also ==
- Luke (disambiguation)
- Lukis (disambiguation)
- Lucas (disambiguation)
