= Charlie Luke =

Charlie Luke may refer to:

- Charlie Luke (Australian footballer) (1915–1998), Footscray VFL footballer
- Charlie Luke (English footballer) (1909–1983), Huddersfield Town association footballer

== See also ==
- Charles Luke (disambiguation)
- Luke (name)
