= Álvaro Antón =

Álvaro Antón may refer to:

- Álvaro Antón (footballer, born 1983), Spanish footballer
- Álvaro Antón (footballer, born 1994), Spanish footballer
