= Lukis =

Lukis may refer to:

- Adrian Lukis, English actor
- Francis William Fellowes Lukis, senior commander in the Royal Australian Air Force
- Frederick Lukis, Channel Islands archaeologist, naturalist, collector and antiquarian
- Mollie Lukis, Australian archivist and promoter of women's rights.
- Sir Charles Pardey Lukis (1857–1917), usually known as Sir Pardey Lukis, Director-General of the Indian Medical Service (1910–1917)
- Sami Lukis, Australian television and radio personality
- William Collings Lukis, British antiquarian, archeologist and polymath.

== See also ==
- Luke (disambiguation)
- Lucas (disambiguation)
