= Cedric Edwards =

British WWI flying ace (1899–1918)

Cedric George Edwards
- Born: 5 June 1899; Hampstead, London, England
- Died: 27 August 1918 (aged 19); Vicinity of Jigsaw Wood, France
- Burial place: Arras Flying Services Memorial, Pas de Calais, France
- Military career
- Allegiance: United Kingdom
- Branch: Royal Navy; Royal Air Force
- Service years: 1917–1918
- Rank: Lieutenant
- Units: No. 12 Squadron RNAS; No. 9 Squadron RNAS/No. 209 Squadron RAF
- Conflicts: World War I
- Awards: Distinguished Flying Cross

Lieutenant Cedric George Edwards DFC (5 June 1899 – 27 August 1918) was a British World War I flying ace credited with seven aerial victories.

== Biography ==
Edwards was born in Hampstead, London, the son of John Frederick Edwards (1857–1940) and Elizabeth Ann (née Walton) (1865–1945).

He initially joined the Royal Naval Air Service as a probationary temporary flight officer on 7 September 1917, being commissioned as a temporary flight sub-lieutenant on 27 November 1917. After training with No. 12 Squadron, he was posted to No. 9 Squadron, which became No. 209 Squadron RAF on 1 April 1918.

Flying a Sopwith Camel, between 11 April and 11 August 1918 he accounted for seven enemy aircraft destroyed or driven down out of control; four solo and three shared with other pilots, including Roy Brown, Robert Foster and Thomas Luke.

Edwards was killed on 27 August 1918 when his aircraft was shot down by anti-aircraft fire near Jigsaw Wood, France. Initially reported as "missing", his death was later confirmed, although his body was never recovered. He is commemorated at the Arras Flying Services Memorial, Pas de Calais, France.

His award of the Distinguished Flying Cross was gazetted posthumously on 20 September 1918. His citation read:

Lieutenant Cedric George Edwards.
The fearlessness and disregard of danger displayed by this officer in attacking enemy troops, etc., at low altitudes is most marked, and worthy of the highest praise. On one occasion in an attack on an aerodrome, to enable him to fire on the hangars he descended so low that the wheels of his machine touched the ground. He has in air combats destroyed three hostile aircraft.
