= Luke =

Luke may refer to:

== People ==
- Luke (given name), including a list of people and fictional characters with the name
- Luke (surname), including a list of people with the name

== Christianity ==
- Gospel of Luke, a Christian Gospel
- Luke the Evangelist, author of the Gospel of Luke

== Music ==
- Luke (album), by Steve Lukather
- Luke (French band)
- Luke Records, a record label
- Dr. Luke, American songwriter and record producer Łukasz Sebastian Gottwald (born 1973)
- Uncle Luke, also known as Luke, American rapper Luther Roderick Campbell (born 1960)
- "LUKE", a song by Susumu Hirasawa from Glory Wars

== Places ==
- Luke (Čajniče), a village in the municipality of Čajniče, Bosnia and Herzegovina
- Luke (Hadžići), a village in Sarajevo Canton, Bosnia and Herzegovina
- Luke (Pale), a village in the municipality of Pale, Bosnia and Herzegovina
- Luke, Vareš, a village in the municipality of Vareš, Bosnia and Herzegovina
- Luke, Estonia, a village in Nõo Parish, Tartu County, Estonia
  - Luke Manor
- Luke, North Macedonia, a village in Kriva Palanka
- Luke (Ivanjica), a village in the municipality of Ivanjica, Serbia
- Luke, Maryland, a town in the United States
- Luke, an oldentime English overname of the Dutch placename Luik, now known as Liege, Belgium; also, an English word for goods such as velvet and iron from Luik
- Luke Air Force Base, Glendale, Arizona, United States
- Luke Field, Ford Island, Hawaii, United States, name of the Army Air Force airfield from 1919 to c. 1939
- Luke railway station, Luke, Manitoba, Canada

== Other uses ==
- Luke, Natural Resources Institute Finland (Luonnonvarakeskus)
- Luke, a 1970s British boutique run by Gordon Luke Clarke
- Baron Luke, a title in the Peerage of the United Kingdom
- "Luke" (Street Level Hero), an episode of Street Level Hero

== See also ==
- Louka (disambiguation)
- Luka (disambiguation)
- Saint Luke (disambiguation)
