= Nashville Ballet =

Ballet company in Tennessee, United States

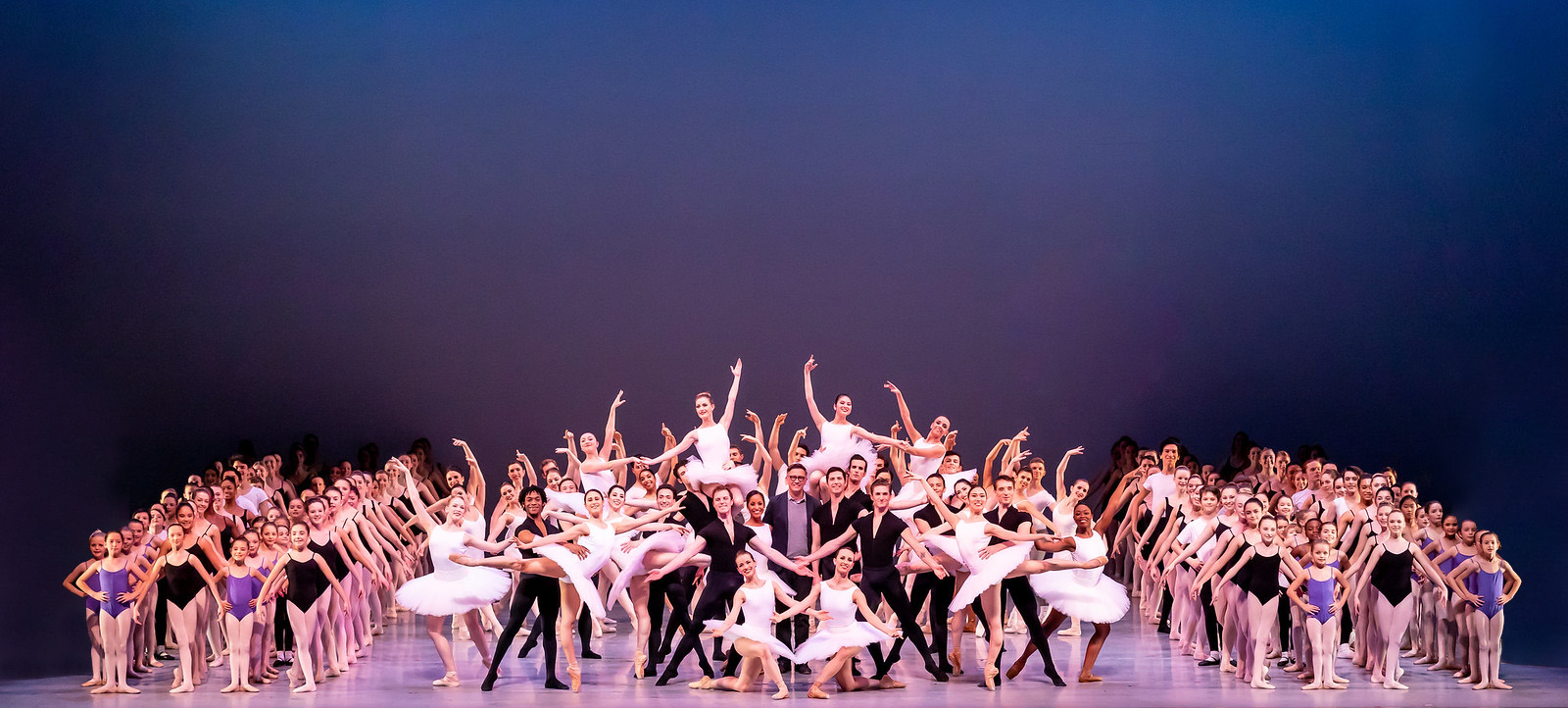
Nashville Ballet

Nashville Ballet is a professional ballet company in Tennessee. Founded in 1986 and based in Nashville, Tennessee, it presents a repertoire of classic and contemporary works by a variety of choreographers, including Artistic Director Nick Mullikin.

== History ==
In 1974, a group of dancers and teachers opened the Dancers Studio, which offered ballet and other dance classes. After several productions following their 1981 debut, the group became the Nashville City Ballet, which became a professional performance company in 1986. Dane LaFontsee was the first artistic director. A year later, the company was renamed to Nashville Ballet.

After serving as rehearsal director, Paul Vasterling was appointed Nashville Ballet Artistic Director in 1998.

In 1999, the group traveled abroad for the first time to perform in Basel, Switzerland. Among other international tours, they went to Buenos Aires and other cities across Argentina.

In 2000, the company purchased and renovated its current home on 3630 Redmon Street.

Nashville Ballet reimagined The Nutcracker as Nashville’s Nutcracker by Paul Vasterling in 2008.

In 2009, the Company debuted their first original production of Carmina Burana.

In 2014, Nashville Ballet launched its ELEVATE Capital Campaign to help expand their facilities. Following a large fundraising initiative, Nashville Ballet completed $5.2 million worth of expansions to the Martin Center. Following the initiative, Nashville Ballet completed $5.2 million worth of expansions to the Martin Center.

Created by the male company members and staff, Nashville Ballet launched a tuition free Young Men’s Scholarship Program in 2016.

In 2017, the group performed at The Kennedy Center, In 2019, Paul Vasterling's debuted Lucy Negro Redux on the Company and was featured in the New York Times.

In 2020, For the first time in the company's history, Nashville Ballet staged and filmed Nashville’s Nutcracker for television. The performance made its televised premiere on NewsChannel 5 WTVF, which received two TELLY Awards and an Emmy Award.

== Performances ==
Nashville Ballet presents five to seven mainstage performances each year. The company performs at and is the resident ballet company at the Tennessee Performing Arts Center in downtown Nashville.

Nashville Ballet has performed at The Kennedy Center in Washington, D.C. in 2017 and at the Chautauqua Institution in Chautauqua, NY in 2018. The company has performed internationally in Basel, Switzerland, and Buenos Aires, Argentina. In the spring of 2022, the company will tour Paul Vasterling’s Lucy Negro Redux to Denver, Colorado, Santa Fe, New Mexico, Kansas City, Missouri, and Norfolk, Virginia.

Vasterling’s 2019 Lucy Negro Redux in collaboration with Rhiannon Giddens examined themes of otherness, equality, and self-worth; it was dubbed a “Nashville miracle” by The New York Times.

== Music director ==
In 2022, Nashville Ballet named frequent guest conductor Ming Luke as music director and principal conductor.
