= Ming Luke =

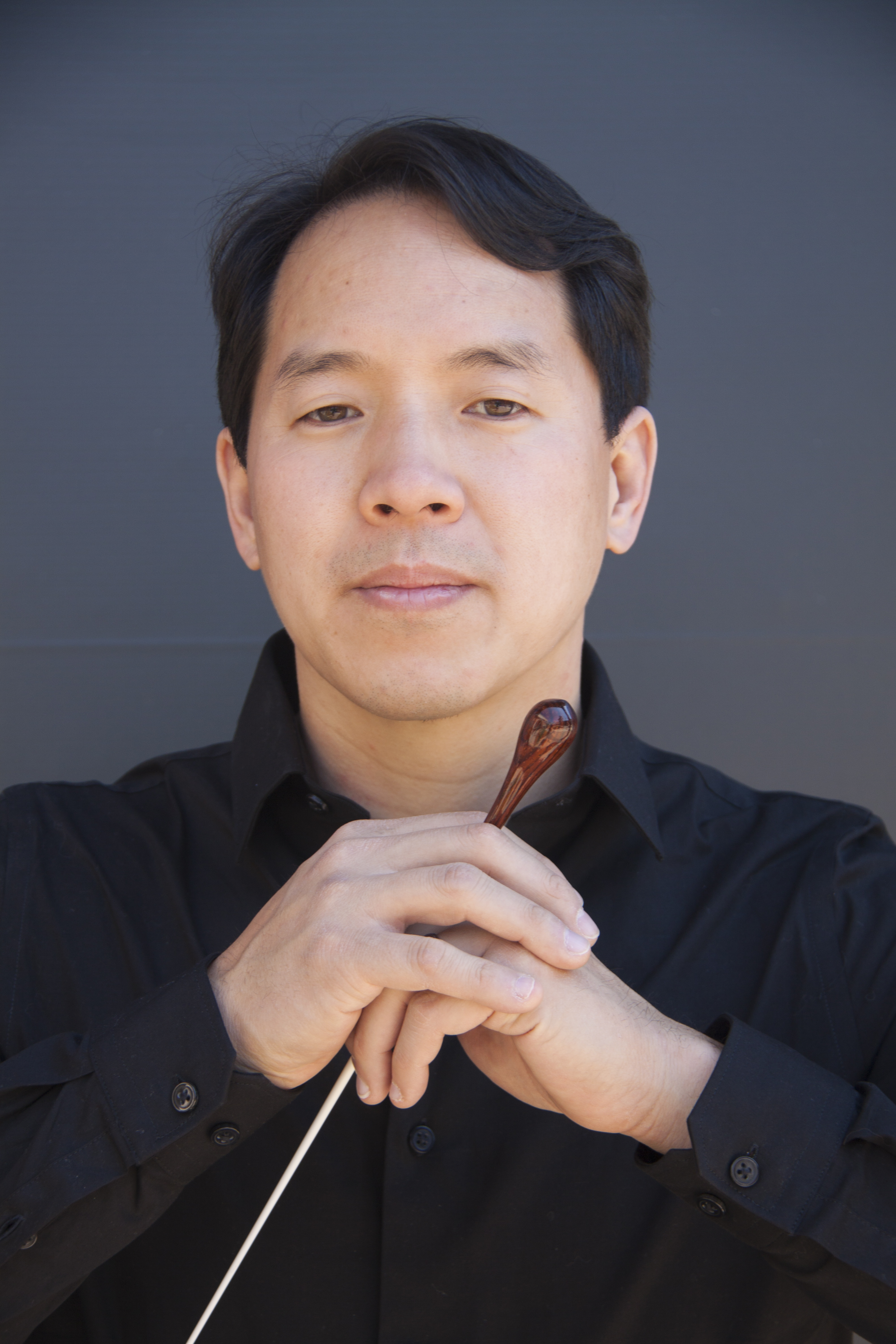

Background information
- Occupation: Conductor
- Website: mingluke.com

Ming Luke is an American conductor who serves as the music director and principal conductor for the Royal Winnipeg Ballet, Nashville Ballet, Principal Guest Conductor for the San Francisco Ballet, Las Cruces Symphony, Merced Symphony, and Berkeley Community Chorus and Orchestra.

Luke has conducted with a variety of orchestras, ballets, and operas. He has published several papers in music education, and has written and performed education concerts, including over 150 at the Berkeley Symphony, where he serves as Director and Conductor of Education Programs. He has collaborated with the TED-Ed for a variety of music education videos.

Luke graduated from Westminster Choir College in 2000 with a double major in music education and piano pedagogy and later attended Carnegie Mellon University, where he attained an MFA in conducting.
