= Louka =

Louka may refer to:

== Places ==
=== Czech Republic ===
- Louka (Blansko District), a municipality and village in the South Moravian Region
- Louka (Hodonín District), a municipality and village in the South Moravian Region
- Louka u Litvínova, a municipality and village in the Ústí nad Labem Region
- Louka, a village and part of Jemnice in the Vysočina Region
- Louka, a village and part of Nová Ves (Sokolov District) in the Karlovy Vary Region
- Louka, a village and part of Vojníkov in the South Bohemian Region
- Louka, a village and part of Vrbatův Kostelec in the Pardubice Region
- Nová louka, a nature reserve in the Liberec Region

=== Estonia ===
- Lõuka, a village in Pärnu County

== Name ==
=== Given name ===
- Louka Katseli

=== Surname ===
- Loukas Louka (athlete) (born 1945), Cypriot shot putter
- Loukas Louka (footballer) (born 1978), Cypriot footballer
- Liasos Louka (born 1980), Cypriot footballer
- Marios Louka (born 1982), Cypriot footballer
- Ilias Louka (born 1974), Cypriot shot putter
- Mikhalis Louka (born 1970), Cypriot shot putter
