= Antoine Hoppenot =

French footballer (born 1990)

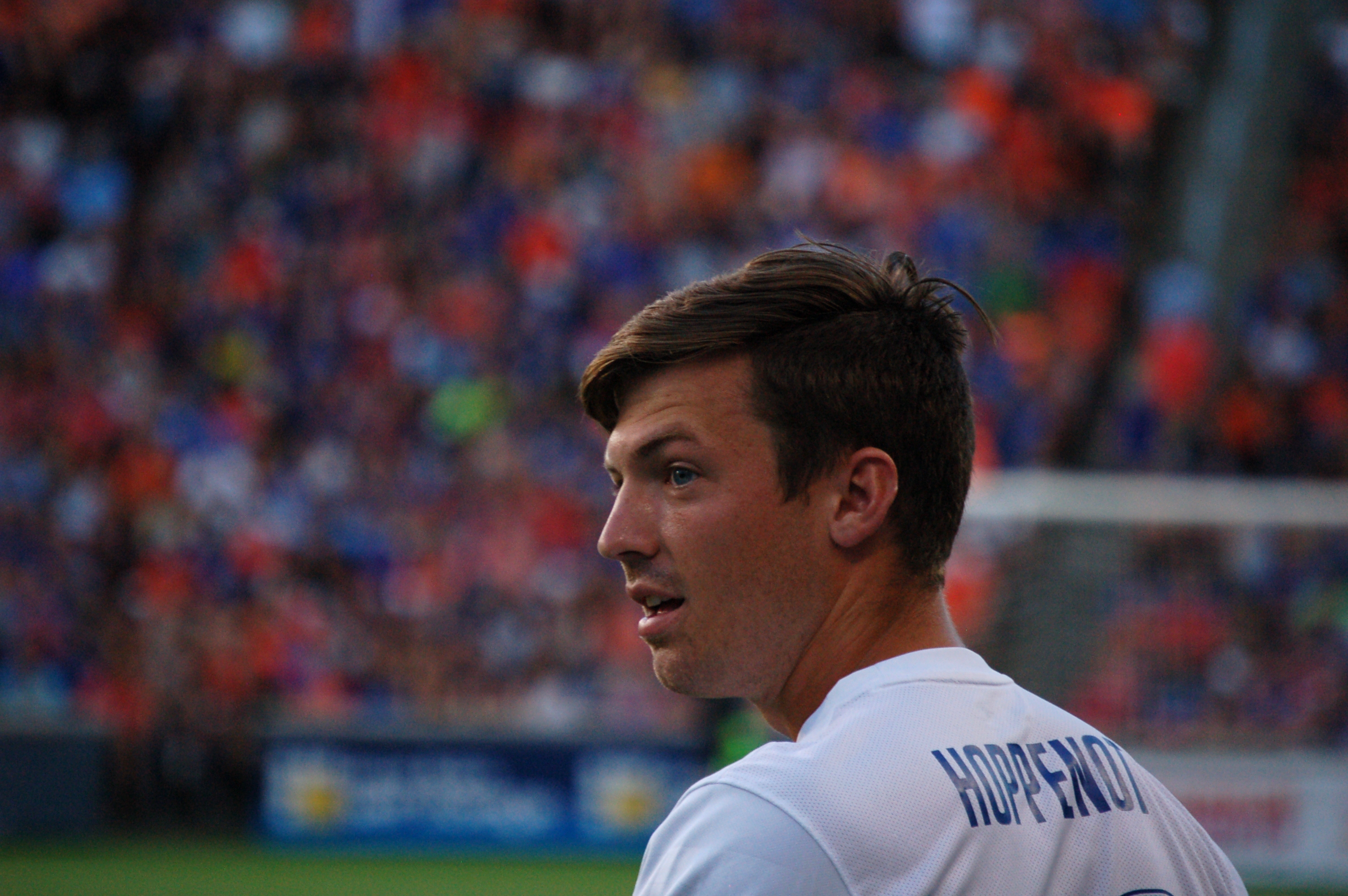
- Hoppenot with FC Cincinnati in 2016

Personal information
- Full name: Antoine Laurent Hoppenot
- Date of birth: 23 November 1990 (age 35)
- Place of birth: Paris, France
- Height: 5 ft 8 in (1.73 m)
- Positions: Forward; midfielder

Youth career
- Princeton Union
- 2004–2007: Princeton Panthers

College career
Years	Team	Apps	(Gls)
2008–2011	Princeton Tigers	69	(26)

Senior career*
Years	Team	Apps	(Gls)
2010–2011	Central Jersey Spartans	26	(7)
2012–2015	Philadelphia Union	69	(7)
2012	→ Harrisburg City Islanders (loan)	3	(1)
2014	→ Harrisburg City Islanders (loan)	13	(2)
2015	→ Harrisburg City Islanders (loan)	9	(3)
2016	FC Cincinnati	12	(0)
2017–2018	Reno 1868	64	(17)
2019	Tampa Bay Rowdies	9	(0)
2019–2021	Louisville City	71	(9)
2022	Detroit City	32	(7)
2023	Hartford Athletic	30	(3)
Total		338	(56)
- * Club domestic league appearances and goals as of October 18, 2023

Antoine Laurent Hoppenot (born 23 November 1990) is a French former professional footballer.

== Career ==
=== College and amateur ===
Hoppenot played college soccer at Princeton University between 2008 and 2011. During his time at Princeton, Hoppenot was named First-Team All-Ivy in 2011, Ivy League Player of the Year, semi-finalist for the Hermann Trophy, second-team NSCAA All-America, third-team College Soccer News All-America, first-team All-Ivy and first-team All-Region in 2010, first-team All-Ivy League and third-team All-Region by the NSCAA in 2009, and second-team All-Ivy in 2008.

During his time at college, Hoppenot also played for USL Premier Development League club Central Jersey Spartans between 2010 and 2011.

=== Professional ===
==== Philadelphia Union ====
Philadelphia Union selected Hoppenot in the third round (No. 51 overall) of the 2012 MLS Supplemental Draft.

Hoppenot made his debut as a substitute during a 1–0 win against Columbus Crew on 14 April 2012.

Hoppenot was sent on loan to USL Pro club Harrisburg City Islanders on 20 April. He remained a Union player through 2015 with frequent loans to Harrisburg City.

==== FC Cincinnati ====
On 21 January 2016, Hoppenot signed with expansion side FC Cincinnati of the United Soccer League.

==== Reno 1868 FC ====
On 2 February 2017, Hoppenot signed with expansion side Reno 1868 FC of the United Soccer League. Hoppenot was released by Reno on December 3, 2018.

==== Tampa Bay Rowdies ====
On 6 December 2018, Hoppenot joined USL Championship side Tampa Bay Rowdies ahead of their 2019 season.

==== Louisville City FC ====
On 27 June 2019, Hoppenot joined Louisville City FC from the Rowdies, as part of a trade that sent Lucky Mkosana to Tampa Bay. Following the 2021 season, Louisville opted to decline their contract option on Hoppenot.

==== Detroit City FC ====
Hoppenot joined Detroit City FC in February 2022, ahead of their inaugural season in the USL Championship. Hoppenot scored Detroit City's first goal in USL Championship history, during a 1–0 victory over the Charleston Battery.

==== Hartford Athletic ====
Hoppenot signed with Hartford Athletic on December 1, 2022.

== Personal ==
He is the son of Hervé and Anne Hoppenot. He has a younger brother Maxime, who was captain of the Tufts soccer team. He also has an older brother Pierre, who played soccer at Washington University in St. Louis and a sister Claire.

In addition to playing professionally, Hoppenot also coached soccer to players in Pennsylvania.

Hoppenot also holds United States citizenship.

== Career statistics ==
=== Club ===
Club performance			League		Cup		League Cup		Continental		Total	
Season	Club	League	Apps	Goals	Apps	Goals	Apps	Goals	Apps	Goals	Apps	Goals
USA			League		Open Cup		League Cup		North America		Total	
2012	Philadelphia Union	Major League Soccer	25	4	3	1	0	0	0	0	28	5
2012	Harrisburg City Islanders (loan)	USL Pro	3	1	0	0	0	0	0	0	3	1
2013	Philadelphia Union	Major League Soccer	21	3	1	0	0	0	0	0	21	3
2014	Philadelphia Union	Major League Soccer	13	0	2	0	0	0	0	0	15	0
2014	Harrisburg City Islanders (loan)	USL Pro	10	2	0	0	0	0	0	0	10	2
2015	Philadelphia Union	Major League Soccer	1	0	0	0	0	0	0	0	1	0
2015	Harrisburg City Islanders (loan)	USL	9	3	0	0	0	0	0	0	9	3
2016	FC Cincinnati	USL	12	0	1	0	0	0	0	0	13	0
2017	Reno 1868 FC	USL	0	0	0	0	0	0	0	0	0	0
Total	USA		94	13	7	1	0	0	0	0	100	14
Career total			94	13	7	1	0	0	0	0	100	14

== Honours ==
=== Individual ===
- USL Championship Assists Champion: 2022
