= Thomas Luke =

British flying ace (1891–1935)

Thomas Carlyon Luke
- Born: 21 June 1891; Plymouth, England
- Died: 1 July 1935 (aged 44); RAF Halton, Buckinghamshire, England.
- Military career
- Allegiance: United Kingdom
- Branch: British Army; Royal Air Force
- Service years: 1914–1935
- Rank: Squadron Leader
- Nickname: Sammy
- Units: Royal Engineers; No. 66 Squadron RFC; No. 209 Squadron RAF; No. 56 Squadron RAF; No. 45 Squadron RAF; No. 7 Squadron RAF; Station Flight, RAF Andover; No. 18 Squadron RAF
- Commands: No. 18 Squadron RAF
- Conflicts: World War I • Western Front
- Awards: Military Cross; Air Force Cross

Squadron Leader Thomas Carlyon Luke MC, AFC (21 July 1891 – 1 July 1935) was a British World War I flying ace credited with six aerial victories.

== Biography ==
=== World War I ===
Luke was born in Plymouth, Devon, the son of Epænetus Ernest Luke and Ida Mary (née Mabley). On the outbreak of war he enlisted into the Royal Engineers, rising to the rank of corporal, eventually being commissioned as a second lieutenant on 1 April 1916. He soon transferred to the Royal Flying Corps, and was granted Royal Aero Club Aviators' Certificate No. 7740, and appointed a flying officer on 4 January 1917. After completing his training, he was assigned to No. 66 Squadron RFC, flying a Sopwith Pup. He gained his first victory on 23 May 1917 by driving down out of control a Type C reconnaissance aircraft, repeating the feat on 28 May. On 15 June he destroyed an Albatros D.III west of Houthem, and sent down another in flames on 28 July, east of Roeselare, but was then himself also shot down and wounded.

Luke was awarded the Military Cross, which was gazetted on 24 August 1917. His citation read:

Temporary Second Lieutenant Thomas Carlyon Luke, RE and RFC.

"For conspicuous gallantry and devotion to duty in aerial combats. On several occasions he attacked hostile formations and dispersed them, although they were in superior numbers, showing great dash and fearlessness in engaging them at close range. He has taken part in thirty-five offensive patrols, at all times setting a fine example of courage and devotion to duty."

He was promoted to lieutenant on 1 October 1917. Luke returned to active duty, being posted to No. 209 Squadron RAF, flying a Sopwith Camel, in mid-1918. On 8 August he shared in the shooting down in flames of a Halberstadt C reconnaissance aircraft over Harbonnières with Captain Robert Foster, and Lieutenants Cedric Edwards, Kenneth M. Walker and M. A. Harker. He was appointed a flight commander with the rank of temporary captain on 13 August. His sixth and last aerial victory came on 25 August, when he destroyed a Fokker D.VII over Baissy. His final tally was two enemy aircraft burnt, two destroyed and two driven down out of control.

=== Post-war career ===
Luke remained in the Royal Air Force postwar, being granted a permanent commission as a lieutenant on 1 August 1919, and was promoted to flight lieutenant on 1 January 1921. On 1 November 1922 Luke was transferred from the RAF Depot (Inland Area) to No. 56 Squadron (Inland Area) to serve as adjutant. In July 1923 he took part in the fourth RAF Aerial Pageant at Hendon Aerodrome, competing in the "low bombing" event in which five Sopwith Snipes took turns to attack a target representing a "temporarily disabled tank" with dummy bombs. Luke won the event, with Flying Officer Alan Jerrard coming second.

On 18 September 1924 Luke was posted to the headquarters of the Basrah Group, in RAF Iraq Command, then served at the headquarters of Iraq Command from 1 November 1925. On 23 November 1927 he was posted to No. 45 Squadron RAF, serving in the Middle East. He eventually returned to the UK, and was posted to the headquarters of No. 21 Group, based at RAF West Drayton, on 1 November 1929.

On 5 November 1930 Luke was promoted to Squadron Leader, and was posted to No. 7 Squadron RAF, based at RAF Worthy Down two weeks later. He moved to the Station Flight at RAF Andover on 23 January 1931, then to No. 18 Squadron RAF, based at RAF Upper Heyford on 20 October 1931, assuming command of the squadron on 19 November 1932. In the annual Air Exercises of July 1933 Luke commanded No. 18 Squadron's Hawker Harts from RAF Martlesham Heath as part of the forces of "Southland", commanded by Air Vice-Marshal Sir Tom Webb-Bowen, attacking the territory of "Northland", commanded by Air Vice-Marshal Frederick Bowhill. Luke relinquished command of No. 18 Squadron on 21 January 1935, and was posted to the Air Armament School at RAF Eastchurch, for the Specialist Armament Course, on 4 March 1935. He was awarded the Air Force Cross on 3 June 1935.

Squadron Leader Luke died on 1 July 1935 in Princess Mary's RAF Hospital at RAF Halton, Buckinghamshire, England.

== Bibliography ==
- Shores, Christopher F.; Franks, Norman & Guest, Russell F. (1990). Above the Trenches: a Complete Record of the Fighter Aces and Units of the British Empire Air Forces 1915–1920. London, UK: Grub Street. ISBN 978-0-948817-19-9.
