= Luke, Vareš =

Village in Vareš, Bosnia and Herzegovina

Luke
- Village
- Location within Bosnia and Herzegovina
- Coordinates: 44.0575575°N 18.3042606°E
- Country: Bosnia and Herzegovina
- Entity: Federation of Bosnia and Herzegovina
- Canton: Zenica-Doboj
- Municipality: Vareš

Area
  - Total: 0.35 sq mi (0.90 km^{2})

Population (2013)
  - Total: 108
  - Density: 310/sq mi (120/km^{2})
- Time zone: UTC+1 (CET)
  - Summer (DST): UTC+2 (CEST)

Luke is a village in the municipality of Vareš, Bosnia and Herzegovina.

== Demographics ==
According to the 2013 census, its population was 108, all Bosniaks.
