= Paul Nicholson (footballer) =

English footballer

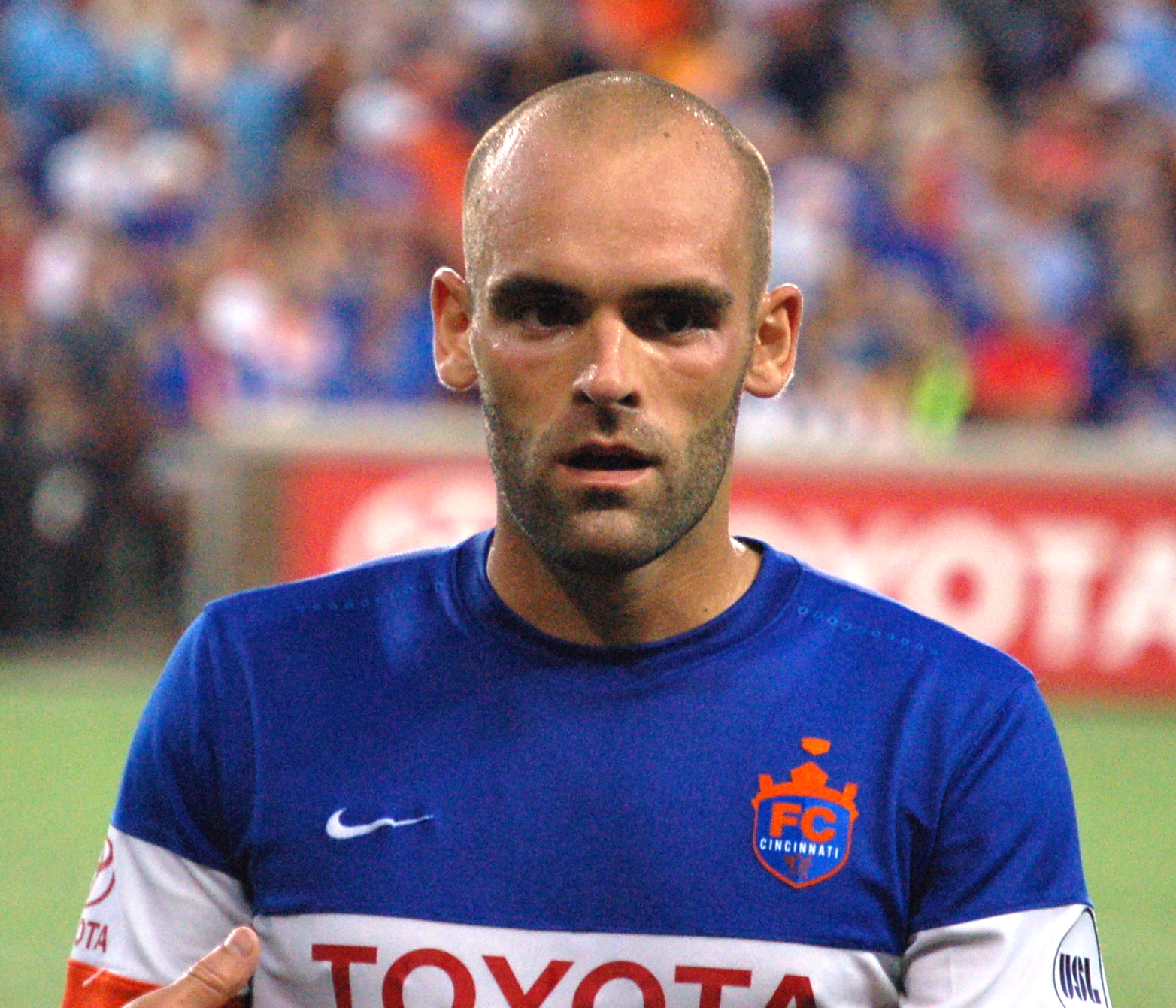
- Nicholson with FC Cincinnati in 2016

Personal information
- Full name: Paul Nicholson
- Date of birth: 10 August 1986 (age 40)
- Place of birth: Whitehaven, England
- Position: Midfielder

Youth career
- 2003–2005: Morecambe

College career
Years	Team	Apps	(Gls)
2005–2008	Rio Grande Red Storm		

Senior career*
Years	Team	Apps	(Gls)
2009	West Virginia Chaos	14	(1)
2010	GPS Portland Phoenix	16	(1)
2011–2015	Wilmington Hammerheads	119	(6)
2016–2017	FC Cincinnati	33	(1)

Managerial career
- 2018–2020: Cincinnati Dutch Lions
- 2021–: Kings Hammer SC
- * Club domestic league appearances and goals

Paul Nicholson (born 10 August 1986 in Whitehaven) is an English retired footballer who played in the United Soccer League from 2011 to 2017.

== Career ==
=== College and amateur ===
Nicholson started his career playing for Morecambe under 17 and under 18 team. After being unsuccessful in obtaining a professional contract with the club, Nicholson moved to the United States in 2005 after accepting a scholarship to play college soccer at the University of Rio Grande. He was selected a first team All-American in 2008 and first team All-AMC. Nicholson was named in the All Tournament team for the 2008 NAIA Tournament and was tabbed the tournament's Most Valuable Defensive Player. He was honorable mention All-AMC in 2007 and was on the second team in 2006.

During his college career, Nicholson also played with USL Premier Development League club West Virginia Chaos during their 2009 season. He also appeared for USL PDL club GPS Portland Phoenix during their 2010 season.

=== Professional ===
Nicholson signed his first professional contract in February 2011, joining USL Pro club Wilmington Hammerheads. He made his professional debut on 17 April 2011 in Wilmington's first game of the 2011 season, a 1–0 win over the Rochester Rhinos, and scored his first professional goal on 29 April, in a 3–2 win over the Pittsburgh Riverhounds.

Wilmington re-signed Nicholson for the 2012 season on 13 February 2012.

After five years with Wilmington, Nicholson signed with FC Cincinnati ahead of their inaugural 2016 season. Following the conclusion of the 2017 season, Nicholson announced his retirement from professional football.

=== Coaching ===
Nicholson was the head coach at Cincinnati Dutch Lions FC in the USL League 2. In his first season as head coach the Lions had a 6-4-4 record and finished 3rd in the Great Lakes Division. In his second season has the head coach, in 2019, the Lions finished slightly better with a 6-3-5 record but fell just short of the USL League 2 playoffs. In 2019, Nicholson and the Dutch Lions won the Subway Cup, winning the season series against their rival Dayton Dutch Lions FC. In 2020, he left the club.

In 2021, he became the head coach of USL League Two club Kings Hammer SC.
