= Billy Luke =

English footballer

Personal information
- Full name: William Luke
- Date of birth: 17 December 1890
- Place of birth: Acklington, England
- Date of death: January 1992 (aged 101)
- Position: Outside right

Senior career*
Years	Team	Apps	(Gls)
- Trimdon Grange
1911–1912	Bedlington United		
1912–1914	Preston North End	8	(2)
1914–1915	Hartlepools United	30	(9)
- * Club domestic league appearances and goals

William Luke MM (17 December 1890 – January 1992) was an English professional footballer who played in the Football League for Preston North End as an outside right.

== Personal life ==
On 28 October 1915, over a year after the outbreak of the First World War, Luke enlisted in the Royal Field Artillery and qualified as a class 2 signaller. He was deployed to the Western Front during the Battle of the Somme and participated in the battle's closing action on the Ancre in November 1916. Luke's unit moved to trench lines east of Arras in April 1917 and he was seriously wounded in the leg on 9 April, which led to his discharge from the army in August 1918. In the aftermath of his wounding, Luke was recommended for the Military Medal and the award was gazetted on 18 July 1917. At the time of his death in January 1992, Luke was the oldest-living former professional footballer in Britain.

== Career statistics ==
Appearances and goals by club, season and competition
Club	Season	League			FA Cup		Total	
Club	Season	Division	Apps	Goals	Apps	Goals	Apps	Goals
Preston North End	1912–13	Second Division	8	2	1	0	9	2
Hartlepools United	1914–15	North Eastern League	30	9	2	1	32	10
Career total			38	11	3	1	41	12

== Honours ==
Preston North End

- Football League Second Division: 1911–12
