= Charles A. Luke =

Charles A. Luke (born 1961) is an American educator, author, nonprofit leader and consultant. He made an unsuccessful run for the Texas House of Representatives in 2002. He has also occasionally published writings on political analysis and educational funding.

== Background ==
Luke was born on August 17, 1961, in Tulsa, Oklahoma. He attended school in the Tulsa Public School system and in 1979 graduated from Booker T. Washington High School, a magnet school with a specialized curriculum. After high school Luke served as a pastor of two Southern Baptist churches from 1981 to 1994. Luke attended Texas Tech University, graduating magna cum laude with a BS in education in 1990. In 1995 he received a master's degree in education administration from that same institution. In 2007 Luke received his doctorate in education administration from the University of North Texas in Denton, Texas.

In 2001, Luke was a candidate for the governor's appointment to the state's Teacher Retirement System in 2001. In 2002, while serving as a Texas public school superintendent, Luke launched a primary campaign against incumbent Jim Keffer in a bid for the Texas House of Representatives in District 60, representing Hood, Eastland, Brown, Stephens, Shackleford, and Palo Pinto counties. He lost the election with just over 26% of the vote in a three-person race.

In 2007 Luke published his dissertation entitled "Equity in Texas Public Education Facilities Funding," which explored levels of equity in Texas state funding for public school facilities by analyzing capital expenditure outlays among the state's 1,039 school districts.
