= Ross Tomaselli =

American soccer player

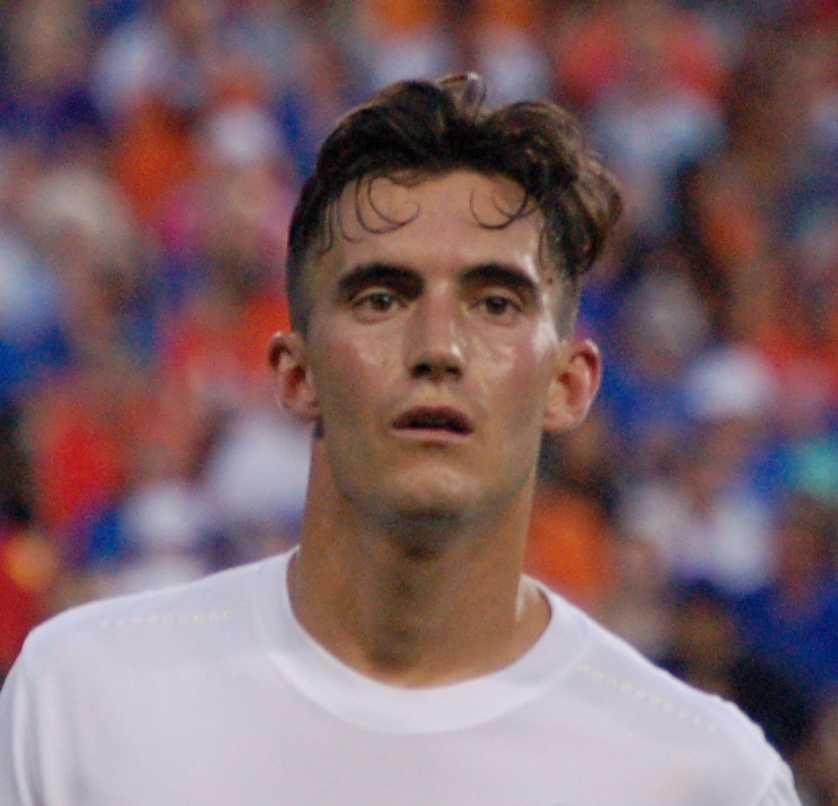
- Tomaselli playing for FC Cincinnati in 2016

Personal information
- Date of birth: January 9, 1992 (age 34)
- Place of birth: Wilmington, North Carolina, United States
- Height: 5 ft 9 in (1.75 m)
- Position: Midfielder

Youth career
- 2010–2013: Wake Forest Demon Deacons

Senior career*
Years	Team	Apps	(Gls)
2014–2015	Wilmington Hammerheads	32	(0)
2016	FC Cincinnati	18	(0)
- * Club domestic league appearances and goals

Ross Tomaselli (born January 9, 1992, in Wilmington, North Carolina) is a former American soccer player.

== Career ==
Tomaselli played four years of college soccer at Wake Forest University between 2010 and 2013.

Tomaselli went undrafted in the 2014 MLS SuperDraft and later signed with his hometown club Wilmington Hammerheads of the USL Pro. After two seasons with Wilmington, Tomaselli signed with new United Soccer League side FC Cincinnati ahead of their inaugural 2016 season.
