= Pat McMahon (soccer, born 1986) =

American soccer player

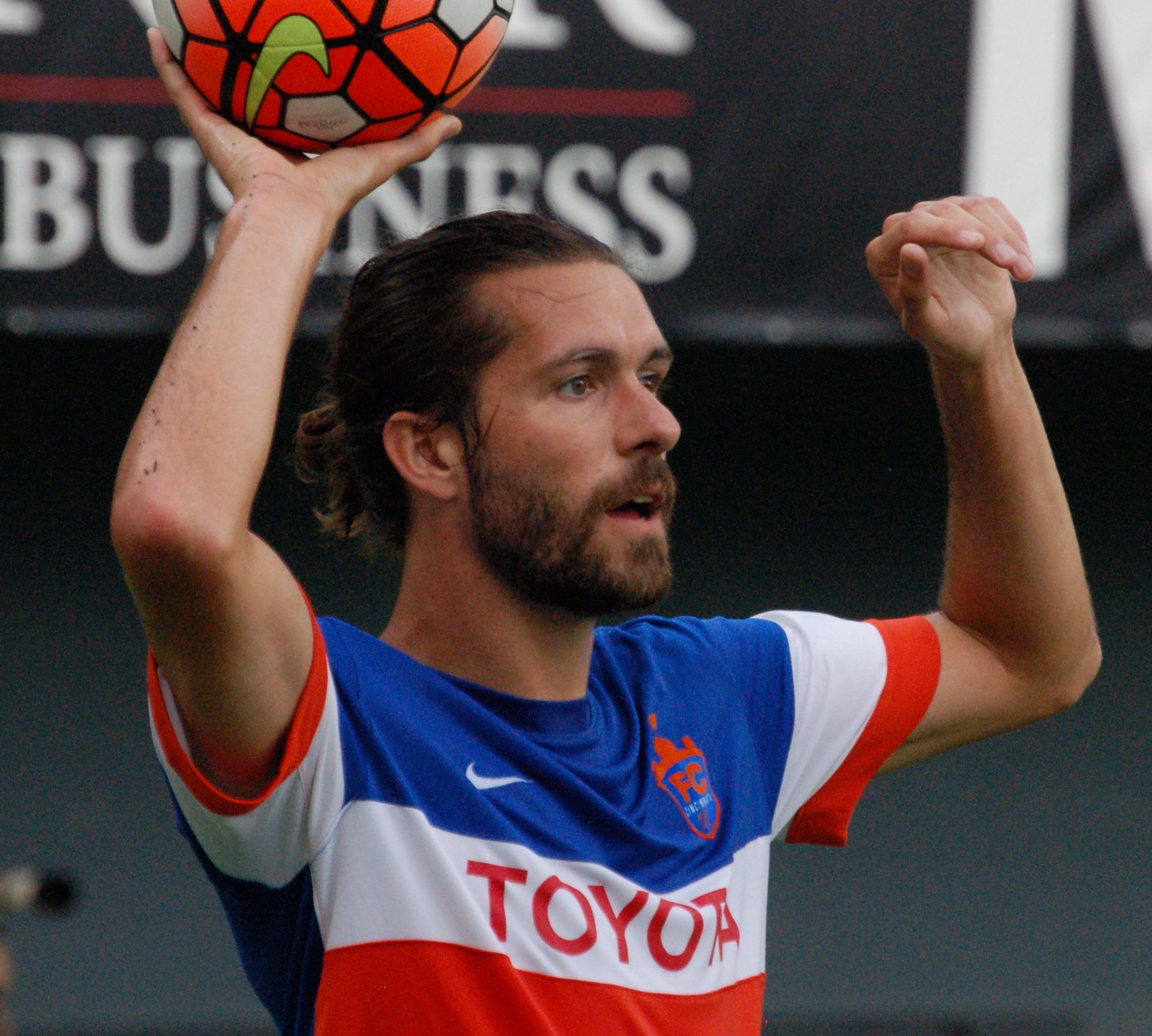
- McMahon making a throw-in while playing for FC Cincinnati in 2016

Personal information
- Full name: Patrick McMahon
- Date of birth: November 5, 1986 (age 39)
- Place of birth: Bolingbrook, Illinois, United States
- Height: 1.80 m (5 ft 11 in)
- Position: Defender

College career
Years	Team	Apps	(Gls)
2005–2008	UIC Flames		

Senior career*
Years	Team	Apps	(Gls)
2005	West Michigan Edge	9	(0)
2006	Kalamazoo Kingdom	14	(0)
2008	Chicago Fire Premier	16	(0)
2011–2012	Wynnum District	55	(5)
2013	Ljungskile SK	6	(0)
2014–2015	Rochester Rhinos	50	(0)
2016–2017	FC Cincinnati	28	(1)
2018–2021	Louisville City	60	(2)
- * Club domestic league appearances and goals as of November 5, 2021

Pat McMahon (born November 5, 1986) is an American soccer player.

== Early life ==
=== Personal ===
McMahon was born in Bolingbrook, a suburb of Chicago, Illinois, to John and Elizabeth McMahon. He first played competitive soccer with the Ajax FC Chicago youth team and attended high school at Benet Academy. While at Benet, he played soccer as well as track and field. During his three years playing soccer Benet twice won the East Suburban Catholic Conference and McMahon was thrice named an All-East Suburban Catholic Conference honoree. He was also a two-time All-Section selection and was an All-Area honorable mention as a senior.

=== College and youth ===
McMahon played four years of college soccer for the UIC Flames at the University of Illinois at Chicago between 2005 and 2008 where he started every match. As a sophomore he was a part of the nation's top-rated defense that allowed only eight goals in all competitions with 13 clean sheets as UIC won the Horizon League Regular Season Championship and qualified for NCAA tournament. As a junior he scored his first collegiate goal on September 2, 2006, against Marquette and was part of a defense that earned 14 clean sheets; a UIC record. He scored his second goal of the year in the Horizon League Tournament Championship game against Green Bay as UIC won the Horizon League Tournament and qualified for the NCAA tournament for the second consecutive season. In the NCAA tournament UIC reached the quarterfinals for first time in its history. As a senior he again scored two goals as UIC won the Horizon League Regular Season Championship. Following the regular season McMahon was named to the Horizon League Championship All-Tournament Team and UIC qualified for the NCAA tournament for the third consecutive season for the first time in its history. McMahon finished his career at UIC by starting a school record 85 consecutive matches.

While at college, McMahon also appeared for USL PDL clubs West Michigan Edge in 2005, Kalamazoo Kingdom in 2006 and Chicago Fire Premier in 2008 making a total of 39 appearances and going goalless across all three clubs. During his season there, the Chicago Fire Premier won the Great Lakes Division of the Central Conference to qualify for the PDL playoffs where they would lose in the Divisional Round.

Following graduation, McMahon went on trial with an expansion USL team in Puerto Rico before returning to Chicago to train with Bridges FC. After a year with Bridges FC he went on trial with Danish football club HB Køge but fractured his ankle before earning a contract. He then immigrated to Australia and signed with semi-professional Wynnum District SC of the Australian Brisbane Premier League. He played two seasons for Wynnum beginning in 2011 where Wynnum was named BPL Premiers for winning the regular season title to qualify for the finals series. During the 2012 season, Wynnum again qualified the finals series which they went on to win to be named BPL Grand Final Champions. Following the 2012 season McMahon was named to the Brisbane Premier League All-league teams as well as being named the Wayne Gracey Player of the Year. During his two years with Wynnum he appeared in 55 matches and scored 5 goals.

== Club career ==
=== Ljungskile SK ===
Not believing he could obtain the visa required to qualify for the A-League, McMahon returned to the United States and went on tour with Bridges FC. He went on trial with Swedish Superettan side Ljungskile SK and signed his first fully professional contract with them on July 24 for the 2013 season as a defensive midfielder. He made his professional debut on August 4 against Hammarby IF and went on to appear in six league matches. He also appeared in one of Ljungskile's matches in the Svenska Cupen against Ullareds IK and went goalless across all competitions as Ljungskile avoided relegation.

=== Rochester Rhinos ===
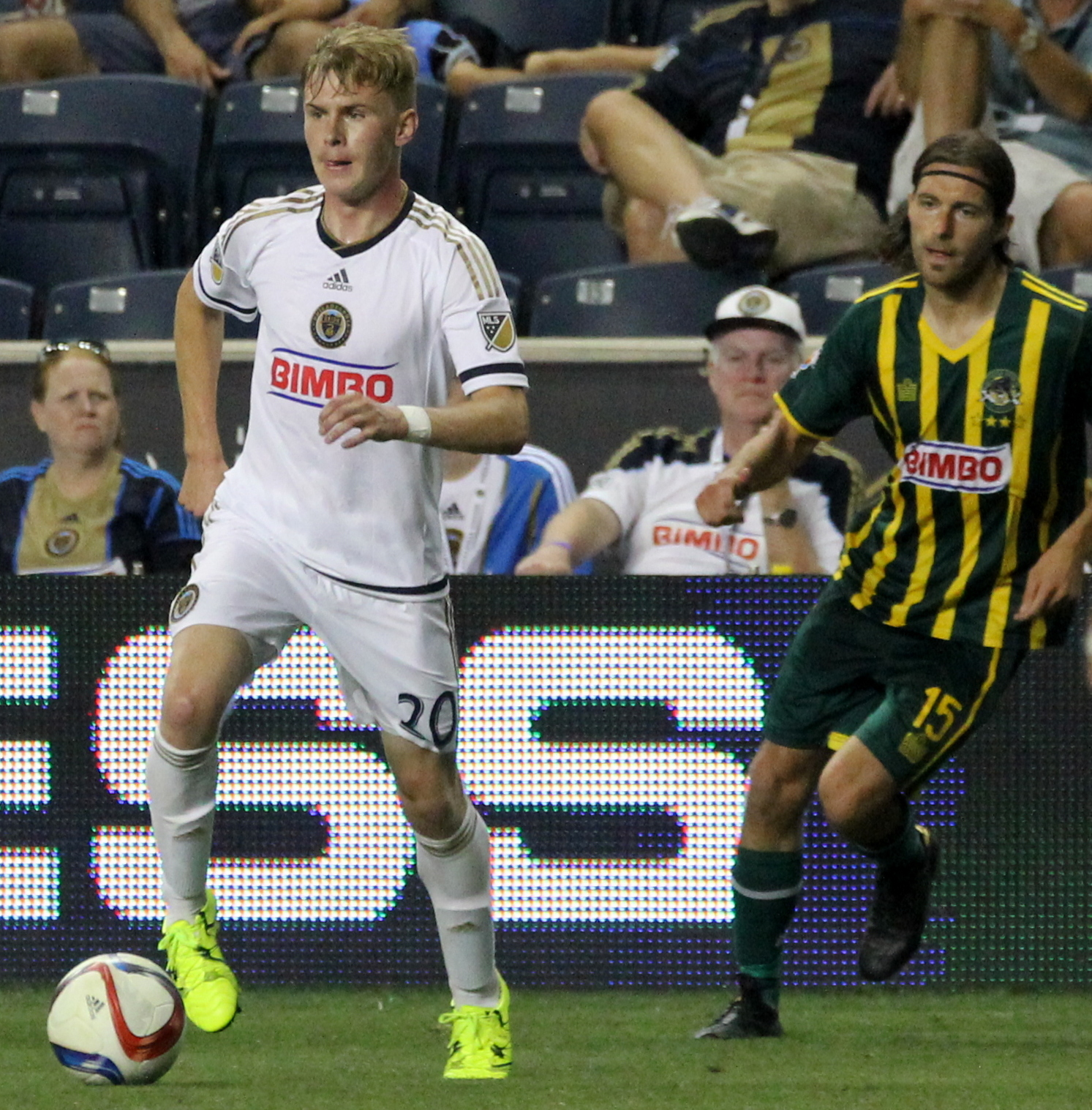
McMahon with Rochester in 2015, pursuing Jimmy McLaughlin of Philadelphia Union. The two would later be teammates on FC Cincinnati.

After his contract wasn't renewed, McMahon returned to the United States and went on trial with the Rochester Rhinos of USL Pro. He signed with Rochester on March 21 for the 2014 season, and made his USL Pro debut on April 5 in their season opener against Orlando City SC. He went on to appear in 25 of Rochester's 28 league matches as Rochester finished sixth in the league to qualify for the USL Cup Playoffs. In the USL Cup Playoffs, McMahon appeared in Rochester's lone match: a 2–1 defeat against LA Galaxy II. He also appeared in two of Rochester's three U.S. Open Cup matches making his debut in the competition on June 17 against MLS side D.C. United; a match Rochester won 1–0.

McMahon remained with Rochester for the 2015 season and made his season debut on March 28 against New York Red Bulls II. He went on to appear in 27 of Rochester's 28 league matches as part of a defense that only allowed 15 goals; a USL Pro record. Rochester only lost one league match en route to winning the inaugural season of the USL Eastern Conference as well the league's regular season title. McMahon also appeared in all three of Rochester's USL Cup Playoff matches as Rochester won the Cup, becoming only the second team to win both the regular season and league title in the same year. McMahon also appear in two of Rochester's three U.S. Open Cup matches and went goalless across all competitions.

=== FC Cincinnati ===
After two years with Rochester, McMahon signed with USL expansion side FC Cincinnati on December 7, 2015 and made his Cincinnati debut on March 26 against Charleston Battery. He went on to appear in 26 of Cincinnati's 30 league matches and scored his first goal as professional on April 4 against rival Louisville City FC; his only goal of the season. Finishing third in the Eastern Conference Cincinnati qualified for the USL Cup playoffs where McMahon would appear in Cincinnati's only playoff match. He also appeared in one of Cincinnati's two U.S. Open Cup matches going goalless in both cup competitions.

McMahon remained with FC Cincinnati for the 2017 season and made his season debut on April 15 against Saint Louis FC. He only appeared in two of Cincinnati's 32 league matches as he lost playing time to Justin Hoyte and Matt Bahner as well due to a late season injury which also prevented him from being selected in Cincinnati's only USL Cup playoff match. He also appeared in one of Cincinnati's six U.S. Open Cup matches as Cincinnati reached the semifinals of the competition for the first time in their history and would go goalless across all competitions.

=== Louisville City FC ===
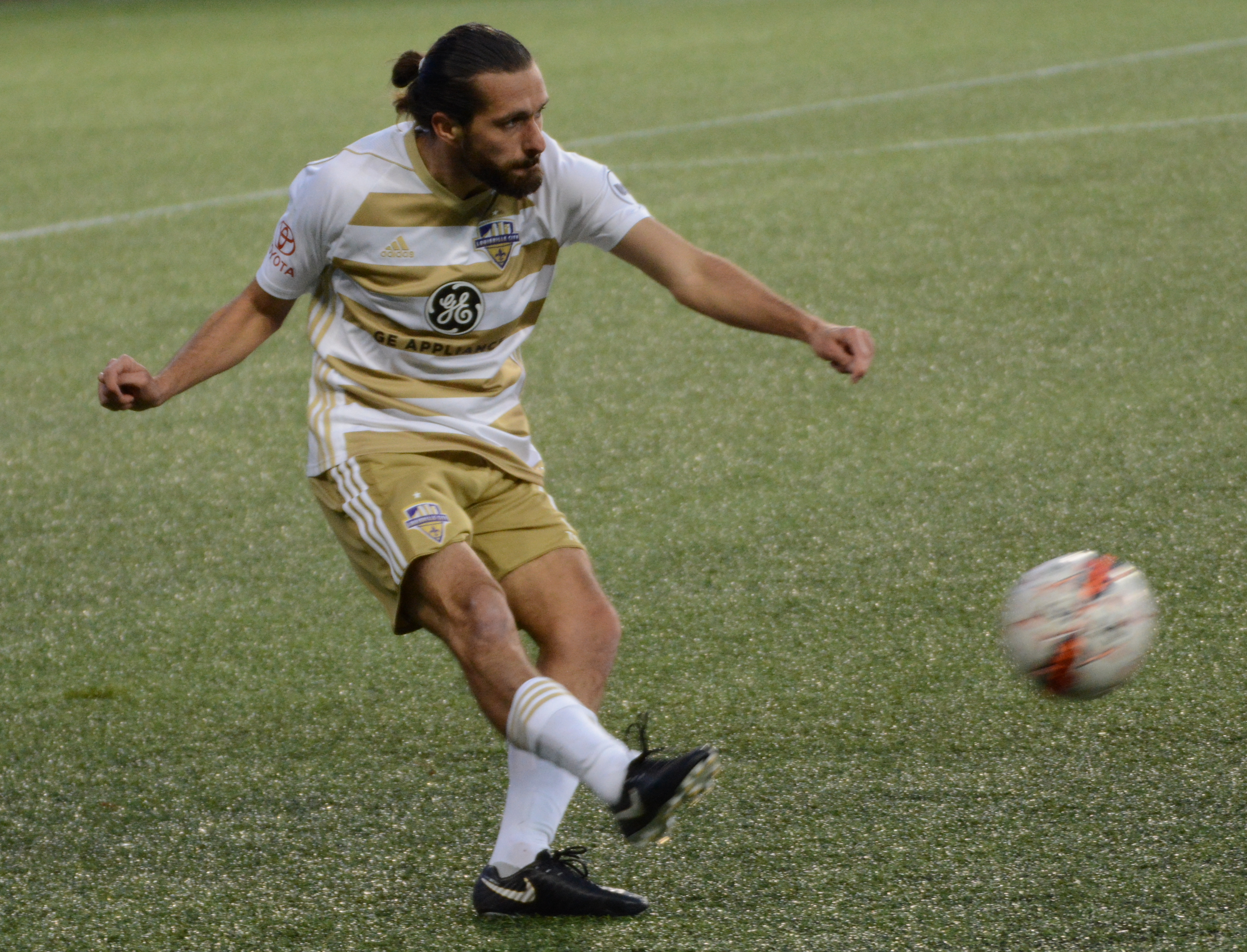
McMahon playing for Louisville City in 2018

On December 5, 2017, McMahon signed with Louisville City FC, his previous club's main rival, for the 2018 season joining former teammates Luke Spencer and Sean Totsch. He made his season debut on March 17 against USL expansion side Nashville SC and went on to appear in 14 of Louisville's 34 league matches without scoring a goal. He also appeared in four of Louisville's five U.S. Open Cup matches as Louisville reached the quarter-finals of the competition for the first time in its history. This included a 3–2 victory over the New England Revolution of MLS; Louisville's first victory over an MLS side. A game where McMahon scored an Own goal Although he didn't make an appearance in any of Louisville's four USL Cup playoff matches McMahon and Louisville went on to win the USL Cup Final against Phoenix. Following the 2021 season, Louisville opted to decline their contract option on McMahon.

== Honors ==
=== Club ===
Rochester Rhinos

- USL (Regular Season) (1): 2015
- USL Cup (1): 2015

Louisville City FC

- USL Cup (1): 2018
