= Tyler Polak =

American soccer player (born 1992)

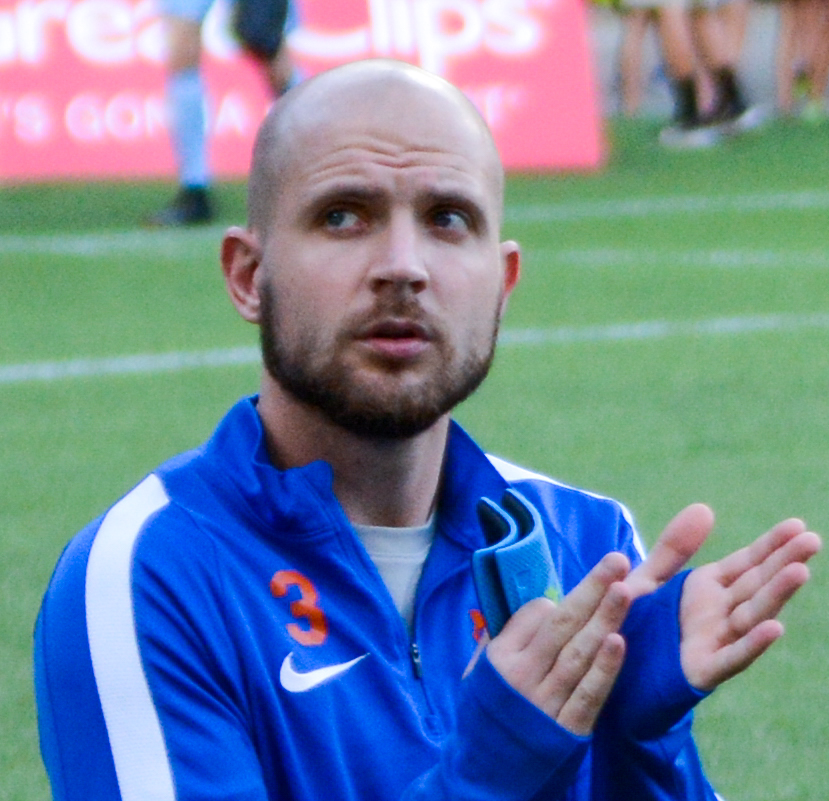
- Polak with FC Cincinnati in 2017

Personal information
- Full name: Tyler John Polak
- Date of birth: May 13, 1992 (age 34)
- Place of birth: Lincoln, Nebraska, United States
- Height: 5 ft 8 in (1.73 m)
- Position: Defender

Team information
- Current team: Greenville Triumph
- Number: 3

Youth career
- 2007–2009: IMG Soccer Academy
- 2010–2011: Creighton Bluejays

Senior career*
Years	Team	Apps	(Gls)
2011	Chicago Fire Premier	8	(0)
2012–2013	New England Revolution	1	(0)
2013	→ Rochester Rhinos (loan)	18	(0)
2014–2015	Minnesota United	3	(0)
2016–2017	FC Cincinnati	49	(0)
2018	Miami FC 2	16	(0)
2018	Saint Louis FC	6	(0)
2019–	Greenville Triumph	168	(0)

International career^{‡}
2007–2009	United States U17	35	(0)
2010	United States U20	1	(0)
- * Club domestic league appearances and goals as of October 31, 2026 ‡ National team caps and goals as of January 13, 2012

Tyler John Polak (born May 13, 1992) is an American soccer player who currently plays for Greenville Triumph in USL League One.

== Career ==
=== Club ===
Polak was born in Lincoln, Nebraska and attended Creighton University for three semesters before being drafted 22nd overall in the 2012 MLS SuperDraft by New England. He was a member of the 2012 Generation adidas program. While at Creighton he also played for Chicago Fire Premier in the USL Premier Development League.

Polak made his debut with New England on March 10, 2012, appearing in the season opening match against San Jose Earthquakes.

On March 27, 2013, Polak was loaned to New England's USL Pro affiliate club Rochester Rhinos. He was released following the 2013 season.

Polak joined Minnesota United FC of the North American Soccer League ahead of the 2014 season.

After two years with Minnesota, Polak signed with FC Cincinnati in the United Soccer League ahead of their inaugural 2016 season. At the end of the 2017 season, FC Cincinnati announced that Polak's contract had expired and would not be renewed for 2018.

After spending time with National Premier Soccer League side Miami FC 2, Polak joined USL club Saint Louis FC on August 15, 2018.

Polak was announced as the first signing for Greenville Triumph SC in USL League One on January 4, 2019.

=== International ===
Polak has represented the United States at the under-17 and under-20 levels. He played for the United States at the 2009 FIFA U-17 World Cup in Nigeria.
