= Eric Stevenson (soccer) =

American soccer player

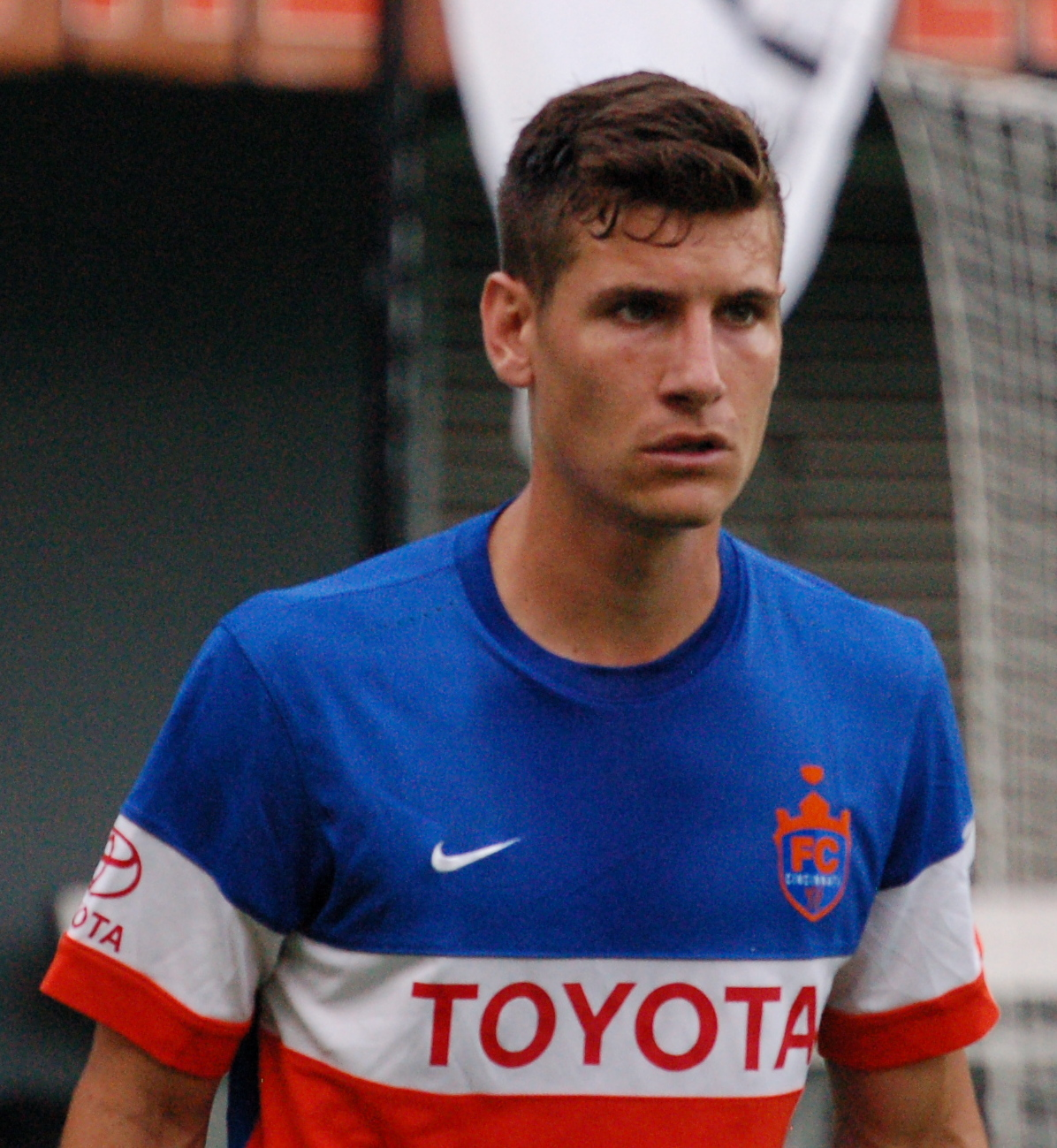
- Stevenson playing for FC Cincinnati in 2016

Personal information
- Full name: Eric Stevenson
- Date of birth: August 30, 1990 (age 36)
- Place of birth: Columbus, Ohio, United States
- Height: 1.72 m (5 ft 8 in)
- Position: Midfielder

Youth career
- 2008–2009: Columbus Crew

College career
Years	Team	Apps	(Gls)
2009–2013	Akron Zips	77	(13)

Senior career*
Years	Team	Apps	(Gls)
2013	Seattle Sounders FC U-23	6	(1)
2014	New York Red Bulls	1	(0)
2016	FC Cincinnati	26	(3)
- * Club domestic league appearances and goals

Eric Stevenson (born August 30, 1990) is a retired American soccer player. He played professionally as a midfielder for New York Red Bulls in Major League Soccer and for FC Cincinnati in the United Soccer League.

== Career ==
=== Youth, college, and amateur ===
After spending time with the Columbus Crew U-18 academy team, Stevenson committed to the University of Akron where he redshirted his freshman season. In 2010, he made 13 appearances and finished the year with one goal and two assists and helped Akron win their first College Cup title in school history. In 2011, he started in 14 of the 20 games he played including 12 starts at left back and finished the year with one assist. His breakout year came in 2012 when he started all 22 games he played and tallied seven goals and five assists on his way to being named to the All-MAC Second team. In his final season with the Zips, Stevenson made 23 appearances and finished the year with five goals and five assists. He went on to be named First team All-MAC and First team All-Great Lakes Region in 2013.

During his time in college, Stevenson also played in the USL Premier Development League for Seattle Sounders FC U-23.

=== Professional ===
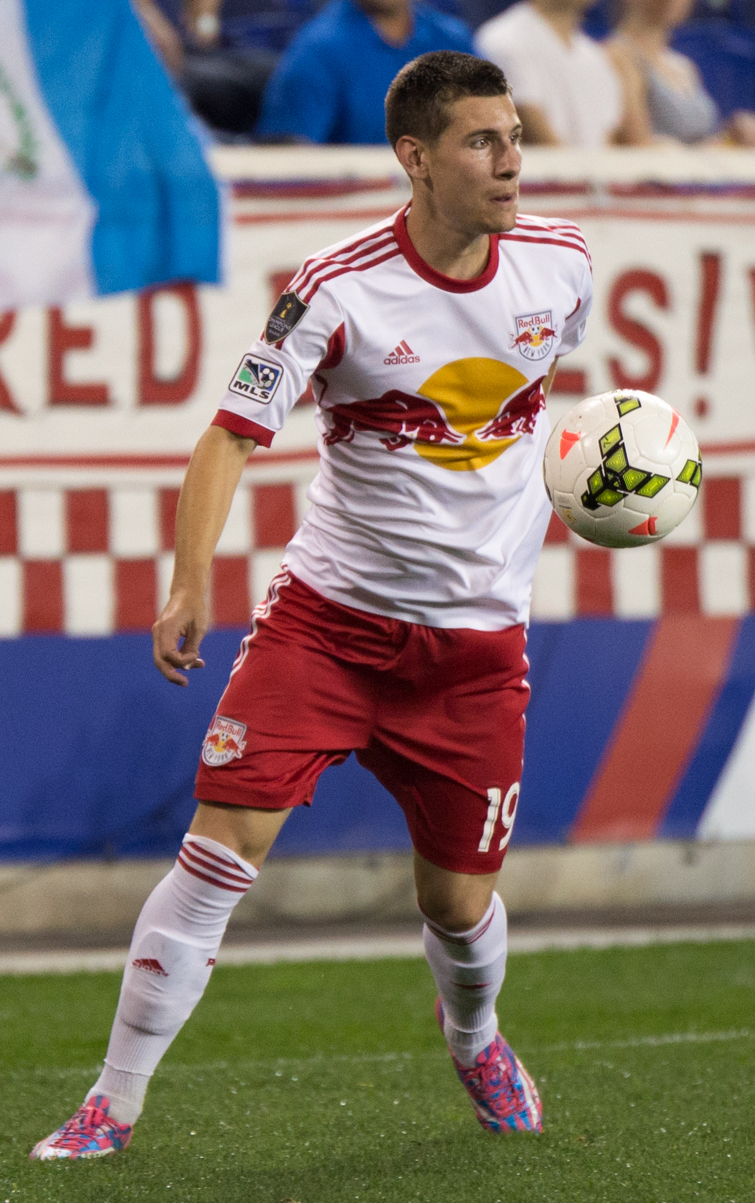
Stevenson playing for New York Red Bulls in 2014

On January 16, 2014, Stevenson was drafted in the second round (34th overall) of the 2014 MLS SuperDraft by the New York Red Bulls. Two months later, he signed a professional contract with the club. On August 26, 2014, Stevenson made his professional debut for the Red Bulls in a 2–0 win over Salvadoran club FAS in the CONCACAF Champions League.

Stevenson was waived by New York on February 13, 2015.

Stevenson signed with FC Cincinnati ahead of their inaugural 2016 season.

== Honors ==
=== University of Akron ===
- College Cup: 2010

=== Individual ===
- All-MAC Second team: 2012
- All-MAC First team: 2013
- All-Great Lakes Region First team: 2013
