= Derek Luke (soccer) =

American soccer player (born 1993)

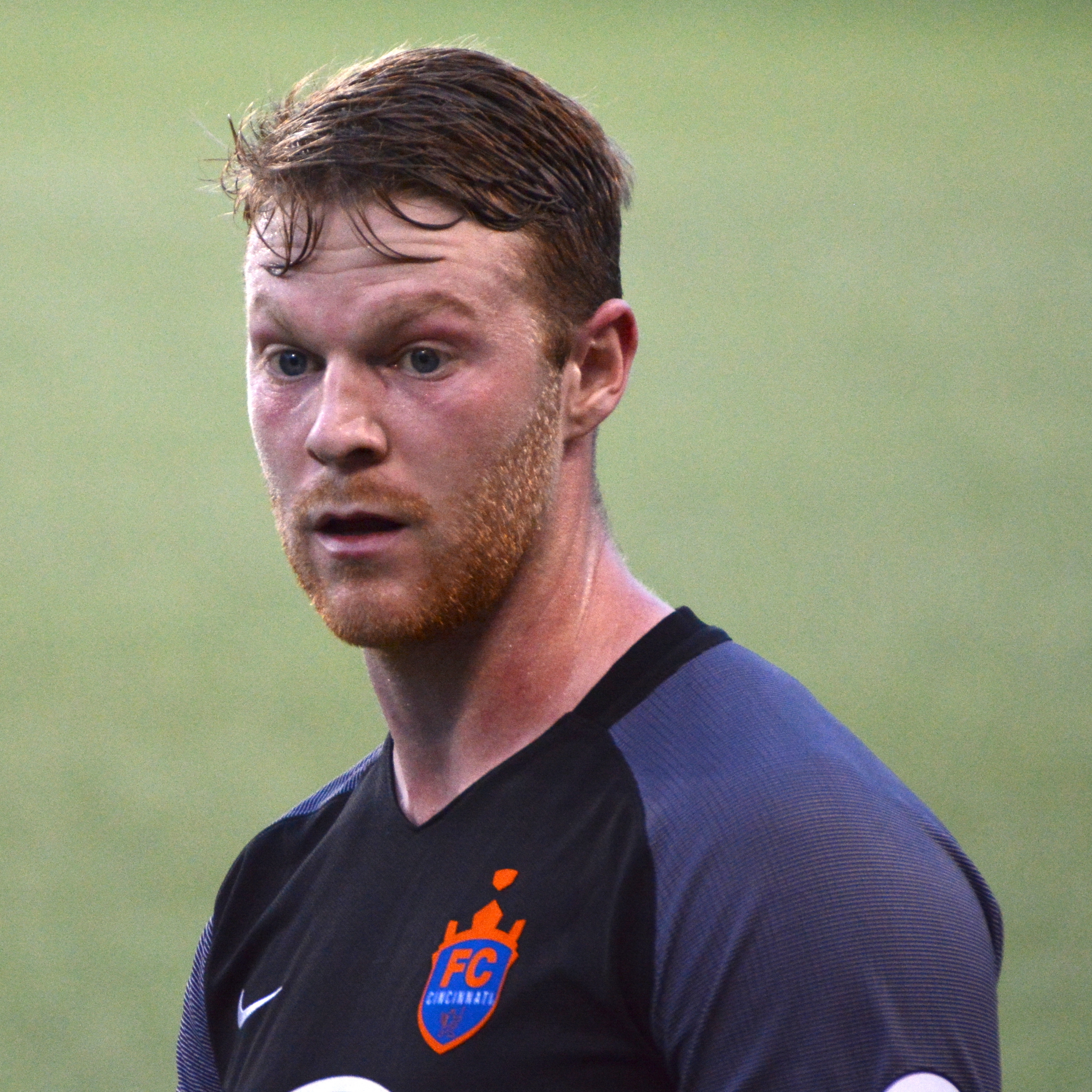
- Luke playing for FC Cincinnati in 2017

Personal information
- Date of birth: May 28, 1993 (age 33)
- Place of birth: Bridgewater Township, New Jersey, United States
- Height: 1.74 m (5 ft 9 in)
- Position: Defender

College career
Years	Team	Apps	(Gls)
2011–2014	Monmouth Hawks	61	(3)

Senior career*
Years	Team	Apps	(Gls)
2013	Central Jersey Spartans	9	(0)
2016–2017	FC Cincinnati	27	(0)
2018	Rio Grande Valley FC	4	(0)
- * Club domestic league appearances and goals as of 15:43, 16 October 2018 (UTC)

Derek Luke (born May 28, 1993) is an American professional soccer player who plays as a defender.

== Career ==
=== Youth and college ===
Luke attended Bridgewater-Raritan High School and played four years of college soccer at Monmouth University between 2011 and 2015.

=== Professional ===
Luke was signed by new United Soccer League club FC Cincinnati on February 15, 2016.

Luke was released from FC Cincinnati on June 30, 2017 due to medical issues.

Luke signed with Rio Grande Valley FC for the 2018 season.
