= Mitch Hildebrandt =

American soccer player

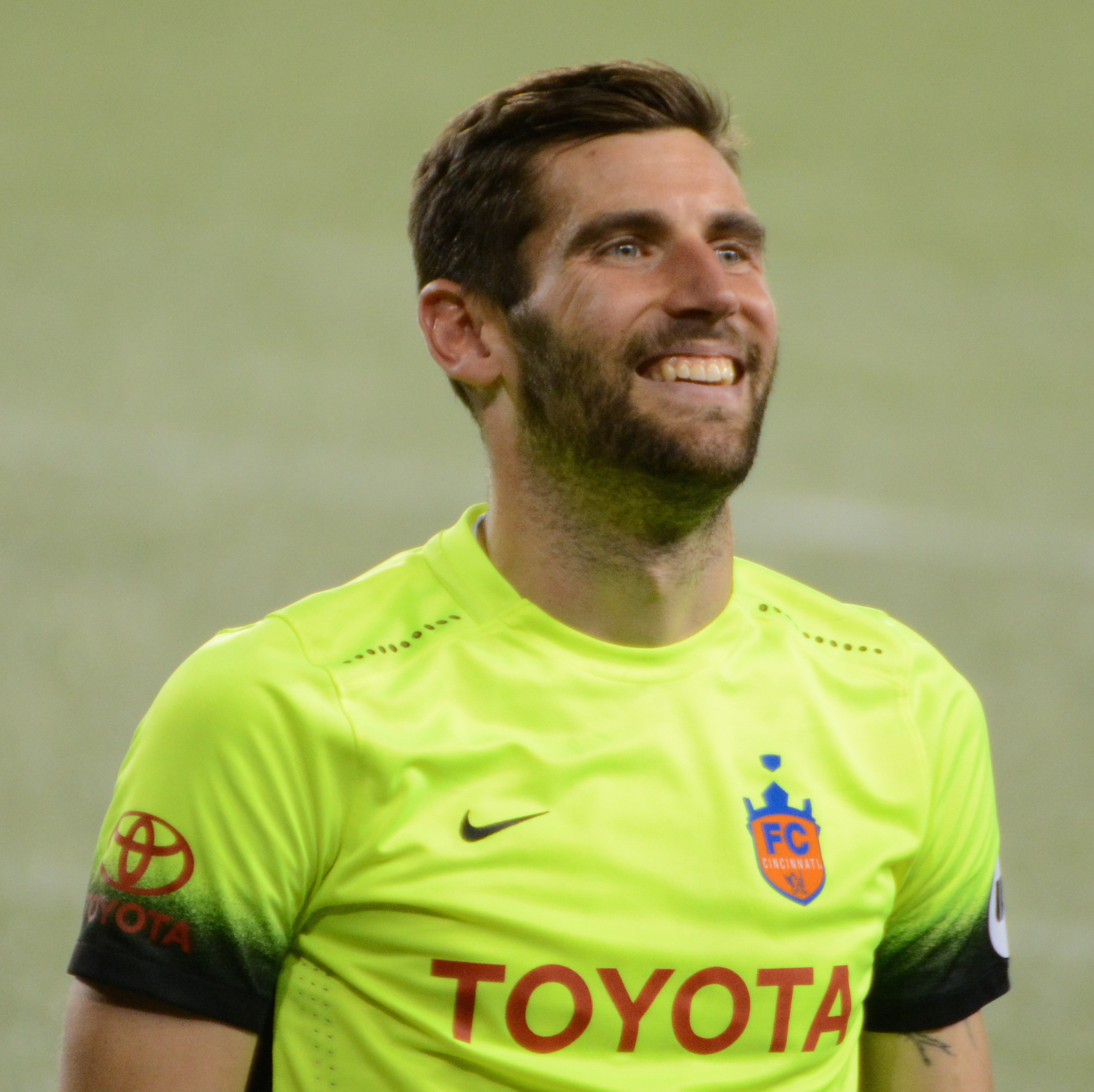
- Hildebrandt after an FC Cincinnati match in 2017

Personal information
- Full name: Mitchell A. Hildebrandt
- Date of birth: November 12, 1988 (age 38)
- Place of birth: Livonia, Michigan, United States
- Height: 1.86 m (6 ft 1 in)
- Position: Goalkeeper

Youth career
- 2004–2007: Michigan Wolves

College career
Years	Team	Apps	(Gls)
2008–2011	Oakland Golden Grizzlies	53	(0)

Senior career*
Years	Team	Apps	(Gls)
2008–2009	Kalamazoo Outrage	13	(0)
2010–2011	Michigan Bucks	32	(0)
2012–2015	Minnesota United FC	15	(0)
2016–2017	FC Cincinnati	61	(0)
2018	Atlanta United	0	(0)
2018	→ Atlanta United 2 (loan)	8	(0)
2020	Sporting Kansas City II	0	(0)

Managerial career
- 2020: Sporting Kansas City II (goalkeeping)
- 2021–2024: Michigan Wolves
- 2024: St. Louis City SC (assistant)
- 2025–: Philadelphia Union (assistant)
- * Club domestic league appearances and goals

Mitchell A. Hildebrandt (born November 12, 1988) is an American former professional soccer goalkeeper. He is currently an assistant coach for Philadelphia Union.

== Career ==
=== College and amateur ===
Hildebrandt played his entire college career at Oakland University. He redshirted in 2007. In his first season as a starter for Oakland in 2009, Hildebrandt finished with seven clean sheets and a 0.73 goals against average and was named to the All-Summit League first team. He had another solid year in 2010, finishing with a 1.24 goals against average and 0.77 save percentage and was again named to the All-Summit League first team. Hildebrandt went on to be named to the All-Summit League second team in his senior season in 2011 and finished his career with a total of 249 saves and 19 clean sheets.

During his time in college, Hildebrandt also spent time in the USL Premier Development League with Kalamazoo Outrage and Michigan Bucks.

=== Professional ===
On April 3, 2012, Hildebrandt signed a professional contract with Minnesota Stars FC (renamed Minnesota United FC in 2013) of the North American Soccer League. He made his professional debut on May 25, 2012, recording up a clean sheet in a 0–0 draw with the Atlanta Silverbacks.

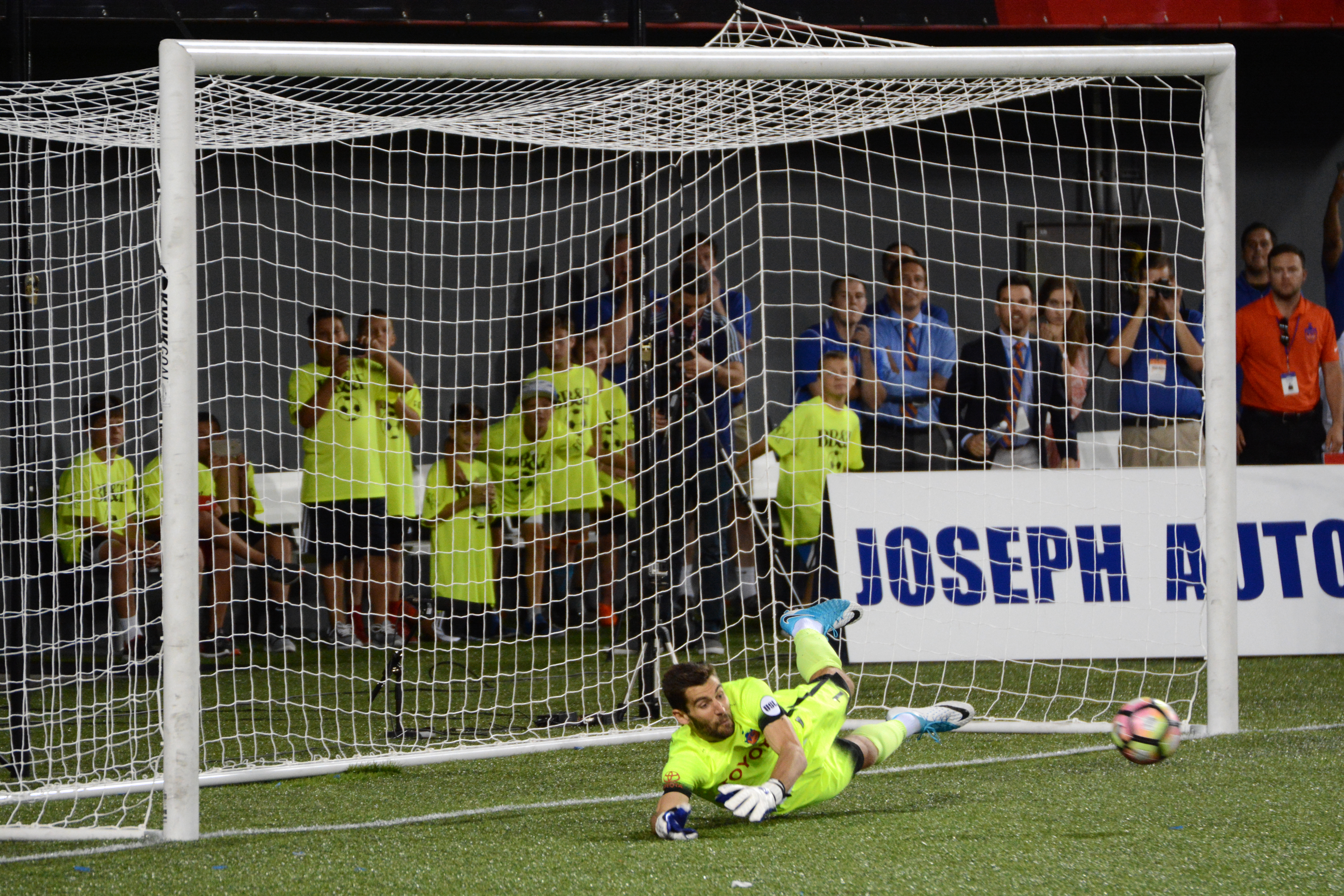
Hildebrandt saves a shot by Chicago Fire's Arturo Álvarez during a penalty shoot-out in the 2017 U.S. Open Cup.

In 2016, Hildebrandt moved to FC Cincinnati in the United Soccer League. Fans of Cincinnati would frequently chant "Mitch Says No" when Hildebrandt made a save. Hildebrandt agreed to a multi-year contract with Cincinnati following the 2016 season. He received national attention for his performance in the 2017 U.S. Open Cup semi-final against Chicago Fire, making three saves in the deciding penalty shoot-out.

Hildebrandt played for FC Cincinnati for two seasons before moving up to Major League Soccer, signing with Atlanta United FC on December 1, 2017. As of June 27, 2018, Hildebrandt had yet to come off the bench for Atlanta's first team, but he had made two appearances for Atlanta United 2 in the USL.

Hildebrandt was released by Atlanta at the end of its 2018 season.

On February 23, 2019, Hildebrandt announced via his social media accounts that he was retiring from professional soccer. He then joined Chicago Fire FC as a video scout.

In January 2020, Hildebrandt was appointed goalkeeping coach for Sporting Kansas City II of the USL Championship. Hildebrant came out of retirement to join the Sporting Kansas City II playing roster on September 16, 2020, becoming the first ever player-coach for the club.

Following the conclusion of the 2020 USL Championship season, Hildebrandt returned to Michigan to coach with the Michigan Wolves SC academy where he had played as a youth.

In the 2025 preseason, he joined Philadelphia Union as an assistant coach.

== Honors ==
Individual

- USL All-League Team: 2016
- USL Goalkeeper of the Year: 2016
