= Álvaro Antón (footballer, born 1994) =

Spanish footballer

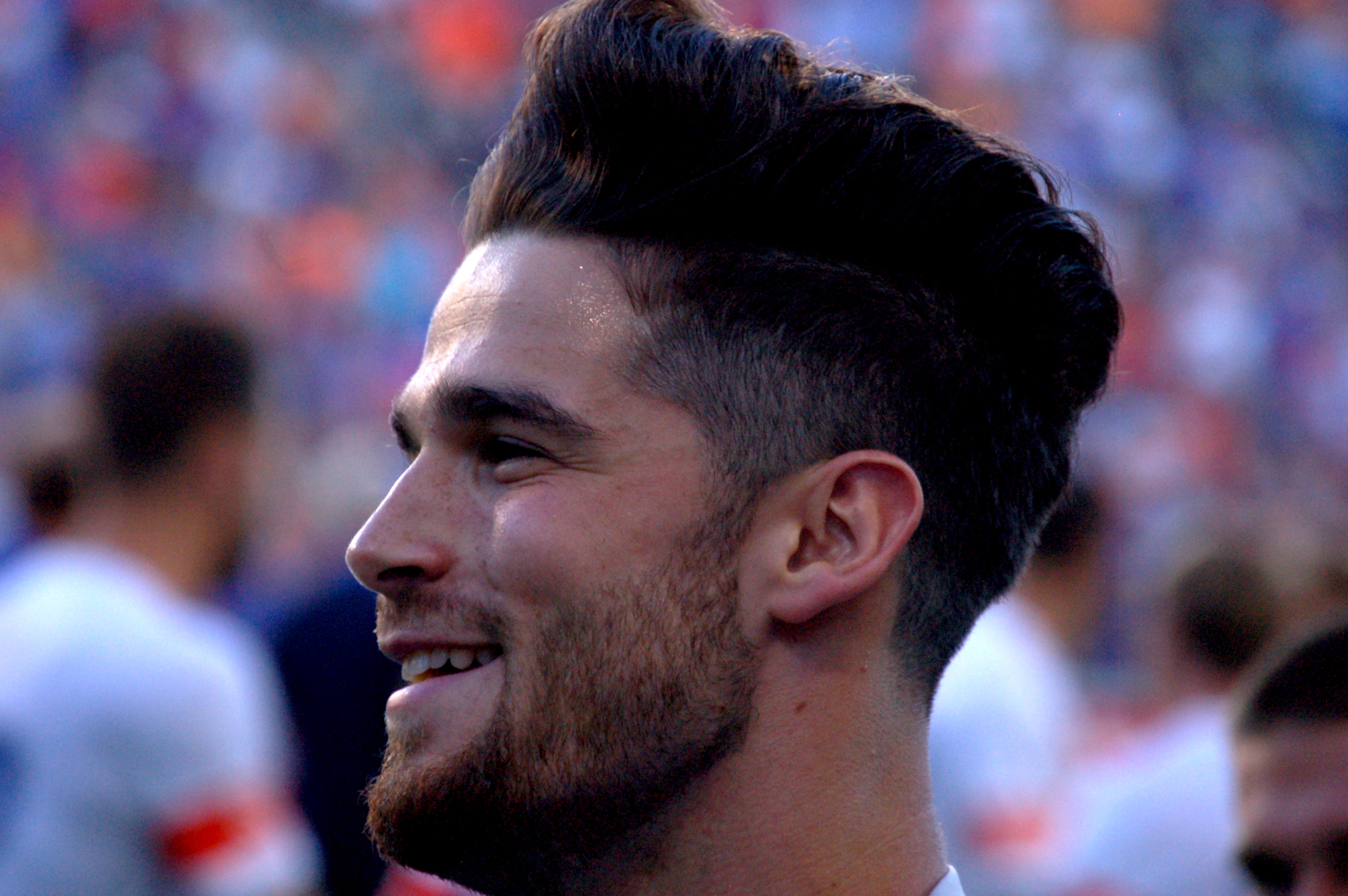
- Antón in 2016

Personal information
- Date of birth: 18 May 1994 (age 32)
- Place of birth: Madrid, Spain
- Height: 6 ft 1 in (1.85 m)
- Position: Winger

Youth career
- 2011–2012: Las Rozas
- 2012–2013: Osasuna

Senior career*
Years	Team	Apps	(Gls)
2013	Osasuna B	0	(0)
2013	→ Valle de Egüés (loan)	11	(6)
2013–2014	Alcorcón B	31	(1)
2014–2015	Alzira	28	(7)
2016	FC Cincinnati	4	(0)
- * Club domestic league appearances and goals as of 11 September 2016

Álvaro Antón Ripoll (born 18 May 1994) is a Spanish footballer who plays as a right winger. In 2014, he played for UD Alzira in the group VI of the 2014–15 Tercera División, the fourth division of Spanish football. He played four times for FC Cincinnati in the 2016 USL season.
