= Charlie Luke (Australian footballer) =

Australian rules footballer

Personal information
- Full name: Charles John Luke
- Born: 22 June 1911
- Died: 1 January 1998 (aged 86)
- Original team: Phillip Island
- Height: 177 cm (5 ft 10 in)
- Weight: 68 kg (150 lb)

Playing career^{1}
Years	Club	Games (Goals)
1937–1939	Footscray	18 (46)
- ^{1} Playing statistics correct to the end of 1939.

Charles John Luke (22 June 1911 – 1 January 1998) was an Australian rules footballer who played with Footscray in the Victorian Football League (VFL).

Luke, a forward, came to Footscray from Phillip Island. He played 13 of his 18 career games in 1937 and kicked at least two goals in each of his home and away season appearances that year. His final season tally, 44 goals, was enough to top Footscray's goal-kicking. He spent much of the 1939 season playing for Yarraville and transferred to Gippsland club Morwell the following year, as captain-coach.
