= List of FC Cincinnati records and statistics =

FC Cincinnati is an American professional soccer club based in Cincinnati, Ohio, that competes in Major League Soccer (MLS) since 2019. For its first three seasons, the club played in United Soccer League (USL), now known as the USL championship.

This is a list of club records for FC Cincinnati, which dates back their inaugural season USL season in 2016, and continues through present day.

== Player records ==
=== Appearances ===
As of match played August 7, 2026

Rank	Player	Period	League	Playoffs	U.S. Open Cup	Leagues Cup	CONCACAF Champions Cup	Total
1	(Japan) Yūya Kubo	2020–2025	146	12 (Note: Includes one appearance in MLS is Back Tournament knockout stage)	6	8 (Note: Includes one appearance in 2022 Leagues Cup Showcase)	7	179
2	(United States) **Nick Hagglund**	2019–present	156	5	8	4	1	174
3	(United States) **Roman Celentano**	2022–present	136	13	1	4	10	164
4	**(Jamaica) Alvas Powell**	2019; 2022–present	119	11	7	7	10	154
5	(Argentina) Luciano Acosta	2021–2024	125	9	7	6	4	151
6	(Nigeria) **Obinna Nwobodo**	2022–present	111	12	4	10	10	147
7	(United States) Brandon Vázquez	2020–2023	112	6	5	4	0	127
8	(Argentina) Álvaro Barreal	2020–2025	104	6	7	4	0	121
9	(United States) Corben Bone	2016–2019	96	4	10	0	0	110
10	(Czech Republic) **Pavel Bucha**	2024–present	83	7	0	9	10	109

=== Goals ===
As of match played August 7, 2026

Rank	Player	Period	League	Playoffs	U.S. Open Cup	Leagues Cup	CONCACAF Champions Cup	Total
1	(Argentina) Luciano Acosta	2021–2024	48	3	1	1	1	54
2	(United States) Brandon Vázquez	2020–2023	32	2	3	6 (Note: Includes one goal in 2022 Leagues Cup Showcase)	0	43
3	**(Brazil) Evander**	2025–present	29	0	0	3	2	34
4	(Brazil) Brenner	2021–2023; 2025	31	2	0	0	0	33
4	**(Togo) Kévin Denkey**	2025–present	26	1	0	0	6	33
6	(Denmark) Danni König	2017–2018	22	0	0	0	0	22
6	(Argentina) Emmanuel Ledesma	2018–2019	22	0	0	0	0	22
8	(Argentina) Álvaro Barreal	2020–2025	13	2	4	0	0	19
8	(Japan) Yūya Kubo	2020–2025	15	0	2	2	0	19
8	(Czech Republic) **Pavel Bucha**	2024–present	11	0	0	5	3	19

=== Clean sheets ===
As of match played August 7, 2026

Rank	Player	Period	League	Playoffs	U.S. Open Cup	Leagues Cup	CONCACAF Champions Cup	Total
1	(United States) **Roman Celentano**	2022–present	36	5	1	1	4	47
2	(United States) Mitch Hildebrandt	2016–2017	18	0	4	0	0	22
3	(United States) Spencer Richey	2018–2021	10	0	1	0	0	11
3	(Poland) Przemysław Tytoń	2019–2021	11	0	0	0	0	11
5	(United States) Evan Newton	2018	9	0	0	0	0	9
6	(Netherlands) Kenneth Vermeer	2021–2022	4	0	0	0	0	4
7	(United States) Alec Kann	2022–2025	1	0	2	0	0	3
7	**(United States) Evan Louro**	2022–present	1	0	0	1	1	3
9	(Guam) Dallas Jaye	2016–2017	1	0	1	0	0	2

Bolded players are currently on the FC Cincinnati roster.

== Club records ==
Record USL points total: 77 (2018)

Lowest USL points total: 46 (2017) (Source:)

Record MLS points total: 69 (2023)

Lowest MLS points total: 16 (2020)

=== Competition records ===
Record competitive matches played in a season: 46 (2023)

Record overall points total: 77 (2018)

Highest finish in USL regular season: 1st (2018)

Lowest finish in USL regular season: 14th (2017)

Best finish in USL playoffs: Conference semifinals (2018)

Highest finish in MLS Supporters' Shield: 1st (2023)

Lowest finish in MLS Supporters' Shield: 27th (2021) (Source:)

Best finish in MLS Cup playoffs: Conference finals (2023)

Best finish in U.S. Open Cup: Semi-finals (2017, 2023)

Best finish in Leagues Cup: Round of 16 (2024)

Best finish in CONCACAF Champions Cup: Round of 16 (2024, 2025, 2026)

=== Attendance ===
Record USL regular season attendance: 31,478 (September 29, 2018 vs Indy Eleven)

Record USL playoff attendance: 30,187 (October 2, 2016 vs Charleston Battery)

Record MLS regular season attendance: 32,250 (Nippert Stadium MLS capacity, on two occasions:

1. March 17, 2019 vs Portland Timbers
2. June 22, 2019 vs LA Galaxy )

Record MLS playoff attendance: 25,513 (TQL Stadium capacity, on four occasions:

1. November 25, 2023 vs Philadelphia Union
2. December 2, 2023 vs Columbus Crew
3. November 8, 2025 vs Columbus Crew
4. November 23, 2025 vs Inter Miami CF)

Record U.S. Open Cup attendance: 33,250 (August 15, 2017 vs New York Red Bulls, semi-finals)

Record Leagues Cup attendance: 24,860 (July 31, 2024 vs Monterrey, league phase)

Record CONCACAF Champions Cup attendance: 21,280 (February 26, 2025 vs Motagua, round of 16)

Overall attendance record: 35,061 (July 16, 2016 vs Crystal Palace, friendly)

Record crowd played in front of: 70,382 (March 10, 2019 at Atlanta United FC, MLS regular season)

=== Record wins ===
Record USL regular season win: 5–1 at Atlanta United 2, August 22, 2018

Record MLS regular season win: 6–0 vs San Jose Earthquakes, September 10, 2022

Record MLS playoff win: 3–0 vs New York Red Bulls, October 29, 2023

Record U.S. Open Cup win: 4–1 (a.e.t.) vs Detroit City FC, May 16, 2018

Record Leagues Cup win: by two goals, on three occasions:

1. 4–2 vs New York City FC, August 5, 2024
2. 3–1 vs Pachuca, August 4, 2026
3. 2–0 vs Pumas UNAM, August 7, 2026

Record CONCACAF Champions Cup win: 9–0 vs O&M, February 25, 2026

=== Record losses ===
Record USL regular season loss: 0–5 at Louisville City FC, August 12, 2017

Record USL playoff loss: 0–3 at Tampa Bay Rowdies, October 21, 2017

Record MLS regular season loss: 1–7 at Minnesota United FC, June 29, 2019

Record MLS playoff loss: 0–4 on two occasions:

1. November 2, 2025 at Columbus Crew
2. November 23, 2025 vs Inter Miami CF

Record U.S. Open Cup loss: 1–5 at New England Revolution, May 11, 2022 (Source:)

Record Leagues Cup loss: 2–4 vs Philadelphia Union, August 13, 2024

Record CONCACAF Champions Cup loss: 1–5 at Tigres UANL, March 19, 2026

=== Firsts ===
First match: 2–2 vs Knattspyrnufélag Reykjavíkur (IMG Suncoast Pro Classic), February 21, 2016

First USL match: 0–1 at Charleston Battery, March 26, 2016

First USL goal: Andrew Wiedeman (1–0, 25'), April 3, 2016 at Bethlehem Steel FC

First USL win: 2–1 at Bethlehem Steel FC, April 3, 2016

First USL playoff match: 1–2 vs Charleston Battery, October 2, 2016

First USL playoff goal: Eric Stevenson (1–0, 19') October 2, 2016

First MLS match: 1–4 at Seattle Sounders FC, March 2, 2019

First MLS goal: Leonardo Bertone (1–0, 13'), March 2, 2019 at Seattle Sounders FC

First MLS win: 3–0 vs Portland Timbers, March 17, 2019

First MLS Cup playoff match: 2–1 at New York Red Bulls, October 15, 2022

First MLS Cup playoff goal: Luciano Acosta (1–1, 74'), October 15, 2022

First MLS Cup playoff win: 2–1 at New York Red Bulls, October 15, 2022

First U.S. Open Cup match: 2–1 vs Indy Eleven NPSL, May 18, 2016

First U.S. Open Cup goal: Omar Cummings (1–0, 36' (p)), May 18, 2016 vs Indy Eleven NPSL

First U.S. Open Cup win: 2–1 vs Indy Eleven NPSL, May 18, 2016

First Leagues Cup match: (Note: 2022 Showcase match not counted in competitive record) 3–3 (4–2 p) vs Sporting Kansas City, July 23, 2023

First Leagues Cup goal: John Pulskamp (1–2, [o.g.]) vs Sporting Kansas City

First Leagues Cup win: 3–1 vs Guadalajara, July 28, 2023 (match postponed, completed July 29, 2023)

First CONCACAF Champions Cup match: 2–0 at Cavalier, February 22, 2024 (Source:)

First CONCACAF Champions Cup goal: Sérgio Santos (1–0, 45+5') February 22, 2024

First CONCACAF Champions Cup win: 2–0 at Cavalier, February 22, 2024 (Source:)

== International record ==
=== Record by competition ===
As of August 11, 2026

International competitions							
Competition	Pld	W	D	L	GF	GA	GD
CONCACAF Champions Cup	12	6	2	4	30	14	+16
Leagues Cup	13	6	4	3	27	21	+6
Total	25	12	6	7	57	35	+22

=== By nation ===
As of August 11, 2026 (Includes: Leagues Cup and CONCACAF Champions Cup)

Nation	Pld	W	D	L	GF	GA	GD
Mexico	15	6	3	6	24	24	0
Honduras	2	1	1	0	5	2	+3
Jamaica	2	2	0	0	6	0	+6
United States	4	1	2	1	10	10	0
Dominican Republic	2	2	0	0	13	0	+13

=== Matches ===
All results (home and away) list FC Cincinnati's goal tally first.

Season	Competition	Round	Opponent	Home	Away	Aggregate
2022	Leagues Cup	Showcase	(Mexico) Guadalajara	3–1		
2023	Leagues Cup	Group stage	(United States) Sporting Kansas City	3–3 (4–2 p)		
2023	Leagues Cup	Group stage	(Mexico) Guadalajara	3–1		
2023	Leagues Cup	Round of 32	(United States) Nashville SC	1–1 (4–5 p)		
2024	CONCACAF Champions Cup	Round one	(Jamaica) Cavalier	4–0	2–0	6–0
2024	CONCACAF Champions Cup	Round of 16	(Mexico) Monterrey	0–1	1–2	1–3
2024	Leagues Cup	Group stage	(Mexico) Querétaro	1–0		
2024	Leagues Cup	Group stage	(United States) New York City FC	4–2		
2024	Leagues Cup	Round of 32	(Mexico) Santos Laguna	1–1 (6–5 p)		
2024	Leagues Cup	Round of 16	(United States) Philadelphia Union	2–4		
2025	CONCACAF Champions Cup	Round one	(Honduras) Motagua	1–1	4–1	5–2
2025	CONCACAF Champions Cup	Round of 16	(Mexico) Tigres UANL	1–1	1–3	2–4
2025	Leagues Cup	League phase	(Mexico) Monterrey	3–2		
2025	Leagues Cup	League phase	(Mexico) Juárez	2–2 (4–5 p)		
2025	Leagues Cup	League phase	(Mexico) Guadalajara	1–2		
2026	CONCACAF Champions Cup	Round one	(Dominican Republic) O&M	9–0	4–0	13–0
2026	CONCACAF Champions Cup	Round of 16	(Mexico) Tigres UANL	3–0	1–5	4–5
2026	Leagues Cup	League phase	(Mexico) Pachuca	3–1		
2026	Leagues Cup	League phase	(Mexico) Pumas UNAM	2–0		
2026	Leagues Cup	League phase	(Mexico) Atlas	1–2		

== Honors ==
=== Major ===
- Supporters' Shield
  - Winners (1): 2023
  - Runners-up (1): 2025
- USL Regular Season Championship (Note: Known since 2023 as the Players' Shield)
  - Winners (1): 2018

=== Friendly/Unofficial ===
- IMG Suncoast Pro Classic
  - Winners (1): 2016
- River Cities Cup
  - Winners (1): 2016
- Queen City Cup
  - Winners (2): 2016, 2017

== Individual award winners ==
=== United Soccer League ===
==== USL Most Valuable Player ====
The following players have received the USL Most Valuable Player (MVP) Award while playing for FC Cincinnati:
- (United States) Sean Okoli – 2016
- (Argentina) Emmanuel Ledesma – 2018

==== USL Coach of the Year ====
The following coaches have received the USL Coach of the Year Award while coaching for FC Cincinnati:
- (South Africa) Alan Koch – 2018

==== USL Defender of the Year ====
The following players have received the USL Defender of the Year Award while playing for FC Cincinnati:
- (United States) Forrest Lasso – 2018

==== USL Goalkeeper of the Year ====
The following players have received the USL Goalkeeper of the Year Award while playing for FC Cincinnati:
- (United States) Mitch Hildebrandt – 2016

==== USL Golden Boot ====
The following players have won the USL Golden Boot Award while playing for FC Cincinnati:
- (United States) Sean Okoli – 2016

==== USL Assists Champion ====
The following players have won the USL Assists Champion Award while playing for FC Cincinnati:
- (Argentina) Emmanuel Ledesma – 2018

==== USL Golden Glove ====
The following players have won the USL Golden Glove Award while playing for FC Cincinnati:
- (United States) Evan Newton – 2018

==== USL All-League First Team ====
The following players have been in the USL All-League First Team while playing for FC Cincinnati:

- (United States) Mitch Hildebrandt – 2016
- (Australia) Harrison Delbridge – 2016
- (United States) Sean Okoli – 2016
- (Australia) Harrison Delbridge (2) – 2017
- (Argentina) Emmanuel Ledesma – 2018
- (United States) Forrest Lasso – 2018

==== USL All-League Second Team ====
The following players have been in the USL All-League Second Team while playing for FC Cincinnati:

- (United States) Corben Bone – 2018

=== Major League Soccer ===
==== MLS Most Valuable Player ====
The following players have received the Landon Donovan MVP Award while playing for FC Cincinnati:

- (Argentina) Luciano Acosta – 2023

==== MLS Best XI ====
The following players have been in the MLS Best XI while playing for FC Cincinnati:

- (United States) Brandon Vázquez – 2022
- (Argentina) Luciano Acosta – 2022
- (Argentina) Luciano Acosta (2) – 2023
- (United States) Matt Miazga – 2023
- (Argentina) Luciano Acosta (3) – 2024
- (Brazil) Evander – 2025

==== MLS Defender of the Year ====
The following players have received the MLS Defender of the Year Award while playing for FC Cincinnati:

- (United States) Matt Miazga – 2023

==== MLS Comeback Player of the Year ====
The following players have received the MLS Comeback Player of the Year Award while playing for FC Cincinnati:

- (United States) Nick Hagglund – 2025

==== MLS Coach of the Year ====
The following coaches have received the MLS Sigi Schmid Coach of the Year Award while coaching for FC Cincinnati:

- (United States) Pat Noonan – 2023

==== MLS Save of the Year ====
The following players have received the MLS Save of the Year Award while playing for FC Cincinnati:

- (United States) Roman Celentano – 2023
- (United States) Roman Celentano (2) – 2025

==== MLS Goal of the Year ====
The following players have received the MLS Goal of the Year Award while playing for FC Cincinnati:

- (Argentina) Luciano Acosta – 2023
- (Argentina) Luca Orellano – 2024

==== MLS All-Star Game captains ====
The following players have been selected as captain for the MLS All-Star Game while playing for FC Cincinnati:

- (Argentina) Luciano Acosta – 2023
- (Argentina) Luciano Acosta (2) – 2024
- (Brazil) Evander – 2025

==== MLS All-Star Game selections ====
The following players have been selected for the MLS All-Star Game while playing for FC Cincinnati:

- (United States) Brandon Vázquez – 2022
- (Argentina) Luciano Acosta – 2022
- (Argentina) Luciano Acosta (2) – 2023
- (Argentina) Álvaro Barreal – 2023
- (United States) Matt Miazga – 2023
- (Argentina) Luciano Acosta (3) – 2024
- (Argentina) Luca Orellano – 2024
- (United States) Miles Robinson – 2024 (Note: Miles Robinson was named to the 2024 MLS All-Star roster, but withdrew prior to the match due to his participation in the 2024 Olympics.)
- (Brazil) Evander – 2025
- (United States) Miles Robinson (2) – 2025
- (Brazil) Evander (2) – 2026

=== FIFA ===
==== Puskás Award nominees ====
The following players have had a goal nominated for a FIFA Puskás Award while playing for FC Cincinnati:
- (Argentina) Álvaro Barreal – 2023

== Transfer history ==
=== Designated Player history ===
Player	Season(s)	Previous club
(Nigeria) Fanendo Adi	2019	Portland Timbers
(Costa Rica) Allan Cruz	2019	(Costa Rica) Herediano
(Japan) Yūya Kubo	2020–2022	(Belgium) Gent
(Netherlands) Jürgen Locadia	2020–2021	(England) Brighton & Hove Albion
(Argentina) Luciano Acosta	2021–2024	(Mexico) Atlas
(Brazil) Brenner	2021–2023	(Brazil) São Paulo
(Nigeria) **Obinna Nwobodo**	2022–2024	(Turkey) Göztepe
(Gabon) Aaron Boupendza	2023–2024	(Saudi Arabia) Al-Shabab
(United States) Nicholas Gioacchini	2024	(Italy) Como
(Togo) **Kévin Denkey**	2025–2026	(Belgium) Cercle Brugge
(Brazil) **Evander**	2025–2026	Portland Timbers
(United States) **Miles Robinson**	2026	Atlanta United FC

=== Highest transfer fees paid (USD) ===
Rank	Player	Fee (USD)	Previous club
1	(Togo) **Kévin Denkey**	16.2M	(Belgium) Cercle Brugge
2	(Brazil) Brenner	13M	(Brazil) São Paulo
3	(Brazil) **Evander** (Note: The transfer of Evander from Portland Timbers technically falls under MLS designation as "cash for player trade" rather than a traditional transfer.)	12M	Portland Timbers
4	(Gabon) Aaron Boupendza	7M	(Saudi Arabia) Al-Shabab
5	(Ghana) Isaac Atanga	4.2M	(Denmark) Nordsjælland

=== Highest transfer fees received (USD) ===
Rank	Player	Fee (USD)	New club
1	(Brazil) Brenner	10M	(Italy) Udinese
2	(United States) Brandon Vázquez	7.5M	(Mexico) Monterrey
3	(Argentina) Luciano Acosta (Note: The transfer of Luciano Acosta to FC Dallas technically falls under MLS designation as "cash for player trade" rather than a traditional transfer.)	5M	FC Dallas
4	(Argentina) Álvaro Barreal	4M	(Brazil) Santos
5	(United States) Frankie Amaya	950K	New York Red Bulls

Bolded players are currently on the FC Cincinnati roster.
