= 2018 FC Cincinnati season =

FC Cincinnati
2018 season
- General manager: Jeff Berding
- Head coach: Alan Koch
- Stadium: Nippert Stadium
- USL: 1st (Eastern Conference)
- USL Playoffs: Conference Semifinals
- U.S. Open Cup: 4th round
- Top goalscorer: Emmanuel Ledesma (16)
- Highest home attendance: 31,478 (September 29 vs. Indy)
- Lowest home attendance: 22,532 (May 5 vs. Atlanta 2)
- Average home league attendance: 25,717
Home colors	Away colors	Third colors

The 2018 FC Cincinnati season was the club's third season of existence, and their third in the United Soccer League (USL). It was FC Cincinnati's second season as a second-tier team in the U.S. soccer pyramid, as the United States Soccer Federation provisionally promoted the USL from Division III to Division II for the 2017 season. FC Cincinnati played in the Eastern Conference of the USL.

This was the final season of the club's USL incarnation. On May 29, 2018, Major League Soccer awarded the FCC ownership group an expansion franchise, which began play in MLS under the FC Cincinnati name in 2019.

On September 26, 2018, the club clinched their first USL Regular Season Championship with a 4–1 victory over the Richmond Kickers.

== Club ==
=== Coaching staff ===
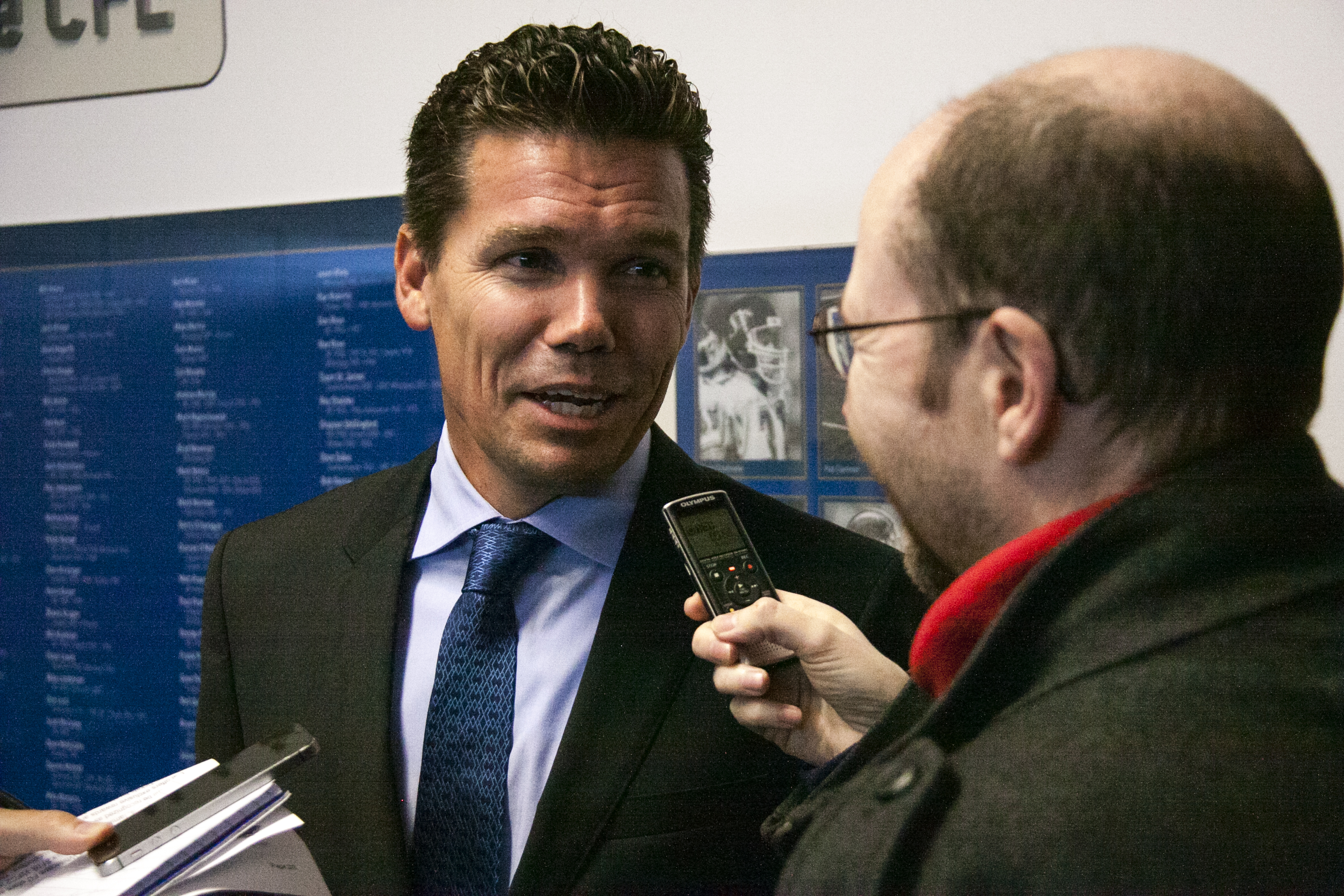
Alan Koch started as head coach in 2017.

Position	Staff
Head coach	(South Africa) Alan Koch
Assistant coach	(France) Yoann Damet
Goalkeeper coach	(United States) Jack Stern
Technical director	(United States) Luke Sassano
Athletic Trainer	(United States) Aaron Powell
Strength & Conditioning	(United States) Austin Berry
UC Health	(United States) Dr. Angelo Colosimo (United States) Dr. Brian Grawe

=== Roster ===
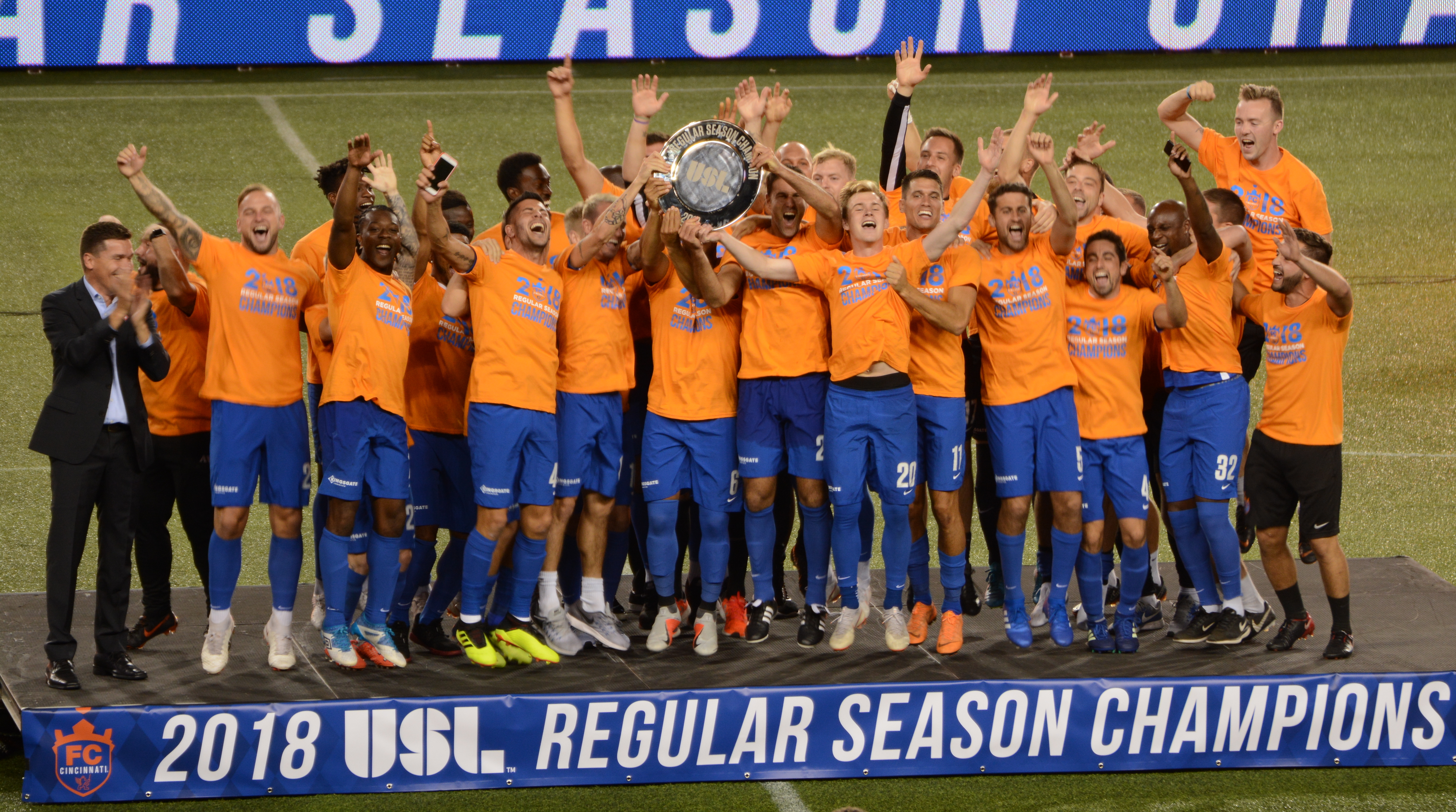
The players and staff celebrate winning the USL 2018 regular season trophy.

On October 25, 2017, general manager Jeff Berding held a press conference to make the first announcements about the 2018 roster. The return of nine players from 2017 was confirmed at this press conference: Matt Bahner, Kenney Walker, Danni König, Corben Bone, Jimmy McLaughlin, Garrett Halfhill, Justin Hoyte, Sem de Wit, and Josu. Six additional players from the 2017 roster—Austin Berry, Mitch Hildebrandt, Djiby Fall, Harrison Delbridge, Andrew Wiedeman, and Paul Nicholson—were mentioned as still under consideration for 2018, pending contract discussions and future announcements. Berding also confirmed they would not renew contracts or exercise options for any other former players. In the following weeks, Djiby Fall implied he would not be returning via Twitter, and Paul Nicholson announced his retirement from professional soccer.

The club began announcing new signings in November 2017. The team signed Israeli defender Dekel Keinan on November 10, as well as Canadian forward Daniel Haber on November 15.

On April 16, 2018, the club announced they had mutually agreed to part ways with defender Josu.

On April 17, 2018, the club announced they had reach an agreement for the free release of defender Garrett Halfhill. Halfhill subsequently join the New York Cosmos B of the NPSL.

On July 9, 2018, the club announced the free transfer of forward Daniel Haber to Ottawa Fury FC.

On July 30, 2018, forward Fanendo Adi was acquired from the Portland Timbers as the first MLS designated player for FC Cincinnati. The club also announced the acquisition of midfielder Fatai Alashe from the San Jose Earthquakes.

On August 1, 2018, the club announced the acquisition of defender Pa Konate from Serie A S.P.A.L.

Where a player has not declared an international allegiance, nation is determined by place of birth.

No.	Position	Player	Nation
1	GK	USA	Evan Newton
2	DF	USA	Matt Bahner
3	DF	USA	Forrest Lasso
4	MF	USA	Tyler Gibson
5	MF	USA	Nazmi Albadawi
6	MF	USA	Kenney Walker
7	FW	USA	Russell Cicerone
9	FW	NGR	Fanendo Adi
10	FW	GUY	Emery Welshman
11	FW	DEN	Danni König
12	DF	SWE	Pa Konate (on loan from SPAL)
13	MF	SLE	Michael Lahoud
16	MF	IRL	Richie Ryan
17	GK	CAN	Mark Village
18	GK	USA	Spencer Richey (on loan from Vancouver Whitecaps FC)
19	MF	USA	Corben Bone
20	MF	USA	Jimmy McLaughlin
21	DF	ISR	Dekel Keinan
23	DF	USA	Blake Smith
24	FW	ENG	Tomi Ameobi
27	MF	USA	Fatai Alashe (on loan from San Jose Earthquakes)
29	DF	IRL	Paddy Barrett
32	DF	TTO	Justin Hoyte
45	MF	ARG	Emmanuel Ledesma
51	DF	NED	Sem de Wit

== Competitions ==
Win Draw Loss

=== USL ===
==== Results Table ====
Matchday	1	2	3	4	5	6	7	8	9	10	11	12	13	14	15	16	17	18	19	20	21	22	23	24	25	26	27	28	29	30	31	32	33	34
Stadium	A	A	H	A	H	A	A	H	A	H	H	A	A	H	H	A	H	A	H	H	H	H	H	H	A	A	H	A	H	A	A	H	A	A
Result	W	W	L	D	D	W	W	W	L	W	L	W	W	D	W	D	W	D	W	W	W	D	W	W	W	W	W	W	W	W	W	W	D	D

Source: MLS
A = Away; H = Home; W = Win; D = Draw; L = Loss

|text_H=Home|text_A=Away

March 17, 2018 1	Charleston Battery	0–1	FC Cincinnati	Charleston, South Carolina
7:00 EDT	Guerra (yellow card) 51' van Schiak (yellow card) 80'; Griffith (red card) 90+2'	CIN Report; CHS Report	Smith 18'; Laing (yellow card) 63'; Lasso (yellow card) 85'; König (yellow card) 90+2'; Ryan (yellow card) 90+7'	Stadium: MUSC Health Stadium; Attendance: 0 Referee: Elvis Osmanovic

March 31, 2018 2	Indy Eleven	0–1	FC Cincinnati	Indianapolis, Indiana
7:00 EDT	Ferreira (yellow card) 41'; McInerney (yellow card) 45+4'	CIN Report; IND Report	Welshman 26'; Keinan (yellow card) 54'; Lasso (yellow card) 74'	Stadium: Lucas Oil Stadium; Attendance: 17,535; Referee: Malik Badawi

April 7, 2018 3	FC Cincinnati	0–1	Louisville City FC	Cincinnati, Ohio
7:00PM ET	Ledesma (yellow card) 35'; Keinan (yellow card) 61'; Laing (yellow card) 76'	CIN Report; LOU Report; Box Score	Lancaster 13' (yellow card) 47'; Ilić (yellow card) 90+4'	Stadium: Nippert Stadium; Attendance: 25,667 (USL record for home opener); Referee: Joseph Dickerson

April 15, 2018 4	Bethlehem Steel FC	1–1	FC Cincinnati	Bethlehem, Pennsylvania
3:00 EDT	Burke 15' (yellow card) 83'; Chiluya (yellow card) 66'	BTH Report	Albadawi 72'	Stadium: Goodman Stadium; Attendance: 0 Referee: Amber O'Connor; Assistant referees: Gjovalin Bori; Ben Pilgrim; Fourth official: Michael Guzzetta

April 21, 2018 5	FC Cincinnati	2–2	Pittsburgh Riverhounds	Cincinnati, Ohio
7:00 EDT	König 59'; Ledesma (yellow card) 68'; Walker 78'; Keinan (yellow card) 88'; Laing (yellow card) 90+2'	CIN Report; PIT Report; Box Score	Dover 6' (yellow card) 36'; Vancaeyezeele 73'	Stadium: Nippert Stadium; Attendance: 24,505; Referee: Greg Dopka

April 28, 2018 6	Ottawa Fury FC	0–3	FC Cincinnati	Ottawa, Ontario
2:00 EDT	Reid (yellow card) 63'	CIN Report; OTT Report; Box Score	Lasso (yellow card) 50'; Smith (yellow card) 57'; Walker 68'; Bone 69'; Ledesma (yellow card) 56' (goal) 77'	Stadium: TD Place Stadium; Attendance: 2,785

May 2, 2018 7	Indy Eleven	2–3	FC Cincinnati	Indianapolis, Indiana
7:00 EDT	Jack McInerney 24'; Ayoze 30' (pen.) (yellow card) 88'	CIN report IND report Box score	Kenney Walker 7' (pen.) (yellow card) 75'; Jimmy McLaughlin 41'; Corben Bone 54'; Forrest Lasso (yellow card) 60'; Emery Welshman (yellow card) 72'	Stadium: Lucas Oil Stadium; Attendance: 8,079; Referee: Marco de Oliveira; Assistant referees: Joe Zawistowski; Kevin Fikar; Fourth official: Michael Nickerson

May 5, 2018 8	FC Cincinnati	4–2	Atlanta United 2	Cincinnati, Ohio
7:00 EDT	König 26'; Ledesma 28' 48'; Keinan (yellow card) 30'; Bone 39'	CIN Report; ATL Report; Box Score	Gallagher 31'; Kissiedou (yellow card) 37' (goal) 41'; Carleton (yellow card) 87'	Stadium: Nippert Stadium; Attendance: 22,532; Referee: Guido Gonzalez Jr.

May 12, 2018 9	Charlotte Independence	4–1	FC Cincinnati	Matthews, North Carolina
7:30 EDT	Cato 38'; Ekra 45+2'; Voser 57'; Martínez (yellow card) 68'; Zayed 87'	CIN Report; CLT Report; Box Score	Ledesma (yellow card) 45+1'; König 51'; Ryan (yellow card) 71'; Lasso (yellow card) 75'; Keinan (yellow card) 85'	Stadium: Sportsplex at Matthews; Attendance: 2,314; Referee: Kevin Broadley

May 19, 2018 10	FC Cincinnati	4–1	North Carolina FC	Cincinnati, Ohio
7:30 EDT	Smith (yellow card) 29'; Albadawi 11', 45'; Ledesma 62' (pen.); König 69' (yellow card) 75'	CIN Report; NCFC Report	Bekker (yellow card) 65'; Lomis 86'	Stadium: Nippert Stadium; Attendance: 22,884; Referee: Victor Rivas

May 26, 2018 11	FC Cincinnati	0–2	Louisville City FC	Cincinnati, Ohio
7:30 EDT	Barrett (yellow card) 28'; Ryan (yellow card) 33'; Keinan (yellow card) 81'	CIN Report; LOU Report	Lancaster 15'; Craig (yellow card) 55'; Davis IV 73'; Williams (yellow card) 85'	Stadium: Nippert Stadium; Attendance: 26,495

June 2, 2018 12	New York Red Bulls II	1–2	FC Cincinnati	Harrison, New Jersey
1:00 EDT	Moreno 7'; Stauffer (yellow card) 69'	CIN Report; NYRB Report; Box Score	Welshman (yellow card) 52'; Barrett (yellow card) 61'; Ledsema 65'; Ryan (yellow card) 71'; König 77'	Stadium: Red Bull Arena; Attendance: 613; Referee: Ismir Pekmic

June 9, 2018 13	North Carolina FC	0–2	FC Cincinnati	Cary, North Carolina
7:00 EDT		CIN Report; NCFC Report	Ledesma (yellow card) 36'; König 37' (yellow card) 52'; Hoyte (yellow card) 72'; McLaughlin 87'	Stadium: WakeMed Soccer Park; Attendance: 4,039; Referee: Mark Allatin

June 13, 2018 14	FC Cincinnati	2–2	Bethlehem Steel FC	Cincinnati, Ohio
7:30 EDT	Albadawi 66'; Cicerone 68'	CIN Report; BTH Report	Jones 29'; Mbaizo (red card) 52'; Herbers 69' (yellow card) 86'	Stadium: Nippert Stadium; Attendance: 22,407; Referee: Marcos de Oliveira; Assistant referees: Cory Richardson; Benjamin Hall-Volpenhein; Fourth official: Jason Ulrich

June 16, 2018 15	FC Cincinnati	4–0	Richmond Kickers	Cincinnati, Ohio
7:30 EDT	Ledesma 8', 67'; Albadawi 36'; König 60'; Welshman (yellow card) 82'; Keinan (yellow card) 90+1'	CIN Report; RIC Report	Cordovés (yellow card) 33'; Williams (yellow card) 90'	Stadium: Nippert Stadium; Attendance: 28,026; Referee: Elvis Osmanovic; Assistant referees: Jeffrey Swartzel; Adrienne McDonald; Fourth official: Luke Sobota

June 27, 2018 16	Toronto FC II	3–3	FC Cincinnati	Toronto, Ontario
7:00 EDT	Akinola 28'; Bjornethun (yellow card) 45'; Boskovic 70'; Hamilton 75'; Campbell (yellow card) 88'	CIN Report; TOR Report	Albadawi 8'; Welshman 38'; Ledesma 40'	Stadium: Lamport Stadium; Attendance: 288; Referee: Fabrizio Stasolla

June 30, 2018 17	FC Cincinnati	2–0	Ottawa Fury FC	Cincinnati, Ohio
7:30 EDT	König 16'; Smith (yellow card) 86'; Albadawi 90+2'	CIN Report; OTT Report; Box score	Oliveira (yellow card) 71'	Stadium: Nippert Stadium; Attendance: 27,107; Referee: Daniel Gutierrez

July 7, 2018 18	Nashville SC	0–0	FC Cincinnati	Nashville, Tennessee
8:30 EDT	Moloto (yellow card) 15'	CIN Report; NSH Report	Keinan (yellow card) 17'	Stadium: Nissan Stadium; Attendance: 18,228; Referee: Lorant Varga

July 14, 2018 19	FC Cincinnati	2–0	Tampa Bay Rowdies	Cincinnati, Ohio
7:30 EDT	Ledesma 54', (yellow card) 63'; König 84'	CIN Report; TBR Report	Flemmings (yellow card) 23'	Stadium: Nippert Stadium; Attendance: 25,416; Referee: Malik Badawi

July 18, 2018 20	FC Cincinnati	2–0	Charlotte Independence	Cincinnati, Ohio
7:30 EDT	Keinan 7'; Lasso 20'; Ledesma (yellow card) 67'; Welshman (yellow card) 87'	CIN Report; CLT Report	Duckett (yellow card) 28'; Zayed (yellow card) 65'; Voser (yellow card) 87'	Stadium: Nippert Stadium; Attendance: 25,251; Referee: Jon Freemon

July 21, 2018 21	FC Cincinnati	2–1	New York Red Bulls II	Cincinnati, Ohio
7:30 EDT	Lasso 17'; Barrett (yellow card) 22', (goal) 35'; Smith (yellow card) 60'	CIN Report; NYRB Report	Tinari (yellow card) 14'; König 25' (o.g.); Barlow (yellow card) 53'; Stauffer (yellow card) 80'	Stadium: Nippert Stadium; Attendance: 23,602; Referee: Michael Radchuk

August 4, 2018 22	FC Cincinnati	1–1	Nashville SC	Cincinnati, Ohio
7:30 EDT	König 1', (yellow card) 71'; Lasso (yellow card) 30'; Walker (yellow card) 60'	CIN Report; NSH Report	Hume 85'; Mensah (yellow card) 90+1'; Davis (yellow card) 90+3'	Stadium: Nippert Stadium; Attendance: 27,426; Referee: Ismir Pekmic

August 12, 2018 23	FC Cincinnati	1–0	Penn FC	Cincinnati, Ohio
6:00 EDT	Ledesma 80'	CIN Report; PENN Report	Baffoe (yellow card) 43'; Tribbett (yellow card) 79'; Mkosana (yellow card) 83'	Stadium: Nippert Stadium; Attendance: 24,249; Referee: Mark Allatin

August 18, 2018 24	FC Cincinnati	3–0	Charleston Battery	Cincinnati, Ohio
7:30 EDT	Ledesma (yellow card) 13', (goal) 21'; Bone 45+1'; Barrett (yellow card) 53'; Thomas 90+5' (o.g.)	CIN Report	Anunga (yellow card) 30'; Svantesson (yellow card) 87'	Stadium: Nippert Stadium; Attendance: 27,142; Referee: Rosendo Mendoza; Assistant referees: Benjamin Hall-Volpenhein; James Duling; Fourth official: Luke Sobota

August 22, 2018 25	Atlanta United 2	1–5	FC Cincinnati	Lawrenceville, Georgia
7:00 EDT	Bello (yellow card) 16'; Nicklaw 65'; Gallagher (yellow card) 90+1'	CIN Report; ATL Report	Bone 18'; Albadawi 25', 55'; Konate (yellow card) 36'; Alashe (yellow card) 45+1', (goal) 53'; Welshman 87'	Stadium: Coolray Field; Attendance: 1,638; Referee: JJ Bilinsk

August 25, 2018 26	Tampa Bay Rowdies	1–2	FC Cincinnati	St. Petersburg, Florida
7:30 EDT	Taku (yellow card) 1'; Cole (yellow card) 15'; Poku (yellow card) 43', (goal) 75'; Portillos (yellow card) 68'; Oduro (yellow card) 80'; Diakité (yellow card) 82' (yellow-red card) 85'	Report	Ledesma 2' (pen.), 86' (pen.); Smith (yellow card) 50' (yellow-red card) 62'; Barrett (yellow card) 88'; Newton (yellow card) 90+2'	Stadium: Al Lang Stadium; Attendance: 5,963; Referee: Kevin Broadley

September 1, 2018 27	FC Cincinnati	2–1	Pittsburgh Riverhounds	Cincinnati, Ohio
7:30 EDT	Lasso (yellow card) 38'; Keinan 80'; Adi 88', (yellow card) 88'	USL Report; CIN Report	Parkes 57'	Stadium: Nippert Stadium; Attendance: 25,735; Referee: Joseph Dickerson

September 11, 2018 28	Louisville City FC	0–1	FC Cincinnati	Louisville, Kentucky
7:00 EDT	DelPiccolo (yellow card) 90+3'	USL Report; CIN Report	Bone 23'; Richey (yellow card) 90+2'	Stadium: Louisville Slugger Field; Attendance: 10,009; Referee: Joshua Brooks

September 16, 2018 29	FC Cincinnati	4–3	Toronto FC II	Cincinnati, Ohio
4:30 EDT	Lasso 31'; Adi 45+2'; Bone 78', 88'	Report; CIN Report	Endoh 24', 45+4', 73'; Johnson (yellow card) 29'; Hundal (yellow card) 63'	Stadium: Nippert Stadium; Attendance: 27,275; Referee: Lorant Varga

September 22, 2018 30	Penn FC	1–2	FC Cincinnati	Harrisburg, Pennsylvania
7:00 EDT	Calvano (yellow card) 7'; Paulo 33'; Osae (yellow card) 45+1'	CIN Report; PENN Report	König (yellow card) 7'; Ledesma (yellow card) 32', (goal) 68'; Bone 84'	Stadium: FNB Field; Attendance: 3,117; Referee: Thomas Snyder

September 26, 2018 31	Richmond Kickers	1–4	FC Cincinnati	Richmond, Virginia
7:00 EDT	Eaton (yellow card) 14'; Cordovés 32'; Luiz Fernando (yellow card) 50'; Sekyere (yellow card) 72'; Shanosky (yellow card) 85'	CIN Report; RIC Report; Report	Albadawi 16'; Ledesma 40', 44', (yellow card) 45+3'; Alashe (yellow card) 45+5'; Welshman 63'	Stadium: City Stadium; Attendance: 1,519; Referee: Nickrod Fateh

September 29, 2018 32	FC Cincinnati	3–0	Indy Eleven	Cincinnati, Ohio
7:30 EDT	König (yellow card) 31', (goal) 65'; Adi 34'; Mitchell 74' (o.g.)	CIN Report; IND Report; Report	Matern (yellow card) 31'	Stadium: Nippert Stadium; Attendance: 31,478 (USL record); Referee: Timothy Ford

October 6, 2018 33	Pittsburgh Riverhounds	0–0	FC Cincinnati	Pittsburgh, Pennsylvania
7:00 EDT		CIN Report; PIT Report; Report	Lasso (yellow card) 35'	Stadium: Highmark Stadium; Attendance: 3,205; Referee: Eric Tattersall

October 13, 2018 34	Nashville SC	3–3	FC Cincinnati	Nashville, Tennessee
8:30 EDT	Hume 5'; LaGrassa (yellow card) 40'; Allen 80'; Akinyode 90'	CIN Report	Albadawi (yellow card) 39', (goal) 63'; Bone 52', 81'	Stadium: First Tennessee Park; Attendance: 9,083; Referee: Marcos DeOliveira

==== Standings ====
Pos	Team	Pld	W	D	L	GF	GA	GD	Pts	Qualification
1	FC Cincinnati (X)	34	23	8	3	72	34	+38	77	Conference Playoffs
2	Louisville City FC (C)	34	19	9	6	71	38	+33	66	Conference Playoffs
3	Pittsburgh Riverhounds SC	34	15	14	5	47	26	+21	59	Conference Playoffs
4	Charleston Battery	34	14	14	6	47	34	+13	56	Conference Playoffs
5	New York Red Bulls II	34	13	13	8	71	59	+12	52	Conference Playoffs

Source: 2018 USL standings
Rules for classification: 1) total wins; 2) total goal differential; 3) total goals scored; 4) points earned against top four Conference finishers; 5) disciplinary points; 6) coin toss or drawing of lots
(C) Champions; (X) Regular Season League Champion
