= 2017 FC Cincinnati season =

FC Cincinnati
2017 season
- General manager: Jeff Berding
- Head coach: Alan Koch
- Stadium: Nippert Stadium
- USL: Sixth, Eastern Conference
- USL Playoffs: Quarterfinals
- U.S. Open Cup: Semifinals
- Top goalscorer: League: Baye Djiby Fall (11); All: Baye Djiby Fall (15)
- Highest home attendance: League: 30,417 (September 16 vs. NYRB II); All: 33,250 (August 15 vs. New York)
- Lowest home attendance: League: 15,244 (April 19 vs. Tampa Bay); All: 6,519 (May 31 vs. Louisville City)
- Average home league attendance: League: 21,199; All: 21,696
- Biggest win: CIN 4–0 STL (4/15)
- Biggest defeat: LOU 5–0 CIN (8/12)
Home colors	Away colors	Third colors

The 2017 FC Cincinnati season was the club's second season of existence, and their second in the United Soccer League (USL). It was FC Cincinnati's first season as a second-tier team in the U.S. soccer pyramid, as the United States Soccer Federation provisionally promoted the USL from Division III to Division II for the 2017 season. FC Cincinnati plays in the Eastern Division of USL.

The season is best remembered for FC Cincinnati's championship run in the U.S. Open Cup. They won matches against five teams, including Columbus Crew and Chicago Fire of MLS (the highest division of U.S. soccer), to advance to the semifinals, a feat not achieved by a lower-division team since 2009. Their run was also noted for setting many attendance records; their matches against the New York Red Bulls and Chicago Fire were respectively the 2nd and 3rd highest-attended U.S. Open Cup matches ever, beaten only by the 2011 Final. Their match against Chicago Fire aired on ESPN, marking the first time a match from the Round of 16 received a national television broadcast.

== Club ==
=== Coaching staff ===
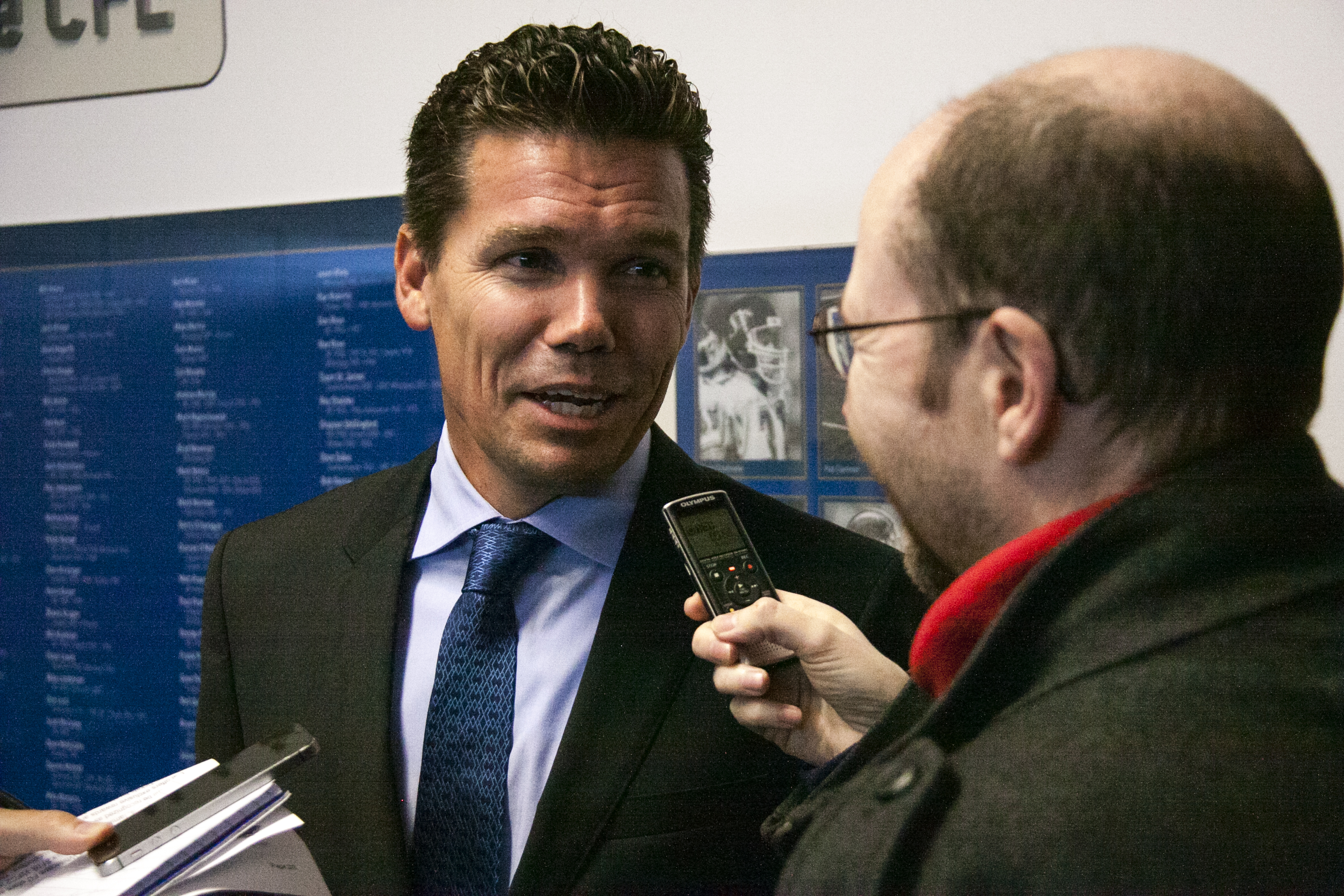
Alan Koch became the club's head coach on February 17.

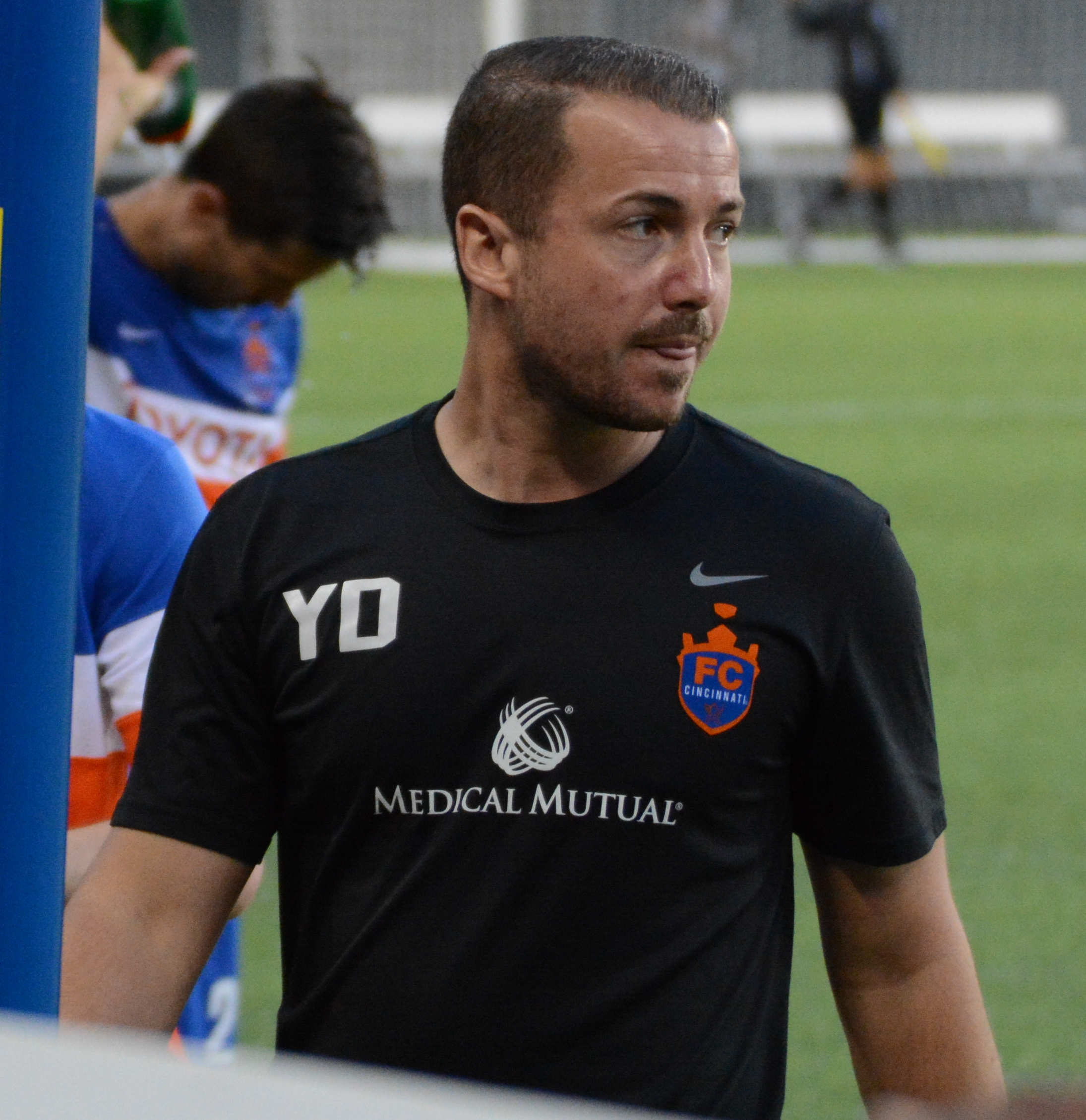
Yoann Damet was hired as assistant coach on March 28.

Position	Staff
Head coach	(South Africa) Alan Koch
Assistant coach	(France) Yoann Damet
Goalkeeper coach	(United States) David Schureck
Scout/Youth Coordinator	
Athletic Trainer	(United States) Aaron Powell
Strength & Conditioning	(United States) Ben Yauss
UC Health	(United States) Dr. Angelo Colosimo (United States) Dr. Brian Grawe

The club announced on October 21, 2016, that assistant coach Ryan Martin would not be returning for the 2017 season. On December 14, 2016, the club announced that Alan Koch, former head coach of the Whitecaps FC 2, would be taking Martin's place as an assistant coach, in addition to acting as the director of scouting and analytics. On February 17, 2017, the club announced that head coach John Harkes was relieved of his coaching duties and replaced with Alan Koch. On March 28, 2017, Yoann Damet was added to the staff as assistant coach.

=== Roster ===
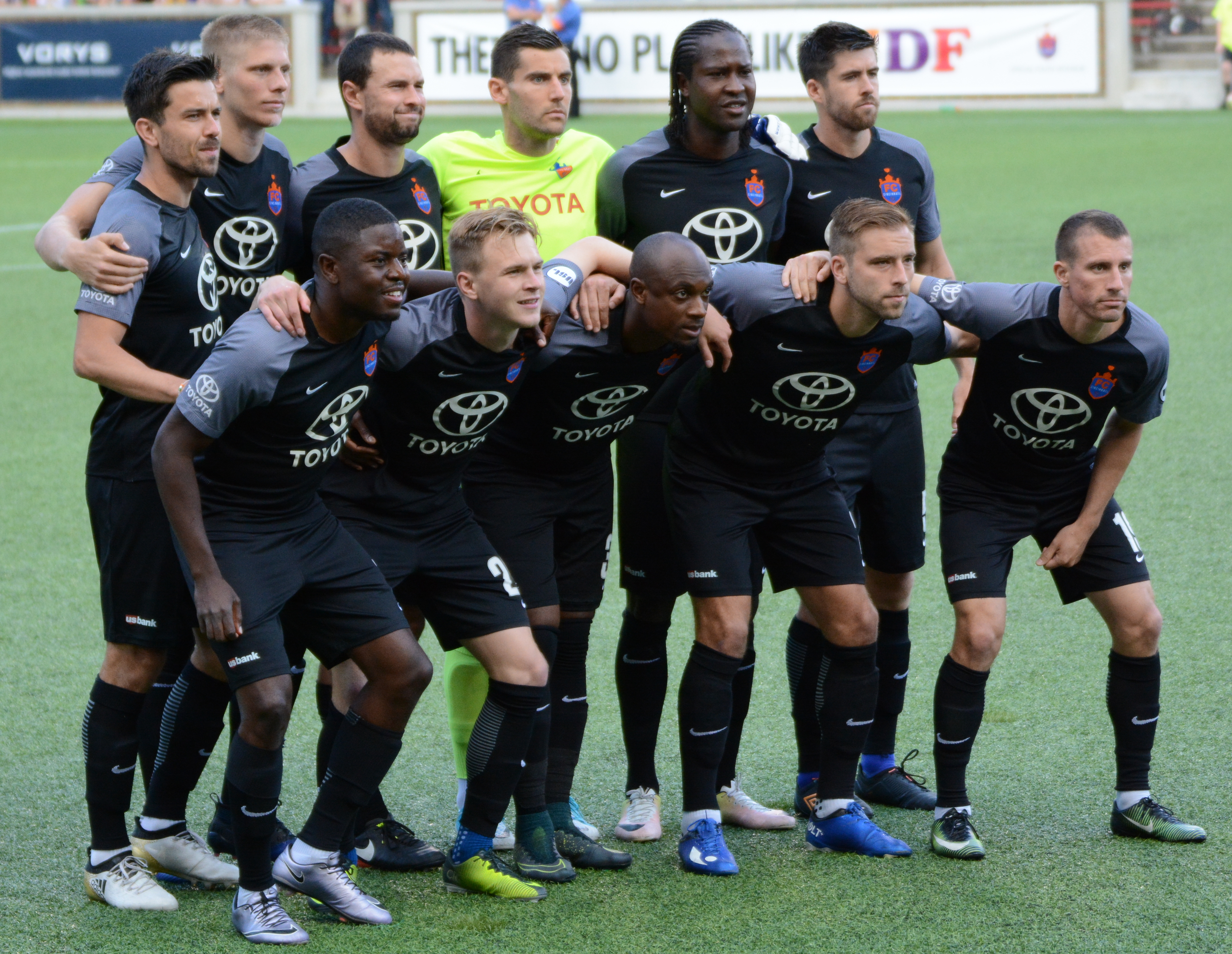
FCC's starting eleven before a match

As of December 15, 2016, FC Cincinnati has confirmed the return of seventeen players from the 2016 roster, as well as the signing of one new player. Fifteen of these players were announced on November 14, and goalkeeper Mitch Hildebrandt was announced three days later. On December 15, the return of Eric Stevenson and the new signing of Kadeem Dacres were announced. The club held a public tryout with over eighty participants on December 18, 2016. On January 6, 2017, the club announced the signings of Andy Craven, Marco Dominguez, and Aaron Walker (who was selected from the public tryout). On February 6, 2017, the club announced they acquired striker, Victor Mansaray, on loan from Seattle Sounders FC. On March 29, 2017, the club signed Justin Hoyte, a former defender for Premier League club Arsenal. On May 10, 2017, the club traded forward Andy Craven to the OKC Energy FC for forward Danni König. On May 15, 2017, the club announced the signing of defender Josu.

Where a player has not declared an international allegiance, nation is determined by place of birth.

No.	Position	Player	Nation
1	GK	USA	Mitch Hildebrandt
2	DF	USA	Matt Bahner
3	DF	USA	Tyler Polak
4	DF	AUS	Harrison Delbridge
5	MF	USA	Aodhan Quinn
6	MF	USA	Kenney Walker
7	FW	USA	Kadeem Dacres
8	MF	ENG	Paul Nicholson
9	FW	SEN	Djiby Fall
11	FW	DEN	Danni König
12	MF	USA	Aaron Walker
15	DF	USA	Pat McMahon
16	FW	USA	Kyle Greig (on loan from Vancouver Whitecaps FC)
19	MF	USA	Corben Bone
20	MF	USA	Jimmy McLaughlin
21	MF	CAN	Marco Dominguez
22	DF	USA	Austin Berry
23	FW	USA	Andrew Wiedeman
26	DF	USA	Garrett Halfhill
27	GK	USA	Dan Williams
30	GK	GUM	Dallas Jaye
32	DF	TTO	Justin Hoyte
51	DF	NED	Sem de Wit
70	FW	GER	Kevin Schindler
74	DF	GER	Mélé Temguia
99	DF	ESP	Josu

== Competitions ==
Win Draw Loss

=== USL ===
==== Results Table ====
Matchday	1	2	3	4	5	6	7	8	9	10	11	12	13	14	15	16	17	18	19	20	21	22	23	24	25	26	27	28	29	30	31	32
Stadium	A	A	A	H	H	H	A	A	H	H	H	A	H	H	H	A	A	H	A	H	H	H	A	A	H	H	A	H	A	A	A	A
Result	L	W	L	W	D	D	L	D	L	W	W	L	D	D	W	D	L	W	W	W	L	D	L	L	W	D	D	W	D	W	L	W

Source: MLS
A = Away; H = Home; W = Win; D = Draw; L = Loss

March 25, 2017 1	Charleston Battery	2–1	FC Cincinnati	Charleston, South Carolina
7:00PM EST	Lasso (yellow card) 8' (goal) 38'; Portillo 71' (pen.)	CIN Report; CHS Report; Box Score	Fall 59'	Stadium: MUSC Health Stadium; Attendance: 2,247; Referee: Geoff Gamble; Assistant referees: Brian Marshall; Jordan Davis; Fourth official: Wayne Pavlischek

April 1, 2017 2	Pittsburgh Riverhounds	0–1	FC Cincinnati	Pittsburgh, Pennsylvania
5:00PM EST	Agbossoumonde (yellow card) 31' (yellow-red card) 42'; Washington (yellow card) 84'	CIN Report; PIT Report; Box Score	Dacres (yellow card) 45+1'; Fall 55'; Mansaray (yellow card) 84'	Stadium: Highmark Stadium; Attendance: 2,586; Referee: Guido Gonzalez Jr. Assistant referees: Cory Richardson; Brandon Smith; Fourth official: Maxwell Hartman

April 9, 2017 3	Bethlehem Steel FC	2–0	FC Cincinnati	Bethlehem, Pennsylvania
4:00PM EST	Burke (yellow card) 28'; McKenzie (yellow card) 33'; Jones (yellow card) 45+1'; Conneh 47', 60'	CIN Report; BTH Report; Box Score	Nicholson (red card) 23'	Stadium: Highmark Stadium; Attendance: 3,005; Referee: Jorge Gonzalez; Assistant referees: Daniel Richman; Kevin Lock; Fourth official: Lorant Varga

April 15, 2017 4	FC Cincinnati	4–0	Saint Louis FC	Cincinnati, Ohio
7:00PM EST	Mansaray (yellow card) 38'; Fall 35', 45+2', 48', 62'	CIN Report; STL Report; Box Score	Guzman (yellow card) 63'	Stadium: Nippert Stadium; Attendance: 23,144; Referee: Brandon Artis; Assistant referees: James Duling; Benjamin Hall-Volpenhein; Fourth official: Eric Tattersall

April 19, 2017 5	FC Cincinnati	1–1	Tampa Bay Rowdies	Cincinnati, Ohio
7:00PM EST	Delbridge 36'; Bahner (yellow card) 58'; Dacres (red card) 75'	CIN Report; TB Report; Box Score	Schäfer 7'; Lowe (yellow card) 20'; Nanchoff (yellow card) 65'; Boden (yellow card) 70'	Stadium: Nippert Stadium; Attendance: 15,244; Referee: Jon Freemon; Assistant referees: Cory Richardson; Noah Matos; Fourth official: William Gaither III

April 22, 2017 6	FC Cincinnati	1–1	Louisville City FC	Cincinnati, Ohio
7:00PM EST	Mansaray (yellow card) 30'; Berry (yellow card) 50'; Walker (yellow card) 69'; Quinn 78'; Fall (red card) 86'	CIN Report; LOU Report; Box Score	Ownby 19'; Totsch (yellow card) 20'; DelPiccolo (yellow card) 83'	Stadium: Nippert Stadium; Attendance: 20,437; Referee: Mark Kadlecik; Assistant referees: Maggie Short; Jeffrey Swartzel; Fourth official: Aaron Mitchell

April 29, 2017 7	Bethlehem Steel FC	1–0	FC Cincinnati	Bethlehem, Pennsylvania
5:00 PM EST	Seku Conneh (yellow card) 42'; Wijnaldum (yellow card) 59'; Moar (yellow card) 80'; Roberts 87'	CIN Report; BST Report; Box Score	Polak (yellow card) 85'; Craven (red card) 90+4'	Stadium: Goodman Stadium; Attendance: 3,086; Referee: Danielle Chesky; Assistant referees: Brian Dunn; Patrick Casey; Fourth official: Matthew Vodzak

May 6, 2017 8	Richmond Kickers	1–1	FC Cincinnati	Richmond, Virginia
7:00 PM EST	Sekyere 7'	CIN Report; Box Score	McLaughlin 70'; Delbridge (yellow card) 86'	Stadium: City Stadium; Attendance: 4,008; Referee: Charles Murphy; Assistant referees: Gregory Brigman; Ryan Graves; Fourth official: James Walker

May 13, 2017 9	FC Cincinnati	0–2	Orlando City B	Cincinnati, Ohio
5:00 PM EST	Bahner (yellow card) 15'; Quinn (yellow card) 35'; König (yellow card) 39'; McLaughlin (yellow card) 58'; Bone (yellow card) 67'	CIN Report; OCB Report; Box Score	Hines (yellow card) 33' da Silva 75' (pen.); Laryea (yellow card) 80' (goal) 90+1'; Donovan (yellow card) 90+3'	Stadium: Nippert Stadium; Attendance: 19,310; Referee: Calin Radosav; Assistant referees: Benjamin Hall-Volpenhein; Matthew Fotia; Fourth official: Benjamin Miller

May 20, 2017 10	FC Cincinnati	2–1	Bethlehem Steel FC	Cincinnati, Ohio
7:00 PM EST	König 18', 52'; Fordyce (yellow card) 43'; Quinn (yellow card) 86'	CIN Report; BST Report; Box Score	Conneh 33' (pen.) (yellow card) 47'; Nanco (yellow card) 45'; Tribbett (yellow card) 64'; Brown (yellow card) 90'	Stadium: Nippert Stadium; Attendance: 18,441; Referee: Malik Badawi; Assistant referees: Walter Heatherly; Nait Hegerty; Fourth official: Kevin Fikar

May 27, 2017 11	FC Cincinnati	1–0	Toronto FC II	Cincinnati, Ohio
5:00 PM EST	König 18'; Delbridge (yellow card) 27'; Quinn (yellow card) 35'	CIN Report; TOR Report; Box Score	Alseth (yellow card) 84'	Stadium: Nippert Stadium; Attendance: 18,214; Referee: Guido Gonzales Jr. Assistant referees: Maggie Short; Jeffrey Swartzel; Fourth official: Matthew Fotia

June 3, 2017 12	Rochester Rhinos	1–0	FC Cincinnati	Rochester, New York
6:00 PM EST	Kamdem 65'	CIN Report; ROC Report; Box Score	Walker (yellow card) 63'; Halfhill (yellow card) 90'	Stadium: Rochester Rhinos Stadium; Attendance: 2,158; Referee: Jorge Ramirez; Assistant referees: Gabriel Angelone; Ankur Singh; Fourth official: Anthony Perdue

June 10, 2017 13	FC Cincinnati	1–1	Charlotte Independence	Cincinnati, Ohio
7:00 PM EST	K. Walker (yellow card) 43'; Hoyte 45'	CIN Report; Box Score	E. Martínez (yellow card) 17' (yellow-red card) 90'; A. Martínez 18'; Waechter (yellow card) 56'	Stadium: Nippert Stadium; Attendance: 21,115; Referee: Bardhyl Pashaj; Assistant referees: Art Arustamyan; Kyle Maust; Fourth official: Noah Matos

June 17, 2017 14	FC Cincinnati	2–2	Charleston Battery	Cincinnati, Ohio
7:00 PM EST	Djiby 4'; König (yellow card) 45+1'; Wiedeman 80'	CIN Report; CHS Report; Box Score	Romario Williams (yellow card) 49' (goal) 58'; Lasso 72'	Stadium: Nippert Stadium; Attendance: 21,074; Referee: Eric Tattersall; Assistant referees: Maggie Short; Matthew Rodman; Fourth official: Kevin Fikar

June 24, 2017 15	FC Cincinnati	2–0	Saint Louis FC	Cincinnati, Ohio
7:00 PM EST	Cochran 7' (o.g.); Djiby (yellow card) 52'; König 66'	CIN Report; STL Report; Box Score	Guzmán (yellow card) 28'; Cabalceta (yellow card) 50'; Cochran (yellow card) 72'; Charpie (yellow card) 86'	Stadium: Nippert Stadium; Attendance: 20,125; Referee: Victor Rivas

July 1, 2017 16	Orlando City B	1–1	FC Cincinnati	Orlando, Florida
8:30 PM EST	Schweitzer 2'; Hines (yellow card) 45+1'; Clowes (yellow card) 46' da Silva (red card) 87'	CIN Report; OCB Report; Box Score	Djiby 16'; Berry (yellow card) 75'	Stadium: Orlando City Stadium; Attendance: 980; Referee: Lorant Varga

July 6, 2017 17	Tampa Bay Rowdies	2–0	FC Cincinnati	St. Petersburg, Florida
8:00 PM EST	Paterson 39'; Cole 44'; Savage (yellow card) 68'; Mkandawire (yellow card) 90+1'	CIN Report; TBR Report; Box Score	Quinn (yellow card) 7'; Dacres (yellow card) 45+2'; McLaughlin (yellow card) 74'	Stadium: Al Lang Stadium; Attendance: 6,269; Referee: Jonathan Weiner

July 9, 2017 18	FC Cincinnati	2–0	Richmond Kickers	Cincinnati, Ohio
6:00 PM EST	Djiby 3'; Nicholson (yellow card) 72'; Bahner (yellow card) 78'; Quinn 90+1' (pen.)	CIN Report; RIC Report; Box Score	Sekyere (red card) 87'	Stadium: Nippert Stadium; Attendance: 21,769; Referee: Joe Freemon; Assistant referees: Benjamin Hall-Volpenhein; James Duling; Fourth official: Aaron Mitchell

July 15, 2017 19	Louisville City FC	2–3	FC Cincinnati	Louisville, Kentucky
7:30 PM EST	Ilić 8' (pen.); Smith (yellow card) 27'; Davis (yellow card) 36'; DelPiccolo (yellow card) 78'; Wiedeman 90+3' (o.g.)	CIN Report; LOU Report; Box Score	Djiby 16'; Bone (yellow card) 52'; Delbridge 55'; König 77'	Stadium: Louisville Slugger Field; Attendance: 11,632; Referee: Marcos de Oliveira

July 22, 2017 20	FC Cincinnati	3–0	Harrisburg City Islanders	Cincinnati, Ohio
7:00 PM EST	Djiby 32'; König 70'; McLaughlin 85'	CIN Report; HAR Report; Box Score	Thomas (yellow card) 62'; DiPrima (yellow card) 85'	Stadium: Nippert Stadium; Attendance: 18,334; Referee: Jorge Ramirez
Note: Originally scheduled for July 26, 2017

July 29, 2017 21	FC Cincinnati	2–3	Rochester Rhinos	Cincinnati, Ohio
7:00 PM EST	McLaughlin 29'; Djiby (red card) 42'; Josu (yellow card) 44'; Berry (yellow card) 81'; Jaye (red card) 84'; König 86' (pen.); Greig (yellow card) 87'; Walker (yellow card) 90+2'	CIN Report; ROC Report; Box Score	Graf 12'; Kamdem (yellow card) 54'; Fall (pen.) (yellow card) 78', (goal) 82' (pen.)	Stadium: Nippert Stadium; Attendance: 23,548; Referee: Guido Gonzalez Jr.

August 5, 2017 22	FC Cincinnati	2–2	Orlando City B	Cincinnati, Ohio
7:00 PM EST	Greig 6'; Quinn (yellow card) 42'; König (yellow card) 90+2'	CIN Report; OCB Report; Box Score	Ellis-Hayden (yellow card) 8'; Martz 14'; Hines (yellow card) 45+1'; Barry 55'	Stadium: Nippert Stadium; Attendance: 25,308; Referee: Bardhyl Pashaj

August 12, 2017 23	Louisville City FC	5–0	FC Cincinnati	Louisville, Kentucky
7:30 PM EST	McCabe 16'; Spencer 45+2'; Kaye 57'; Ballard 72'; Reynolds 83'	CIN Report; LOU Report; Box Score	Schindler (yellow card) 13' de Wit (red card) 36'; Walker (yellow card) 76'	Stadium: Louisville Slugger Field; Attendance: 13,812; Referee: Charles Murphy; Assistant referees: Walter Heatherly; Maggie Short; Fourth official: Kevin Fikar

August 19, 2017 24	New York Red Bulls II	4–0	FC Cincinnati	Montclair, New Jersey
4:00 PM EST	Bonomo 23' (pen.); Tinari (yellow card) 41'; Ndam 42' (red card) 65'; Flemmings 73', 74'; Scarlett (yellow card) 86'	CIN Report; NYRB Report; USL Report	Berry (yellow card) 60'; Josu (red card) 89'; Nicholson (yellow card) 90+2'	Stadium: MSU Soccer Park at Pittser Field; Attendance: 730; Referee: Kevin Broadley

August 23, 2017 25	FC Cincinnati	3–1	Ottawa Fury FC	Cincinnati, Ohio
7:30 PM EST	König 34'; McLaughlin 42'; Polak (yellow card) 52' de Wit 57'	CIN Report; OTT Report	Manesio (yellow card) 24'; Dos Santos (yellow card) 48' (goal) 63'; Barden (yellow card) 50'	Stadium: Nippert Stadium; Attendance: 20,058

September 2, 2017 26	FC Cincinnati	1–1	Pittsburgh Riverhounds	Cincinnati, Ohio
4:00 PM EST	Hildebrandt (yellow card) 34'; Wiedeman 40'; Walker (yellow card) 50'; Delbridge (yellow card) 82'	CIN Report; PIT Report; Box Score	Hertzog 3'; Jack (yellow card) 90+2'	Stadium: Nippert Stadium; Attendance: 22,643; Referee: Joseph Dickerson

September 12, 2017 27	Harrisburg City Islanders	1–1	FC Cincinnati	Harrisburg, Pennsylvania
6:30 PM EST	Brent (yellow card) 18'; McLaws (yellow card) 48'; Mendoza 51'; Miller (yellow card) 89'; Mensah (yellow card) 90+5'	CIN Report; HAR Report; Box Score	Dacres (yellow card) 56'; McLaughlin 90+6'	Stadium: FNB Field; Attendance: 1,820; Referee: Jaroslaw Werel

September 16, 2017 28	FC Cincinnati	4–2	New York Red Bulls II	Cincinnati, Ohio
7:00 PM EST	Berry 5' (yellow card) 9'; Fall (yellow card) 14'; Wiedeman (yellow card) 23'; Bahner (yellow card) 26'; Bone 32' (yellow card) 76'; Delbridge 67' (yellow card) 73'; Walker 72'	CIN Report; NYRB Report; Box Score	Valot 18' 80'; Baah (yellow card) 88'	Stadium: Nippert Stadium; Attendance: 30,417; Referee: Rosendo Mendoza

September 23, 2017 29	Saint Louis FC	2–2	FC Cincinnati	Fenton, Missouri
8:30 PM EST	Rudolph 42'; Volesky 59' (pen.); Stojkov (yellow card) 87'; Radosavljevic (red card) 90+5'	CIN Report; STL Report; Box Score	Greig (yellow card) 41'; Bone 70'; König 90+5' (pen.)	Stadium: World Wide Technology Soccer Park; Attendance: 4,376; Referee: Ismir Pekmic

September 29, 2017 30	Charlotte Independence	0–1	FC Cincinnati	Charlotte, North Carolina
7:00 PM EST	Martínez (yellow card) 38'	CIN Report; CHA Report; Box Score	Schindler 75'; Walker (red card) 89'	Stadium: Ramblewood Soccer Complex; Attendance: 1,577; Referee: Bardhyl Pashaj

October 8, 2017 31	Ottawa Fury FC	4–0	FC Cincinnati	Ottawa, Ontario
2:00 PM EST	Obasi 4' (yellow card) 90+1'; Haworth 13', 20'; Reid (yellow card) 24'; Dos Santos 47'; Venter (red card) 69'; Campbell (yellow card) 89'	CIN Report; OTT Report; Box Score	Fall (yellow card) 39'; Greig (yellow card) 70'	Stadium: TD Place Stadium; Attendance: 5,445; Referee: Yusri Rudolf

October 14, 2017 32	Toronto FC II	3–4	FC Cincinnati	Vaughan, Ontario
7:30 PM EST	Endoh 10', 31'; Spencer (yellow card) 27'; Hundal 53'; Onkony (yellow card) 90+2'; Taintor (yellow card) 90+4'	CIN Report; TOR Report	Delbridge (yellow card) 29'; König 41'; Walker 49'; Fall 66'; Hoyte 86'	Stadium: Ontario Soccer Centre; Attendance: 1,119

==== Standings ====
Pos	Team	Pld	W	D	L	GF	GA	GD	Pts	Qualification
1	Louisville City FC (C)	32	18	8	6	58	31	+27	62	Conference Playoffs
2	Charleston Battery	32	15	9	8	53	33	+20	54	Conference Playoffs
3	Tampa Bay Rowdies	32	14	11	7	50	35	+15	53	Conference Playoffs
4	Rochester Rhinos	32	14	11	7	36	28	+8	53	Conference Playoffs
5	Charlotte Independence	32	13	9	10	52	40	+12	48	Conference Playoffs
6	FC Cincinnati	32	12	10	10	46	48	−2	46	Conference Playoffs
7	New York Red Bulls II	32	13	5	14	57	60	−3	44	Conference Playoffs
8	Bethlehem Steel FC	32	12	8	12	46	45	+1	44	Conference Playoffs
9	Orlando City B	32	10	12	10	37	36	+1	42	
10	Ottawa Fury	32	8	14	10	42	41	+1	38	
11	Harrisburg City Islanders	32	10	7	15	28	47	−19	37	
12	Saint Louis FC	32	9	9	14	35	48	−13	36	
13	Pittsburgh Riverhounds	32	8	12	12	33	42	−9	36	
14	Richmond Kickers	32	8	8	16	24	36	−12	32	
15	Toronto FC II	32	6	7	19	27	54	−27	25	

Source: 2017 USL standings
Rules for classification: 1) total wins; 2) total goal differential; 3) total goals scored; 4) points earned against top four Conference finishers; 5) disciplinary points; 6) coin toss or drawing of lots
(C) Champions

== Statistics ==
=== Appearances ===
No.	Pos.	Name	USL	USL Playoffs	U.S. Open Cup	Total
1	GK	(United States) Mitch Hildebrandt	20	-	3	23
2	DF	(United States) Matt Bahner	19	-	3	22
3	DF	(United States) Tyler Polak	16	-	2	18
4	DF	(Australia) Harrison Delbridge	18	-	4	22
5	MF	(United States) Aodhan Quinn	14	-	3	17
6	MF	(United States) Kenney Walker	17	-	2	19
7	FW	(United States) Kadeem Dacres	16	-	3	19
8	MF	(England) Paul Nicholson	9	-	2	11
9	FW	(Senegal) Baye Djiby Fall	15	-	3	18
10	MF	(United States) Eric Stevenson	1	-	3	4
11	MF	(Denmark) Danni König	13	-	3	16
13	FW	(Panama) Cristian Martínez	1	-	-	1
14	MF	(Jamaica) Omar Cummings	3	-	-	3
15	DF	(United States) Pat McMahon	2	-	1	3
16	MF	(Northern Ireland) Daryl Fordyce	9	-	-	9
16	FW	(United States) Kyle Greig	7	-	-	7
19	DF	(United States) Corben Bone	18	-	3	21
20	MF	(United States) Jimmy McLaughlin	20	-	3	23
21	MF	(Canada) Marco Dominguez	3	-	3	6
22	DF	(United States) Austin Berry	19	-	3	22
23	FW	(United States) Andrew Wiedeman	20	-	4	24
24	DF	(United States) Derek Luke	-	-	1	1
26	DF	(United States) Garrett Halfhill	2	-	1	3
30	GK	(Guam) Dallas Jaye	1	-	1	2
32	DF	(Trinidad and Tobago) Justin Hoyte	11	-	3	14
70	DF	(Germany) Mélé Temguia	1	-	-	1
74	FW	(Germany) Kevin Schindler	1	-	-	1
80	FW	(United States) Victor Mansaray	10	-	1	11
99	FW	(United States) Andy Craven	3	-	-	3
99	DF	(Spain) Josu	7	-	1	8

- Updated to matches played on August 1, 2017.

=== Goals ===
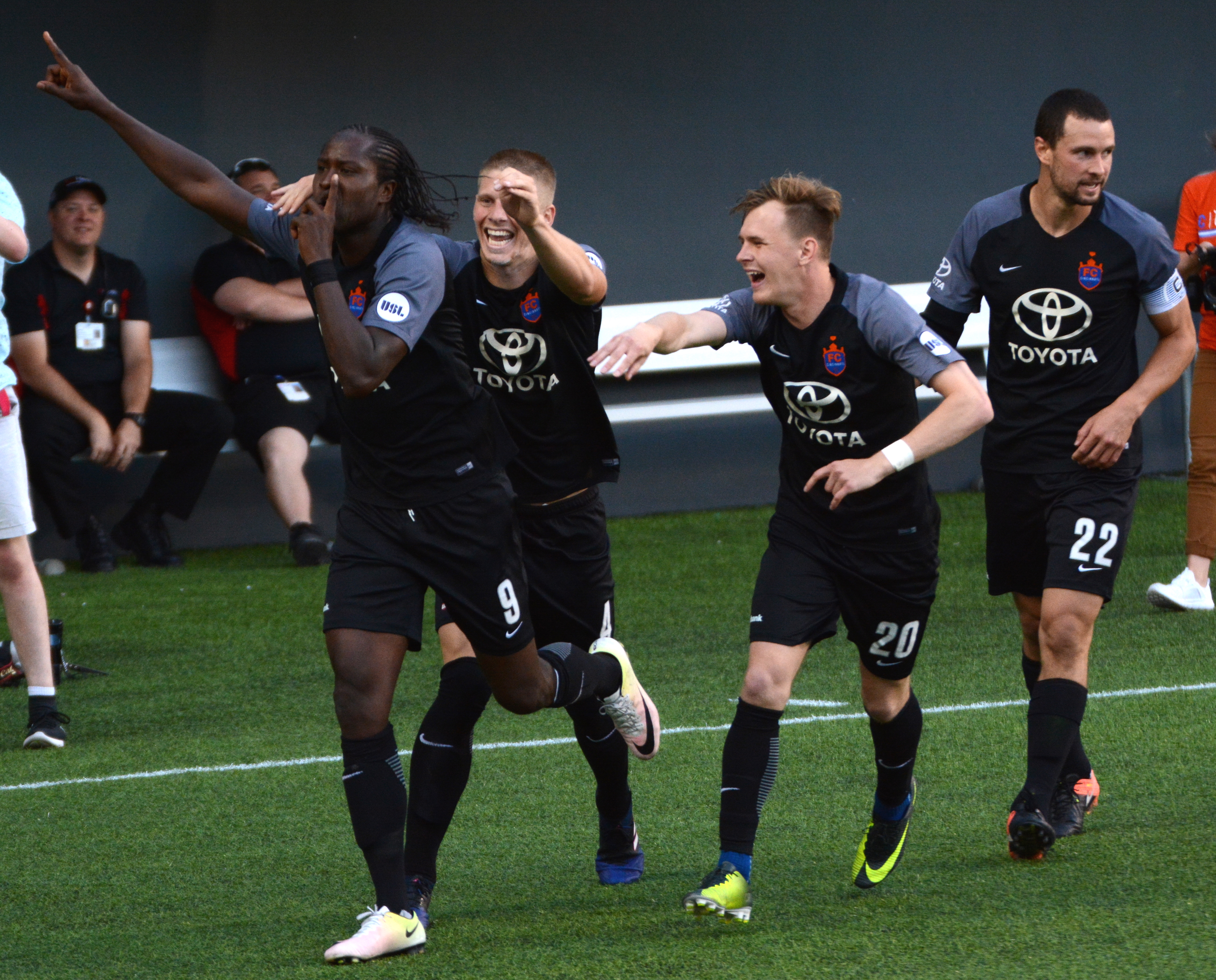
Baye Djiby Fall (left) led FC Cincinnati in goal scoring in 2017.

No.	Pos.	Name	USL	USL Playoffs	U.S. Open Cup	Total
4	DF	(Australia) Harrison Delbridge	2	-	-	2
5	MF	(United States) Aodhan Quinn	2	-	-	2
9	FW	(Senegal) Baye Djiby Fall	11	-	4	15
11	MF	(Denmark) Danni König	8	-	-	8
16	FW	(United States) Kyle Greig	1	-	-	1
19	DF	(United States) Corben Bone	-	-	1	1
20	MF	(United States) Jimmy McLaughlin	3	-	-	3
22	DF	(United States) Austin Berry	-	-	1	1
23	FW	(United States) Andrew Wiedeman	1	-	-	1
32	DF	(Trinidad and Tobago) Justin Hoyte	1	-	-	1

- Updated to matches played on August 17, 2017.
