= Halfhill =

Halfhill is a surname. Notable people with the surname include:

- Garrett Halfhill (born 1993), American soccer player
