= Justin Hoyte =

Trinidad and Tobago footballer (born 1984)

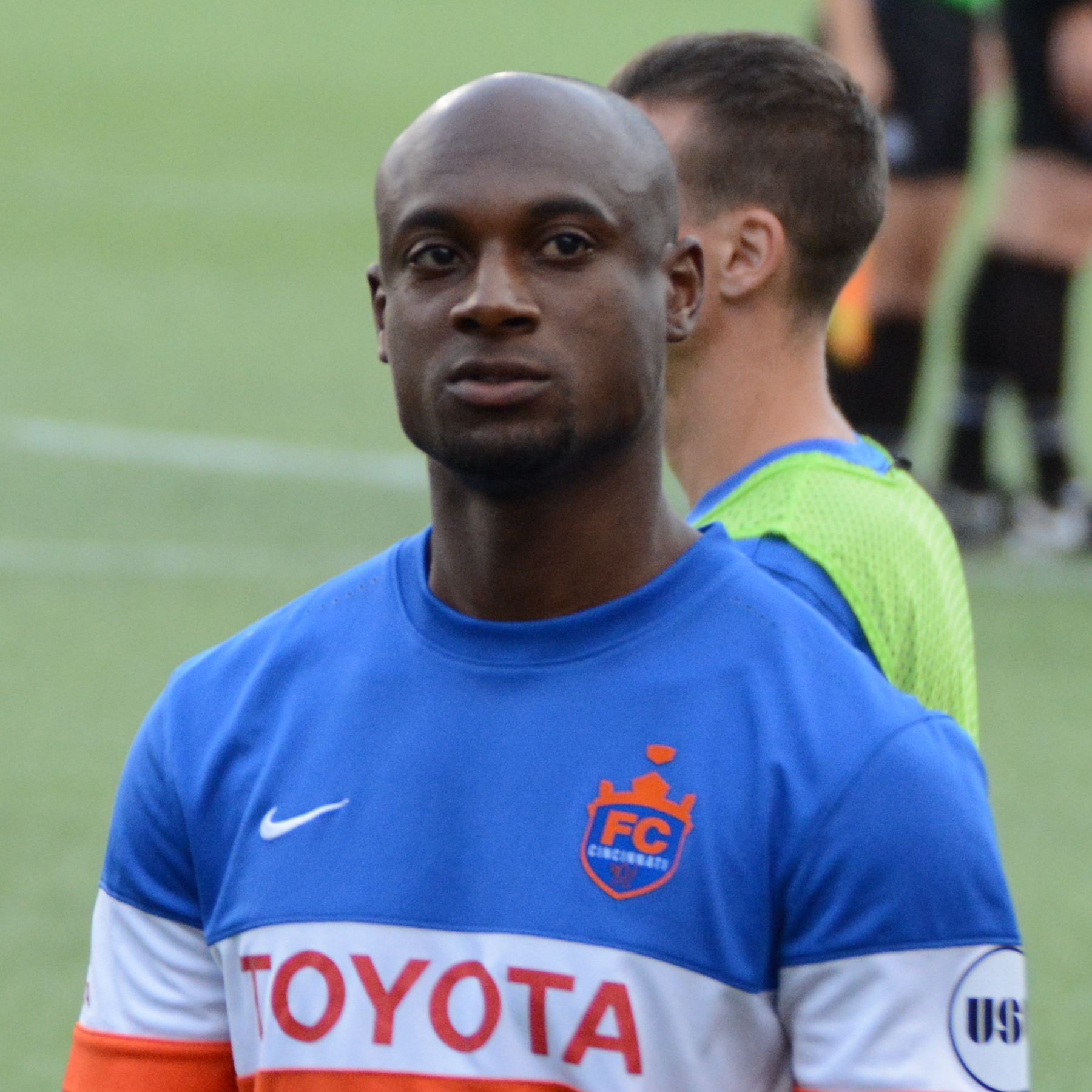
- Hoyte with FC Cincinnati in 2017

Personal information
- Full name: Justin Raymond Hoyte
- Date of birth: 20 November 1984 (age 41)
- Place of birth: Leytonstone, Greater London, England
- Height: 1.78 m (5 ft 10 in)
- Position: Right-back

Youth career
- 1993–2002: Arsenal

Senior career*
Years	Team	Apps	(Gls)
2002–2008	Arsenal	34	(1)
2005–2006	→ Sunderland (loan)	27	(1)
2008–2014	Middlesbrough	142	(2)
2013–2014	→ Millwall (loan)	5	(0)
2014–2015	Millwall	2	(0)
2015–2016	Dagenham & Redbridge	25	(0)
2017–2019	FC Cincinnati	64	(2)
Total		299	(6)

International career
2001–2002	England U16	16	(0)
2001–2003	England U19	20	(0)
2002–2003	England U20	4	(0)
2004–2007	England U21	18	(1)
2013–2016	Trinidad and Tobago	18	(0)
- * Club domestic league appearances and goals

Justin Raymond Hoyte (born 20 November 1984) is a former professional footballer. Primarily a right-back, Hoyte previously played for English clubs Arsenal, Sunderland, Middlesbrough, Millwall and Dagenham & Redbridge, as well as American side FC Cincinnati in both the USL and MLS. As an international, he represented England up to under-21 level and Trinidad and Tobago at senior level.

== Club career ==
=== Arsenal ===
Hoyte was born in Leytonstone, Greater London, and joined Arsenal at the age of nine. He progressed through the club's academy, and was an unused substitute in both legs of the final as Arsenal won the 2001 FA Youth Cup. He signed professional terms with Arsenal in July 2002.

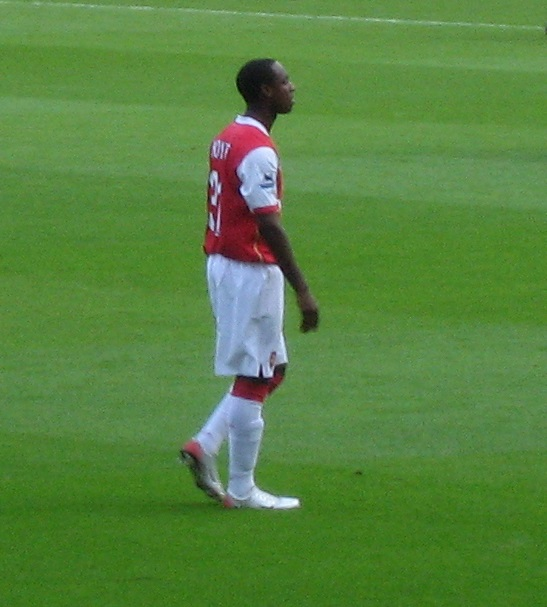
Hoyte playing for Arsenal in 2006

Hoyte made his senior debut as an 89th-minute substitute in Arsenal's 6–1 Premiership victory over Southampton in May 2003. He made one equally late league appearance in their 2003–04 FA Premier League-winning season, which was not enough to qualify him for a medal. Hoyte played in the 2004 FA Community Shield, again from the bench, as Arsenal beat Manchester United, and made his first senior start on 28 August 2004, away to Norwich City, as a last-minute replacement for centre-back Pascal Cygan who was injured in the warm-up. Although he conceded a penalty in Arsenal's 4–1 win, the Independent reported that he "[might] have played well enough to forestall a proposed loan to Ipswich". The loan to the Championship club fell through after Arsenal failed to sign backup for Lauren at right back, so Hoyte remained at Arsenal and finished the season with 12 appearances in all competitions.

During the summer of 2005, Hoyte was linked with a loan move to Ipswich Town, but Arsenal manager Arsène Wenger made clear he wanted the defender to play Premiership football. He was loaned to Sunderland on 31 August for the 2005–06 Premier League season; as part of the deal, Sunderland goalkeeper Mart Poom joined Arsenal as cover for Jens Lehmann. Hoyte made 31 appearances in all competitions for the club and scored once, in the Tyne-Wear derby against Newcastle United in April 2006.

With Gaël Clichy injured and Ashley Cole absent from the team due to his protracted transfer to Chelsea, Hoyte began the 2006–07 season as Arsenal's temporary left back, starting against both Dinamo Zagreb and Aston Villa, although this was expected to be a temporary measure. When Clichy recovered, Hoyte moved back to his preferred right side of defence to cover for the injured Emmanuel Eboué. Hoyte scored his first goal for Arsenal on 2 January 2007 in a 4–0 defeat of Charlton Athletic, which made him the first Englishman to score for the club in their new Emirates Stadium. He finished the season with 36 appearances, a total that included a starting place in the League Cup final, which Arsenal lost 2–1 to Chelsea.

In July 2007, the Daily Mirror reported that Aston Villa were set to make a £4.5 million offer to Arsenal for Hoyte, after manager Martin O'Neill prioritised bringing in someone to fill the right back position. Wenger stated that Hoyte was not going anywhere, and with Éboué playing in midfield, he was in competition with Bacary Sagna for the right back position. That season, Hoyte took his appearance total to 68 in all competitions, but made only two Premier League starts. Determined to stay and fight for his place, the player turned down a move to Aston Villa, but Arsenal were prepared to listen to offers. After Villa signed Middlesbrough's Luke Young, Hoyte agreed to fill the vacancy at right back. Arsenal accepted a £3 million fee, the player signed a four-year contract, and the move was completed on 16 August 2008.

=== Middlesbrough ===
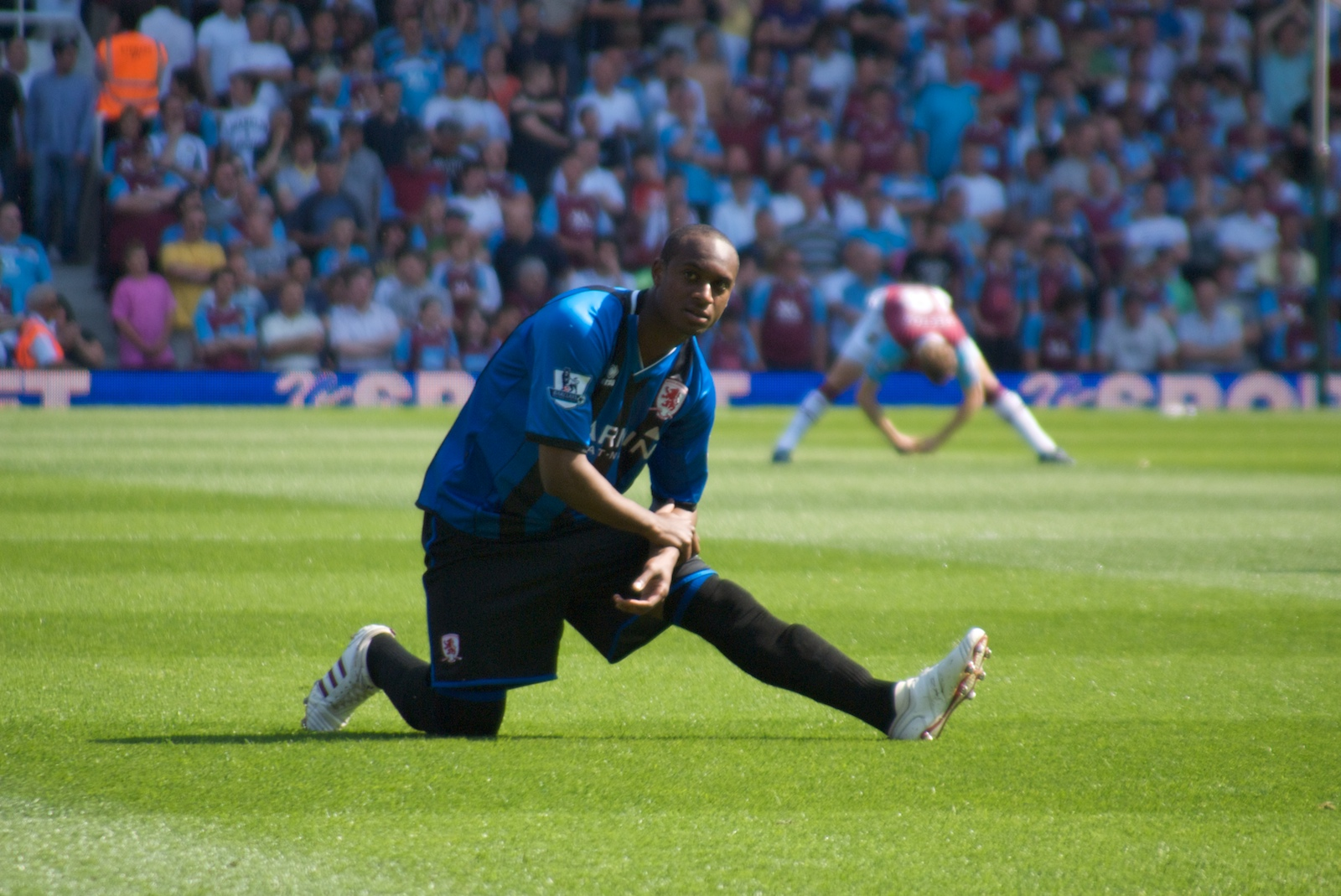
Hoyte playing for Middlesbrough in 2009

On 28 December 2009, Hoyte scored his first goal for Middlesbrough with a cross-shot against Barnsley. Under Tony Mowbray, Hoyte became a regular for the team.

On 8 February 2012, Hoyte was assaulted by a pitch invader during a live televised FA Cup tie between Middlesbrough and Sunderland. His attacker slid into him from behind, injuring Hoyte who was visibly seen limping during extra time. Middlesbrough then lost.

Hoyte left Middlesbrough on a free transfer in July 2012, but agreed to sign a new two-year contract later to become Mowbray's eighth summer signing for the 2012–13 Championship campaign.

On 9 November 2012, Hoyte scored his second league goal for Middlesbrough, with an outside-foot screamer from just inside the area in a 3–1 victory over Sheffield Wednesday putting Middlesbrough top of the table.

In August 2013, after Middlesbrough had signed Frazer Richardson, Mowbray said he would listen to offers for Hoyte. He had scored twice in 162 appearances for the club.

=== Later career ===
On 5 November 2013, Hoyte returned to London to join Championship club Millwall on loan. The move was made permanent on 2 January 2014. He was released at the end of the 2014–15 season, having made only three appearances for the club during his 18-month permanent spell.

Hoyte joined Dagenham and Redbridge of League Two on 30 September 2016 on non-contract terms. He remained with the club to the end of the season, and was one of at least eleven players released after Dagenham's relegation to the National League.

In March 2017, Hoyte signed for FC Cincinnati of the United Soccer League. Cincinnati declined his contract option at the end of the 2019 season.

== International career ==
Hoyte was eligible to play for England as well as for Trinidad and Tobago. In February 2006 he rejected a call-up from Trinidad and Tobago as he wanted to play for England. Trinidad had wanted to call the player into their squad for the 2006 FIFA World Cup. Hoyte said: "It's flattering, of course, and the chance of playing in a World Cup would be great. But for the moment I plan to concentrate purely on my England career and I'm hoping that one day I'll be playing for England in a World Cup."

Hoyte was capped 18 times for the England under-21 team, and played all four matches at the 2007 UEFA Under-21 Championship. He took part in the epic semi-final shootout against hosts Netherlands, missing his first but scoring his second penalty as England lost 13–12. His sole goal for the team also came against the Netherlands, in November 2006.

In February 2013, Hoyte made himself available for selection for the Trinidad and Tobago national team, and he received his first call-up in March.

== Personal life ==
Hoyte is the son of former British sprinters Les Hoyte (who was born in Trinidad and Tobago) and Wendy Hoyte, who won gold at the 1982 Commonwealth Games. His younger brother, Gavin, also played international football for Trinidad and Tobago. He is a cousin of British sprinter Chris Clarke. His uncle is Trevor Hoyte.

== Career statistics ==
=== Club ===
Appearances and goals by club, season and competition
Club	Season	League			National cup		League Cup		Other		Total	
Club	Season	Division	Apps	Goals	Apps	Goals	Apps	Goals	Apps	Goals	Apps	Goals
Arsenal	2002–03	Premier League	1	0	0	0	0	0	0	0	1	0
Arsenal	2003–04	Premier League	1	0	0	0	2	0	0	0	3	0
Arsenal	2004–05	Premier League	5	0	1	0	3	0	3 (Note: Two appearances in UEFA Champions League, one in FA Community Shield)	0	12	0
Arsenal	2005–06	Premier League	0	0	—		—		1 (Note: Appearance in FA Community Shield)	0	1	0
Arsenal	2006–07	Premier League	22	1	4	0	4	0	6 (Note: Appearance(s) in UEFA Champions League)	0	36	1
Arsenal	2007–08	Premier League	5	0	3	0	5	0	2	0	15	0
Arsenal	Total		34	1	8	0	14	0	12	0	68	1
Sunderland (loan)	2005–06	Premier League	27	1	2	0	1	0	—		30	1
Middlesbrough	2008–09	Premier League	22	0	4	0	2	0	—		28	0
Middlesbrough	2009–10	Championship	30	1	1	0	1	0	—		32	1
Middlesbrough	2010–11	Championship	17	0	1	0	2	0	—		20	0
Middlesbrough	2011–12	Championship	39	0	3	0	2	0	—		44	0
Middlesbrough	2012–13	Championship	31	1	0	0	3	0	—		34	1
Middlesbrough	2013–14	Championship	3	0	—		1	0	—		4	0
Middlesbrough	Total		142	2	9	0	11	0	0	0	162	2
Millwall	2013–14	Championship	5	0	—		—		—		5	0
Millwall	2014–15	Championship	2	0	0	0	1	0	—		3	0
Millwall	Total		7	0	0	0	1	0	0	0	8	0
Dagenham & Redbridge	2015–16	League Two	25	0	2	0	—		1 (Note: Appearance in Football League Trophy)	0	28	0
FC Cincinnati	2017	United Soccer League	19	2	5	0	—		1 (Note: Appearances in USL Playoffs)	0	25	2
FC Cincinnati	2018	United Soccer League	28	0	0	0	—		2	0	30	0
FC Cincinnati	2019	Major League Soccer	17	0	1	0	—		0	0	18	0
FC Cincinnati	Total		64	2	6	0	0	0	3	0	73	2
Career total			299	6	27	0	27	0	16	0	369	6

=== International ===
Appearances and goals by national team and year
National team	Year	Apps	Goals
Trinidad and Tobago	2013	8	0
Trinidad and Tobago	2014	6	0
Trinidad and Tobago	2015	2	0
Trinidad and Tobago	2016	2	0
Total		18	0

== Honours ==
Arsenal Youth

- FA Youth Cup: 2000–01

Arsenal

- FA Community Shield: 2004
- Football League Cup runner-up: 2006–07

FC Cincinnati

- USL Regular Season: 2018

Trinidad and Tobago

- Caribbean Cup: runner-up 2014
