= Kevin Schindler =

German former professional footballer (born 1988)

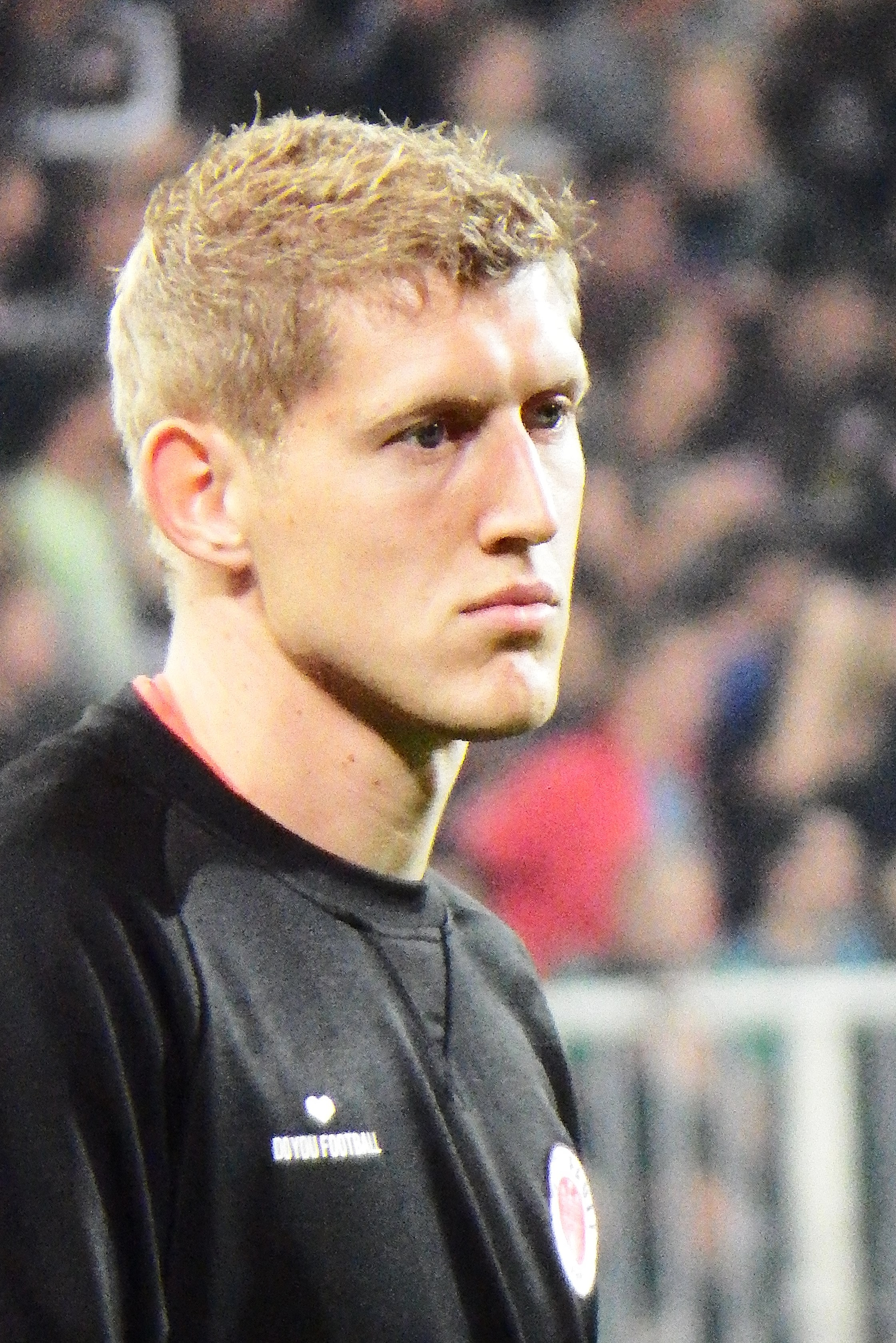
- Schindler with FC St. Pauli in 2013

Personal information
- Date of birth: 21 May 1988 (age 38)
- Place of birth: Delmenhorst, West Germany
- Height: 1.91 m (6 ft 3 in)
- Position: Right winger

Team information
- Current team: Werder Bremen II (assistant manager)

Youth career
- 1993–1999: DTB Delmenhorst
- 1999–2007: Werder Bremen

Senior career*
Years	Team	Apps	(Gls)
2006–2008	Werder Bremen II	48	(11)
2007–2011	Werder Bremen	5	(0)
2008–2009	→ Hansa Rostock (loan)	32	(5)
2009	→ FC Augsburg (loan)	5	(0)
2010	→ MSV Duisburg (loan)	3	(0)
2011–2014	FC St. Pauli	48	(3)
2014–2017	Wehen Wiesbaden	59	(8)
2017	FC Cincinnati	6	(1)
2018–2019	Cambuur	15	(1)
2020	Havnar Bóltfelag	3	(0)
Total		224	(29)

International career
2006–2007	Germany U19	4	(1)
2007–2009	Germany U20	2	(0)
2007–2010	Germany U21	7	(1)

Managerial career
- 2020–2021: Havnar Bóltfelag (assistant)
- 2021: Havnar Bóltfelag
- 2022–2023: Werder Bremen youth (assistant manager)
- 2023–: Werder Bremen II (assistant manager)
- * Club domestic league appearances and goals

Kevin Schindler (born 21 May 1988) is a German former professional footballer who played as a right winger. He works as assistant manager for Werder Bremen II.

== Club career ==
Schindler was born in Delmenhorst. While under contract with Bundesliga side Werder Bremen, he went on loan to Hansa Rostock, FC Augsburg and MSV Duisburg.

In July 2017, United Soccer League club FC Cincinnati signed Schindler. Following the end of the 2017 season, FC Cincinnati announced that Schindler's contract had expired and would not be renewed.

In 2020 he was player and assistant manager of Faroe Islands Premier League side Havnar Bóltfelag.
