= Kenney Walker =

American soccer player

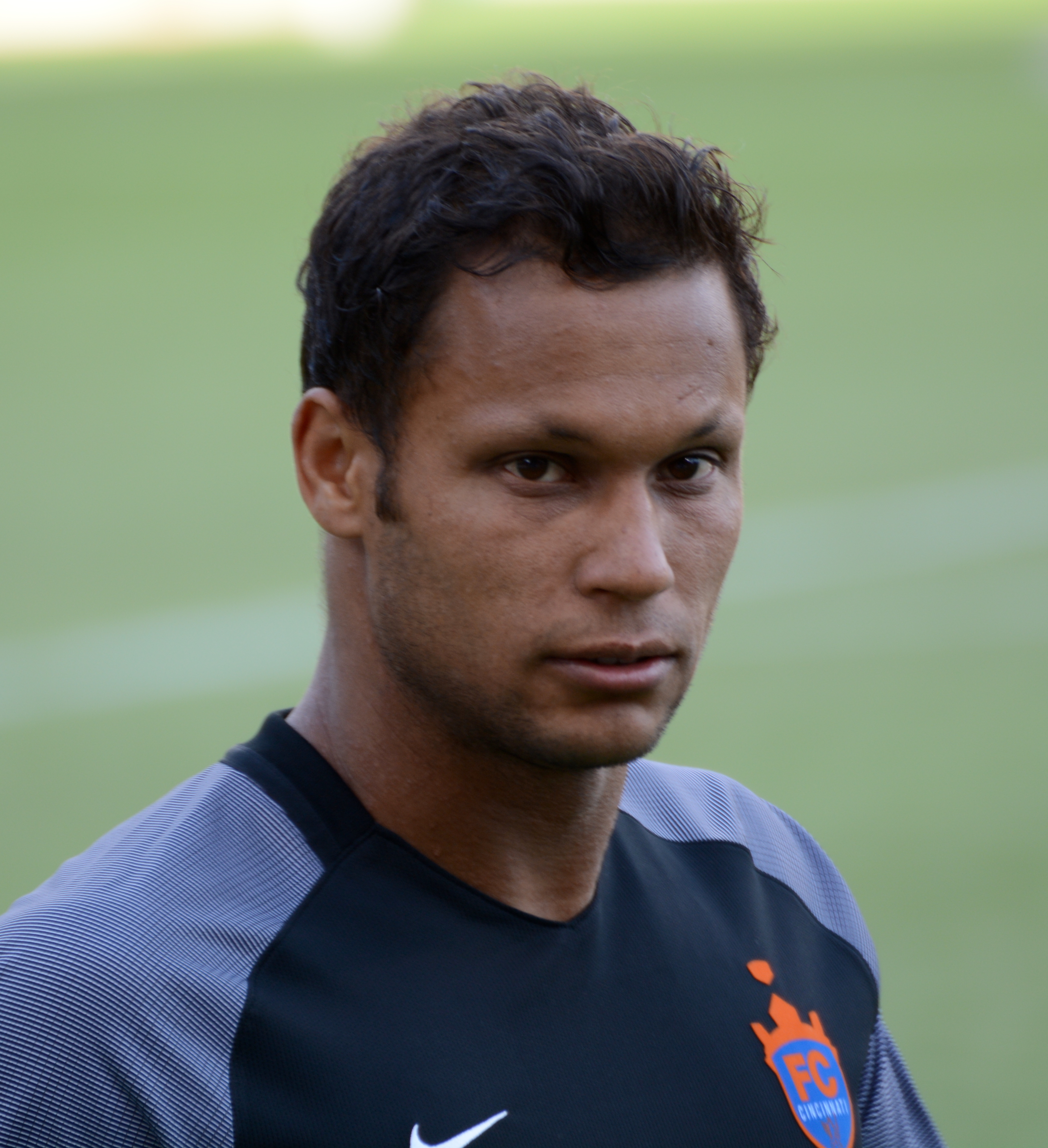
- Walker with FC Cincinnati in 2017

Personal information
- Full name: Kenneth Walker
- Date of birth: December 23, 1988 (age 37)
- Place of birth: Wickliffe, Ohio, United States
- Height: 5 ft 9 in (1.75 m)
- Position: Midfielder

College career
Years	Team	Apps	(Gls)
2007–2011	Louisville Cardinals	84	(9)

Senior career*
Years	Team	Apps	(Gls)
2010–2011	Chicago Fire Premier	15	(1)
2012–2015	LA Galaxy	17	(0)
2013	→ Fort Lauderdale Strikers (loan)	1	(0)
2013	→ Carolina RailHawks (loan)	11	(0)
2014	→ LA Galaxy II (loan)	7	(1)
2015	→ LA Galaxy II (loan)	5	(0)
2016–2018	FC Cincinnati	80	(6)
2019–2020	Indy Eleven	31	(1)
2020	→ Louisville City (loan)	1	(0)
2021	Kings Hammer	5	(0)
2022	Metro Louisville FC		
- * Club domestic league appearances and goals

Kenneth "Kenney" Walker (born December 23, 1988) is an American professional soccer player.

== Early life ==
Kenney Walker was born on December 23, 1988, in Wickliffe, Ohio to Mark Walker and Dawn Hoban. He attended Wickliffe High School, where he played soccer for his senior year. That season, he scored seven goals and helped Wickliffe HS to an 18–4–1 record, finishing as the 2006 OHSAA D3 State Runner-Up to Champion Worthington Christian HS. He was recognized locally as the boys soccer player of the year by both The News-Herald and The Cleveland Plain Dealer.

Walker matriculated to the University of Louisville in 2007. He played four seasons with the Cardinals men's soccer team from 2007 through 2011 (he redshirted the 2008 season due to an injury). In 2011, Walker was named to the All-Big East Conference Second Team. He graduated in 2011 with a degree in exercise science.

Walker also played for USL Premier Development League team Chicago Fire Premier between 2010 and 2011.

== Career ==
=== LA Galaxy and loans ===
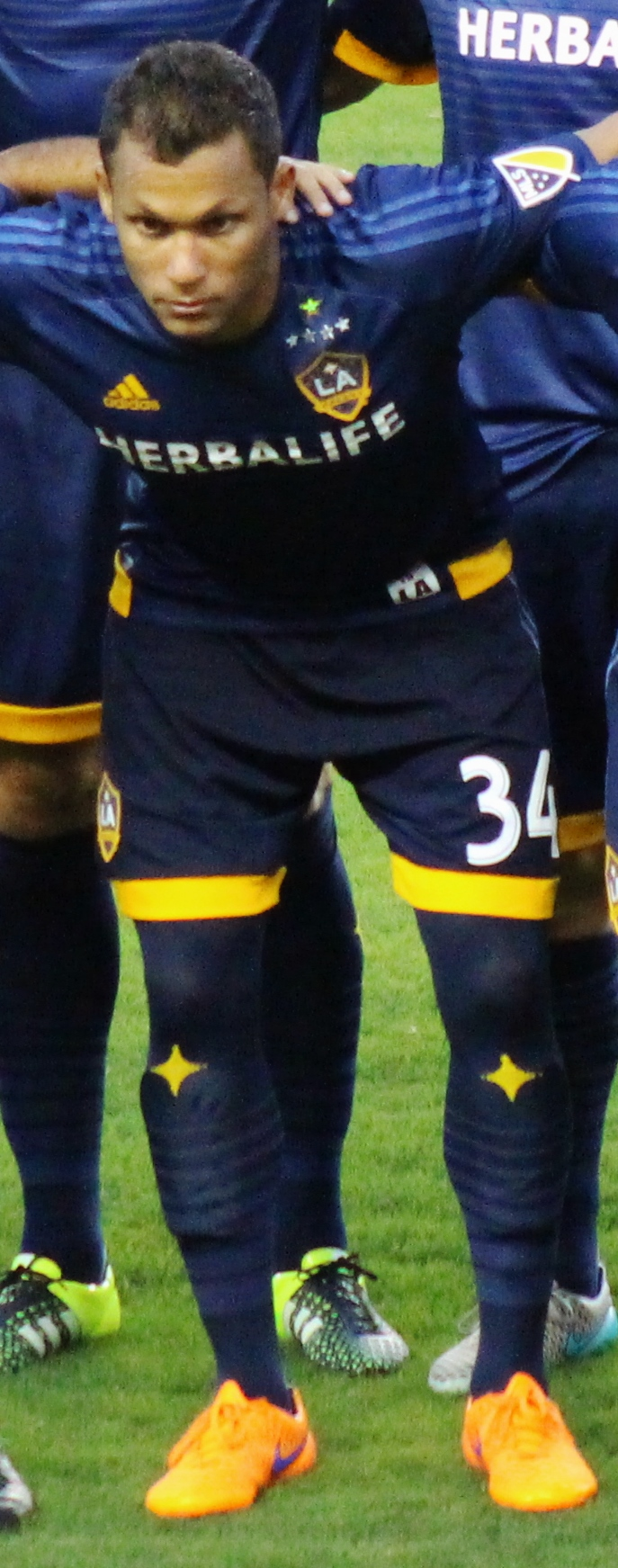
Walker with LA Galaxy in 2015

LA Galaxy selected Walker in the second round (No. 38 overall) of the 2012 MLS SuperDraft. Galaxy coach Bruce Arena spoke positively of Walker, telling reporters, "He is a defensive midfielder, a holding midfielder, an aggressive type of player and a good passer of the ball."

Walker made his debut for Galaxy on May 26, 2012, against Houston Dynamo. He only played one half, however, and did not have another appearance for the rest of the season. In 2013, Walker logged no minutes with the Galaxy, and spent the latter half of the season on loan in the North American Soccer League (the second-division U.S. league at the time). On July 26, Walker was loaned to Florida-based Fort Lauderdale Strikers. He only had one appearance for them though, as he was loaned to Carolina RailHawks just a month later on August 22. He spent the remainder of the season in North Carolina, where he made 11 appearances.

Walker began to see more action with Galaxy in 2014 and 2015, earning 7 starts and 16 appearances across the two years. He also spent significant time playing for LA Galaxy II, Galaxy's newly-formed reserve team in the United Soccer League. Walker debuted in Galaxy II's inaugural match against PDL side Fresno Fuego on February 13, 2014. Walker would go on to start in 14 of 16 appearances for Galaxy II over the following two years.

=== FC Cincinnati ===
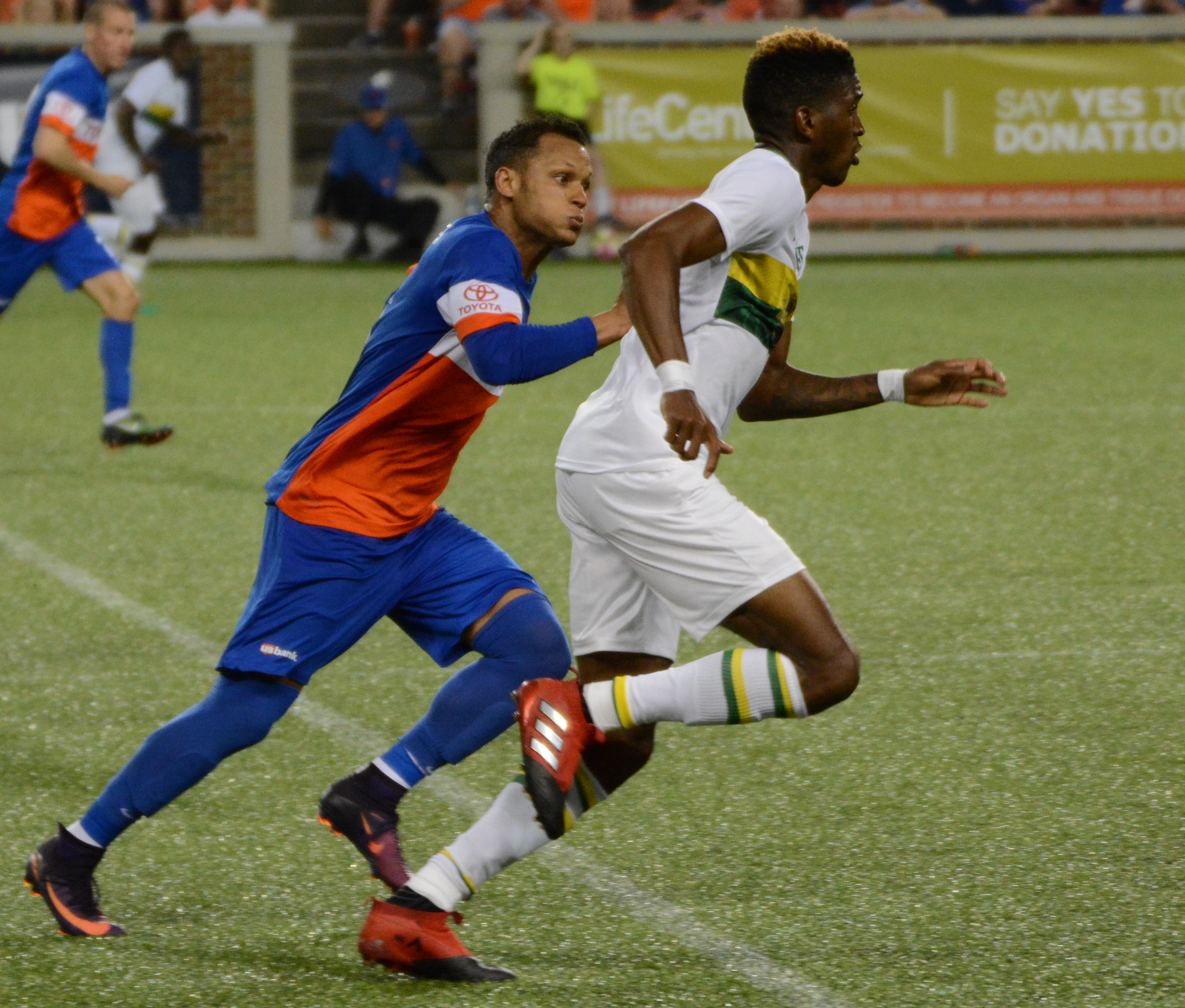
Walker in pursuit of Tampa Bay's Damion Lowe during a 2017 match in Cincinnati

On December 7, 2015, Walker was announced as one of the first eleven signings for United Soccer League side FC Cincinnati, who played their first season in 2016. Walker quickly became one of the team's primary midfielders, starting in 27 of his 28 appearances during the club's inaugural season. He remained a key player in 2017 under the new leadership of head coach Alan Koch, starting in 26 of 27 appearances and leading the team with seven assists. On September 17, 2017, Walker was named USL Player of the Week after he notched two assists and his first goal of the season in a 4–2 win against New York Red Bulls II. Following the end of the season, FC Cincinnati announced Walker as their Most Valuable Player of 2017.

Walker was one of just nine players who remained with FC Cincinnati into the 2018 season, as Koch spent the offseason significantly reworking the team roster. Walker started 2018 with a concussion injury, taking two weeks off after a heavy hit on March 31 from Indy Eleven's Jack McInerney (who was suspended for one game after a post-match review). On April 21, Walker made his return in a match against Pittsburgh Riverhounds as a 70th-minute substitute. He scored nine minutes after coming onto the pitch, earning a 2–2 draw for the club and a place on USL's Team of the Week for himself. The following week, Walker broke a 0–0 tie against Ottawa Fury with a goal shot from 50 yards out in the 68th minute (Cincinnati went on to win 0–3). The goal was featured as the #1 play in the SportsCenter Top 10 that night, and was later picked as the USL Fans' Choice Goal of the Month for April.

External videos
- Walker's goal on April 28, 2018 against Ottawa Fury was named USL Goal of the Month and featured as the #1 play in the SportsCenter Top 10 that night on ESPN.

=== Indy Eleven ===
In late November 2018, ahead of FC Cincinnati's move up to Major League Soccer, Walker announced that he would be leaving the club to play for USL Championship side Indy Eleven. According to Walker, FC Cincinnati had told him and other players that they may have the chance to be signed to the MLS side, but only if the club did not get better players for the same positions in the December expansion draft. Walker declined to wait in favor of a guaranteed signing with Indy Eleven, explaining, "I think for me it came down to deciding if I wanted to play or be a guy (in Cincinnati) that's mentally supporting the team and helping out at training, doing all that stuff and not being a contributing piece on weekends." On December 5, 2018, Indy Eleven officially announced their acquisition of Walker, along with his FC Cincinnati teammates Paddy Barrett and Tyler Gibson.

On September 21, 2020, Walker was loaned to USL Championship side Louisville City for the remainder of the season.

=== Kings Hammer FC ===
On April 12, 2021, Walker joined USL League Two side Kings Hammer FC ahead of the 2021 season.

== Honors ==
LA Galaxy

- MLS Cup: 2014

FC Cincinnati

- USL Regular Season Championship: (Note: Known since 2023 as the Players’ Shield) 2018
