= Garrett Halfhill =

American soccer player

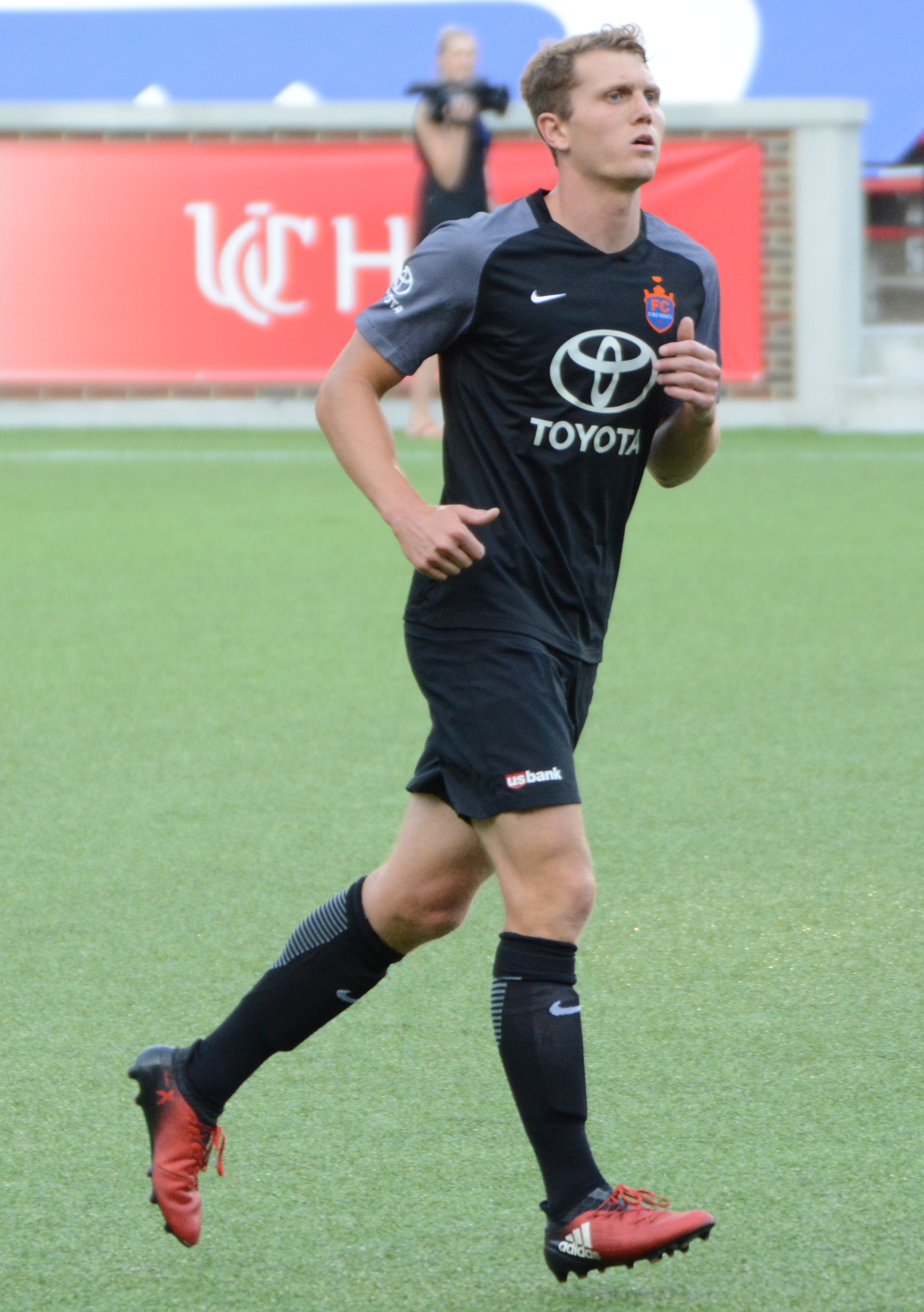
- Halfhill playing for FC Cincinnati in 2017

Personal information
- Date of birth: July 26, 1993 (age 33)
- Place of birth: San Diego, California, U.S.
- Height: 1.88 m (6 ft 2 in)
- Position: Defender

Team information
- Current team: New York Cosmos
- Number: 6

Youth career
- 2008–2011: Virginia Rush

College career
Years	Team	Apps	(Gls)
2011–2014	Xavier Musketeers	84	(6)

Senior career*
Years	Team	Apps	(Gls)
2013	Des Moines Menace	4	(0)
2014–2015	Cincinnati Dutch Lions	26	(1)
2017–2018	FC Cincinnati	2	(0)
2018–2019	New York Cosmos	35	(0)
- * Club domestic league appearances and goals as of October 19, 2019

Garrett Halfhill (born July 26, 1993) is an American former soccer player who last played for the New York Cosmos in the National Independent Soccer Association.

== Early life ==
Halfhill was born on July 26, 1993, in San Diego, California, to parents Robert and Cheryl Halfhill. He grew up in Virginia Beach, Virginia, where he attended Landstown High School from 2008 to 2011. He has two sisters, Janelle and Amber.

== Career ==
=== Youth ===
Halfhill played soccer for his high school team, the Landstown Eagles, for all four years of his attendance. In his freshman year, he participated in Landstown winning their first Beach District championship title. He received many accolades in high school, including being selected for the All-Virginia Beach Team three times. His senior year, he was named to the All-District and All-Region first teams, an honorable mention for the All-State team, and was named most outstanding male athlete by Landstown High School.

During high school, Halfhill also played for Virginia Rush Soccer Club, a developmental soccer club in Southeastern Virginia.

=== College and amateur ===
In 2011, Halfhill was admitted to Xavier University with a Dean's Award Scholarship to study marketing. He played on the university's men's soccer team and started his freshman year, in which he had five starts, twenty appearances, and one goal. From his sophomore year until his graduation, Halfhill appeared in every Xavier match and started in all but one of them. He was named to the Big East Conference all-academic team his junior and senior years. In his senior year, Halfhill was named team captain, and was second on the team in minutes played with 2,092 total minutes. On September 13, 2014, Halfhill scored a career-high four points in a 3–0 win against Cincinnati, leading him to be named to that week's Big East Weekly Honor Roll and College Soccer News National Team of the Week. He was also named to the Big East's All-Tournament Team. At the end of his Xavier career, Halfhill held the university record for most matches played with 84 total appearances.

Halfhill played in the Premier Development League (PDL) with the Des Moines Menace in 2013, and the Cincinnati Dutch Lions in 2014 and 2015.

=== Professional ===
In May 2017, Halfhill signed with United Soccer League club FC Cincinnati. He made his debut with FC Cincinnati in a U.S. Open Cup match against AFC Cleveland on May 17, 2017. He debuted in the USL on June 3, 2017, in a match against Rochester Rhinos. In October 2017, FC Cincinnati announced that Halfhill (along with eight other players) had been re-signed for the 2018 season. In 2018 FC Cincinnati released Halfhill and he landed with the New York Cosmos. He played two seasons (2018–2019) with the New York Cosmos and made 35 appearances for the club.

== Personal life ==
In addition to playing soccer, Halfhill has also worked as a sales representative at Paycor, a payroll and human resources company in Cincinnati, Ohio, and a business consultant at Dotloop.

== Career statistics ==
As of end of 2019 season

Appearances and goals by club, season and competition
Club	Season	League			National Cup		League Cup		Other		Total	
Club	Season	Division	Apps	Goals	Apps	Goals	Apps	Goals	Apps	Goals	Apps	Goals
Des Moines Menace	2013	Premier Development League	4	0	0	0	–		–		4	0
Cincinnati Dutch Lions	2014	Premier Development League	13	0	–		–		–		13	0
Cincinnati Dutch Lions	2015	Premier Development League	13	1	–		0	0	–		13	1
FC Cincinnati	2017	United Soccer League	2	0	1	0	0	0	1	0	4	0
New York Cosmos	2018	National Premier Soccer League	9	0	1	0	4	0	0	0	14	0
New York Cosmos	2019	National Premier Soccer League	9	0	0	0	3	0	1	0	13	0
New York Cosmos	2019	NPSL Members Cup	0	0	0	0	8	0	0	0	8	0
Career total			50	1	2	0	15	0	2	0	69	1
