= Evan Newton =

American soccer player

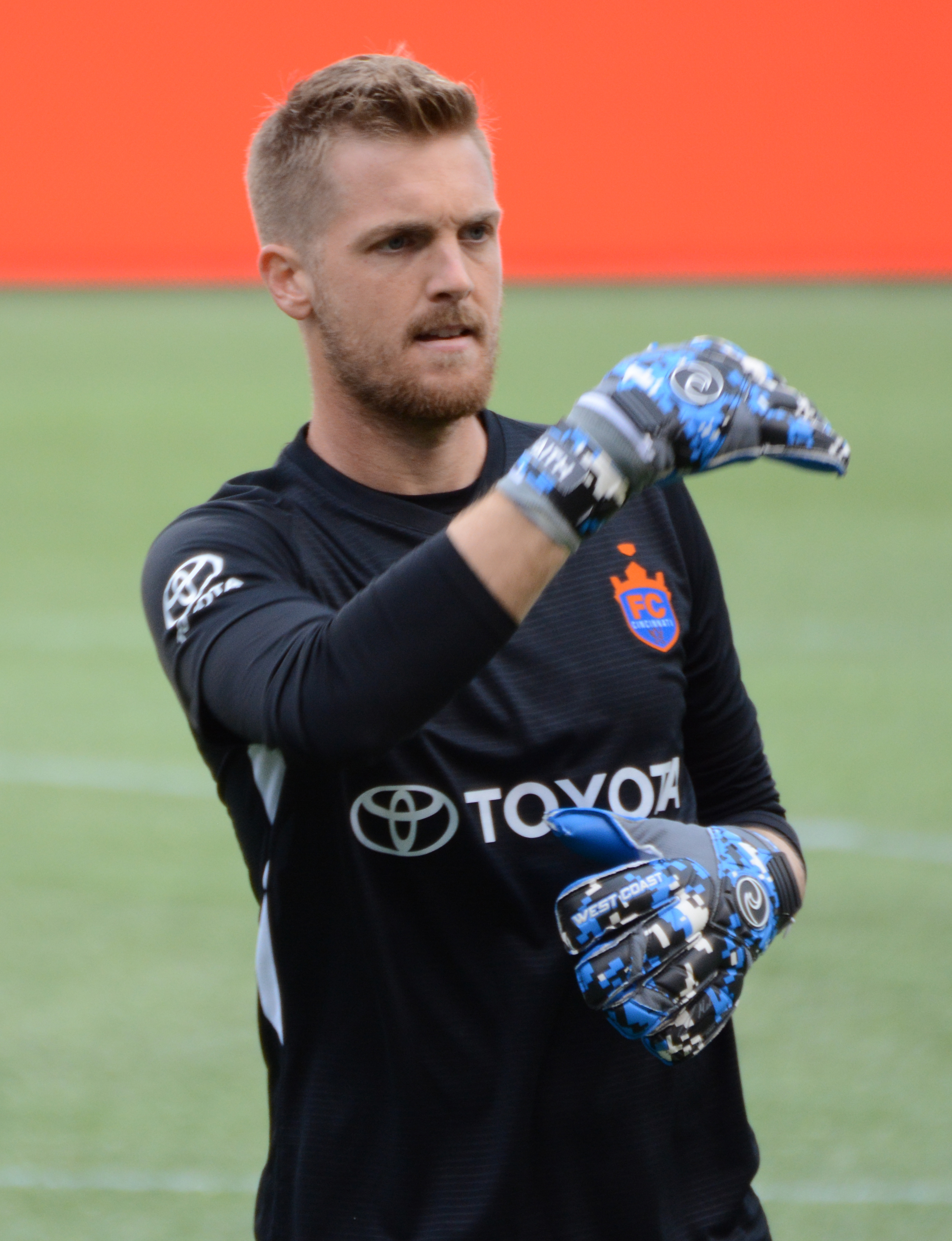
- Newton with FC Cincinnati in 2018

Personal information
- Full name: Evan Alexander Newton
- Date of birth: April 1, 1988 (age 38)
- Place of birth: Virginia Beach, Virginia, U.S.
- Height: 6 ft 2 in (1.88 m)
- Position: Goalkeeper

Youth career
- 2003–2005: IMG Soccer Academy

College career
Years	Team	Apps	(Gls)
2006–2010	Old Dominion Monarchs	77	(0)

Senior career*
Years	Team	Apps	(Gls)
2005	Bradenton Academics	3	(0)
2006–2009	Hampton Roads Piranhas	41	(0)
2011	Houston Dynamo	0	(0)
2011	→ FC Tampa Bay (loan)	2	(0)
2012–2013	San Jose Earthquakes	0	(0)
2014	Arizona United	28	(0)
2015	Oklahoma City Energy	27	(0)
2016–2017	Sacramento Republic	38	(0)
2018	FC Cincinnati	20	(0)
2019–2020	Indy Eleven	42	(0)
2020	→ New York City FC (loan)	0	(0)
2021–2022	Vancouver Whitecaps FC	0	(0)
2022	→ El Paso Locomotive (loan)	34	(0)

International career
2003–2005	United States U17	5	(0)
- * Club domestic league appearances and goals

Evan Alexander Newton (born April 1, 1988) is an American former professional footballer who played as a goalkeeper.

== Career ==
=== College and amateur ===
Newton played college soccer at Old Dominion University. He started all 17 games his freshman year and finished with a. 97 GAA, 52 saves, and 10 shutouts. In his sophomore year in 2007, he started every single game again and finished 2nd in CAA with a .67 GAA. In 2008, he was a preseason All-CAA selection, but due to an injury, he redshirted his junior year. In 2009, he led CAA with 9 shutouts and was fourth in save percentage. In his senior year, he set school records at Old Dominion in saves and shutouts with 254 saves and 36 shutouts.

During his college years, Newton also played for the Bradenton Academics and the Hampton Roads Piranhas in the USL Premier Development League.

=== Professional ===
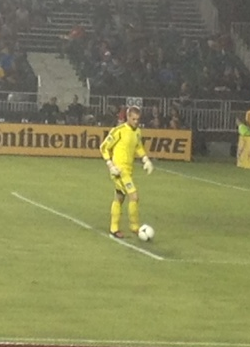
Evan Newton playing for the San Jose Earthquakes in a friendly against Swansea City in 2012

On January 18, 2011, Newton was selected in the first round (7th overall) of the 2011 MLS Supplemental Draft by the Houston Dynamo. He was signed to a contract a month later.

On May 5, Newton was loaned to FC Tampa Bay of the North American Soccer League, following a season-ending knee injury suffered by Tampa's first-choice goalkeeper Daryl Sattler. Newton returned to Houston at the end of the 2011 NASL season.

Newton was waived by Houston on November 23, 2011.

Newton signed with San Jose Earthquakes on March 9, 2012. On July 28 of that year he played 45 minutes in a friendly against Swansea City.

On April 9, 2014, Newton signed with USL Pro club Arizona United.

On March 4, 2015, Newton signed with Oklahoma City Energy FC.

After spending two seasons with Sacramento Republic FC, Newton signed with FC Cincinnati on January 5, 2018.

Newton joined USL side Indy Eleven on January 8, 2019. Shortly after signing a new contract with Indy Eleven, Newton moved on a short-term loan to MLS side New York City FC ahead of their CONCACAF Champions League fixtures.

On January 29, 2021, Newton transferred to the Vancouver Whitecaps FC. On January 25, 2022, Newton was loaned to USL Championship side El Paso Locomotive FC for the 2022 season. He played 34 matches and kept 8 clean sheets.

Newton retired from professional soccer after the 2022 season.
