= Corben Bone =

American soccer player

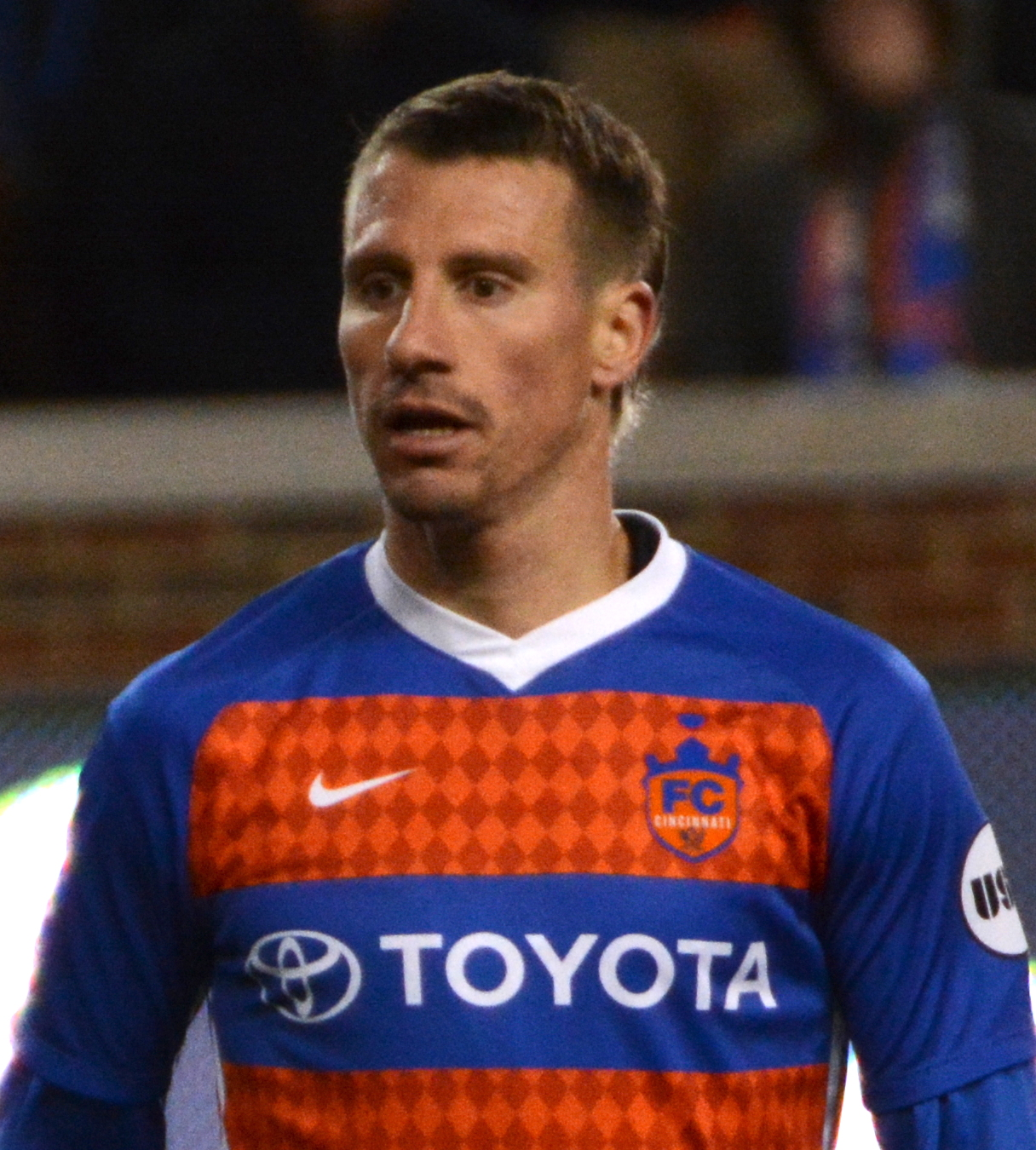
- Bone with FC Cincinnati in 2018

Personal information
- Full name: Corben Bone
- Date of birth: September 16, 1988 (age 38)
- Place of birth: Plano, Texas, U.S.
- Height: 5 ft 9 in (1.75 m)
- Position: Midfielder

Youth career
- 2005–2006: Solar SC
- 2007–2009: Wake Forest Demon Deacons

Senior career*
Years	Team	Apps	(Gls)
2008	Cary RailHawks U23s	5	(1)
2009	Carolina Dynamo	2	(0)
2010–2013	Chicago Fire	18	(0)
2014	Philadelphia Union	2	(0)
2014	→ Wilmington Hammerheads (loan)	9	(2)
2015	Wilmington Hammerheads	20	(0)
2016–2019	FC Cincinnati	96	(13)
2020–2022	Louisville City	65	(8)
Total		217	(24)

International career
2005	United States U17	1	(0)
2006	United States U18	2	(0)
2006	United States U20	7	(0)
- * Club domestic league appearances and goals

Corben Bone (born September 16, 1988) is an American former professional soccer player who played as a midfielder.

== Career ==
=== College and amateur ===
Bone played college soccer at Wake Forest University from 2007 to 2009 where he appeared in 68 games scoring 15 goals and adding 38 assists. He was a member of Wake Forest's 2007 NCAA College Cup Championship team. He was named ACC Offensive Player of the year in 2009.

During his college years Bone also played for both Cary RailHawks U23s and Carolina Dynamo in the USL Premier Development League.

=== Professional ===
Bone was drafted in the first round (13th overall) of the 2010 MLS SuperDraft by Chicago Fire. He made his professional debut on May 8, 2010, in a game against Toronto FC. In his four years at the club Bone only featured in 18 league matches. Bone moved to Philadelphia Union on December 12, 2013, when he was selected in stage one of the 2013 MLS Re-Entry Draft.

Bone was loaned to USL Pro club Wilmington Hammerheads on August 12, 2014. At the beginning of the following season, he made his move permanent.

After one year with Wilmington, Bone signed with FC Cincinnati ahead of their inaugural 2016 season. The club did not renew his contract in October 2019, and he was signed by Louisville City on November 26.

In November 2022, Louisville City FC announced that Bone had retired from his playing career to pursue other opportunities. As of December 2022, he was listed on the website of FC Cincinnati with the job title "Director of Soccer in the Community & Club Ambassador".

=== Post-professional ===
Bone played in the 2023 edition of The Soccer Tournament with Nati SC, a team composed of FC Cincinnati alumni.
